= 1950 Ball State Cardinals football team =

American college football season

1950 Ball State Cardinals football
- Conference: Independent
- Record: 2–4–1
- Head coach: John Magnabosco (15th season)
- Home stadium: Ball State Field

1950 Eastern college football independents records
	Conf.			Overall
Team	W	L	T	W		L		T
Franklin & Marshall		–		9	–	0	–	0
No. 6 Princeton		–		9	–	0	–	0
St. Lawrence		–		8	–	0	–	0
Thiel		–		7	–	0	–	0
No. 2 Army		–		8	–	1	–	0
Fordham		–		8	–	1	–	0
Carnegie Tech		–		7	–	1	–	0
Drexel		–		6	–	1	–	0
Cornell		–		7	–	2	–	0
Gannon		–		6	–	2	–	0
Bucknell		–		6	–	3	–	0
Penn		–		6	–	3	–	0
Yale		–		6	–	3	–	0
Buffalo		–		5	–	3	–	0
Colgate		–		5	–	3	–	0
Penn State		–		5	–	3	–	1
Syracuse		–		5	–	5	–	0
Temple		–		4	–	4	–	1
Tufts		–		4	–	4	–	1
Columbia		–		4	–	5	–	0
Villanova		–		4	–	5	–	0
Holy Cross		–		4	–	5	–	1
Dartmouth		–		3	–	5	–	1
Boston University		–		3	–	5	–	0
Duquesne		–		2	–	6	–	1
Hofstra		–		2	–	6	–	0
NYU		–		1	–	5	–	1
CCNY		–		1	–	7	–	0
Harvard		–		1	–	7	–	0
Brown		–		1	–	8	–	0
Pittsburgh		–		1	–	8	–	0
Boston College		–		0	–	9	–	1
Rankings from AP Poll

The 1950 Ball State Cardinals football team was an American football team that represented Ball State Teachers College (later renamed Ball State University) as an independent during the 1950 college football season. In its 15th season under head coach John Magnabosco, the team compiled a 2–4–1 record. The 1950 season followed a 1949 season in which the Cardinals had compiled a perfect 8–0 record.

Key players on the 1950 Ball State team included quarterback Bob Baker and halfbacks Don McAfee and Dick Isenberg.

During the 1950 season, Ball State began discussions that led to its joining the new Indiana Collegiate Conference for the 1951 season.

The team played its home games at Ball State Field in Muncie, Indiana.

== Schedule ==
Date	Time	Opponent	Site	Result	Attendance	Source
September 23		at Eastern Illinois	Lincoln Field; Charleston, IL	L 6–35		
October 7		DePauw	Ball State Field; Muncie, IN	W 27–13		
October 14	3:00 p.m.	Butler	Ball State Field; Muncie, IN	L 7–33	4,000	
October 21		Michigan State Normal^{†}	Ball State Field; Muncie, IN	L 0–13		
October 28		at Valparaiso	Valparaiso, IN	L 7–21		
November 4		at Saint Joseph's (IN)	Rensselaer, IN	T 7–7		
November 11		Indiana State	Ball State Field; Muncie, IN (Blue Key Victory Bell)	W 20–0		
^{†}Homecoming; All times are in Eastern time
