= 1950 Harvard Crimson football team =

American college football season

1950 Harvard Crimson football
- Conference: Independent
- Record: 1–7
- Head coach: Lloyd Jordan (1st season)
- Captain: Philip L. Isenberg
- Home stadium: Harvard Stadium

1950 Eastern college football independents records
	Conf.			Overall
Team	W	L	T	W		L		T
Franklin & Marshall		–		9	–	0	–	0
No. 6 Princeton		–		9	–	0	–	0
St. Lawrence		–		8	–	0	–	0
Thiel		–		7	–	0	–	0
No. 2 Army		–		8	–	1	–	0
Fordham		–		8	–	1	–	0
Carnegie Tech		–		7	–	1	–	0
Drexel		–		6	–	1	–	0
Cornell		–		7	–	2	–	0
Gannon		–		6	–	2	–	0
Bucknell		–		6	–	3	–	0
Penn		–		6	–	3	–	0
Yale		–		6	–	3	–	0
Buffalo		–		5	–	3	–	0
Colgate		–		5	–	3	–	0
Penn State		–		5	–	3	–	1
Syracuse		–		5	–	5	–	0
Temple		–		4	–	4	–	1
Tufts		–		4	–	4	–	1
Columbia		–		4	–	5	–	0
Villanova		–		4	–	5	–	0
Holy Cross		–		4	–	5	–	1
Dartmouth		–		3	–	5	–	1
Boston University		–		3	–	5	–	0
Duquesne		–		2	–	6	–	1
Hofstra		–		2	–	6	–	0
NYU		–		1	–	5	–	1
CCNY		–		1	–	7	–	0
Harvard		–		1	–	7	–	0
Brown		–		1	–	8	–	0
Pittsburgh		–		1	–	8	–	0
Boston College		–		0	–	9	–	1
Rankings from AP Poll

The 1950 Harvard Crimson football team was an American football team that represented Harvard University during the 1950 college football season. In their first year under head coach Lloyd Jordan, the Crimson compiled a 1–7 record and were outscored 248 to 74. Philip L. Isenberg was the team captain.

Harvard played its home games at Harvard Stadium in the Allston neighborhood of Boston, Massachusetts.

== Schedule ==
Date	Opponent	Site	Result	Attendance	Source
October 7	Columbia	Harvard Stadium; Boston, MA	L 7–28	15,000	
October 14	No. 17 Cornell	Harvard Stadium; Boston, MA	L 7–28	16,000	
October 21	No. 1 Army	Harvard Stadium; Boston, MA	L 0–49	26,000	
October 28	Dartmouth	Harvard Stadium; Boston, MA (rivalry)	L 7–27	28,000	
November 4	Holy Cross	Harvard Stadium; Boston, MA	L 7–26	11,000	
November 11	at Princeton	Palmer Stadium; Princeton, NJ	L 26–63	25,000	
November 18	Brown	Harvard Stadium; Boston, MA	W 14–13	11,000	
November 25	Yale	Harvard Stadium; Boston, MA (The Game)	L 6–14	40,000	
Rankings from AP Poll released prior to the game
