= 1950 Duquesne Dukes football team =

American college football season

1950 Duquesne Dukes football
- Conference: Independent
- Record: 2–6–1
- Head coach: Doc Skender (1st season)
- Home stadium: Forbes Field, Pitt Stadium

1950 Eastern college football independents records
	Conf.			Overall
Team	W	L	T	W		L		T
Franklin & Marshall		–		9	–	0	–	0
No. 6 Princeton		–		9	–	0	–	0
St. Lawrence		–		8	–	0	–	0
Thiel		–		7	–	0	–	0
No. 2 Army		–		8	–	1	–	0
Fordham		–		8	–	1	–	0
Carnegie Tech		–		7	–	1	–	0
Drexel		–		6	–	1	–	0
Cornell		–		7	–	2	–	0
Gannon		–		6	–	2	–	0
Bucknell		–		6	–	3	–	0
Penn		–		6	–	3	–	0
Yale		–		6	–	3	–	0
Buffalo		–		5	–	3	–	0
Colgate		–		5	–	3	–	0
Penn State		–		5	–	3	–	1
Syracuse		–		5	–	5	–	0
Temple		–		4	–	4	–	1
Tufts		–		4	–	4	–	1
Columbia		–		4	–	5	–	0
Villanova		–		4	–	5	–	0
Holy Cross		–		4	–	5	–	1
Dartmouth		–		3	–	5	–	1
Boston University		–		3	–	5	–	0
Duquesne		–		2	–	6	–	1
Hofstra		–		2	–	6	–	0
NYU		–		1	–	5	–	1
CCNY		–		1	–	7	–	0
Harvard		–		1	–	7	–	0
Brown		–		1	–	8	–	0
Pittsburgh		–		1	–	8	–	0
Boston College		–		0	–	9	–	1
Rankings from AP Poll

The 1950 Duquesne Dukes football team was an American football team that represented Duquesne University as an independent during the 1950 college football season. In its first and only season under acting head coach Doc Skender, Duquesne compiled a 2–6–1 record and was outscored by a total of 265 to 169.

In January 1951, Duquesne president, the Rev. Vernon F. Gallagher, announced that the school had decided to suspend its participation in intercollegiate football. As reasons for the suspension, the school cited the manpower shortage resulting from the Korean War and noted that the school had suffered "heavy financial losses" from football over the last four years. The school did not resume competition in the sport until 1969.

== Schedule ==
Date	Time	Opponent	Site	Result	Attendance	Source
September 17		at Saint Vincent	Latrobe, PA	T 14–14	9,800	
September 23		at Villanova	Villanova Stadium; Villanova, PA	L 28–39		
September 30		at Florida	Florida Field; Gainesville, FL	L 14–28	18,500	
October 7		Boston University^{†}	Pitt Stadium; Pittsburgh, PA	L 7–21	10,000	
October 21		St. Bonaventure	Forbes Field; Pittsburgh, PA	W 25–12		
October 28	9:00 p.m.	at Louisville	duPont Manual Stadium; Louisville, KY	W 27–20	12,000	
November 4		at No. 14 Clemson	Memorial Stadium; Clemson, SC	L 20–53	17,000	
November 12		at Detroit	University of Detroit Stadium; Detroit, MI	L 14–47	7,129	
November 17		at Chattanooga	Chamberlain Field; Chattanooga, TN	L 20–32	8,500	
^{†}Homecoming; Rankings from AP Poll released prior to the game; All times are in Eastern time
