= Doc Skender =

Biographical details
- Born: October 26, 1906; Cherry Valley, Pennsylvania, U.S.
- Died: August 17, 1969 (aged 62); Pittsburgh, Pennsylvania, U.S.

Playing career

Football
- c. 1930: Duquesne
- Position: Tackle

Coaching career (HC unless noted)

Football
- 1936–1943: Duquesne (freshmen)
- 1944–1949: Duquesne (assistant)
- 1950: Duquesne (acting HC)

Baseball
- 1951–1969: Duquesne

Administrative career (AD unless noted)
- 1953–1969: Duquesne

Head coaching record
- Overall: 2–6–1 (football); 227–96 (baseball)

Louis E. "Doc" Skender (October 26, 1906 – August 17, 1969) was an American football and baseball coach and college athletics administrator. He served as the head baseball coach at Duquesne University from 1951 to 1969, compiling a record of 227–96. Skender was also the athletic director at Duquesne from 1951 to 1969 and served one season, in 1950, as acting head football coach, tallying a mark of 2–6–1. A native of Cherryville, Pennsylvania, Skender played college football at Duquesne as a tackle. He died at the age of 63, on August 17, 1969, at St. Clair Memorial Hospital in Pittsburgh, Pennsylvania.

== Head coaching record ==
Year	Team	Overall	Conference	Standing	Bowl/playoffs
Duquesne Dukes (Independent) (1950)
1950	Duquesne	2–6–1			
Duquesne:		2–6–1			
Total:		2–6–1			
