= 1950 Buffalo Bulls football team =

American college football season

1950 Buffalo Bulls football
- Conference: Independent
- Record: 5–3
- Head coach: James B. Wilson (3rd season)
- Captains: Matt Ferrentino; Ed Gicewicz
- Home stadium: Civic Stadium

1950 Eastern college football independents records
	Conf.			Overall
Team	W	L	T	W		L		T
Franklin & Marshall		–		9	–	0	–	0
No. 6 Princeton		–		9	–	0	–	0
St. Lawrence		–		8	–	0	–	0
Thiel		–		7	–	0	–	0
No. 2 Army		–		8	–	1	–	0
Fordham		–		8	–	1	–	0
Carnegie Tech		–		7	–	1	–	0
Drexel		–		6	–	1	–	0
Cornell		–		7	–	2	–	0
Gannon		–		6	–	2	–	0
Bucknell		–		6	–	3	–	0
Penn		–		6	–	3	–	0
Yale		–		6	–	3	–	0
Buffalo		–		5	–	3	–	0
Colgate		–		5	–	3	–	0
Penn State		–		5	–	3	–	1
Syracuse		–		5	–	5	–	0
Temple		–		4	–	4	–	1
Tufts		–		4	–	4	–	1
Columbia		–		4	–	5	–	0
Villanova		–		4	–	5	–	0
Holy Cross		–		4	–	5	–	1
Dartmouth		–		3	–	5	–	1
Boston University		–		3	–	5	–	0
Duquesne		–		2	–	6	–	1
Hofstra		–		2	–	6	–	0
NYU		–		1	–	5	–	1
CCNY		–		1	–	7	–	0
Harvard		–		1	–	7	–	0
Brown		–		1	–	8	–	0
Pittsburgh		–		1	–	8	–	0
Boston College		–		0	–	9	–	1
Rankings from AP Poll

The 1950 Buffalo Bulls football team was an American football team that represented the University of Buffalo as an independent during the 1950 college football season. In their third season under head coach James B. Wilson, the Bulls compiled a 5–3 record and outscored opponents by a total of 191 to 129. The team played its home games at Civic Stadium in Buffalo, New York.

== Schedule ==
Date	Opponent	Site	Result	Attendance	Source
September 23	at Cortland	Cortland, NY	W 13–0		
September 30	at Louisville	duPont Manual Stadium; Louisville, KY	L 19–48		
October 7	Niagara	Civic Stadium; Buffalo, NY	L 13–27		
October 14	Alfred	Civic Stadium; Buffalo, NY	W 13–0		
October 21	Brooklyn	Civic Stadium; Buffalo, NY	W 52–6		
October 28	Rhode Island State	Civic Stadium; Buffalo, NY	W 33–12	< 2,000	
November 11	Ohio	Civic Stadium; Buffalo, NY	L 14–22	1,500	
November 18	at RPI	Troy, NY	W 34–14		
