= 1950 Franklin & Marshall Diplomats football team =

American college football season

1950 Franklin & Marshall Diplomats football
- Conference: Independent
- Record: 9–0
- Head coach: S. Woodrow Sponaugle (3rd season)
- Captains: Robert King; Jack Lowder
- Home stadium: Williamson Field

1950 Eastern college football independents records
| | Conf. | | | Overall |
| Team | W | L | T | W | | L | | T |
|---|---|---|---|---|---|---|---|---|
| Franklin & Marshall | | – | | 9 | – | 0 | – | 0 |
| No. 6 Princeton | | – | | 9 | – | 0 | – | 0 |
| St. Lawrence | | – | | 8 | – | 0 | – | 0 |
| Thiel | | – | | 7 | – | 0 | – | 0 |
| No. 2 Army | | – | | 8 | – | 1 | – | 0 |
| Fordham | | – | | 8 | – | 1 | – | 0 |
| Carnegie Tech | | – | | 7 | – | 1 | – | 0 |
| Drexel | | – | | 6 | – | 1 | – | 0 |
| Cornell | | – | | 7 | – | 2 | – | 0 |
| Gannon | | – | | 6 | – | 2 | – | 0 |
| Bucknell | | – | | 6 | – | 3 | – | 0 |
| Penn | | – | | 6 | – | 3 | – | 0 |
| Yale | | – | | 6 | – | 3 | – | 0 |
| Buffalo | | – | | 5 | – | 3 | – | 0 |
| Colgate | | – | | 5 | – | 3 | – | 0 |
| Penn State | | – | | 5 | – | 3 | – | 1 |
| Syracuse | | – | | 5 | – | 5 | – | 0 |
| Temple | | – | | 4 | – | 4 | – | 1 |
| Tufts | | – | | 4 | – | 4 | – | 1 |
| Columbia | | – | | 4 | – | 5 | – | 0 |
| Villanova | | – | | 4 | – | 5 | – | 0 |
| Holy Cross | | – | | 4 | – | 5 | – | 1 |
| Dartmouth | | – | | 3 | – | 5 | – | 1 |
| Boston University | | – | | 3 | – | 5 | – | 0 |
| Duquesne | | – | | 2 | – | 6 | – | 1 |
| Hofstra | | – | | 2 | – | 6 | – | 0 |
| NYU | | – | | 1 | – | 5 | – | 1 |
| CCNY | | – | | 1 | – | 7 | – | 0 |
| Harvard | | – | | 1 | – | 7 | – | 0 |
| Brown | | – | | 1 | – | 8 | – | 0 |
| Pittsburgh | | – | | 1 | – | 8 | – | 0 |
| Boston College | | – | | 0 | – | 9 | – | 1 |
Rankings from AP Poll

The 1950 Franklin & Marshall Diplomats football team was an American football team that represented Franklin & Marshall College as an independent during the 1950 college football season. It played its home games at Williamson Field in Lancaster, Pennsylvania.

During the team's third season under head coach S. Woodrow Sponaugle, the Diplomats compiled a 9–0 record. It was the first perfect season in the school's history. Additional perfect seasons followed in 1964, 1972, and 1974.

Franklin & Marshall's Charles Cope was selected as the center on the 1950 Little All-America college football team.

== Schedule ==
| Date | Opponent | Site | Result | Attendance | Source |
|---|---|---|---|---|---|
| September 23 | vs. Lebanon Valley | Hershey Stadium; Hershey, PA (Hershey Chocolate Bowl) | W 13–7 | 9,000 | |
| September 30 | at Johns Hopkins | Homewood Field; Baltimore, MD | W 20–14 | | |
| October 7 | at Dickinson | Biddle Field; Carlisle, PA | W 7–0 | 5,000 | |
| October 14 | Western Maryland | Williamson Field; Lancaster, PA | W 25–0 | 6,000 | |
| October 21 | Albright^{†} | Williamson Field; Lancaster, PA | W 14–0 | 7,000 | |
| October 28 | at Swarthmore | Swarthmore, PA | W 41–0 | | |
| November 4 | Ursinus | Williamson Field; Lancaster, PA | W 39–0 | 4,000 | |
| November 11 | at Washington & Jefferson | Washington, PA | W 34–0 | 3,000 | |
| November 23 | Gettysburg | Williamson Field; Lancaster, PA | W 59–20 | 13,000 | |
^{†}Homecoming
