= 1950 Thiel Tomcats football team =

American college football season

1950 Thiel Tomcats football
- Conference: Independent
- Record: 7–0
- Head coach: Jack Stoeber (15th season)
- Home stadium: Packard Field

1950 Eastern college football independents records
	Conf.			Overall
Team	W	L	T	W		L		T
Franklin & Marshall		–		9	–	0	–	0
No. 6 Princeton		–		9	–	0	–	0
St. Lawrence		–		8	–	0	–	0
Thiel		–		7	–	0	–	0
No. 2 Army		–		8	–	1	–	0
Fordham		–		8	–	1	–	0
Carnegie Tech		–		7	–	1	–	0
Drexel		–		6	–	1	–	0
Cornell		–		7	–	2	–	0
Gannon		–		6	–	2	–	0
Bucknell		–		6	–	3	–	0
Penn		–		6	–	3	–	0
Yale		–		6	–	3	–	0
Buffalo		–		5	–	3	–	0
Colgate		–		5	–	3	–	0
Penn State		–		5	–	3	–	1
Syracuse		–		5	–	5	–	0
Temple		–		4	–	4	–	1
Tufts		–		4	–	4	–	1
Columbia		–		4	–	5	–	0
Villanova		–		4	–	5	–	0
Holy Cross		–		4	–	5	–	1
Dartmouth		–		3	–	5	–	1
Boston University		–		3	–	5	–	0
Duquesne		–		2	–	6	–	1
Hofstra		–		2	–	6	–	0
NYU		–		1	–	5	–	1
CCNY		–		1	–	7	–	0
Harvard		–		1	–	7	–	0
Brown		–		1	–	8	–	0
Pittsburgh		–		1	–	8	–	0
Boston College		–		0	–	9	–	1
Rankings from AP Poll

The 1950 Thiel Tomcats football team was an American football team that represented Thiel College as an independent during the 1950 college football season. In their 15th year under head coach Jack Stoeber, the Tomcats compiled a perfect 7–0 record, shut out their final five opponents, and outscored all opponents by a total of 204 to 13.

The team played its home game at Packard Field in Greenville, Pennsylvania.

== Schedule ==
Date	Opponent	Site	Result	Attendance	Source
September 30	at Hiram	Hiram, OH	W 11–6		
October 7	at Westminster (PA)^{†}	Stewart Field; Greenville, PA	W 20–7	3,000	
October 14	at Clarion	Clarion, PA	W 12–0	2,000	
October 21	at Edinboro	Edinboro, PA	W 21–0		
October 28	Washington & Jefferson	Stewart Field; Greenville, PA	W 21–0	3,000	
November 4	Grove City	Stewart Field; Greenville, PA	W 58–0	800	
November 11	at Lycoming	Williamsport, PA	W 61–0		
^{†}Homecoming
