= 1950 NYU Violets football team =

American college football season

1950 NYU Violets football
- Conference: Independent
- Record: 1–5–1
- Head coach: Hugh Devore (1st season)
- Home stadium: None

1950 Eastern college football independents records
	Conf.			Overall
Team	W	L	T	W		L		T
Franklin & Marshall		–		9	–	0	–	0
No. 6 Princeton		–		9	–	0	–	0
St. Lawrence		–		8	–	0	–	0
Thiel		–		7	–	0	–	0
No. 2 Army		–		8	–	1	–	0
Fordham		–		8	–	1	–	0
Carnegie Tech		–		7	–	1	–	0
Drexel		–		6	–	1	–	0
Cornell		–		7	–	2	–	0
Gannon		–		6	–	2	–	0
Bucknell		–		6	–	3	–	0
Penn		–		6	–	3	–	0
Yale		–		6	–	3	–	0
Buffalo		–		5	–	3	–	0
Colgate		–		5	–	3	–	0
Penn State		–		5	–	3	–	1
Syracuse		–		5	–	5	–	0
Temple		–		4	–	4	–	1
Tufts		–		4	–	4	–	1
Columbia		–		4	–	5	–	0
Villanova		–		4	–	5	–	0
Holy Cross		–		4	–	5	–	1
Dartmouth		–		3	–	5	–	1
Boston University		–		3	–	5	–	0
Duquesne		–		2	–	6	–	1
Hofstra		–		2	–	6	–	0
NYU		–		1	–	5	–	1
CCNY		–		1	–	7	–	0
Harvard		–		1	–	7	–	0
Brown		–		1	–	8	–	0
Pittsburgh		–		1	–	8	–	0
Boston College		–		0	–	9	–	1
Rankings from AP Poll

The 1950 NYU Violets football team was an American football team that represented New York University as an independent during the 1950 college football season.

In their first season under head coach Hugh Devore, the Violets compiled a 1–5–1 record, and were outscored 157–88.

The team played one game in Manhattan, against crosstown rival Fordham at the Polo Grounds. The rest of its schedule was on the road. NYU played no games at its on-campus home field, Ohio Field in University Heights, Bronx.

== Schedule ==
Date	Opponent	Site	Result	Attendance	Source
October 7	at Merchant Marine	Tomb Field; Kings Point, NY	T 6–6	4,500	
October 14	at Brooklyn	Ebbets Field; Brooklyn, NY	W 55–0	13,000	
October 21	at Rutgers	Rutgers Stadium; Piscataway, NJ	L 0–42	10,000	
October 28	at Connecticut	Gardner Dow Athletic Fields; Storrs, CT	L 7–14	8,000	
November 4	at Bucknell	Memorial Stadium; Lewisburg, PA	L 7–41	3,000	
November 11	at Boston University	Fenway Park; Boston, MA	L 13–41	3,724	
November 25	vs. Fordham	Polo Grounds; New York, NY	L 0–13	1,500	
