= 1950 Boston College Eagles football team =

American college football season

1950 Boston College Eagles football
- Conference: Independent
- Record: 0–9–1
- Head coach: Denny Myers (7th season)
- Captain: Phil Cohen
- Home stadium: Braves Field

1950 Eastern college football independents records
	Conf.			Overall
Team	W	L	T	W		L		T
Franklin & Marshall		–		9	–	0	–	0
No. 6 Princeton		–		9	–	0	–	0
St. Lawrence		–		8	–	0	–	0
Thiel		–		7	–	0	–	0
No. 2 Army		–		8	–	1	–	0
Fordham		–		8	–	1	–	0
Carnegie Tech		–		7	–	1	–	0
Drexel		–		6	–	1	–	0
Cornell		–		7	–	2	–	0
Gannon		–		6	–	2	–	0
Bucknell		–		6	–	3	–	0
Penn		–		6	–	3	–	0
Yale		–		6	–	3	–	0
Buffalo		–		5	–	3	–	0
Colgate		–		5	–	3	–	0
Penn State		–		5	–	3	–	1
Syracuse		–		5	–	5	–	0
Temple		–		4	–	4	–	1
Tufts		–		4	–	4	–	1
Columbia		–		4	–	5	–	0
Villanova		–		4	–	5	–	0
Holy Cross		–		4	–	5	–	1
Dartmouth		–		3	–	5	–	1
Boston University		–		3	–	5	–	0
Duquesne		–		2	–	6	–	1
Hofstra		–		2	–	6	–	0
NYU		–		1	–	5	–	1
CCNY		–		1	–	7	–	0
Harvard		–		1	–	7	–	0
Brown		–		1	–	8	–	0
Pittsburgh		–		1	–	8	–	0
Boston College		–		0	–	9	–	1
Rankings from AP Poll

The 1950 Boston College Eagles football team represented Boston College as an independent during the 1950 college football season. The Eagles were led by seventh-year head coach Denny Myers and played their home games at Braves Field in Boston, Massachusetts. Boston College finished winless for the first time since 1902 with a record of 0–9–1. The tie came against Wake Forest. Myers announced his resignation as head coach prior to the season finale against rival Holy Cross. He compiled a record of 35–27–4 while at Boston College.

== Schedule ==
Date	Opponent	Site	Result	Attendance	Source
September 22	Wake Forest	Braves Field; Boston, MA	T 7–7	12,324	
September 30	at No. 6 Oklahoma	Oklahoma Memorial Stadium; Norman, OK	L 0–28	33,000	
October 7	at Ole Miss	Hemingway Stadium; Oxford, MS	L 0–54	15,000	
October 13	Fordham	Braves Field; Boston, MA	L 6–26	10,884	
October 20	Georgetown	Braves Field; Boston, MA	L 10–20	14,538	
October 27	Georgia	Braves Field; Boston, MA	L 7–19	9,243	
November 4	Penn State	Braves Field; Boston, MA	L 13–20	8,503	
November 11	No. 13 Clemson	Braves Field; Boston, MA (rivalry)	L 14–35	9,606	
November 18	Villanova	Braves Field; Boston, MA	L 7–29	6,281	
December 2	Holy Cross	Braves Field; Boston, MA (rivalry)	L 14–32	25,035	
Rankings from AP Poll released prior to the game
