= 1950 Boston University Terriers football team =

American college football season

1950 Boston University Terriers football
- Conference: Independent
- Record: 3–5
- Head coach: Aldo Donelli (4th season)
- Home stadium: Fenway Park

1950 Eastern college football independents records
	Conf.			Overall
Team	W	L	T	W		L		T
Franklin & Marshall		–		9	–	0	–	0
No. 6 Princeton		–		9	–	0	–	0
St. Lawrence		–		8	–	0	–	0
Thiel		–		7	–	0	–	0
No. 2 Army		–		8	–	1	–	0
Fordham		–		8	–	1	–	0
Carnegie Tech		–		7	–	1	–	0
Drexel		–		6	–	1	–	0
Cornell		–		7	–	2	–	0
Gannon		–		6	–	2	–	0
Bucknell		–		6	–	3	–	0
Penn		–		6	–	3	–	0
Yale		–		6	–	3	–	0
Buffalo		–		5	–	3	–	0
Colgate		–		5	–	3	–	0
Penn State		–		5	–	3	–	1
Syracuse		–		5	–	5	–	0
Temple		–		4	–	4	–	1
Tufts		–		4	–	4	–	1
Columbia		–		4	–	5	–	0
Villanova		–		4	–	5	–	0
Holy Cross		–		4	–	5	–	1
Dartmouth		–		3	–	5	–	1
Boston University		–		3	–	5	–	0
Duquesne		–		2	–	6	–	1
Hofstra		–		2	–	6	–	0
NYU		–		1	–	5	–	1
CCNY		–		1	–	7	–	0
Harvard		–		1	–	7	–	0
Brown		–		1	–	8	–	0
Pittsburgh		–		1	–	8	–	0
Boston College		–		0	–	9	–	1
Rankings from AP Poll

The 1950 Boston University Terriers football team was an American football team that represented Boston University as an independent during the 1950 college football season. In its fourth season under head coach Aldo Donelli, the team compiled a 3–5 record and was outscored by their opponents by a total of 187 to 139.

== Schedule ==
Date	Time	Opponent	Site	Result	Attendance	Source
October 7		at Duquesne	Pitt Stadium; Pittsburgh, PA	W 21–7	10,000	
October 13		St. Bonaventure	Fenway Park; Boston, MA	L 21–25	12,135	
October 20		No. 14 Miami (FL)	Burdine Stadium; Miami, FL	L 7–34	40,119	
October 28	1:30 p.m.	Syracuse^{†}	Fenway Park; Boston, MA	L 7–13	8,591	
November 4	1:30 p.m.	William & Mary	Fenway Park; Boston, MA	W 16–14	3,606	
November 11		NYU	Fenway Park; Boston, MA	W 31–13	3,724	
November 18	1:30 p.m.	Idaho	Fenway Park; Boston, MA	L 19–26	8,298	
November 24		Pacific (CA)	Pacific Memorial Stadium; Stockton, CA	L 7–55	11,000	
^{†}Homecoming; Rankings from AP Poll released prior to the game; All times are in Eastern time
