= 1950 St. Lawrence Larries football team =

American college football season

1950 St. Lawrence Larries football
- Conference: Independent
- Record: 8–0
- Head coach: Paul Patten (3rd season)

1950 Eastern college football independents records
	Conf.			Overall
Team	W	L	T	W		L		T
Franklin & Marshall		–		9	–	0	–	0
No. 6 Princeton		–		9	–	0	–	0
St. Lawrence		–		8	–	0	–	0
Thiel		–		7	–	0	–	0
No. 2 Army		–		8	–	1	–	0
Fordham		–		8	–	1	–	0
Carnegie Tech		–		7	–	1	–	0
Drexel		–		6	–	1	–	0
Cornell		–		7	–	2	–	0
Gannon		–		6	–	2	–	0
Bucknell		–		6	–	3	–	0
Penn		–		6	–	3	–	0
Yale		–		6	–	3	–	0
Buffalo		–		5	–	3	–	0
Colgate		–		5	–	3	–	0
Penn State		–		5	–	3	–	1
Syracuse		–		5	–	5	–	0
Temple		–		4	–	4	–	1
Tufts		–		4	–	4	–	1
Columbia		–		4	–	5	–	0
Villanova		–		4	–	5	–	0
Holy Cross		–		4	–	5	–	1
Dartmouth		–		3	–	5	–	1
Boston University		–		3	–	5	–	0
Duquesne		–		2	–	6	–	1
Hofstra		–		2	–	6	–	0
NYU		–		1	–	5	–	1
CCNY		–		1	–	7	–	0
Harvard		–		1	–	7	–	0
Brown		–		1	–	8	–	0
Pittsburgh		–		1	–	8	–	0
Boston College		–		0	–	9	–	1
Rankings from AP Poll

The 1950 St. Lawrence Larries football team was an American football team that represented St. Lawrence University of Canton, New York, as an independent during the 1950 college football season. In their third year under head coach Paul Patten, the Larries compiled a perfect 8–0 record and outscored opponents by a total of 223 to 71. The team was the first in St. Lawrence football history to finish with a perfect season. It was inducted into the St. Lawrence Hall of Fame in 1990.

Three St. Lawrence players received honorable mention on the 1950 Little All-America college football team: halfback John Yannes (over 1,000 rushing yards); end Robert Kately; and tackle Bob Walin.

== Schedule ==
Date	Opponent	Site	Result	Attendance	Source
September 23	Champlain	Canton, NY	W 39–0		
September 30	at Union (NY)	Schenectady, NY	W 14–7		
October 7	at Hobart	Boswell Field; Geneva, NY	W 20–13	2,500	
October 14	Middlebury^{†}	Canton, NY	W 39–0	4,000	
October 21	at Hofstra	Hofstra Field; Hempstead, NY	W 39–26	3,000	
October 28	Clarkson	Canton, NY	W 33–0		
November 4	Alfred	Canton, NY	W 18–6		
November 11	at Rochester	River Campus Stadium; Rochester, NY	W 21–19	6,000	
^{†}Homecoming
