= 1950 Drexel Dragons football team =

American college football season

1950 Drexel Dragons football
- Conference: Independent
- Record: 6–1
- Head coach: Eddie Allen (1st season)
- Captains: Tommy Price; Lew Gerlach
- Home stadium: Drexel Field

1950 Eastern college football independents records
	Conf.			Overall
Team	W	L	T	W		L		T
Franklin & Marshall		–		9	–	0	–	0
No. 6 Princeton		–		9	–	0	–	0
St. Lawrence		–		8	–	0	–	0
Thiel		–		7	–	0	–	0
No. 2 Army		–		8	–	1	–	0
Fordham		–		8	–	1	–	0
Carnegie Tech		–		7	–	1	–	0
Drexel		–		6	–	1	–	0
Cornell		–		7	–	2	–	0
Gannon		–		6	–	2	–	0
Bucknell		–		6	–	3	–	0
Penn		–		6	–	3	–	0
Yale		–		6	–	3	–	0
Buffalo		–		5	–	3	–	0
Colgate		–		5	–	3	–	0
Penn State		–		5	–	3	–	1
Syracuse		–		5	–	5	–	0
Temple		–		4	–	4	–	1
Tufts		–		4	–	4	–	1
Columbia		–		4	–	5	–	0
Villanova		–		4	–	5	–	0
Holy Cross		–		4	–	5	–	1
Dartmouth		–		3	–	5	–	1
Boston University		–		3	–	5	–	0
Duquesne		–		2	–	6	–	1
Hofstra		–		2	–	6	–	0
NYU		–		1	–	5	–	1
CCNY		–		1	–	7	–	0
Harvard		–		1	–	7	–	0
Brown		–		1	–	8	–	0
Pittsburgh		–		1	–	8	–	0
Boston College		–		0	–	9	–	1
Rankings from AP Poll

The 1950 Drexel Dragons football team represented the Drexel Institute of Technology (renamed Drexel University in 1970) as an independent during the 1950 college football season. Eddie Allen was the team's head coach.

Tackle Tom Staszak was awarded second team on the 1950 Little All-America college football team.

== Schedule ==
Date	Opponent	Site	Result	Attendance	Source
September 30	at Ursinus	Collegeville, PA	W 26–0	5,000	
October 7	Gettysburg^{†}	Drexel Field; Philadelphia, PA	W 13–7	8,000	
October 14	Pennsylvania Military	Drexel Field; Philadelphia, PA	W 19–7		
October 28	at Washington College	Kibler Field; Chestertown, MD	W 21–0		
November 4	Western Maryland	Drexel Field; Philadelphia, PA	L 25–26		
November 11	at Swarthmore	Alumni Field; Swarthmore, PA	W 28–7	2,000	
November 18	West Chester	Drexel Field; Philadelphia, PA	W 7–6	8,000	
^{†}Homecoming

== Roster ==
1950 Drexel Dragons football team roster
Players
Coaches
Offense

Pos.	#	Name	Class
TE		Fred Haid
OT	31	Adams
G	22	Tommy Price (C)
C	21	George Rusetski
G		Kim Billings
OT		Silverman
TE		Colson
HB	13	Joe Pietrocarlo
HB	19	Hank Vaders
FB	39	Tom Stazak
QB		Smith
TE	20	Zak Zakarian
TE	28	Fred Yahrling
TE		Dick Spahr
TE	40	Dick Henry
OT		Joe Hefferman
OT		Bill Huster
G		George Ream (injured)
G		John Racine
G	35	Ernie Rodgers
C		Carl Bauer
C		Bob Stewart
HB	15	Joe Bigatel
HB	11	Lew Gerlach (C)
HB	42	Tom Kolongowski
HB	12	Archie Gross	So
HB	29	Art Fischer
HB	14	Harry Connor	So
QB	16	Bobby Brown

Defense

Pos.	#	Name	Class

Special teams

Pos.	#	Name	Class
K	18	Frank Fogarty

Head coach

- Eddie Allen (Penn)

Coordinators/assistant coaches

- Herman Epstein (Maryland)
- Jack Hinkle (Syracuse)
- Tom Miller

Legend

- (C) Team captain
- (S) Suspended
- (I) Ineligible
- Injured
- Redshirt
