= 1950 CCNY Beavers football team =

American college football season

1950 CCNY Beavers football
- Conference: Independent
- Record: 1–7
- Head coach: Irving Mondschein (1st season)
- Home stadium: Lewisohn Stadium

1950 Eastern college football independents records
	Conf.			Overall
Team	W	L	T	W		L		T
Franklin & Marshall		–		9	–	0	–	0
No. 6 Princeton		–		9	–	0	–	0
St. Lawrence		–		8	–	0	–	0
Thiel		–		7	–	0	–	0
No. 2 Army		–		8	–	1	–	0
Fordham		–		8	–	1	–	0
Carnegie Tech		–		7	–	1	–	0
Drexel		–		6	–	1	–	0
Cornell		–		7	–	2	–	0
Gannon		–		6	–	2	–	0
Bucknell		–		6	–	3	–	0
Penn		–		6	–	3	–	0
Yale		–		6	–	3	–	0
Buffalo		–		5	–	3	–	0
Colgate		–		5	–	3	–	0
Penn State		–		5	–	3	–	1
Syracuse		–		5	–	5	–	0
Temple		–		4	–	4	–	1
Tufts		–		4	–	4	–	1
Columbia		–		4	–	5	–	0
Villanova		–		4	–	5	–	0
Holy Cross		–		4	–	5	–	1
Dartmouth		–		3	–	5	–	1
Boston University		–		3	–	5	–	0
Duquesne		–		2	–	6	–	1
Hofstra		–		2	–	6	–	0
NYU		–		1	–	5	–	1
CCNY		–		1	–	7	–	0
Harvard		–		1	–	7	–	0
Brown		–		1	–	8	–	0
Pittsburgh		–		1	–	8	–	0
Boston College		–		0	–	9	–	1
Rankings from AP Poll

The 1950 CCNY Beavers football team was an American football team that represented the City College of New York (CCNY) as an independent during the 1950 college football season. In their first season under Irving Mondschein, the Beavers team compiled a 1–7 record. Mondschein was introduced as head coach in September 1950 after Frank Tubridy resigned for an Army appointment at Fort Totten.

Mondschein, 38 at the time of his appointment as head coach, had played quarterback at CCNY before graduating in 1933. He then played professional football with the Passaic Red Devils of the American Association. Mondeschein worked as the backfield coach at several high schools in the New York metropolitan area and was the head football coach at The High School of Commerce in Manhattan in 1942. He returned to CCNY as backfield coach in 1947, assisting Harold J. Parker for two seasons and then Tubridy in 1949. Mondeschein was not related to fellow New Yorker Irving Mondschein, a well-known decathlete, who had played football at New York University (NYU) in 1946 was coaching at Pennsylvania's Lincoln University in 1950.

CCNY dropped the football program in April 1951 and cited inadequate facilities and finances for its decision.

== Schedule ==
Date	Opponent	Site	Result	Attendance	Source
September 30	Southern Connecticut State	Lewisohn Stadium; New York, NY	L 7–34		
October 7	at Colby	Waterville, ME	L 6–47	2,500	
October 14	Hamilton (NY)	Lewisohn Stadium; New York, NY	L 7–12		
October 21	Wagner	Lewisohn Stadium; New York, NY	L 0–14	3,500	
October 28	at Susquehanna	Selinsgrove, PA	L 6–7		
November 4	at Brooklyn	Ebbets Field; Brooklyn, NY	L 0–12	3,500	
November 11	Upsala	Lewisohn Stadium; New York, NY	L 14–27	200	
November 18	Lowell Textile	Lewisohn Stadium; New York, NY	W 33–6		
