= 1950 Brown Bears football team =

American college football season

1950 Brown Bears football
- Conference: Independent
- Record: 1–8
- Head coach: Gus Zitrides (1st season)
- Home stadium: Brown Stadium

1950 Eastern college football independents records
	Conf.			Overall
Team	W	L	T	W		L		T
Franklin & Marshall		–		9	–	0	–	0
No. 6 Princeton		–		9	–	0	–	0
St. Lawrence		–		8	–	0	–	0
Thiel		–		7	–	0	–	0
No. 2 Army		–		8	–	1	–	0
Fordham		–		8	–	1	–	0
Carnegie Tech		–		7	–	1	–	0
Drexel		–		6	–	1	–	0
Cornell		–		7	–	2	–	0
Gannon		–		6	–	2	–	0
Bucknell		–		6	–	3	–	0
Penn		–		6	–	3	–	0
Yale		–		6	–	3	–	0
Buffalo		–		5	–	3	–	0
Colgate		–		5	–	3	–	0
Penn State		–		5	–	3	–	1
Syracuse		–		5	–	5	–	0
Temple		–		4	–	4	–	1
Tufts		–		4	–	4	–	1
Columbia		–		4	–	5	–	0
Villanova		–		4	–	5	–	0
Holy Cross		–		4	–	5	–	1
Dartmouth		–		3	–	5	–	1
Boston University		–		3	–	5	–	0
Duquesne		–		2	–	6	–	1
Hofstra		–		2	–	6	–	0
NYU		–		1	–	5	–	1
CCNY		–		1	–	7	–	0
Harvard		–		1	–	7	–	0
Brown		–		1	–	8	–	0
Pittsburgh		–		1	–	8	–	0
Boston College		–		0	–	9	–	1
Rankings from AP Poll

The 1950 Brown Bears football team represented Brown University during the 1950 college football season.

In their first and only season under head coach Gus Zitrides, the Bears compiled a 1–8 record, and were outscored 271 to 147. L.H. Hill was the team captain.

Brown played its home games at Brown Stadium in Providence, Rhode Island.

== Schedule ==
Date	Opponent	Site	Result	Attendance	Source
September 30	at Yale	Yale Bowl; New Haven, CT	L 12–36	35,000	
October 7	at Holy Cross	Fitton Field; Worcester, MA	L 21–41	20,000	
October 14	Rhode Island State	Brown Stadium; Providence, RI (rivalry)	W 55–13	12,000	
October 21	Princeton	Brown Stadium; Providence, RI	L 0–34	20,000	
October 28	Colgate	Brown Stadium; Providence, RI	L 34–35	6,000	
November 4	at Rutgers	Rutgers Stadium; Piscataway, NJ	L 12–15	14,000	
November 11	at Penn	Franklin Field; Philadelphia, PA	L 0–50	45,000	
November 18	at Harvard	Harvard Stadium; Boston, MA	L 13–14	11,000	
November 23	Columbia	Brown Stadium; Providence, RI	L 0–33	8,000	
