= Gannon Golden Knights football, 1949–1950 =

American college football seasons

The Gannon Golden Knights football program represented the Gannon College of Arts and Sciences (now known as Gannon University) of Erie, Pennsylvania, as an independent in the sport of American football during the 1949 and 1950 college football seasons. Under head coach Louis J. Tullio, the Golden Knights compiled a perfect 8–0 record in 1949 and a 6–2 record in 1950. Despite the program's success on the field, with a 14–2 overall record and an 87.5% winning percentage, Gannon discontinued the football program after two seasons.

This article covers only the early years of Gannon's college football team, from 1949 until early 1951. The school did not field a football team for the following 38 years.

== 1949 ==
1949 Gannon Golden Knights football
- Conference: Independent
- Record: 8–0
- Head coach: Louis J. Tullio (1st season)

1949 Eastern college football independents records
	Conf.			Overall
Team	W	L	T	W		L		T
Saint Vincent		–		10	–	0	–	0
No. 4 Army		–		9	–	0	–	0
Gannon		–		8	–	0	–	0
Trinity (CT)		–		8	–	0	–	0
Brown		–		8	–	1	–	0
No. 12 Cornell		–		8	–	1	–	0
No. 13 Villanova		–		8	–	1	–	0
Bucknell		–		6	–	2	–	0
Dartmouth		–		6	–	2	–	0
Buffalo		–		6	–	3	–	0
Pittsburgh		–		6	–	3	–	0
Princeton		–		6	–	3	–	0
Fordham		–		5	–	3	–	0
Tufts		–		5	–	3	–	1
Carnegie Tech		–		5	–	3	–	1
Penn State		–		5	–	4	–	0
Temple		–		5	–	4	–	0
Penn		–		4	–	4	–	0
Yale		–		4	–	4	–	0
Boston College		–		4	–	4	–	1
Syracuse		–		4	–	5	–	0
Drexel		–		3	–	3	–	1
Duquesne		–		3	–	6	–	0
Franklin & Marshall		–		2	–	5	–	2
CCNY		–		2	–	5	–	1
NYU		–		3	–	6	–	0
Columbia		–		2	–	7	–	0
Hofstra		–		1	–	5	–	1
Colgate		–		1	–	8	–	0
Harvard		–		1	–	8	–	0
Rankings from AP Poll

In their first year of intercollegiate football, the Golden Knights were led by head coach Louis J. Tullio, compiled a perfect 8–0 record, shut out six of eight opponents, and outscored all opponents by a total of 184 to 20. The 1949 team was the first intercollegiate football team fielded by the Catholic men's college. Gannon did not allow a point to be scored by its opponents until the sixth game of the season, holding opponents scoreless for the first 340 minutes of playing time.

Pete Karuba, a 225-pound junior tackle for Gannon, was selected as a first-team player on the Associated Press All-Pennsylvania college football team. End A. Feeney and back Art "Arky" Arkelian received honorable mention.

=== Schedule ===
Date	Opponent	Site	Result	Attendance	Source
September 25	Alliance	Erie stadium; Erie, PA	W 27–0	5,000	
October 6	Defiance	Erie stadium; Erie, PA	W 19–0	1,500	
October 16	Mount St. Mary's	Erie stadium; Erie, PA	W 25–0		
October 29	at Slippery Rock	Slippery Rock, PA	W 15–0		
November 6	Saint Francis (PA)	Erie stadium; Erie, PA	W 27–0	3,500	
November 11	Loras	Erie stadium; Erie, PA	W 19–7	8,500	
November 18	Ashland	Erie stadium; Erie, PA	W 33–13	3,000	
November 24	at Steubenville	Harding Stadium; Steubenville, OH	W 19–0	400–800	

== 1950 ==
1950 Eastern college football independents records
	Conf.			Overall
Team	W	L	T	W		L		T
Franklin & Marshall		–		9	–	0	–	0
No. 6 Princeton		–		9	–	0	–	0
St. Lawrence		–		8	–	0	–	0
Thiel		–		7	–	0	–	0
No. 2 Army		–		8	–	1	–	0
Fordham		–		8	–	1	–	0
Carnegie Tech		–		7	–	1	–	0
Drexel		–		6	–	1	–	0
Cornell		–		7	–	2	–	0
Gannon		–		6	–	2	–	0
Bucknell		–		6	–	3	–	0
Penn		–		6	–	3	–	0
Yale		–		6	–	3	–	0
Buffalo		–		5	–	3	–	0
Colgate		–		5	–	3	–	0
Penn State		–		5	–	3	–	1
Syracuse		–		5	–	5	–	0
Temple		–		4	–	4	–	1
Tufts		–		4	–	4	–	1
Columbia		–		4	–	5	–	0
Villanova		–		4	–	5	–	0
Holy Cross		–		4	–	5	–	1
Dartmouth		–		3	–	5	–	1
Boston University		–		3	–	5	–	0
Duquesne		–		2	–	6	–	1
Hofstra		–		2	–	6	–	0
NYU		–		1	–	5	–	1
CCNY		–		1	–	7	–	0
Harvard		–		1	–	7	–	0
Brown		–		1	–	8	–	0
Pittsburgh		–		1	–	8	–	0
Boston College		–		0	–	9	–	1
Rankings from AP Poll

In their second year under head coach Louis J. Tullio, the Golden Knights compiled a 6–2 record and outscored opponents by a total of 222 to 119.

=== Schedule ===
Date	Opponent	Site	Result	Attendance	Source
September 21	Findlay	Erie stadium; Erie, PA	W 34–2		
September 28	Alma	Erie stadium; Erie, PA	W 20–2	3,000	
October 6	Wilmington (OH)	Erie stadium; Erie, PA	W 34–20		
October 14	at Scranton	Dunmore High School stadium; Dumore, PA	L 7–34	6,000	
October 20	Ashland	Erie stadium; Erie, PA	W 56–12		
October 27	Hillsdale	Erie stadium; Erie, PA	W 27–14		
November 10	Morris Harvey	Erie stadium; Erie, PA	L 13–35	3,000	
November 17	Adrian	Erie stadium; Erie, PA	W 31–0		
	Kings College		Cancelled due to weather		

== Termination of program ==
On April 6, 1951, the Gannon board of control voted to discontinue the football program. The college's president, Joseph J. Werle, said at the time: "In our considered judgment, the financial resources of the college can be more wisely expended in enlarging student participation in a broad intramural athletic program. They can also be used to encourage activities more closely allied to our educational objectives." The press blamed the program's demise on "apathy of the fans at the turnstiles". An editorial in The Lake Shore Visitor-Register also attributed the decision to decreased enrollment due to students being inducted in the military due to the Korean War and noted: "Instead of waving banners in the stadium next fall football fans should wear mourning bands. Football is dead at Gannon."

Gannon's decision was part of a trend among Catholic colleges in 1950 and 1951 to drop intercollegiate football. Other Catholic colleges making the same decision included Georgetown (discontinued in 1951), Canisius (discontinued in 1950), Duquesne (discontinued in 1951), Niagara (discontinued in 1951), Steubenville, and Saint Mary's (discontinued in 1951). The San Francisco Dons and Loyola Lions also discontinued their football program after the 1951 season, as did the Santa Clara Broncos after the 1952 season.

For the 1951 season, nine of Gannon's football players transferred to Western Reserve University and joined the football team there. Despite terminating the football program, Gannon retained coach Tullio as athletic director and auditorium manager. He also served as the school's golf and basketball coach. Tullio later served six terms as Mayor of Erie from 1966 to 1989.

After the 1950 season, Gannon did not field a college football team for the next 38 years, until 1989.
