= 1950 Villanova Wildcats football team =

American college football season

1950 Villanova Wildcats football
- Conference: Independent
- Record: 4–5
- Head coach: Jim Leonard (2nd season)
- Captain: Raymond Mantone
- Home stadium: Franklin Field, Villanova Stadium

1950 Eastern college football independents records
	Conf.			Overall
Team	W	L	T	W		L		T
Franklin & Marshall		–		9	–	0	–	0
No. 6 Princeton		–		9	–	0	–	0
St. Lawrence		–		8	–	0	–	0
Thiel		–		7	–	0	–	0
No. 2 Army		–		8	–	1	–	0
Fordham		–		8	–	1	–	0
Carnegie Tech		–		7	–	1	–	0
Drexel		–		6	–	1	–	0
Cornell		–		7	–	2	–	0
Gannon		–		6	–	2	–	0
Bucknell		–		6	–	3	–	0
Penn		–		6	–	3	–	0
Yale		–		6	–	3	–	0
Buffalo		–		5	–	3	–	0
Colgate		–		5	–	3	–	0
Penn State		–		5	–	3	–	1
Syracuse		–		5	–	5	–	0
Temple		–		4	–	4	–	1
Tufts		–		4	–	4	–	1
Columbia		–		4	–	5	–	0
Villanova		–		4	–	5	–	0
Holy Cross		–		4	–	5	–	1
Dartmouth		–		3	–	5	–	1
Boston University		–		3	–	5	–	0
Duquesne		–		2	–	6	–	1
Hofstra		–		2	–	6	–	0
NYU		–		1	–	5	–	1
CCNY		–		1	–	7	–	0
Harvard		–		1	–	7	–	0
Brown		–		1	–	8	–	0
Pittsburgh		–		1	–	8	–	0
Boston College		–		0	–	9	–	1
Rankings from AP Poll

The 1950 Villanova Wildcats football team represented the Villanova University during the 1950 college football season. The head coach was Jim Leonard, coaching his second season with the Wildcats. The team played their home games at Villanova Stadium in Villanova, Pennsylvania.

== Schedule ==
Date	Opponent	Site	Result	Attendance	Source
September 23	Duquesne	Villanova Stadium; Villanova, PA	W 39–28		
October 6	at Miami (FL)	Burdine Stadium; Miami, FL	L 12–18	35,294	
October 14	at Tulsa	Skelly Field; Tulsa, OK	L 7–27	17,500	
October 21	No. 4 Kentucky	Franklin Field; Philadelphia, PA	L 7–34	17,000	
October 28	at Georgetown	Griffith Stadium; Washington, DC	W 20–14	5,192	
November 4	at Detroit	University of Detroit Stadium; Detroit, MI	L 7–18	8,775	
November 18	at Boston College	Braves Field; Boston, MA	W 29–7	6,281	
November 24	at LSU	Tiger Stadium; Baton Rouge, LA	L 7–13	10,000	
December 3	at Saint Mary's	Kezar Stadium; San Francisco, CA	W 13–7	200	
Rankings from AP Poll released prior to the game
