= 1950 Princeton Tigers football team =

American college football season

1950 Princeton Tigers football

National champion (Poling System, Boand System) Eastern champion
- Conference: Independent

Ranking
- Coaches: No. 8
- AP: No. 6
- Record: 9–0
- Head coach: Charlie Caldwell (6th season)
- Offensive scheme: Unbalanced single-wing
- Captain: George A. Chandler
- Home stadium: Palmer Stadium

1950 Eastern college football independents records
	Conf.			Overall
Team	W	L	T	W		L		T
Franklin & Marshall		–		9	–	0	–	0
No. 6 Princeton		–		9	–	0	–	0
St. Lawrence		–		8	–	0	–	0
Thiel		–		7	–	0	–	0
No. 2 Army		–		8	–	1	–	0
Fordham		–		8	–	1	–	0
Carnegie Tech		–		7	–	1	–	0
Drexel		–		6	–	1	–	0
Cornell		–		7	–	2	–	0
Gannon		–		6	–	2	–	0
Bucknell		–		6	–	3	–	0
Penn		–		6	–	3	–	0
Yale		–		6	–	3	–	0
Buffalo		–		5	–	3	–	0
Colgate		–		5	–	3	–	0
Penn State		–		5	–	3	–	1
Syracuse		–		5	–	5	–	0
Temple		–		4	–	4	–	1
Tufts		–		4	–	4	–	1
Columbia		–		4	–	5	–	0
Villanova		–		4	–	5	–	0
Holy Cross		–		4	–	5	–	1
Dartmouth		–		3	–	5	–	1
Boston University		–		3	–	5	–	0
Duquesne		–		2	–	6	–	1
Hofstra		–		2	–	6	–	0
NYU		–		1	–	5	–	1
CCNY		–		1	–	7	–	0
Harvard		–		1	–	7	–	0
Brown		–		1	–	8	–	0
Pittsburgh		–		1	–	8	–	0
Boston College		–		0	–	9	–	1
Rankings from AP Poll

The 1950 Princeton Tigers football team represented Princeton University in National Collegiate Athletic Association (NCAA) intercollegiate competition during the 1950 season. The Tigers were led by sixth-year head coach Charlie Caldwell, a future College Football Hall of Fame inductee, who utilized an "unbalanced" version of the single-wing formation.

The Princeton offense, which made use of the buck-lateral series, was one of the last successful employers of the single-wing formation, which had been made obsolete by the modernized T formation. The team ranked second nationally in total offense (433.7 yards per game), rushing offense (325.4 yards per game), and rushing defense (67.9 yards per game).

Princeton finished with a perfect undefeated record of 9–0, and the Tigers outscored their opponents 349–94. Against other future Ivy League teams, Princeton compiled a 5–0 record.

Some selectors named Princeton the national champions, most notably the NCAA-recognized Poling System and Boand System. Princeton was ranked sixth in the Associated Press and eighth in the United Press final polls. After the season, Tigers halfback Dick Kazmaier, tackle Holland Donan, and center Redmond Finney received first-team All-America honors. Kazmaier and Donan were eventually inducted into the College Football Hall of Fame.

== Schedule ==
Date	Opponent	Rank	Site	Result	Attendance	Source
September 30	Williams		Palmer Stadium; Princeton, NJ	W 66–0	18,000	
October 7	Rutgers		Palmer Stadium; Princeton, NJ (rivalry)	W 34–28	23,000	
October 14	Navy		Palmer Stadium; Princeton, NJ	W 20–14	35,000	
October 21	at Brown		Brown Stadium; Providence, RI	W 34–0	20,000	
October 28	No. 10 Cornell		Palmer Stadium; Princeton, NJ	W 27–0	47,500	
November 4	Colgate	No. 10	Palmer Stadium; Princeton, NJ	W 45–7	19,000	
November 11	Harvard	No. 8	Palmer Stadium; Princeton, NJ (rivalry)	W 63–26	25,000	
November 18	at Yale	No. 7	Yale Bowl; New Haven, CT (rivalry)	W 47–12	59,000	
November 25	Dartmouth	No. 7	Palmer Stadium; Princeton, NJ	W 13–7	5,000	
Rankings from AP Poll released prior to the game
