= 1950 Pittsburgh Panthers football team =

American college football season

1950 Pittsburgh Panthers football
- Conference: Independent
- Record: 1–8
- Head coach: Len Casanova (1st season)
- Home stadium: Pitt Stadium

1950 Eastern college football independents records
	Conf.			Overall
Team	W	L	T	W		L		T
Franklin & Marshall		–		9	–	0	–	0
No. 6 Princeton		–		9	–	0	–	0
St. Lawrence		–		8	–	0	–	0
Thiel		–		7	–	0	–	0
No. 2 Army		–		8	–	1	–	0
Fordham		–		8	–	1	–	0
Carnegie Tech		–		7	–	1	–	0
Drexel		–		6	–	1	–	0
Cornell		–		7	–	2	–	0
Gannon		–		6	–	2	–	0
Bucknell		–		6	–	3	–	0
Penn		–		6	–	3	–	0
Yale		–		6	–	3	–	0
Buffalo		–		5	–	3	–	0
Colgate		–		5	–	3	–	0
Penn State		–		5	–	3	–	1
Syracuse		–		5	–	5	–	0
Temple		–		4	–	4	–	1
Tufts		–		4	–	4	–	1
Columbia		–		4	–	5	–	0
Villanova		–		4	–	5	–	0
Holy Cross		–		4	–	5	–	1
Dartmouth		–		3	–	5	–	1
Boston University		–		3	–	5	–	0
Duquesne		–		2	–	6	–	1
Hofstra		–		2	–	6	–	0
NYU		–		1	–	5	–	1
CCNY		–		1	–	7	–	0
Harvard		–		1	–	7	–	0
Brown		–		1	–	8	–	0
Pittsburgh		–		1	–	8	–	0
Boston College		–		0	–	9	–	1
Rankings from AP Poll

The 1950 Pittsburgh Panthers football team represented the University of Pittsburgh as an independent during the 1950 college football season. The team compiled a 1–8 record under head coach Len Casanova.

== Schedule ==
Date	Opponent	Site	Result	Attendance	Source
September 30	at No. 16 Duke	Duke Stadium; Durham, NC	L 14–28	25,000	
October 7	at Ohio State	Ohio Stadium; Columbus, OH	L 7–41	73,137	
October 14	No. 15 Rice	Pitt Stadium; Pittsburgh, PA	L 7–14	21,061	
October 21	at No. 20 Northwestern	Dyche Stadium; Evanston, IL	L 23–28	35,000	
October 28	No. 11 Miami (FL)	Pitt Stadium; Pittsburgh, PA	L 0–28	24,537	
November 4	West Virginia	Pitt Stadium; Pittsburgh, PA (rivalry)	W 21–7	6,125	
November 11	at Notre Dame	Notre Dame Stadium; Notre Dame, IN (rivalry)	L 7–18	56,966	
November 18	No. 10 Michigan State	Pitt Stadium; Pittsburgh, PA	L 0–19	28,679	
December 2	Penn State	Forbes Field; Pittsburgh, PA (rivalry)	L 20–21	7,000–12,250	
Rankings from AP Poll released prior to the game

== Preseason ==
On January 27, The Pittsburgh Press reported that Pitt head coach Mike Milligan resigned. His initial three-year contract expired, and he was offered a one-year renewal. He negotiated for a multi-year offer similar to his initial deal, but the Athletic Department did not grant his request.

On February 16, the executive committee of Pitt's Board of Trustees approved the hiring of Len Casanova as the head football coach, plus Herman Meister and Jack Roche as assistants. Casanova received a four-year deal at $12,000 per year. Coach Casanova was a proponent of the T-formation, which was different from the single wing offense run by Coach Milligan.

On March 9, 160 prospects met with Coach Casanova for the start of spring drills. The varsity and freshmen candidates reported on March 22. The spring session ended on May 13 with an intra-squad game. The Blues beat the Golds 54–6 in front of 1,000 fans. On September 3, 57 Panthers bussed to fall camp at Allegheny College in Meadville, PA for two weeks of pre-season training. On September 16, after a morning intra-squad scrimmage, the team returned to Pittsburgh. Coach Casanova continued two-a-days for the next week on Trees Field in preparation for their opening game on September 30 at Duke.

== Coaching staff ==
1950 Pittsburgh Panthers football staff
Coaching staff: Len Casanova – head coach; Herman Meister – line coach; Jack Roche – backfield coach; Robert Timmons – assistant end coach; Steve Petro – jayvee coach; Wilbur Forsythe – assistant freshman coach; John Chickerneo– freshman coach	Support staff: Thomas J. Hamilton – director of athletics and physical education; Frank Carver – graduate manager; Bill Heyman – publicity director; Dr. Ralph Shanor – team physician; Dr. Dan Dickinson – team physician; Howard Waite – trainer; Bill Haines – equipment manager; Jim Ventura – student manager

== Roster ==
1950 Pittsburgh Panthers football roster
Player	Position	Games	Weight	Height	Class	Prep school	Hometown
Fred Botti*	quarterback	5	190	6 ft 1 in	senior	Connellsville H. S.	North Union, PA
James Jennings*	quarterback	7	170	6 ft	sophomore	Central Catholic H. S.	Pittsburgh, PA
Bob Bestwick*	quarterback	8	180	5 ft 11 in	junior	Shaler H. S.	Shaler Township, PA
Bill Doziski	quarterback	0	175	5 ft 11 in	junior	Donora H. S.	Donora, OH
Robert Osterhout*	quarterback	7	190	5 ft 11 in	sophomore	Rutherford H. S.	Rutherford, NJ
Warren Walton	fullback	0	170	5 ft 10 in	sophomore	Donora H. S.	Donora, PA
Dave Fyock*	left halfback	6	170	5 ft 8 in	junior	Evans City H. S.	Evans City, PA
Armond DiFonso*	left halfback	7	175	5 ft 9 in	junior	Jeannette H. S.	Jeannette, PA
Joseph Kirtik	right halfback	1	190	6 ft	sophomore	German Twp. H. S.	McClellandtown, PA
William Reynolds*	right halfback	8	180	5 ft 11 in	sophomore	St. Mary's H. S.	St. Mary's, WV
William Sichko*	left halfback	9	170	6 ft	junior	German Twp. H.S.	McClellandtown, PA
Joe O'Bara	right halfback	0	175	5 ft 8 in	senior	Johnstown H. S.	Johnstown, PA
Joseph Capp*	fullback	7	190	5 ft 10 in	sophomore	Newton Falls H. S.	Newton Falls, OH
Anthony Simile*	left halfback	6	175	5 ft 10 in	sophomore	Allegheny H. S.	Pittsburgh, PA
James Campbell*	right halfback	9	190	5 ft 9 in	junior	Hershey H. S.	Derry Township, PA
Frank Guadagnino	fullback	4	175	5 ft 10 in	sophomore	Westinghouse H. S.	Pittsburgh, PA
Joseph Schmidt*	fullback	9	200	6 ft 1 in	sophomore	Brentwood H. S.	Brentwood, PA
Gabe Gembarosky*	center	9	200	6 ft	sophomore	Donora H. S.	Donora, PA
George Radosevich*	center	9	205	6 ft 2 in	senior	Brentwood H. S.	Brentwood, PA
John Dazio*	center	8	200	6 ft	junior	Coatesville H. S.	Coatesville, PA
William Ewing	fullback	3	190	5 ft 10 in	junior	Peabody H. S.	Pittsburgh, PA
Stuart Kline	center	3	190	6 ft	sophomore	Johnstown H. S.	Johnstown, PA
Michael Boldin *	right guard	9	200	6 ft	senior	Johnstown H. S.	Johnstown, PA
Francis Baron	left guard	0	185	6 ft	sophomore	Nanticoke H. S.	Nanticoke, PA
Anthony Romantino*	left guard	6	175	5 ft 9 in	sophomore	Donora H. S.	Donora, PA
Norman Chizmar	left guard	0	190	6 ft	sophomore	Highland H. S.	Highland, IN
Rudy Andabaker*	left guard	9	180	6 ft	junior	Donora H. S.	Donora, PA
Larry Pierce	right guard	3	180	5 ft 10 in	senior	Jeannette H. S.	Jeannette, PA
Merle DeLuca*	right guard	9	200	5 ft 9 in	sophomore	Westinghouse H. S.	Pittsburgh, PA
Charles Thomas*	right guard	7	190	6 ft 2 in	senior	Dormont H. S.	Dormont, PA
Donald Karanovich*	left guard	8	200	6 ft 2 in	senior	Irwin H. S.	Irwin, PA
Frank DiLeo	right guard	2	180	5 ft 10 in	sophomore	Westinghouse H. S.	Pittsburgh, PA
Sam DeFede	right tackle	2	210	6 ft	senior	Martins Ferry H. S.	Martins Ferry, OH
Eugene Dolfi	left tackle	0	190	6 ft 1 in	sophomore	Rostraver H. S.	Rostraver Township, PA
Nick Bolkovac*	left tackle	9	225	6 ft 2 in	senior	Youngstown H. S.	Youngstown, OH
Bob Brennen*	left tackle	8	215	6 ft 2 in	junior	North Catholic H. S.	Pittsburgh, PA
Alfred Smalara	left tackle	0	195	6 ft	junior	Springdale H. S.	Springdale, PA
John Stoken	left tackle	2	210	6 ft 1 in	junior	Aliquippa H. S.	Aliquippa, PA
Charles Yost	right tackle	1	210	6 ft	senior	Youngstown H. S.	Youngstown, OH
Robert Mihm	right tackle	2	220	6 ft	senior	Westinghouse H. S.	Pittsburgh, PA
William Gasparovic*	right tackle	8	205	6 ft 1 in	junior	Steelton H.S.	Steelton, PA
Flint Greene*	left tackle	8	200	5 ft 10 in	senior	New Kensington H. S.	New Kensington, PA
Joseph Bozek*	right end	9	190	6 ft 1 in	sophomore	Rochester H. S.	Rochester, PA
Chris Warriner*	left end	9	195	5 ft 11 in	senior	Tarentum H. S.	Tarentum, PA
Ted Geremsky *	left end	8	210	6 ft 4 in	senior	Braddock H. S.	Braddock, PA
Andrew Lelik	right end	0	210	6 ft 2 in	junior	Donora H. S.	Donora, PA
George Glagola*	left end	8	190	6 ft 2 in	sophomore	German Twp. H. S.	McClellandtown, PA
Nick DeRosa*	right end	9	195	6 ft 1 in	senior	Donora H. S.	Donora, PA
Harry Hollihan	left end	0	195	6 ft 1 in	senior	Glenshaw H. S.	Shaler, PA
John Masarick*	right end	6	195	6 ft 1 in	senior	Har-Brack H. S.	Tarentum, PA
Joseph Koval	left end	0	185	5 ft 11 in	sophomore	Monessen H. S.	Monessen, PA
John Coyne	right end	0	185	5 ft 10 in	junior	Munhall H. S.	Munhall, PA
Joseph Kane	left guard	0	185	5 ft 9 in	sophomore	Munhall H. S.	Munhall, PA
Edward Warnet	left tackle	0	200	6 ft	sophomore	West Hazleton H. S.	West Hazleton, PA
John Machisic	right tackle	0	210	5 ft 11 in	sophomore	Turtle Creek H. S.	Turtle Creek, PA
Walt Bielich	right tackle	0	200	6 ft 1 in	junior	Youngstown H. S.	Youngstown, OH
Paul Chess^	halfback	0	185	6 ft	sophomore	Meadville H. S.	Meadville, PA
John Huzvar^	fullback	3	235	6 ft 3 in	sophomore	Hershey. H.S.	Hershey, PA
Mike Omatick^	quarterback	0	180	5 ft 11 in	sophomore	Connellsville H. S.	Connellsville, PA
^ Drafted into the Marines, * Letterman

== Game summaries ==
=== at Duke ===
Week 1: Pitt at Duke

Team	1	2	3	4	Total
Pitt	0	0	7	7	14
• Duke	0	0	14	14	28

- Date: September 30, 1950
- Location: Duke Stadium
  Durham, NC
- Game start: 2:30 p.m.
- Game attendance: 25,000
- Game weather: partly cloudy and mild
- Referee: Paul Swaffield (Brown)

Scoring summary
3	PITT	Bill Sichko 85-yard run (Nick Bolkovac kick)	PITT 7–0
3	DUKE	Tom Powers 22-yard pass from Billy Cox (Mike Souchak kick)	TIED 7–7
3	DUKE	Tom Powers 8-yard pass from Glenn Wilde (Souchak kick)	DUKE 14–7
4	PITT	Armand DiFonso 8-yard run (Bolkovac kick )	TIED 14–14
4	DUKE	Jack Mounie 1-yard run ( Souchak kick )	DUKE 21–14
4	DUKE	Bob Bicket 60-yard pass interception ( Souchak kick )	DUKE 28–14

Len Casanova's Panthers opened their season against Wallace Wade's Duke Blue Devils in Durham, North Carolina. Duke led the all-time series 4–3 and was a 12-point favorite to win this game. The Blue Devils were 1–0, having beaten South Carolina in their opening game. Duke end, Blaine Earon, was named AP Defense first team All-American and back Billy Cox received first team honors from Colliers.

Pitt tackle, Flint Greene, was the first African-American to play in a game against the Blue Devils at Duke.

After a scoreless first half, the Panthers managed to score two touchdowns in the second half, but they gave up four and lost to the Blue Devils 28–14. Pitt halfback, Bill Sichko, returned the second half kick-off 85 yards to put the Panthers on the scoreboard first. Nick Bolkovac added the extra point and Pitt led 7–0. Duke countered with two third quarter touchdowns. A Billy Cox 22-yard touchdown pass to Tom Powers was followed by a Glenn Wild 8-yard touchdown pass to Powers. Mike Souchak (brother of former Panther Frank Souchak) converted both placements. Early in the fourth quarter, the Panthers tied the game on a 7-yard run by Armand DiFonso and Bolkovac kick. The Devils again countered with two scores. A 59-yard drive ended with a 1-yard touchdown plunge by Jack Mounie. Then Bob Bicket intercepted a Bob Bestwick pass and raced 60 yards for the final score. Souchak added the extra points.

The Pitt starting lineup for the game against Duke was Ted Geremsky (left end), Nick Bolkovac (left tackle), Rudy Andabaker (left guard), George Radosevich (center), Mike Boldin (right guard), Charles Yost (right tackle), Nick DeRosa (right end), Bob Bestwick (quarterback), Bill Sichko (left halfback), Bill Reynolds (right halfback) and John Huzvar (fullback). Substitutes appearing in the game for Pitt were Chris Warriner, George Glagola, Flint Greene, Bob Brennen, Charles Thomas, Gabe Gembarosky, Robert Mihm, John Dazio, Don Karanovich, Merle DeLuca, Bill Gasparovic, Joseph Bozek, John Masarick, Fred Botti, Armand DiFonso, Anthony Simile, James Campbell and Joe Schmidt.

=== at Ohio State ===
Week 2: Pitt at Ohio State

Team	1	2	3	4	Total
Pitt	0	0	0	7	7
• Ohio State	21	20	0	0	41

- Date: October 7, 1950
- Location: Ohio Stadium
  Columbus, OH
- Game start: 2:00 p.m.
- Game attendance: 73,137
- Game weather: cloudy and warm
- Referee: Lyle M. Clarno (Bradley)

Scoring summary
1	OSU	Ray Hamilton 9-yard pass from Vic Janowicz (kick missed)	OSU 6–0
1	OSU	Tom Watson 47-yard pass from Janowicz (kick missed)	OSU 12–0
1	OSU	Bob Momsen blocked Chris Warriner's punt out of the end zone for a safety	OSU 14–0
1	OSU	Sherwin Gandee 6-yard pass from Janowicz ( Janowicz pass to Watson )	OSU 21–0
2	OSU	Walt Klevay 74-yard run ( Janowicz kick )	OSU 28–0
2	OSU	Tony Curcilla 61-yard pass from Janowicz ( Janowicz kick )	OSU 35–0
2	OSU	Richard Doyle 2-yard run (kick missed)	OSU 41–0
4	PITT	George Glagola 12-yard pass from Bob Bestwick ( Nick Bolkovac kick )	OSU 41–7

On October 7, the Panthers traveled west to Columbus, OH to play the Ohio State Buckeyes. Ohio State led the all-time series 10–3–1. Wes Fesler's squad was 0–1, after losing to SMU (32–27) in their home opener. The Buckeyes had talent: Heisman Trophy winner, Vic Janowicz at halfback; All-American linemen Bob Momsen and Bob McCullough; plus All-Big Ten linemen John Biltz and Bill Trautwein.

Coach Casanova altered the line-up: Right tackle Charles Yost, injured against Duke and lost for the season, was replaced by Bill Gasparovic; Injured left end Ted Geremsky was replaced by Chris Warriner; Armand DiFonso started at quarterback, and Joe Schmidt started at fullback.

In front of 73,137 fans, Ohio State routed the Panthers 41–7. The Panthers defense could not stop Heisman Trophy winner Vic Janowicz. In his one half of playing time, he threw six passes, completed them all, and four went for touchdowns. He converted three extra points. Buckeye halfbacks Walt Klevay and Richard Doyle each added a rushing touchdown and Richard Momsen blocked a punt out of the end zone for a safety. Ohio State led 41–0 at halftime, and Coach Fesler used his reserves in the second half. The Panthers scored in the final two minutes on an 86-yard march. Bob Bestwick completed four straight passes for the score: 47 yards to Nick DeRosa, 5 yards to Bill Reynolds, 22 yards to Bill Sichko and 12 yards to George Glagola. Nick Bolkovac kicked the extra point.

The Pitt starting lineup for the game against Ohio State was Chris Warriner (left end), Nick Bolkovac (left tackle), Rudy Andabaker (left guard), John Dazio (center), Mike Boldin (right guard), Bill Gasparovic (right tackle), Nick DeRosa (right end), Armand DiFonso (quarterback), Bill Sichko (left halfback), Bill Reynolds (right halfback) and Joe Schmidt (fullback). Substitutes appearing in the game for Pitt were George Glagola, Flint Greene, John Stoken, Bob Brennen, Gabe Gembarosky, Robert Mihm, Don Karanovich, Merle DeLuca, Joseph Bozek, John Masarick, Fred Botti, Anthony Simile, James Campbell, John Huzvar, Larry Pierce, Anthony Romantino, George Radosevich, William Ewing, Stuart Kline, Frank DiLeo, Bob Bestwick, Bob Osterhout, James Jennings, Joseph Capp and David Fyock.

=== Rice ===
Week 3: Rice at Pitt

Team	1	2	3	4	Total
• Rice	0	7	7	0	14
Pitt	0	7	0	0	7

- Date: October 14, 1950
- Location: Pitt Stadium
  Pittsburgh, PA
- Game start: 2:00 p.m.
- Game attendance: 21,061
- Game weather: rain

Scoring summary
2	PITT	Bob Bestwick ran 3-yards ( Nick Bolkovac kick)	PITT 7–0
2	RICE	Billy Burkhalter 1-yard run ( Billy Wright kick)	TIED 7–7
3	RICE	Bill Howton 4-yard pass from Vernon Glass ( Wright kick )	RICE 14–7

For their home opener, the Panthers scheduled Jeff Neely's, 1950 Cotton Bowl and 1949 Southwest Conference, champion Rice Owls. Rice was on an 11-game win streak and was a two touchdown favorite over the Panthers.

Pitt coach Len Casanova decided to utilize the two-platoon system. He told The Pitt News: "Instead of dividing up the players practice time between offense and defense, we can concentrate on defense with one group and offense with another. We expect to have an offensive and defensive line to throw against Rice, but we don't have the backfield material to be exclusively a two-platoon team."

On a rainy day in Pittsburgh, the Panthers jumped out to a 7–0 lead in the second quarter, but could not contain the Rice aerial game and lost to the Owls 14–7. The Panthers recovered a Rice fumble in the first quarter on the Owls 13-yard line. The offense had to settle for a Nick Bolkovac field goal try that missed. Late in the period, Panther halfback Bill Reynolds intercepted a Vernon Glass pass and returned it to the Rice 27-yard line. On the third play of the second quarter, Bob Bestwick scored from the 3-yard line and Bolkovac added the extra point. The Owls answered with a touchdown right before halftime. They received the second half kick-off and scored again. The Panthers threatened 5 times in the final half, but the Owl defense kept them out of the end zone. Halfback Bill Sichko (concussion) and quarterback Bob Bestwick (knee) did not play in the second half.

The Pitt starting lineup for the game against Rice was Chris Warriner (left end), Flint Greene (left tackle), Rudy Andabaker (left guard), John Dazio (center), Merle DeLuca (right guard), Bob Brennen (right tackle), Nick DeRosa (right end), Bob Bestwick (quarterback), Bill Sichko (left halfback), Bill Reynolds (right halfback) and Joseph Capp (fullback). Substitutes appearing in the game for Pitt were George Glagola, Ted Geremsky, Nick Bolkovac, Charles Thomas, Gabe Gembarosky, Don Karanovich, Mike Boldin, Joseph Bozek, Fred Botti, Anthony Simile, James Campbell, John Huzvar, Anthony Romantino, George Radosevich, William Ewing, Stuart Kline, Bob Osterhout, Bill Gasparovic, James Jennings, Armand DiFonso and Joseph Schmidt.

=== at Northwestern ===
Week 4: Pitt at Northwestern

Team	1	2	3	4	Total
Pitt	0	0	0	23	23
• Northwestern	7	14	7	0	28

- Date: October 21, 1950
- Location: Dyche Stadium
  Evanston, IL
- Game start: 2:00 p.m.
- Game attendance: 30,000
- Game weather: fair and warm
- Referee: Mike Layden (Notre Dame)

Scoring summary
1	NW	Don Stonesifer pass from Dick Flowers ( Bob Burson kick)	NW 7–0
2	NW	Burt Keddie 15-yard pass from Flowers ( Burson kick)	NW 14–0
2	NW	Stonesifer 11-yard pass from Burson ( Burson kick)	NW 21–0
3	NW	Keddie 4-yard pass from Flowers ( Burson kick )	NW 28–0
4	PITT	Bob Osterhout 1-yard run ( Nick Bolkovac kick)	NW 28–7
4	PITT	George Glagola tackled Johnny Miller in the end zone for a safety	NW 28–9
4	PITT	Chris Warriner 33-yard pass from Osterhout ( Bolkovac kick)	NW 28–16
4	PITT	Nick DeRosa 3-yard pass from Osterhout ( Bolkovac kick)	NW 28–23

The Panthers fourth game of the season was against the Northwestern Wildcats at Evanston, IL. The Wildcats were undefeated (3–0), and on a five-game win streak. Wildcat Don Stonesifer was named first team end on the Associated Press-Offense All-American squad.

Coach Casanova had to deal with injuries and military assignments. Mike Boldin and Don Karanovich, army reservists, were given their physicals by the Army and were awaiting orders. The Marines updated their orders for Chris Warriner and Bill Gasparovic. They were able to stay in school until mid-November. James Campbell failed his Marine physical. Bob Bestwick's knee did not respond to treatment and he did not play. Joe Schmidt hurt his shoulder in the Rice game. Joe Capp was nursing a sore ankle. Bill Sichko was back in the lineup.

Pitt suffered their fourth loss in a row, 28–23. After three quarters, the Panthers were behind 28–0. In the final quarter, Pitt guard, Mke Boldin recovered a Northwestern fumble on the Wildcat 18-yard line. Third-string quarterback, Bob Osterhout scored from the 1-yard line. Nick Bolkovac kicked the extra point. After a second exchange of punts, Northwestern had possession on their 17-yard line. A penalty moved them back to their 2-yard line. On first down, Pitt end George Galoga tackled Wildcat Johnny Miller in the end zone, and the score was 28–9. Northwestern kicked off from the 20-yard line and Pitt gained possession on the Wildcat 47-yard line. On the third play, Osterhout threw a 33-yard touchdown pass to Chris Warriner. Bolkovac kicked the extra point to make it 28–16. Less than 3 minutes remained in the game. George Galoga recovered the on-sides kick for the Panthers on the Northwestern 45-yard line. Osterhout completed 2 passes to move the ball to the 3-yard line. He threw an incompletion, and then he passed to Nick DeRosa for the score. Bolkovac made it 28–23 with 30 seconds to go. The Wildcats recovered the on-sides kick and ran out the clock.

The Pitt starting lineup for the game against Northwestern was Chris Warriner (left end), Flint Greene (left tackle), Charles Thomas (left guard), John Dazio (center), Mike Boldin (right guard), Bob Brennen (right tackle), Nick DeRosa (right end), Fred Botti (quarterback), Bill Sichko (left halfback), Bill Reynolds (right halfback) and Joseph Capp (fullback). Substitutes appearing in the game for Pitt were George Glagola, Ted Geremsky, Larry Pierce, John Stoken, Nick Bolkovac, Rudy Andabaker, Anthony Romantino, Gabe Gembarosky, George Radosevich, Stuart Kline, Don Karanovich, Merle DeLuca, Frank DiLeo, Bill Gasparovic, Sam DeFede, Joseph Bozek, John Masarick, Bob Osterhout, Armand DiFonso, David Fyock, Anthony Simile, James Campbell, James Jennings and Joe Schmidt.

=== Miami ===
Week 5: Miami at Pitt

Team	1	2	3	4	Total
• Miami	0	7	7	14	28
Pitt	0	0	0	0	0

- Date: October 28, 1950
- Location: Pitt Stadium
  Pittsburgh, PA
- Game start: 2:00 p.m.
- Game attendance: 24,537
- Game weather: warm

Scoring summary
2	MIAMI	Jack DelBello 1-yard run ( Gordon Watson kick)	MIAMI 7–0
3	MIAMI	Frank Smith 15-yard run (Watson kick)	MIAMI 14–0
4	MIAMI	Ed Lutes 27-yard pass from Jack Hackett (Watson kick)	MIAMI 21–0
4	MIAMI	Lutes 15-yard pass from Hackett ( Watson kick )	MIAMI 28–0

The Panthers second home game was against the #11 ranked Miami Hurricanes, coached by former Pitt running back Andy Gustafson (1923–25). The Canes were 4–0, and led by All-America first team AP defensive tackle Al Carapella, . 15 Hurricanes were from the Pittsburgh area.

Miami ruined Pitt's Homecoming by defeating the Panthers 28–0. The Hurricane defense kept the Panthers out of their territory for the entire first half. The Miami offense scored late in the second quarter on a 38-yard drive. Jack DelBello scored on a quarterback sneak and Gordon Watson booted the extra point for a 7–0 halftime lead. Miami halfback Frank Smith added a 15-yard touchdown run in the third quarter. McKeesport, PA natives, quarterback Jack Hackett and end Ed Lutes, connected for two touchdown passes in the final period to cement the Miami victory. Watson converted the placements. The Panthers penetrated to the Miami 18-yard line late in the game, but the Hurricanes intercepted a Panther pass to stop the drive.

The Pitt starting lineup for the game against Miami was Chris Warriner (left end), Nick Bolkovac (left tackle), Rudy Andabaker (left guard), John Dazio (center), Merle DeLuca (right guard), Bob Brennen (right tackle), Nick DeRosa (right end), Fred Botti (quarterback), Bill Sichko (left halfback), Bill Reynolds (right halfback) and Joe Schmidt (fullback). Substitutes appearing in the game for Pitt were George Glagola, Ted Geremsky, Larry Pierce, Flint Greene, Charles Thomas, Gabe Gembarosky, George Radosevich, Don Karanovich, Mike Boldin, Bill Gasparovic, Sam DeFede, Joseph Bozek, Bob Osterhout, Armand DiFonso, David Fyock, Anthony Simile, Bob Bestwick, Frank Guadagnino, James Campbell, James Jennings and Joseph Capp.

=== West Virginia ===
Week 6: West Virginia at Pitt

Team	1	2	3	4	Total
West Virginia	0	0	0	7	7
• Pitt	14	0	7	0	21

- Date: November 4, 1950
- Location: Pitt Stadium
  Pittsburgh, PA
- Game start: 2:00 p.m.
- Game attendance: 6,125
- Game weather: torrential rain

Scoring summary
1	PITT	Bill Reynolds 17-yard pass from Bob Bestwick ( Nick Bolkovac kick)	PITT 7–0
1	PITT	Joe Capp 3-yard run (Bolkovac kick)	PITT 14–0
3	PITT	Capp 56-yard run (Bolkpvac kick)	PITT 21–0
4	WVU	Alfred Purello 3-yard run ( Gene Simmons kick )	PITT 21–7

On November 4, first-year coach Art Lewis's West Virginia Mountaineers played the Panthers for the forty-third time. Pitt led the series 32–9–1. The Mountaineers had a 2–4 record and were a 13-point underdog.

Due to inclement weather, Pitt relied on its running game and managed to tally three touchdowns to beat the Mountaineers 21–7. The Pitt offense spent the first period in West Virginia territory. They gained possession on the West Virginia 34-yard line. Three running plays advanced the ball to the 3-yard line. On first down, Bill Reynolds fumbled and the Mountaineers recovered. The Panthers forced a punt and regained possession on the Mountaineers 17-yard line. On first down, Bob Bestwick tossed a touchdown pass to Reynolds. Nick Bolkovac added the placement. Later in the period, Reynolds intercepted a West Virginia pass and raced to the Mountaineers 21-yard line. On the second play of the drive, Joe Capp scored from the 6-yard line. Bolkovac made the extra point and Pitt led 14–0 at halftime. The West Virginia offense did not get into Pitt territory until the middle of the third quarter. The Pitt defense stopped their drive on the 27-yard line. On first down Jim Campbell gained 17 yards, then Joe Capp ran 56 yards for a touchdown. Bolkovac's attempt was good and Pitt led 21–0. The Mountaineers engineered a late game drive of 68 yards. Al Purello capped the drive with a 10-yard run and Gene Simmons kicked the point after. The Panthers first (and only) win of the season was witnessed by only 6,125 rain-soaked fans.

=== at Notre Dame ===
Week 7: Pitt at Notre Dame

Team	1	2	3	4	Total
Pitt	0	0	7	0	7
• Notre Dame	6	6	0	6	18

- Date: November 11, 1950
- Location: Notre Dame Stadium
  South Bend, IN
- Game start: 1:30 p. m.
- Game attendance: 56,966
- Game weather: cold with flurries
- Referee: Russell Rupp (Lebanon Valley)

Scoring summary
1	ND	Jim Mutscheller 15-yard pass from Bob Williams (kick missed)	ND 6–0
2	ND	John Petitbon 12-yard pass from Bob Williams ( kick missed)	ND 12–0
3	PITT	Nick DeRosa 15-pass from Bob Bestwick (Nick Bolkovac kick)	ND 12–7
4	ND	Jack Landry 2-yard run (kick missed)	ND 18–7

On November 11, the Panthers played their final road game against Notre Dame in South Bend, IN. Coach Frank Leahy's Irish, defending National Champions, were 3–3 for the season. Quarterback Bobby Williams and center Jerry Groom received All-American recognition. Notre Dame led the all-time series 11–5–1, and had out-scored the Panthers 251–15 on their current 6-game winning streak.

The Panthers lost their seventh straight game to the Irish 18–7. Notre Dame quarterback Bob Williams threw two touchdown passes in the first half to give the Irish a 12–0 halftime edge. In the third quarter, Bob Bestwick connected with Nick DeRosa for a 15-yard touchdown pass to cut the lead to 12–7. Bestwick completed 19 of 24 passes for 252 yards, 16 of 18 in the second half. His first pass of the game was a touchdown toss that was negated due to a penalty. Notre Dame sealed the victory with an 81-yard touchdown drive in the final period. Jack Landry scored on a 1-yard plunge.

The Pitt starting lineup for the game against Notre Dame was Chris Warriner (left end), Flint Greene (left tackle), Charles Thomas (left guard), John Dazio (center), Merle DeLuca (right guard), Ted Geremsky (right tackle), Nick DeRosa (right end), Bob Bestwick (quarterback), David Fyock (left halfback), James Campbell (right halfback) and Joe Capp (fullback). Substitutes appearing in the game for Pitt were George Glagola, Joseph Bozek, John Masarik, Nick Bolkovac, Bill Gasparovic, Rudy Andabaker, Mike Boldin, Dan Karanovich, George Radosevich, Gabe Gamborosky, Bob Osterhout, Bill Sichko, Frank Guadagnino, James Jennings and Joseph Schmidt.

=== Michigan State ===
Week 8: Michigan State at Pitt

Team	1	2	3	4	Total
• Michigan State	0	13	6	0	19
Pitt	0	0	0	0	0

- Date: November 18, 1950
- Location: Pitt Stadium
  Pittsburgh, PA
- Game start: 2:00 p.m.
- Game attendance: 28,679
- Game weather: cloudy and mild
- Referee: George W. Rennix (Minnesota)

Scoring summary
2	MSU	Hank Minarik 23-yard pass from Al Dorow (kick missed)	MSU 6–0
2	MSU	Dick Panin 12-yard run ( Bob Carey kick)	MSU 13–0
3	MSU	Bob Carey 25-yard pass from Al Dorow (kick missed)	MSU 19–0

On November 18, the Panthers played Michigan State for the second time. In 1945, the Spartans came to Pittsburgh and beat the Panthers 12–7. This time the Spartans were the newest member of the Western Conference. Coach Biggie Munn's squad was 7–1 on the season and ranked #10 by the Associated Press. State ends Dorne Dibble and Bob Carey, and fullback Sonny Grandelius received All-American honors.

Coach Casanova had to adjust his backfield line-up. Halfback Bill Sichko injured his ribs, while halfback Bill Reynolds and fullback Joe Capp hurt their shoulders in the Notre Dame game. Dave Fyock and Jim Campbell started at halfback. Future college and pro football Hall-of-Famer Joe Schmidt started at fullback.

The Michigan State defense rendered the Panthers offense inept, as they beat the Panthers 19–0. Pitt earned 6 first downs to State's 18, and ended the game with minus 11 total yards. Michigan State gained 333 total yards and would have scored more, but they fumbled 7 times and lost 4 of them. State quarterback Al Dorow threw 2 touchdown passes. In the second quarter, he connected with end Henry Minarik for a 23-yard touchdown. At the end of the first half, fullback Dick Panin scored from the 12-yard line. In the third quarter, Bob Carey caught a 23-yard pass for the final score. Carey made 1 of 3 extra points.

The Pitt starting lineup for the game against Michigan State was Chris Warriner (left end), Nick Bolkovac (left tackle), Charles Thomas (left guard), John Dazio (center), Merle DeLuca (right guard), Ted Geremsky (right tackle), Nick DeRosa (right end), Bob Bestwick (quarterback), David Fyock (left halfback), James Campbell (right halfback) and Joe Schmidt (fullback). Substitutes appearing in the game for Pitt were George Glagola, Joseph Bozek, John Masarik, Bob Brennen, Rudy Andabaker, Mike Boldin, Dan Karanovich, Anthony Romantino, George Radosevich, Gabe Gamborosky, Bob Osterhout, Bill Sichko, Frank Guadagnino, James Jennings, Bill Reynolds, Joe Kurtik and William Ewing.

=== Penn State ===
Week 9: Penn State at Pitt

Team	1	2	3	4	Total
• Penn State	14	7	0	0	21
Pitt	0	7	7	6	20

- Date: December 2, 1950
- Location: Pitt Stadium
  Pittsburgh, PA
- Game start: 1:30 p.m.
- Game attendance: 7,000–12,250
- Game weather: cold and muddy
- Referee: John Coles (Westminster)

Scoring summary
1	PSU	Bill Leonard 60-yard pass interception (Vince O'Bara kick)	PSU 7–0
1	PSU	Paul Anders 5-yard run (O'Bara kick)	PSU 14–0
2	PSU	Paul Anders 12-yard run ( O'Bara kick)	PSU 21–0
2	PITT	Chris Warriner 25-yard pass from Bob Bestwick (Nick Bolkovac kick)	PSU 21–7
3	PITT	James Campbell 1-yard run (Nick Bolkovac kick)	PSU 21–14
4	PITT	Nick DeRosa 14-yard pass from Bob Bestwick (kick missed)	PSU 21–20

The final game of the 1950 season had been scheduled for November 25. Twenty-three inches of snow brought the city to a standstill and caused the game to be postponed twice. The game was finally played on a muddy Forbes Field the following Saturday, December 2. The start time was changed to 1:30. The mayor banned automobile parking in the Oakland section of Pittsburgh, so the trolley-car was the main means of access to the stadium.

Penn State, led by first-year coach Rip Engle, was 4–3–1. The Panthers led the all-time series 29–18–2. Pitt lost to the Lions 21–20, and ended their season with a 1–8 record. Early in the game, Pitt recovered a Penn State fumble on the Lion 28-yard line. On the third play, Lion back Bill Leonard intercepted Bob Bestwick's pass and ran 60 yards for the touchdown. Vince O'Bara booted the extra point. After an exchange of punts the Lions had control on the Panthers 30-yard line. Paul Anders scored from the five and O'Bara's placement made it 14–0 Penn State. At the start of the second period, the Lions missed a 21-yard field goal. The Panthers fumbled and State recovered on the Panthers 20-yard line. On second down Anders ran the final 12 yards for the score. O'Bara's kick made it 21–0. The Panther offense managed a 75-yard touchdown drive prior to halftime to cut the lead to 21–7. Bestwick connected with Chris Warriner for a 24-yard touchdown pass. Nick Bolkovac converted on his third attempt, after two offsides calls on the Lions. The Panthers drove 97-yards in the third quarter. Jim Campbell ran through the middle from the 1-yard line and Bolkovac's extra point narrowed the lead to 21–14. In the final quarter, Pitt back Bill Reynolds returned a punt to the State 14-yard line. A penalty moved the ball back to the 25-yard line. On second down, Bestwick threw to Nick DeRosa in the corner of the end zone to mmake the score 21–20. Bolkovac's placement was good but the Panthers had 12 men on the field. Bolkovac shanked his next attempt to seal the loss. That was his only miss of the season.

The Pitt starting lineup for the game against Penn State was Chris Warriner (left end), Nick Bolkovac (left tackle), Rudy Andabaker (left guard), John Dazio (center), Dan Karanovich (right guard), Bill Gasparovic (right tackle), Nick DeRosa (right end), Bob Bestwick (quarterback), Bill Sichko (left halfback), Bill Reynolds (right halfback) and Joe Capp (fullback). Substitutes appearing in the game for Pitt were Ted Geremsky, Joseph Bozek, Flint Greene, Bob Brennen, Merle DeLuca, Mike Boldin, Anthony Romantino, George Radosevich, Gabe Gamborosky, Joe Schmidt, James Campbell and Armand DiFonso.

== Individual scoring summary ==
1950 Pittsburgh Panthers scoring summary
Player	Touchdowns	Extra points	Field goals	Safety	Points
Nick DeRosa	3	0	0	0	18
Nick Bolkovac	0	13	0	0	13
Chris Warriner	2	0	0	0	12
Joseph Capp	2	0	0	0	12
George Glagola	1	0	0	1	8
William Sichko	1	0	0	0	6
Armand DiFonso	1	0	0	0	6
Robert Bestwick	1	0	0	0	6
James Campbell	1	0	0	0	6
Robert Osterhout	1	0	0	0	6
William Reynolds	1	0	0	0	6
Totals	14	13	0	1	99

== Postseason ==
Tackle Nick Bolkovac was selected to play in the East – West Shrine Game in San Francisco. The game was played on December 30.

== Team players drafted into the NFL ==
The following players were selected in the 1951 NFL draft.

Player	Position	Round	Pick	NFL club
Ted Geremsky	end	16	189	Detroit Lions
Nick Bolkovac	tackle	30	354	Washington Redskins
