= 1950 Syracuse Orangemen football team =

American college football season

1950 Syracuse Orangemen football
- Conference: Independent
- Record: 5–5
- Head coach: Ben Schwartzwalder (2nd season)
- Captain: Game captains
- Home stadium: Archbold Stadium

1950 Eastern college football independents records
| | Conf. | | | Overall |
| Team | W | L | T | W | | L | | T |
|---|---|---|---|---|---|---|---|---|
| Franklin & Marshall | | – | | 9 | – | 0 | – | 0 |
| No. 6 Princeton | | – | | 9 | – | 0 | – | 0 |
| St. Lawrence | | – | | 8 | – | 0 | – | 0 |
| Thiel | | – | | 7 | – | 0 | – | 0 |
| No. 2 Army | | – | | 8 | – | 1 | – | 0 |
| Fordham | | – | | 8 | – | 1 | – | 0 |
| Carnegie Tech | | – | | 7 | – | 1 | – | 0 |
| Drexel | | – | | 6 | – | 1 | – | 0 |
| Cornell | | – | | 7 | – | 2 | – | 0 |
| Gannon | | – | | 6 | – | 2 | – | 0 |
| Bucknell | | – | | 6 | – | 3 | – | 0 |
| Penn | | – | | 6 | – | 3 | – | 0 |
| Yale | | – | | 6 | – | 3 | – | 0 |
| Buffalo | | – | | 5 | – | 3 | – | 0 |
| Colgate | | – | | 5 | – | 3 | – | 0 |
| Penn State | | – | | 5 | – | 3 | – | 1 |
| Syracuse | | – | | 5 | – | 5 | – | 0 |
| Temple | | – | | 4 | – | 4 | – | 1 |
| Tufts | | – | | 4 | – | 4 | – | 1 |
| Columbia | | – | | 4 | – | 5 | – | 0 |
| Villanova | | – | | 4 | – | 5 | – | 0 |
| Holy Cross | | – | | 4 | – | 5 | – | 1 |
| Dartmouth | | – | | 3 | – | 5 | – | 1 |
| Boston University | | – | | 3 | – | 5 | – | 0 |
| Duquesne | | – | | 2 | – | 6 | – | 1 |
| Hofstra | | – | | 2 | – | 6 | – | 0 |
| NYU | | – | | 1 | – | 5 | – | 1 |
| CCNY | | – | | 1 | – | 7 | – | 0 |
| Harvard | | – | | 1 | – | 7 | – | 0 |
| Brown | | – | | 1 | – | 8 | – | 0 |
| Pittsburgh | | – | | 1 | – | 8 | – | 0 |
| Boston College | | – | | 0 | – | 9 | – | 1 |
Rankings from AP Poll

The 1950 Syracuse Orangemen football team represented Syracuse University as an independent during the 1950 college football season. The Orangemen, led by second-year head coach Ben Schwartzwalder, played their home games at Archbold Stadium in Syracuse, New York. Syracuse finished the season with a 5–5 record and were not invited to a bowl game.

== Schedule ==
| Date | Time | Opponent | Site | Result | Attendance | Source |
|---|---|---|---|---|---|---|
| September 23 | | Rutgers | Archbold Stadium; Syracuse, NY | W 42–12 | 16,481 | |
| September 29 | | at Temple | Temple Stadium; Philadelphia, PA | L 6–7 | 12,000 | |
| October 7 | | No. 16 Cornell | Archbold Stadium; Syracuse, NY | L 7–26 | 30,000 | |
| October 14 | | Penn State | Archbold Stadium; Syracuse, NY (rivalry) | W 27–7 | 17,500 | |
| October 21 | | at Holy Cross | Fitton Field; Worcester, MA | W 34–27 | 18,000 | |
| October 28 | 1:30 p.m. | at Boston University | Fenway Park; Boston, MA | W 13–7 | 8,591 | |
| November 4 | | at Lafayette | Fisher Field; Easton, PA | W 34–0 | 8,000 | |
| November 10 | | at John Carroll | Cleveland Stadium; Cleveland, OH | L 16–21 | 16,724 | |
| November 18 | | Colgate | Archbold Stadium; Syracuse, NY (rivalry) | L 14–19 | 38,000 | |
| December 2 | | at Fordham | Polo Grounds; New York, NY | L 6–13 | 13,832 | |
Rankings from AP Poll released prior to the game
