= 1950 Penn State Nittany Lions football team =

American college football season

1950 Penn State Nittany Lions football
- Conference: Independent
- Record: 5–3–1
- Head coach: Rip Engle (1st season)
- Captain: Owen Dougherty
- Home stadium: New Beaver Field

1950 Eastern college football independents records
	Conf.			Overall
Team	W	L	T	W		L		T
Franklin & Marshall		–		9	–	0	–	0
No. 6 Princeton		–		9	–	0	–	0
St. Lawrence		–		8	–	0	–	0
Thiel		–		7	–	0	–	0
No. 2 Army		–		8	–	1	–	0
Fordham		–		8	–	1	–	0
Carnegie Tech		–		7	–	1	–	0
Drexel		–		6	–	1	–	0
Cornell		–		7	–	2	–	0
Gannon		–		6	–	2	–	0
Bucknell		–		6	–	3	–	0
Penn		–		6	–	3	–	0
Yale		–		6	–	3	–	0
Buffalo		–		5	–	3	–	0
Colgate		–		5	–	3	–	0
Penn State		–		5	–	3	–	1
Syracuse		–		5	–	5	–	0
Temple		–		4	–	4	–	1
Tufts		–		4	–	4	–	1
Columbia		–		4	–	5	–	0
Villanova		–		4	–	5	–	0
Holy Cross		–		4	–	5	–	1
Dartmouth		–		3	–	5	–	1
Boston University		–		3	–	5	–	0
Duquesne		–		2	–	6	–	1
Hofstra		–		2	–	6	–	0
NYU		–		1	–	5	–	1
CCNY		–		1	–	7	–	0
Harvard		–		1	–	7	–	0
Brown		–		1	–	8	–	0
Pittsburgh		–		1	–	8	–	0
Boston College		–		0	–	9	–	1
Rankings from AP Poll

The 1950 Penn State Nittany Lions football team represented the Pennsylvania State University as an independent during the 1950 college football season. The team was coached by Rip Engle and played its home games in New Beaver Field in State College, Pennsylvania.

== Schedule ==
Date	Opponent	Site	Result	Attendance	Source
September 30	Georgetown	New Beaver Field; State College, PA	W 34–14	16,617	
October 7	at No. 4 Army	Michie Stadium; West Point, NY	L 7–41	26,562	
October 14	at Syracuse	Archbold Stadium; Syracuse, NY (rivalry)	L 7–27	17,500	
October 21	at Nebraska	Memorial Stadium; Lincoln, NE	L 0–19	38,000	
October 28	Temple^{†}	New Beaver Field; State College, PA	T 7–7	20,428–20,782	
November 4	at Boston College	Braves Field; Boston, MA	W 20–13	8,503	
November 11	West Virginia	New Beaver Field; State College, PA (rivalry)	W 27–0	16,338	
November 18	Rutgers	New Beaver Field; State College, PA	W 18–14	15,299	
December 2	at Pittsburgh	Forbes Field; Pittsburgh, PA (rivalry)	W 21–20	7,000–12,250	
^{†}Homecoming; Rankings from AP Poll released prior to the game
