= 1950 Fordham Rams football team =

American college football season

1950 Fordham Rams football
- Conference: Independent
- Record: 8–1
- Head coach: Ed Danowski (5th season)
- Home stadium: Polo Grounds

1950 Eastern college football independents records
	Conf.			Overall
Team	W	L	T	W		L		T
Franklin & Marshall		–		9	–	0	–	0
No. 6 Princeton		–		9	–	0	–	0
St. Lawrence		–		8	–	0	–	0
Thiel		–		7	–	0	–	0
No. 2 Army		–		8	–	1	–	0
Fordham		–		8	–	1	–	0
Carnegie Tech		–		7	–	1	–	0
Drexel		–		6	–	1	–	0
Cornell		–		7	–	2	–	0
Gannon		–		6	–	2	–	0
Bucknell		–		6	–	3	–	0
Penn		–		6	–	3	–	0
Yale		–		6	–	3	–	0
Buffalo		–		5	–	3	–	0
Colgate		–		5	–	3	–	0
Penn State		–		5	–	3	–	1
Syracuse		–		5	–	5	–	0
Temple		–		4	–	4	–	1
Tufts		–		4	–	4	–	1
Columbia		–		4	–	5	–	0
Villanova		–		4	–	5	–	0
Holy Cross		–		4	–	5	–	1
Dartmouth		–		3	–	5	–	1
Boston University		–		3	–	5	–	0
Duquesne		–		2	–	6	–	1
Hofstra		–		2	–	6	–	0
NYU		–		1	–	5	–	1
CCNY		–		1	–	7	–	0
Harvard		–		1	–	7	–	0
Brown		–		1	–	8	–	0
Pittsburgh		–		1	–	8	–	0
Boston College		–		0	–	9	–	1
Rankings from AP Poll

The 1950 Fordham Rams football team represented Fordham University as an independent during the 1950 college football season. The Rams went 8–1 and scored 174 points while their defense allowed 123 points. Despite an 8–1 record, Fordham finished the season unranked and were left out of any postseason play, although they did get strong consideration from the Gator Bowl. Ultimately, a poor strength of schedule—Fordham's opponents combined for a dismal 28–53–4 mark–in what was a weak year for the entire Eastern region and a belief that Fordham would not travel well—Fordham only averaged about 10,000 fans per home game—kept them home during bowl season. Still, their .889 win percentage (the 1937 team had a .933 win percentage while going 7–0–1) is tied for second best in school history.

== Schedule ==
Date	Opponent	Site	Result	Attendance	Source
September 23	at Lafayette	Fisher Stadium; Easton, PA	W 20–19	12,000	
October 7	at Yale	Yale Bowl; New Haven, CT	L 14–21	35,000	
October 13	at Boston College	Braves Field; Boston, MA	W 26–6	10,884	
October 21	at West Virginia	Mountaineer Field; Morgantown, WV	W 27–23	18,000	
October 28	San Francisco	Polo Grounds; New York, NY	W 21–14	11,000	
November 11	Georgetown	Polo Grounds; New York, NY	W 14–13	13,130	
November 18	at Temple	Temple Stadium; Philadelphia, PA	W 26–21	7,000	
November 25	vs. NYU	Polo Grounds; New York, NY	W 13–0	1,500	
December 2	Syracuse	Polo Grounds; New York, NY	W 13–6	13,282	
