= 1950 Columbia Lions football team =

American college football season

1950 Columbia Lions football
- Conference: Independent
- Record: 4–5
- Head coach: Lou Little (21st season)
- Captain: Albert Nork
- Home stadium: Baker Field

1950 Eastern college football independents records
	Conf.			Overall
Team	W	L	T	W		L		T
Franklin & Marshall		–		9	–	0	–	0
No. 6 Princeton		–		9	–	0	–	0
St. Lawrence		–		8	–	0	–	0
Thiel		–		7	–	0	–	0
No. 2 Army		–		8	–	1	–	0
Fordham		–		8	–	1	–	0
Carnegie Tech		–		7	–	1	–	0
Drexel		–		6	–	1	–	0
Cornell		–		7	–	2	–	0
Gannon		–		6	–	2	–	0
Bucknell		–		6	–	3	–	0
Penn		–		6	–	3	–	0
Yale		–		6	–	3	–	0
Buffalo		–		5	–	3	–	0
Colgate		–		5	–	3	–	0
Penn State		–		5	–	3	–	1
Syracuse		–		5	–	5	–	0
Temple		–		4	–	4	–	1
Tufts		–		4	–	4	–	1
Columbia		–		4	–	5	–	0
Villanova		–		4	–	5	–	0
Holy Cross		–		4	–	5	–	1
Dartmouth		–		3	–	5	–	1
Boston University		–		3	–	5	–	0
Duquesne		–		2	–	6	–	1
Hofstra		–		2	–	6	–	0
NYU		–		1	–	5	–	1
CCNY		–		1	–	7	–	0
Harvard		–		1	–	7	–	0
Brown		–		1	–	8	–	0
Pittsburgh		–		1	–	8	–	0
Boston College		–		0	–	9	–	1
Rankings from AP Poll

The 1950 Columbia Lions football team was an American football team that represented Columbia University as an independent during the 1950 college football season.

In their 21st season under head coach Lou Little, the Lions compiled a 4–5 record, and were outscored 169 to 151. Albert Nork was the team captain.

Columbia played its home games at Baker Field in Upper Manhattan, in New York City.

== Schedule ==
Date	Opponent	Site	Result	Attendance	Source
September 30	Hobart	Baker Field; New York, NY	W 42–12	8,000	
October 7	at Harvard	Harvard Stadium; Boston, MA	W 28–7	15,000	
October 14	at Yale	Yale Bowl; New Haven, CT	L 14–20	30,000	
October 21	Penn^{†}	Baker Field; New York, NY	L 0–34	30,000	
October 28	No. 2 Army	Baker Field; New York, NY	L 0–34	30,000	
November 4	Cornell	Baker Field; New York, NY (rivalry)	W 20–19	20,000	
November 11	at Dartmouth	Memorial Field; Hanover, NH	L 7–14	14,000	
November 18	Navy	Baker Field; New York, NY	L 7–29	30,000	
November 23	at Brown	Brown Stadium; Providence, RI	W 33–0	8,000	
^{†}Homecoming; Rankings from AP Poll released prior to the game
