= 1950 Colgate Red Raiders football team =

American college football season

1950 Colgate Red Raiders football
- Conference: Independent
- Record: 5–3
- Head coach: Paul Bixler (4th season)
- Captain: Alan Egler
- Home stadium: Colgate Athletic Field

1950 Eastern college football independents records
	Conf.			Overall
Team	W	L	T	W		L		T
Franklin & Marshall		–		9	–	0	–	0
No. 6 Princeton		–		9	–	0	–	0
St. Lawrence		–		8	–	0	–	0
Thiel		–		7	–	0	–	0
No. 2 Army		–		8	–	1	–	0
Fordham		–		8	–	1	–	0
Carnegie Tech		–		7	–	1	–	0
Drexel		–		6	–	1	–	0
Cornell		–		7	–	2	–	0
Gannon		–		6	–	2	–	0
Bucknell		–		6	–	3	–	0
Penn		–		6	–	3	–	0
Yale		–		6	–	3	–	0
Buffalo		–		5	–	3	–	0
Colgate		–		5	–	3	–	0
Penn State		–		5	–	3	–	1
Syracuse		–		5	–	5	–	0
Temple		–		4	–	4	–	1
Tufts		–		4	–	4	–	1
Columbia		–		4	–	5	–	0
Villanova		–		4	–	5	–	0
Holy Cross		–		4	–	5	–	1
Dartmouth		–		3	–	5	–	1
Boston University		–		3	–	5	–	0
Duquesne		–		2	–	6	–	1
Hofstra		–		2	–	6	–	0
NYU		–		1	–	5	–	1
CCNY		–		1	–	7	–	0
Harvard		–		1	–	7	–	0
Brown		–		1	–	8	–	0
Pittsburgh		–		1	–	8	–	0
Boston College		–		0	–	9	–	1
Rankings from AP Poll

The 1950 Colgate Red Raiders football team was an American football team that represented Colgate University as an independent during the 1950 college football season. In its fourth season under head coach Paul Bixler, the team compiled a 5–3 record and was outscored by a total of 193 to 184. Alan Egler was the team captain. The team played its home games at Colgate Athletic Field in Hamilton, New York.

== Schedule ==
Date	Opponent	Site	Result	Attendance	Source
September 30	at No. 2 Army	Michie Stadium; West Point, NY	L 0–28	19,000	
October 7	Western Reserve	Colgate Athletic Field; Hamilton, NY	W 47–6	4,000	
October 14	Holy Cross	Colgate Athletic Field; Hamilton, NY	W 35–28	7,000	
October 21	Bucknell	Colgate Athletic Field; Hamilton, NY	W 23–12	5,500	
October 28	at Brown	Brown Stadium; Providence, RI	W 35–34	6,000	
November 4	at No. 9 Princeton	Palmer Stadium; Princeton, NJ	L 7–45	19,000	
November 11	at Cornell	Schoellkopf Field; Ithaca, NY (rivalry)	L 18–26	19,000	
November 18	at Syracuse	Archbold Stadium; Syracuse, NY (rivalry)	W 19–14	38,000	
Rankings from AP Poll released prior to the game
