= 1950 Penn Quakers football team =

American college football season

1950 Penn Quakers football
- Conference: Independent
- Record: 6–3
- Head coach: George Munger (13th season)
- Home stadium: Franklin Field

1950 Eastern college football independents records
	Conf.			Overall
Team	W	L	T	W		L		T
Franklin & Marshall		–		9	–	0	–	0
No. 6 Princeton		–		9	–	0	–	0
St. Lawrence		–		8	–	0	–	0
Thiel		–		7	–	0	–	0
No. 2 Army		–		8	–	1	–	0
Fordham		–		8	–	1	–	0
Carnegie Tech		–		7	–	1	–	0
Drexel		–		6	–	1	–	0
Cornell		–		7	–	2	–	0
Gannon		–		6	–	2	–	0
Bucknell		–		6	–	3	–	0
Penn		–		6	–	3	–	0
Yale		–		6	–	3	–	0
Buffalo		–		5	–	3	–	0
Colgate		–		5	–	3	–	0
Penn State		–		5	–	3	–	1
Syracuse		–		5	–	5	–	0
Temple		–		4	–	4	–	1
Tufts		–		4	–	4	–	1
Columbia		–		4	–	5	–	0
Villanova		–		4	–	5	–	0
Holy Cross		–		4	–	5	–	1
Dartmouth		–		3	–	5	–	1
Boston University		–		3	–	5	–	0
Duquesne		–		2	–	6	–	1
Hofstra		–		2	–	6	–	0
NYU		–		1	–	5	–	1
CCNY		–		1	–	7	–	0
Harvard		–		1	–	7	–	0
Brown		–		1	–	8	–	0
Pittsburgh		–		1	–	8	–	0
Boston College		–		0	–	9	–	1
Rankings from AP Poll

The 1950 Penn Quakers football team was an American football team that represented the University of Pennsylvania as an independent during the 1950 college football season. In its 13th season under head coach George Munger, the team compiled a 6–3 record and outscored opponents by a total of 223 to 95. The team played its home games at Franklin Field in Philadelphia.

== Schedule ==
Date	Opponent	Rank	Site	Result	Attendance	Source
September 30	Virginia		Franklin Field; Philadelphia, PA	W 21–7	40,000	
October 7	at No. 9 California	No. 20	California Memorial Stadium; Berkeley, CA	L 7–14	64,000	
October 14	Dartmouth		Franklin Field; Philadelphia, PA	W 42–26	38,000	
October 21	at Columbia		Baker Field; New York, NY	W 34–0	30,000	
October 28	Navy		Franklin Field; Philadelphia, PA	W 30–7	60,000	
November 4	No. 2 Army	No. 15	Franklin Field; Philadelphia, PA	L 13–28	78,000	
November 11	Brown		Franklin Field; Philadelphia, PA	W 50–0	45,000	
November 18	No. 15 Wisconsin	No. 20	Franklin Field; Philadelphia, PA	W 20–0	60,000	
November 25	Cornell	No. 13	Franklin Field; Philadelphia, PA (rivalry)	L 6–13	17,846	
Rankings from AP Poll released prior to the game
