= 1950 Bucknell Bison football team =

American college football season

1950 Bucknell Bison football
- Conference: Independent
- Record: 6–3
- Head coach: Harry Lawrence (4th season)
- Captains: Richard D. Johnson; Arnold V. Pechulis
- Home stadium: Memorial Stadium

1950 Eastern college football independents records
	Conf.			Overall
Team	W	L	T	W		L		T
Franklin & Marshall		–		9	–	0	–	0
No. 6 Princeton		–		9	–	0	–	0
St. Lawrence		–		8	–	0	–	0
Thiel		–		7	–	0	–	0
No. 2 Army		–		8	–	1	–	0
Fordham		–		8	–	1	–	0
Carnegie Tech		–		7	–	1	–	0
Drexel		–		6	–	1	–	0
Cornell		–		7	–	2	–	0
Gannon		–		6	–	2	–	0
Bucknell		–		6	–	3	–	0
Penn		–		6	–	3	–	0
Yale		–		6	–	3	–	0
Buffalo		–		5	–	3	–	0
Colgate		–		5	–	3	–	0
Penn State		–		5	–	3	–	1
Syracuse		–		5	–	5	–	0
Temple		–		4	–	4	–	1
Tufts		–		4	–	4	–	1
Columbia		–		4	–	5	–	0
Villanova		–		4	–	5	–	0
Holy Cross		–		4	–	5	–	1
Dartmouth		–		3	–	5	–	1
Boston University		–		3	–	5	–	0
Duquesne		–		2	–	6	–	1
Hofstra		–		2	–	6	–	0
NYU		–		1	–	5	–	1
CCNY		–		1	–	7	–	0
Harvard		–		1	–	7	–	0
Brown		–		1	–	8	–	0
Pittsburgh		–		1	–	8	–	0
Boston College		–		0	–	9	–	1
Rankings from AP Poll

The 1950 Bucknell Bison football team was an American football team that represented Bucknell University as an independent during the 1950 college football season.

In its fourth season under head coach Harry Lawrence, the team compiled a 6–3 record. Richard D. Johnson and Arnold V. Pechulis were the team captains.

The team played its home games at Memorial Stadium on the university campus in Lewisburg, Pennsylvania.

== Schedule ==
Date	Opponent	Site	Result	Attendance	Source
September 23	Gettysburg	Memorial Stadium; Lewisburg, PA	W 20–15	9,000	
September 30	at Muhlenberg	Allentown High School Stadium; Allentown, PA	L 13–18	5,000	
October 7	Lehigh	Memorial Stadium; Lewisburg, PA	L 6–27	5,500	
October 14	at Washington & Jefferson	College Park; Washington, PA	W 34–0	2,000	
October 21	at Colgate	Colgate Athletic Field; Hamilton, NY	L 12–23	5,500	
October 28	Lafayette^{†}	Memorial Stadium; Lewisburg, PA	W 32–0	6,500	
November 4	NYU	Memorial Stadium; Lewisburg, PA	W 41–7	3,000	
November 11	at Temple	Temple Stadium; Philadelphia, PA	W 35–0	7,500	
November 18	at Delaware	Wilmington Park; Wilmington, DE	W 13–0	5,000	
^{†}Homecoming
