= 1950 Cornell Big Red football team =

American college football season

1950 Cornell Big Red football
- Conference: Independent

Ranking
- Coaches: No. T–20
- Record: 7–2
- Head coach: George K. James (4th season)
- Captains: John Pierik; Charles Taylor
- Home stadium: Schoellkopf Field

1950 Eastern college football independents records
	Conf.			Overall
Team	W	L	T	W		L		T
Franklin & Marshall		–		9	–	0	–	0
No. 6 Princeton		–		9	–	0	–	0
St. Lawrence		–		8	–	0	–	0
Thiel		–		7	–	0	–	0
No. 2 Army		–		8	–	1	–	0
Fordham		–		8	–	1	–	0
Carnegie Tech		–		7	–	1	–	0
Drexel		–		6	–	1	–	0
Cornell		–		7	–	2	–	0
Gannon		–		6	–	2	–	0
Bucknell		–		6	–	3	–	0
Penn		–		6	–	3	–	0
Yale		–		6	–	3	–	0
Buffalo		–		5	–	3	–	0
Colgate		–		5	–	3	–	0
Penn State		–		5	–	3	–	1
Syracuse		–		5	–	5	–	0
Temple		–		4	–	4	–	1
Tufts		–		4	–	4	–	1
Columbia		–		4	–	5	–	0
Villanova		–		4	–	5	–	0
Holy Cross		–		4	–	5	–	1
Dartmouth		–		3	–	5	–	1
Boston University		–		3	–	5	–	0
Duquesne		–		2	–	6	–	1
Hofstra		–		2	–	6	–	0
NYU		–		1	–	5	–	1
CCNY		–		1	–	7	–	0
Harvard		–		1	–	7	–	0
Brown		–		1	–	8	–	0
Pittsburgh		–		1	–	8	–	0
Boston College		–		0	–	9	–	1
Rankings from AP Poll

The 1950 Cornell Big Red football team was an American football team that represented Cornell University as an independent during the 1950 college football season. In its fourth season under head coach George K. James, the team compiled a 7–2 record and outscored its opponents 170 to 85. John Pierik and Charles Taylor were the team captains. The team ranked sixth in major college football in total defense, allowing an average of only 198.7 yards per game.

Cornell played its home games at Schoellkopf Field in Ithaca, New York.

== Schedule ==
Date	Opponent	Rank	Site	Result	Attendance	Source
September 30	Lafayette	No. 9	Schoellkopf Field; Ithaca, NY	W 27–0	14,000	
October 7	at Syracuse	No. 16	Archbold Stadium; Syracuse, NY	W 26–7	30,000	
October 14	at Harvard	No. 17	Harvard Stadium; Boston, MA	W 28–7	16,000	
October 21	Yale	No. 17	Schoellkopf Field; Ithaca, NY	W 7–0	32,000	
October 28	at Princeton	No. 10	Palmer Stadium; Princeton, NJ	L 0–27	47,500	
November 4	at Columbia		Baker Field; New York, NY (rivalry)	L 19–20	20,000	
November 11	Colgate		Schoellkopf Field; Ithaca, NY (rivalry)	W 26–18	19,000	
November 18	Dartmouth		Schoellkopf Field; Ithaca, NY (rivalry)	W 24–0	28,000	
November 25	at No. 13 Penn		Franklin Field; Philadelphia, PA (rivalry)	W 13–6	17,846	
Rankings from AP Poll released prior to the game
