= 1950 Yale Bulldogs football team =

American college football season

1950 Yale Bulldogs football
- Conference: Independent
- Record: 6–3
- Head coach: Herman Hickman (3rd season)
- Captain: Bradford H. Quackenbush
- Home stadium: Yale Bowl

1950 Eastern college football independents records
	Conf.			Overall
Team	W	L	T	W		L		T
Franklin & Marshall		–		9	–	0	–	0
No. 6 Princeton		–		9	–	0	–	0
St. Lawrence		–		8	–	0	–	0
Thiel		–		7	–	0	–	0
No. 2 Army		–		8	–	1	–	0
Fordham		–		8	–	1	–	0
Carnegie Tech		–		7	–	1	–	0
Drexel		–		6	–	1	–	0
Cornell		–		7	–	2	–	0
Gannon		–		6	–	2	–	0
Bucknell		–		6	–	3	–	0
Penn		–		6	–	3	–	0
Yale		–		6	–	3	–	0
Buffalo		–		5	–	3	–	0
Colgate		–		5	–	3	–	0
Penn State		–		5	–	3	–	1
Syracuse		–		5	–	5	–	0
Temple		–		4	–	4	–	1
Tufts		–		4	–	4	–	1
Columbia		–		4	–	5	–	0
Villanova		–		4	–	5	–	0
Holy Cross		–		4	–	5	–	1
Dartmouth		–		3	–	5	–	1
Boston University		–		3	–	5	–	0
Duquesne		–		2	–	6	–	1
Hofstra		–		2	–	6	–	0
NYU		–		1	–	5	–	1
CCNY		–		1	–	7	–	0
Harvard		–		1	–	7	–	0
Brown		–		1	–	8	–	0
Pittsburgh		–		1	–	8	–	0
Boston College		–		0	–	9	–	1
Rankings from AP Poll

The 1950 Yale Bulldogs football team represented Yale University in the 1950 college football season. The Bulldogs were led by third-year head coach Herman Hickman, played their home games at the Yale Bowl and finished the season with a 6–3 record.

== Schedule ==
Date	Opponent	Site	Result	Attendance	Source
September 23	Connecticut	Yale Bowl; New Haven, CT	W 25–0	24,000	
September 30	Brown	Yale Bowl; New Haven, CT	W 36–12	35,000	
October 7	Fordham	Yale Bowl; New Haven, CT	W 21–14	35,000	
October 14	Columbia	Yale Bowl; New Haven, CT	W 20–14	30,000	
October 15	at No. 17 Cornell	Schoellkopf Field; Ithaca, NY	L 0–7	32,000	
October 28	Holy Cross	Yale Bowl; New Haven, CT	W 14–13	30,000	
November 4	Dartmouth	Yale Bowl; New Haven, CT	L 0–7	35,000	
November 18	No. 7 Princeton	Yale Bowl; New Haven, CT (rivalry)	L 12–47	59,000	
November 25	at Harvard	Harvard Stadium; Boston, MA (The Game)	W 14–6	40,000	
Rankings from AP Poll released prior to the game
