= 1950 Army Cadets football team =

American college football season

1950 Army Cadets football
- Conference: Independent

Ranking
- Coaches: No. 5
- AP: No. 2
- Record: 8–1
- Head coach: Earl Blaik (10th season)
- Captain: Dan Foldberg
- Home stadium: Michie Stadium

1950 Eastern college football independents records
	Conf.			Overall
Team	W	L	T	W		L		T
Franklin & Marshall		–		9	–	0	–	0
No. 6 Princeton		–		9	–	0	–	0
St. Lawrence		–		8	–	0	–	0
Thiel		–		7	–	0	–	0
No. 2 Army		–		8	–	1	–	0
Fordham		–		8	–	1	–	0
Carnegie Tech		–		7	–	1	–	0
Drexel		–		6	–	1	–	0
Cornell		–		7	–	2	–	0
Gannon		–		6	–	2	–	0
Bucknell		–		6	–	3	–	0
Penn		–		6	–	3	–	0
Yale		–		6	–	3	–	0
Buffalo		–		5	–	3	–	0
Colgate		–		5	–	3	–	0
Penn State		–		5	–	3	–	1
Syracuse		–		5	–	5	–	0
Temple		–		4	–	4	–	1
Tufts		–		4	–	4	–	1
Columbia		–		4	–	5	–	0
Villanova		–		4	–	5	–	0
Holy Cross		–		4	–	5	–	1
Dartmouth		–		3	–	5	–	1
Boston University		–		3	–	5	–	0
Duquesne		–		2	–	6	–	1
Hofstra		–		2	–	6	–	0
NYU		–		1	–	5	–	1
CCNY		–		1	–	7	–	0
Harvard		–		1	–	7	–	0
Brown		–		1	–	8	–	0
Pittsburgh		–		1	–	8	–	0
Boston College		–		0	–	9	–	1
Rankings from AP Poll

The 1950 Army Cadets football team represented the United States Military Academy as an independent during the 1950 college football season. Led by head coach Earl Blaik, the team finished with an 8–1 record. The Cadets offense scored 267 points, while the defense allowed 40 points. Bob Blaik was the starting quarterback.

Tom Lombardo, the captain of the 1944 Army team, was killed in action in Korea. Two weeks before the Army–Navy Game, Johnny Trent, the captain of the 1949 Army team, was killed in action. Trent, and Arnold Galiffa, the starting quarterback of the 1949 Army team, were sent with the Eighth Army to Korea. With President Harry S. Truman in attendance, Navy beat Army by a score of 14–2. It was the first time Navy had beaten Army since 1943.

== Schedule ==
Date	Opponent	Rank	Site	TV	Result	Attendance	Source
September 30	Colgate	No. 2	Michie Stadium; West Point, NY	CBS	W 28–0	19,000	
October 7	Penn State	No. 4	Michie Stadium; West Point, NY	CBS	W 41–7	26,562	
October 14	vs. No. 18 Michigan	No. 1	Yankee Stadium; Bronx, NY	CBS	W 27–6	61,472	
October 21	at Harvard	No. 1	Harvard Stadium; Boston, MA	NBC	W 49–0	26,000	
October 28	at Columbia	No. 2	Baker Field; New York, NY	CBS	W 34–0	30,000	
November 4	at No. 15 Penn	No. 2	Franklin Field; Philadelphia, PA	ABC	W 28–13	78,000	
November 11	New Mexico	No. 1	Michie Stadium; West Point, NY		W 51–0	30,476	
November 18	at Stanford	No. 3	Stanford Stadium; Stanford, CA		W 7–0	40,000	
December 2	vs. Navy	No. 2	Philadelphia Municipal Stadium; Philadelphia, PA (Army–Navy Game)	CBS	L 2–14	103,000	
Rankings from AP Poll released prior to the game

== 1951 NFL draft ==
Player	Position	Round	Pick	NFL club
Al Pollard	Back	21	251	New York Yanks
Dan Foldberg	End	22	261	Detroit Lions
