= 1950 Holy Cross Crusaders football team =

American college football season

1950 Holy Cross Crusaders football
- Conference: Independent
- Record: 4–5–1
- Head coach: Eddie Anderson (7th season)
- Home stadium: Fitton Field

1950 Eastern college football independents records
	Conf.			Overall
Team	W	L	T	W		L		T
Franklin & Marshall		–		9	–	0	–	0
No. 6 Princeton		–		9	–	0	–	0
St. Lawrence		–		8	–	0	–	0
Thiel		–		7	–	0	–	0
No. 2 Army		–		8	–	1	–	0
Fordham		–		8	–	1	–	0
Carnegie Tech		–		7	–	1	–	0
Drexel		–		6	–	1	–	0
Cornell		–		7	–	2	–	0
Gannon		–		6	–	2	–	0
Bucknell		–		6	–	3	–	0
Penn		–		6	–	3	–	0
Yale		–		6	–	3	–	0
Buffalo		–		5	–	3	–	0
Colgate		–		5	–	3	–	0
Penn State		–		5	–	3	–	1
Syracuse		–		5	–	5	–	0
Temple		–		4	–	4	–	1
Tufts		–		4	–	4	–	1
Columbia		–		4	–	5	–	0
Villanova		–		4	–	5	–	0
Holy Cross		–		4	–	5	–	1
Dartmouth		–		3	–	5	–	1
Boston University		–		3	–	5	–	0
Duquesne		–		2	–	6	–	1
Hofstra		–		2	–	6	–	0
NYU		–		1	–	5	–	1
CCNY		–		1	–	7	–	0
Harvard		–		1	–	7	–	0
Brown		–		1	–	8	–	0
Pittsburgh		–		1	–	8	–	0
Boston College		–		0	–	9	–	1
Rankings from AP Poll

The 1950 Holy Cross Crusaders football team was an American football team that represented the College of the Holy Cross as an independent during the 1950 college football season. In its seventh, non-consecutive year under head coach Eddie Anderson, the team compiled a 4–5–1 record.

Johnny Turco ranked fifth in major college football in 1950 with 102 points scored on 16 touchdowns. Chuck Maloy ranked ninth nationally with 104 pass completions (good for 1,572 yards), but his completion percentage was 43.0% and he threw 19 interceptions.

The team played its home games at Fitton Field in Worcester, Massachusetts.

== Schedule ==
Date	Opponent	Site	Result	Attendance	Source
September 30	at Dartmouth	Memorial Field; Hanover, NH	T 21–21	13,000	
October 7	Brown	Fitton Field; Worcester, MA	W 41–21	20,000	
October 14	at Colgate	Colgate Athletic Field; Hamilton, NY	L 28–35	7,000	
October 21	Syracuse^{†}	Fitton Field; Worcester, MA	L 27–34	18,000	
October 28	at Yale	Yale Bowl; New Haven, CT	L 13–14	30,000	
November 4	at Harvard	Harvard Stadium; Boston, MA	W 26–7	11,000	
November 11	at Marquette	Marquette Stadium; Milwaukee, WI	L 19–21	16,500	
November 18	Georgetown	Fitton Field; Worcester, MA	L 14–21	12,000	
November 25	Temple	Fitton Field; Worcester, MA	W 26–21	5,000	
December 2	vs. Boston College	Braves Field; Boston, MA (rivalry)	W 32–14	25,035	
^{†}Homecoming
