= 1950 Temple Owls football team =

American college football season

1950 Temple Owls football
- Conference: Independent
- Record: 4–4–1
- Head coach: Albert Kawal (2nd season)
- Home stadium: Temple Stadium

1950 Eastern college football independents records
	Conf.			Overall
Team	W	L	T	W		L		T
Franklin & Marshall		–		9	–	0	–	0
No. 6 Princeton		–		9	–	0	–	0
St. Lawrence		–		8	–	0	–	0
Thiel		–		7	–	0	–	0
No. 2 Army		–		8	–	1	–	0
Fordham		–		8	–	1	–	0
Carnegie Tech		–		7	–	1	–	0
Drexel		–		6	–	1	–	0
Cornell		–		7	–	2	–	0
Gannon		–		6	–	2	–	0
Bucknell		–		6	–	3	–	0
Penn		–		6	–	3	–	0
Yale		–		6	–	3	–	0
Buffalo		–		5	–	3	–	0
Colgate		–		5	–	3	–	0
Penn State		–		5	–	3	–	1
Syracuse		–		5	–	5	–	0
Temple		–		4	–	4	–	1
Tufts		–		4	–	4	–	1
Columbia		–		4	–	5	–	0
Villanova		–		4	–	5	–	0
Holy Cross		–		4	–	5	–	1
Dartmouth		–		3	–	5	–	1
Boston University		–		3	–	5	–	0
Duquesne		–		2	–	6	–	1
Hofstra		–		2	–	6	–	0
NYU		–		1	–	5	–	1
CCNY		–		1	–	7	–	0
Harvard		–		1	–	7	–	0
Brown		–		1	–	8	–	0
Pittsburgh		–		1	–	8	–	0
Boston College		–		0	–	9	–	1
Rankings from AP Poll

The 1950 Temple Owls football team was an American football team that represented Temple University as an independent during the 1950 college football season. In its second season under head coach Albert Kawal, the team compiled a 4–4–1 record and outscored opponents by a total of 173 to 132. The team played its home games at Temple Stadium in Philadelphia.

== Schedule ==
Date	Opponent	Site	Result	Attendance	Source
September 23	Albright	Temple Stadium; Philadelphia, PA	W 32–6	7,500	
September 29	Syracuse	Temple Stadium; Philadelphia, PA	W 7–6	12,000	
October 14	at Rutgers	Rutgers Stadium; New Brunswick, NJ	L 20–26	14,000	
October 21	Wayne	Temple Stadium; Philadelphia, PA	W 26–0	5,000	
October 28	at Penn State	New Beaver Field; State College, PA	T 7–7	20,428	
November 4	Delaware	Temple Stadium; Philadelphia, PA	W 39–0	5,000	
November 11	Bucknell	Temple Stadium; Philadelphia, PA	L 0–35	7,500	
November 18	Fordham	Temple Stadium; Philadelphia, PA	L 21–26	7,000	
November 25	at Holy Cross	Fitton Field; Worcester, MA	L 21–26	5,000	
