= 1950 Dartmouth Indians football team =

American college football season

1950 Dartmouth Indians football
- Conference: Independent
- Record: 3–5–1
- Head coach: Tuss McLaughry (8th season)
- Captain: Paul Staley
- Home stadium: Memorial Field

1950 Eastern college football independents records
	Conf.			Overall
Team	W	L	T	W		L		T
Franklin & Marshall		–		9	–	0	–	0
No. 6 Princeton		–		9	–	0	–	0
St. Lawrence		–		8	–	0	–	0
Thiel		–		7	–	0	–	0
No. 2 Army		–		8	–	1	–	0
Fordham		–		8	–	1	–	0
Carnegie Tech		–		7	–	1	–	0
Drexel		–		6	–	1	–	0
Cornell		–		7	–	2	–	0
Gannon		–		6	–	2	–	0
Bucknell		–		6	–	3	–	0
Penn		–		6	–	3	–	0
Yale		–		6	–	3	–	0
Buffalo		–		5	–	3	–	0
Colgate		–		5	–	3	–	0
Penn State		–		5	–	3	–	1
Syracuse		–		5	–	5	–	0
Temple		–		4	–	4	–	1
Tufts		–		4	–	4	–	1
Columbia		–		4	–	5	–	0
Villanova		–		4	–	5	–	0
Holy Cross		–		4	–	5	–	1
Dartmouth		–		3	–	5	–	1
Boston University		–		3	–	5	–	0
Duquesne		–		2	–	6	–	1
Hofstra		–		2	–	6	–	0
NYU		–		1	–	5	–	1
CCNY		–		1	–	7	–	0
Harvard		–		1	–	7	–	0
Brown		–		1	–	8	–	0
Pittsburgh		–		1	–	8	–	0
Boston College		–		0	–	9	–	1
Rankings from AP Poll

The 1950 Dartmouth Indians football team was an American football team that represented Dartmouth College as an independent during the 1950 college football season. In their eighth season under head coach Tuss McLaughry, the Indians compiled a 3–5–1 record, and were outscored 157 to 123 by their opponents. Paul Staley was the team captain.

Dartmouth played its home games at Memorial Field on the college campus in Hanover, New Hampshire.

== Schedule ==
Date	Opponent	Site	Result	Attendance	Source
September 30	Holy Cross	Memorial Field; Hanover, NH	T 21–21	13,000	
October 7	at No. 19 Michigan	Michigan Stadium; Ann Arbor, MI	L 7–27	74,903	
October 14	at Penn	Franklin Field; Philadelphia, PA	L 26–42	38,000	
October 21	Lehigh	Memorial Field; Hanover, NH	L 14–16	12,350	
October 28	at Harvard	Harvard Stadium; Boston, MA (rivalry)	W 27–7	28,000	
November 4	at Yale	Yale Bowl; New Haven, CT	W 7–0	35,000	
November 11	at Columbia	Baker Field; New York, NY	W 14–7	14,000	
November 18	Cornell	Memorial Field; Hanover, NH (rivalry)	L 0–24	28,000	
November 25	at No. 6 Princeton	Palmer Stadium; Princeton, NJ	L 7–13	5,000	
Rankings from AP Poll released prior to the game
