= 1950 college football rankings =

- Season: 1950
- Bowl season: 1950–51 bowl games
- Preseason No. 1: Notre Dame
- End of season champions: Oklahoma

Two human polls and several math systems comprised the 1950 college football rankings. Unlike most sports, college football's governing body, the NCAA, does not bestow a national championship, instead that title is bestowed by one or more different polling agencies. There are two main weekly polls that begin in the preseason—the AP Poll and the Coaches Poll.

== Legend ==
	Increase in ranking
	Decrease in ranking
	Not ranked previous week
	National champion
(#–#)	Win–loss record
(Italics)	Number of first place votes
т	Tied with team above or below also with this symbol

== AP Poll ==
This was the first season that the AP released a preseason poll before any games were played in August. The final AP Poll was released on November 27, near the end of the 1950 regular season, weeks before the major bowls. The AP would not release a post-bowl season final poll regularly until 1968.

	Preseason Aug	Week 1 Oct 2	Week 2 Oct 9	Week 3 Oct 16	Week 4 Oct 23	Week 5 Oct 30	Week 6 Nov 6	Week 7 Nov 13	Week 8 Nov 20	Week 9 (Final) Nov 27	
1.	Notre Dame (101)	Notre Dame (1–0) (63)	Army (2–0) (115)	Army (3–0) (124)	SMU (5–0) (96)	SMU (5–0) (153)	Army (6–0) (88)	Ohio State (6–1) (66)	Oklahoma (8–0) (173)	Oklahoma (10–0) (213)	1.
2.	Army (7)	Michigan State (2–0) (32)	SMU (3–0) (53)	Oklahoma (3–0) (47)	Army (4–0) (84)	Army (5–0) (34)	Ohio State (5–1) (94)	Oklahoma (7–0) (63)	Army (8–0) (36)	Army (8–1) (38)	2.
3.	Michigan (3)	SMU (2–0) (28)	Oklahoma (2–0) (29)	SMU (4–0) (63)	Oklahoma (4–0) (35)	Oklahoma (5–0) (25)	Oklahoma (6–0) (48)	Army (7–0) (72)	Kentucky (10–0) (55)	Texas (8–1) (4)	3.
4.	Tennessee (1)	Army (1–0) (29)	Texas (2–0) (9)	Kentucky (5–0) (9)	Kentucky (6–0) (15)	Ohio State (4–1) (30)	Kentucky (8–0) (35)	California (8–0) (36)	California (9–0) (20)	Tennessee (9–1) (15)	4.
5.	Texas (7)	Oklahoma (1–0) (17)	Kentucky (4–0) (11)	California (4–0) (1)	California (5–0) (2)	Kentucky (7–0) (17)	Texas (5–1) (11)	Kentucky (9–0) (43)	Texas (7–1) (6)	California (9–0–1) (8)	5.
6.	Oklahoma (3)	Kentucky (3–0) (5)	Stanford (3–0) (4)	Stanford (4–0)	Ohio State (3–1) (2)	California (6–0) (2)	California (7–0) (14)	Texas (6–1) (10)	Illinois (7–1) (14)	Princeton (9–0) (6)	6.
7.	Stanford	Texas (1–0) (2)	California (3–0) (2)	Texas (2–1)	Texas (3–1)	Texas (4–1)	SMU (5–1) (2)	Princeton (7–0) (3)	Princeton (8–0) (8)	Kentucky (10–1) (7)	7.
8.	Illinois (1)	Stanford (2–0) (3)	Maryland (2–1) (8)	Maryland (3–1) (5)	Tennessee (4–1)	Miami (FL) (5–0) (12)	Princeton (6–0) (4)	Illinois (6–1) (1)	Ohio State (6–2)	Michigan State (8–1) (3)	8.
9.	Cornell	California (2–0) (2)	Purdue (1–1) (1)	Ohio State (2–1)	Northwestern (4–0)	Princeton (5–0) (2)	Miami (FL) (6–0) (8)	Tennessee (7–1)	Tennessee (8–1) (2)	Michigan (5–3–1)	9.
10.	SMU	Washington (2–0)	Notre Dame (1–1) (1)	Washington (4–0) (5)	Cornell (4–0) (2)	Illinois (4–1)	Illinois (5–1)	Michigan State (7–1) (3)	Michigan State (8–1) (4)	Clemson (8–0–1) (9)	10.
11.	Ohio State	North Carolina (1–1) (1)	Washington (3–0) (2)	Notre Dame (2–1)	Miami (FL) (4–0) (8)	Tennessee (5–1)	Tennessee (6–1)	Clemson (6–0–1) (7)	Clemson (7–0–1) (7)	Washington (8–2) (4)	11.
12.	USC	Alabama (2–0) (2)	Ohio State (1–1)	Clemson (3–0) (4)	Illinois (3–1) (1)	Washington (5–1)	Michigan State (6–1)	Texas A&M (6–2) (1)	Wyoming (8–0) (3)	Wyoming (9–0) (4)	12.
13.	Kentucky	UCLA (2–0)	Clemson (3–0) (4)	Vanderbilt (4–0)	Texas A&M (4–1)	Michigan State (5–1)	Clemson (5–0–1) (7)	Wyoming (8–0) (2)	Penn (6–2)	Illinois (7–2)	13.
14.	California	Duke (2–0)	Tennessee (2–1)	Miami (FL) (3–0) (14)	Michigan (2–2)	Clemson (4–0–1) (3)	Wyoming (7–0) (2)	SMU (5–2)	Miami (FL) (7–0–1) (1)	Ohio State (6–3)	14.
15.	Maryland	Illinois (1–0) (1)	Rice (2–0) (1) т	Rice (3–0)	Michigan State (4–1)	Penn (4–1)	Wisconsin (5–1)	Wisconsin (6–1)	SMU (6–2)	Miami (FL) (8–0–1) (1)	15.
16.	Duke	Cornell (1–0)	Wisconsin (2–0) т	Wisconsin (3–0)	Clemson (3–0–1)	Maryland (4–2)	Nebraska (4–1–1)	Wake Forest (5–1–1)	Nebraska (6–1–1) (2)	Ohio (8–2) (1)	16.
17.	Missouri	Iowa (1–0) (2)	Cornell (2–0) (2)	Cornell (3–0) (2)	Wake Forest (4–0–1)	Florida (5–1)	Washington (5–2)	Miami (FL) (6–0–1)	Alabama (7–2)	Nebraska (6–2–1) (2)	17.
18.	Minnesota	Clemson (2–0) (3)	Michigan (1–1)	Tennessee (3–1)	UCLA (3–2)	Wyoming (6–0) (2)	Maryland (5–2)	Nebraska (5–1–1) (1)	Washington (7–2)	Washington & Lee (8–2) (2)	18.
19.	Michigan State	Michigan (0–1)	Vanderbilt (3–0)	Wake Forest (3–0–1) (1)	Indiana (2–1–1)	UCLA (4–2)	Kansas (5–2) т	Washington (6–2)	Washington & Lee (7–2) (1)	Tulsa (8–1–1)	19.
20.	North Carolina	Penn (1–0)	Michigan State (2–1)	Northwestern (3–0)	Florida (4–1) (1)	Wisconsin (4–1)	Lehigh (7–0) т; UCLA (5–2) т	Penn (5–2)	Loyola Marymount (7–0) (1)	Tulane (6–2)	20.
	Preseason Aug	Week 1 Oct 2	Week 2 Oct 9	Week 3 Oct 16	Week 4 Oct 23	Week 5 Oct 30	Week 6 Nov 6	Week 7 Nov 13	Week 8 Nov 20	Week 9 (Final) Nov 27	
		Dropped: Maryland; Minnesota; Missouri; Ohio State; Princeton; Tennessee; USC	Dropped: Alabama; Duke; Illinois; Iowa; North Carolina; Penn; UCLA	Dropped: Michigan; Michigan State; Purdue	Dropped: Maryland; Notre Dame; Rice; Stanford; Vanderbilt; Washington; Wisconsin	Dropped: Cornell; Indiana; Michigan; Northwestern; Texas A&M; Wake Forest	Dropped: Florida; Penn	Dropped: Kansas; Lehigh; Maryland; UCLA	Dropped: Texas A&M; Wake Forest; Wisconsin	Dropped: Loyola Marymount; Penn; SMU	

== Coaches Poll ==
This was the first year for the UP Coaches Poll, and its final edition was released prior to the bowl games, on December 5.
Oklahoma received 32 of the 35 first-place votes, with one vote each to Princeton, Michigan State, and Wyoming.

Ranking	Team	Conference	Bowl
1	Oklahoma	Big Seven	Lost Sugar, 7–13
2	Texas	Southwest	Lost Cotton, 14–20
3	Tennessee	SEC	Won Cotton, 20–14
4	California	Pacific Coast	Lost Rose, 6–14
5	Army	Independent	none
6	Michigan	Big Ten	Won Rose, 14–6
7	Kentucky	SEC	Won Sugar, 13–7
8	Princeton	Independent	none
9	Michigan State	Independent	none
10	Ohio State	Big Ten	none
11	Illinois	Big Ten	none
12	Clemson	Southern	Won Orange, 15–14
13	Miami (FL)	Independent	Lost Orange, 14–15
14	Wyoming	Skyline	Won Gator, 20–7
15	Baylor	Southwest	none
15	Washington	Pacific Coast	none
17	Alabama	SEC	none
18	Washington & Lee	Southern	none
19	Navy	Independent	none
20	Cornell	Independent	none
20	Nebraska	Big Seven	none
20	Wisconsin	Big Ten	none

== Litkenhous Ratings ==
The Litkenhous Ratings released in mid-December 1950 provided numerical rankings to over 600 college football programs. The top 100 ranked teams were:

1. Oklahoma
2. Tennessee
3. Texas
4. Kentucky
5. Army
6. Texas A&M
7. Clemson
8. Illinois
9. Tulane
10. Alabama
11. Ohio State
12. California
13. Princeton
14. Penn
15. Michigan State
16. Michigan
17. Baylor
18. UCLA
19. Wisconsin
20. SMU
21. Washington
22. Tulsa
23. Stanford
24. Pacific
25. Miami (FL)
26. LSU
27. Arkansas
28. San Francisco
29. Wyoming
30. Northwestern
31. TCU
32. Mississippi State
33. Maryland
34. Rice
35. Loyola-Los Angeles
36. John Carroll
37. Wake Forest
38. Miami (OH)
39. Ole Miss
40. Georgia
41. Nebraska
42. Cornell
43. Kansas
44. Indiana
45. Vanderbilt
46. Duke
47. Notre Dame
48. Marquette
49. Xavier
50. Navy
51. Virginia
52. Lehigh
53. Purdue
54. Georgia Tech
55. Washington & Lee
56. Cincinnati
57. North Carolina
58. Colorado
59. Texas Tech
60. Iowa
61. Santa Clara
62. Hardin Simmons
63. Missouri
64. Minnesota
65. St. Bonaventure
66. Villanova
67. Syracuse
68. South Carolina
69. USC
70. Detroit
71. Dartmouth
72. Houston
73. Arizona State
74. Florida
75. West Texas
76. San Jose State
77. Drake
78. Colgate
79. Holy Cross
80. Oregon State
81. Penn State
82. Iowa State
83. Rutgers
84. Oklahoma A&M
85. Washington State
86. Pittsburgh
87. Yale
88. North Texas
89. Columbia
90. Fordham
91. Memphis State
92. Georgetown
93. George Washington
94. Dayton
95. Baldwin Wallace
96. Oregon
97. Temple
98. William & Mary
99. Abilene Christian
100. Bucknell

== Williamson System ==
The Williamson System rankings for 1950 were as follows:

1. Oklahoma
2. Texas
3. Princeton
4. Tennessee
5. California
6. Kentucky
7. Michigan State
8. Army
9. Clemson
10. Miami (FL)
11. Illinois
12. Wyoming
13. Baylor
14. Alabama
15. Michigan
16. Washington
17. Cornell
18. Wake Forest
19. SMU
20. Penn
21. Ohio State
22. Wisconsin
23. Tulane
24. Nebraska
25. Maryland
26. Northwestern
27. Duke
28. UCLA
29. Virginia
30. Indiana
31. Mississippi State
32. Rice
33. Texas A&M
34. Stanford
35. Georgia Tech
36. LSU
37. Georgia
38. Iowa
39. Washington & Lee
40. USC
41. Notre Dame
42. North Carolina
43. Loyola-Los Angeles
44. Miami (OH)
45. South Carolina
46. Fordham
47. San Francisco
48. Navy
49. Yale
50. Ole Miss
51. Lehigh
52. Colgate
53. TCU
54. Tulsa
55. Florida
56. Cincinnati
57. Missouri
58. Vanderbilt
59. West Texas
60. Xavier
61. St. Bonaventure
62. Hardin Simmons
63. John Carroll
64.
65. Syracuse
66.
67. George Washington
68. Kansas
69. Marquette
70. Detroit
71. Penn State
72. Pittsburgh
73. Oklahoma A&M
74. Minnesota
75. Arkansas
76. Texas Tech
77. Washington State
78. Colorado
79. Arizona State
80. Pacific
81. Emory & Henry
82. VMI
83.
84. Appalachian
85. Houston
86. Texas Western
87. Rutgers
88. Dartmouth
89. Memphis State
90. Arizona
91. Wichita
92. Drake
93.
94.
95. Oregon State
96. Iowa State
97.
98. Florida State
99. Furman
100. Santa Clara
101. Purdue
102. Colorado A&M
103. Villanova
104. Columbia
105. Georgetown
106. Jacksonville State
107. Holy Cross
108. William & Mary
109. Sul Ross
110. NC State

== HBCU rankings ==
The Pittsburgh Courier, a leading African American newspaper, ranked the top 1950 teams from historically black colleges and universities using the Dickinson System in an era when college football was largely segregated. The rankings were published on December 2:

- 1. Florida A&M (8–1–1)
- 2. Southern (10–0–1)
- 3. Maryland State (8–0)
- 4. Tennessee A&I (9–2)
- 5. Langston (8–1)
- 6. North Carolina A&T (7–2–1), Alcorn (8–2)
- 8. Morgan State (6–0–2)
- 9. North Carolina College (7–2), St. Augustine's (8–1)
- 11. West Virginia State (5–3–1)
- 12. Wilberforce State (6–4)
- 13. Xavier (LA) (7–1)
- 14. Philander Smith (6–1–1)
- 15. Fort Valley State (7–3)
- 16. Bluefield State (5–3–1), Grambling (5–4–1)
- 18. Prairie View A&M (6–4), Fisk (5–2)
- 20. Benedict (5–2–1)
- 21. Bethune-Cookman (4–2–1)
- 22. Bishop (6–3)
- 23. Morris Brown (6–3)
- 24. Mississippi Industrial (6–2)
- 25. LeMoyne-Owen (4–3), Howard (5–3–1)
- 27. Virginia Union (4–4)
- 28. Kentucky State (4–4–1)
- 29. Winston-Salem State (3–3–1)
- 30. Allen (3–3)

The Associated Negro Press also published rankings on December 16:

- 1. Southern (10–0–1)
- 2. Maryland State (8–0)
- 3. Florida A&M (8–1–1)
- 4. Langston (8–1)
- 5. Tennessee A&I (9–2)
- 6. North Carolina A&T (7–2–1)
- 7. Morgan State (6–0–2)
- 8. Wilberforce State (6–4)
- 9. North Carolina College (7–2)
- 10. Alcorn (8–2)
- 11. Xavier (LA) (7–1)
- 12. West Virginia State (5–3–1)
- 13. Bishop (6–3)
- 14. St. Augustine's (8–1)
- 15. Morris Brown (6–3)
- 16. Jackson State (7–2)
- 17. Fort Valley State (7–3)
- 18. Bluefield State (5–3–1)
- 19. Prairie View A&M (6–4)
- 20. Fisk (5–2)
- 21. Benedict (5–2–1)
- 22. Allen (3–3)
- 23. Virginia Union (4–4)
- 24. LeMoyne-Owen (4–3)
- 25. Howard (5–3–1)
- 26. Lincoln (PA) (3–3–1)
- 27. Philander Smith (6–1–1)
- 28. Grambling (5–4–1)
- 29. Mississippi Industrial (6–2)
- 30. Bethune-Cookman (4–2–1)

== See also ==
- 1950 College Football All-America Team
