= 1950 St. Bonaventure Bonnies football team =

American college football season

1950 St. Bonaventure Bonnies football
- Conference: Western New York Little Three Conference
- Record: 7–2 (1–0 Little Three)
- Head coach: Joe Bach (1st season)
- Captains: Stan Zajdel; John Breslin
- Home stadium: Forness Stadium

The 1950 St. Bonaventure Bonnies football team, sometimes also referred to as the St. Bonaventure Brown Indians, was an American football team that represented St. Bonaventure University during the 1950 college football season. In its first season under head coach Joe Bach, the team compiled a 7–2 record and outscored opponents by a total of 253 to 148. The team played its home games at Forness Stadium in Olean, New York.

Quarterback Ted Marchibroda led the team on offense. He set Eastern passing records with 176 passing yards against Xavier on Thanksgiving Day and 1,577 passing yards for the season. The season mark broke the prior record set by Paul Governali in 1942.

Stan Zajdel and John Breslin were the team's co-captains. Assistant coaches included Russ Thomas (line coach) and Hugo Marcolini (backfield coach).

== Schedule ==
Date	Opponent	Site	Result	Attendance	Source
September 17	John Carroll*	Forness Stadium; Olean, NY	W 27–19	9,000	
September 23	at Houston*	Robertson Stadium; Houston, TX	W 29–14	14,000	
October 1	at Dayton*	Forness Stadium; Olean, NY	W 40–14	11,500	
October 13	at Boston University*	Fenway Park; Boston, MA	W 25–21	12,135	
October 21	at Duquesne*	Forbes Field; Pittsburgh, PA	L 12–25		
October 29	Saint Vincent*	Forness Stadium; Olean, NY	W 27–20		
November 5	at Niagara	Civic Stadium; Buffalo, NY	W 41–20		
November 11	Toledo*	Forness Stadium; Olean, NY	W 38–7	6,500	
November 23	at Xavier*	Xavier Stadium; Cincinnati, OH	L 14–21	10,000	
*Non-conference game
