= 1950 in Michigan =

- Decades: 1930s; 1940s; 1950s; 1960s; 1970s
- See also: History of Michigan; Historical outline of Michigan; List of years in Michigan; 1950 in the United States

Events from the year 1950 in Michigan.

In a poll taken by the Associated Press of newspaper and radio editors, the following stories were selected as the most important Michigan news stories of 1950 (with number of voting points in parentheses):

1. The gubernatorial election in which Republican former governor Harry Kelly was declared the winner on election night, but the incumbent Democratic governor G. Mennen Williams was declared the winner on December 13 after a statewide recount (337);
2. A five-year contract signed May 23 between the United Auto Workers (UAW) and General Motors, setting a national precedent for long-term contracts and wage increases, and which later became known as Reuther's Treaty of Detroit (223);
3. A 100-day strike by the UAW against Chrysler, lasting from January to May and idling more than 100,000 workers in the Detroit area (187);
4. The crash on June 23 of Northwest Orient Airlines Flight 2501 into Lake Michigan with the loss of 58 lives, making it the deadliest commercial airliner accident in U.S. history to that time (182);
5. The destruction by fire of the University of Michigan's Haven Hall on June 6 and the subsequent arson conviction of teaching fellow Robert H. Stacy on December 16 (94);
6. The discovery on February 21 of Stanley James' remains under a "cow shed" in Troy Township, a homicide committed by his son and covered up for three years by his family, and the subsequent trial and acquittal of the son, U.S. Marine Sgt. Carson James (74);
7. The 1950 Detroit Tigers season in which the team compiled a 95–59 (.617) record and finished second in a tight pennant race with the New York Yankees (68);
8. The rape and murder by strangulation of Western Michigan College coed Carolyn Drown with her body being discovered on December 3 in melting snow in a cornfield outside Kalamazoo (54);
9. The December 16 order by the U.S. Economic Stabilization Agency freezing prices on 1951 automobiles and rolling back price increases already placed in effect (54);
10. A coal shortage during record cold weather in February that forced schools to close (49);
11. The collision in Lake Huron on June 25 between the City of Cleveland III cruise ship and a Norwegian freighter, resulting in four deaths among passengers on the cruise ship (47);
12. A production record in the automobile industry (47);
13. A gun battle on December 8 between Saginaw Police and ex-convict Lawrence Nelson and his companion Sylvia Van Conant resulting in the deaths of Nelson and a police officer (45);
14. Republican "economy" budget (45);
15. The State of Michigan's civil defense preparations (45);
16. The seizure of Governor G. Mennen Williams on July 8 by three inmates in an attempted prison escape from the Marquette Branch Prison (42);
17. The murder of eight-year-old Joey Housey by a "sex degenerate" and the discovery of his body on September 24 in a shallow grave near his home in St. Clair Shores (33);
18. Michigan's bid to play in the 1951 Rose Bowl (31);
19. A February 16 explosion in a two-story paint manufacturing building at Dow Chemical in Midland killing eight men and injuring 25 (30); and
20. Michigan's growth as measured in the 1950 United States census (20).

Other sports highlights included (1) the 1949–50 Detroit Red Wings' victory in the Stanley Cup finals, (2) the Detroit Lions acquisition in April 1950 of quarterback Bobby Layne, with Layne serving as the team's quarterback for nine years and leading the team to three NFL championships, and (3) the 1950 Michigan Wolverines football team's winning the Big Ten Conference championship by defeating Ohio State in the Snow Bowl.

== Office holders ==
=== State office holders ===
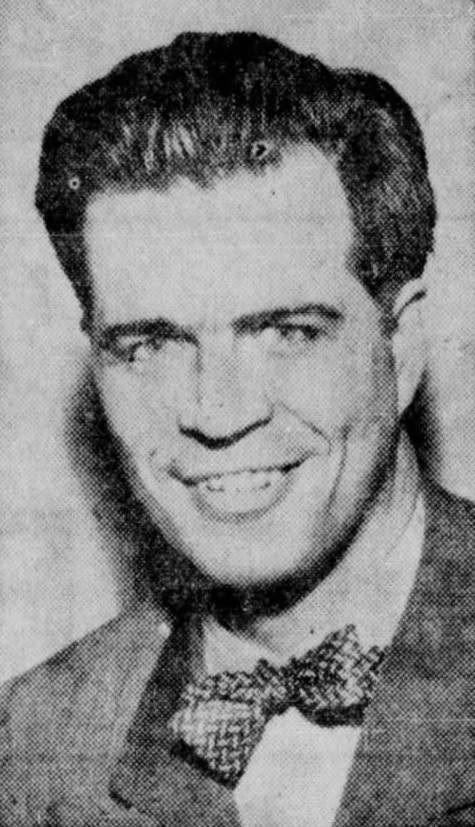
Gov. G. Mennen Williams

- Governor of Michigan: G. Mennen Williams (Democrat)
- Lieutenant Governor of Michigan: John W. Connolly (Democrat)
- Michigan Attorney General: Stephen John Roth
- Michigan Secretary of State: Frederick M. Alger Jr. (Republican)
- Speaker of the Michigan House of Representatives: Victor A. Knox (Republican)
- Chief Justice, Michigan Supreme Court: Emerson R. Boyles

=== Mayors of major cities ===
- Mayor of Detroit: Albert Cobo
- Mayor of Grand Rapids: Stanley J. Davis/Paul G. Goebel
- Mayor of Flint: George G. Wills/Paul Lovegrove
- Mayor of Lansing: Ralph Crego
- Mayor of Dearborn: Orville L. Hubbard
- Mayor of Ann Arbor: William E. Brown Jr.

=== Federal office holders ===
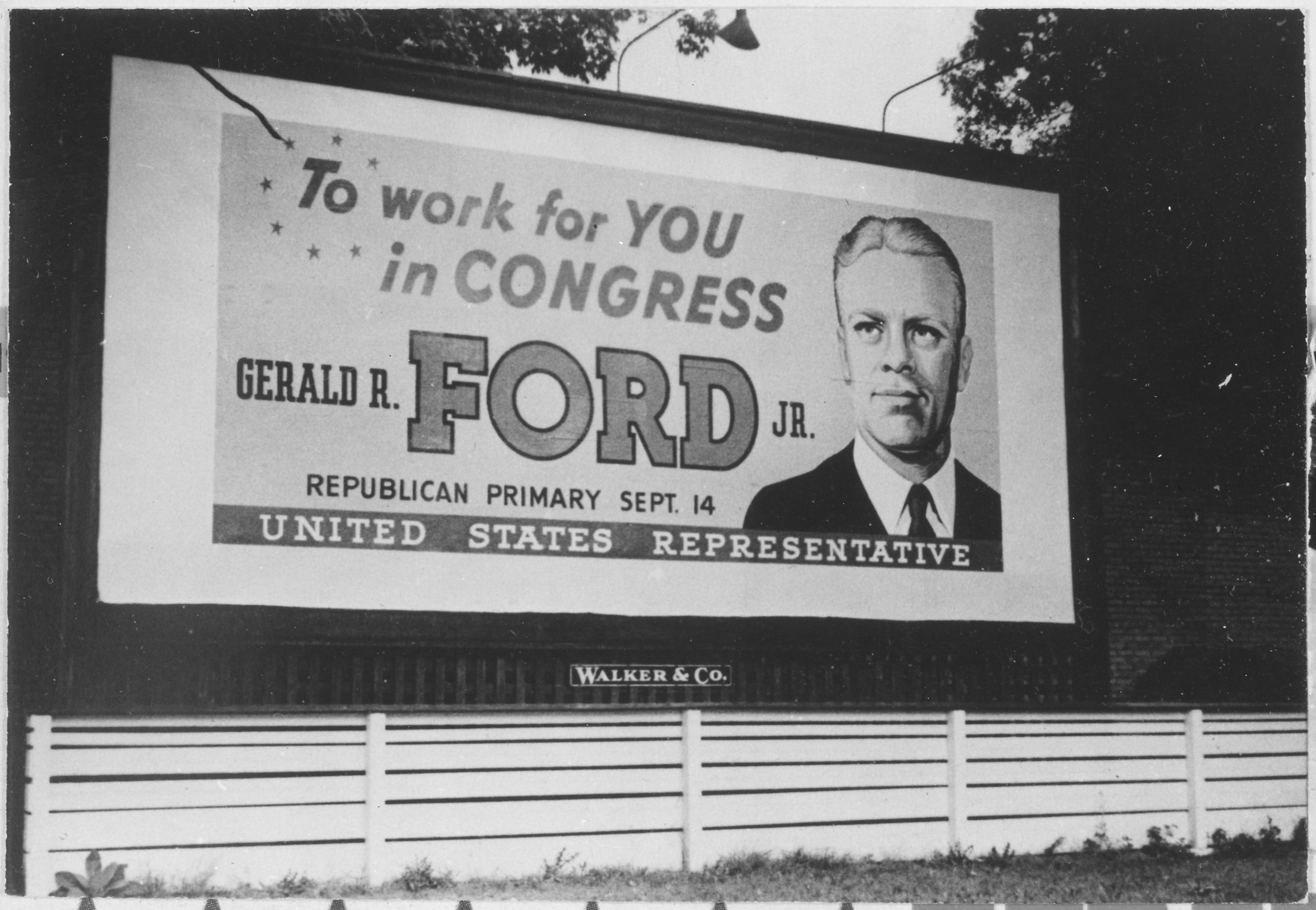
A billboard for challenger Gerald Ford in the 1948 Michigan Republican primary.

- U.S. senator from Michigan: Homer S. Ferguson (Republican)
- U.S. senator from Michigan: Arthur Vandenberg (Republican)
- House District 1: George G. Sadowski (Democrat)
- House District 2: Earl C. Michener (Republican)
- House District 3: Paul W. Shafer (Republican)
- House District 4: Clare Hoffman (Republican)
- House District 5: Gerald Ford (Republican)
- House District 6: William W. Blackney (Republican)
- House District 7: Jesse P. Wolcott (Republican)
- House District 8: Fred L. Crawford (Republican)
- House District 9: Albert J. Engel (Republican)
- House District 10: Roy O. Woodruff (Republican)
- House District 11: Charles E. Potter (Republican)
- House District 12: John B. Bennett (Republican)
- House District 13: George D. O'Brien (Democrat)
- House District 14: Louis C. Rabaut (Democrat)
- House District 15: John D. Dingell Sr. (Democrat)
- House District 16: John Lesinski Sr. (Democrat)
- House District 17: George Anthony Dondero (Republican)

== Population ==
In the 1950 United States census, Michigan was recorded as having a population of 6,421,000 persons, ranking as the seventh most populous state in the country. By 1960, the state's population had grown 22.8% to 7,823,194 persons.

=== Cities ===
The following is a list of cities in Michigan with a population of at least 40,000 based on 1950 U.S. Census data. Historic census data from 1940 and 1960 is included to reflect trends in population increases or decreases. Cities that are part of the Detroit metropolitan area are shaded in tan.

1950 Rank	City	County	1940 Pop.	1950 Pop.	1960 Pop.	Change 1950-60
1	Detroit	Wayne	1,623,452	1,849,568	1,670,144	−9.7%
2	Grand Rapids	Kent	164,292	176,515	177,313	0.5%
3	Flint	Genesee	151,543	163,143	196,940	20.7%
4	Dearborn	Wayne	63,589	94,994	112,007	17.9%
5	Saginaw	Saginaw	82,794	92,918	98,265	5.8%
6	Lansing	Ingham	78,753	92,129	107,807	17.0%
7	Pontiac	Oakland	66,626	73,681	82,233	11.6%
8	Kalamazoo	Kalamazoo	54,097	57,704	82,089	42.4%
9	Bay City	Bay	47,956	52,523	53,604	2.1%
10	Jackson	Jackson	49,656	51,088	50,720	−0.7%
11	Battle Creek	Calhoun	43,453	48,666	44,169	−9.2%
12	Muskegon	Muskegon	47,697	48,429	46,485	−4.0%
13	Ann Arbor	Washtenaw	29,815	48,251	67,340	39.6%
14	Royal Oak	Oakland	25,087	46,898	80,612	71.9%
15	Warren	Macomb	23,658	42,653	89,246	109.2%

=== Counties ===
The following is a list of counties in Michigan with populations of at least 100,000 based on 1950 U.S. Census data. Historic census data from 1940 and 1960 are included to reflect trends in population increases or decreases. Counties that are part of the Detroit metropolitan area are shaded in tan.

1980 Rank	County	Largest city	1940 Pop.	1950 Pop.	1960 Pop.	Change 1950-60
1	Wayne	Detroit	2,015,623	2,435,235	2,666,297	9.5%
2	Oakland	Pontiac	254,068	396,001	690,259	74.3%
3	Kent	Grand Rapids	246,338	288,292	363,187	26.0%
4	Genesee	Flint	227,944	270,963	374,313	38.1%
5	Macomb	Warren	107,638	184,961	405,804	119.4%
6	Ingham	Lansing	130,616	172,941	211,296	22.2%
7	Saginaw	Saginaw	130,468	153,515	190,752	24.3%
8	Washtenaw	Ann Arbor	80,810	134,606	172,440	28.1%
9	Kalamazoo	Kalamazoo	100,085	126,707	169,712	33.9%
10	Muskegon	Muskegon	94,501	121,545	129,943	6.9%
11	Calhoun	Battle Creek	94,206	120,813	138,858	14.9%
12	Berrien	Benton Harbor	89,117	115,702	149,865	29.5%
13	Jackson	Jackson	93,108	108,168	131,994	22.0%

== Companies ==
The following is a list of major companies based in Michigan in 1950.

Company	1950 sales (millions)	1950 net earnings (millions)	Headquarters	Core business
General Motors	$7,531.1	$834.0	Detroit	Automobiles
Ford Motor Company	na	na		Automobiles
Chrysler	$2,191.7	$127.9		Automobiles
Studebaker Corp.	$477.1	$22.5		Automobiles
Briggs Mfg. Co.	$339.2	$16.6	Detroit	Automobile parts supplier
S. S. Kresge	$294.8	$19.7		Retail
Hudson Motor Car Co.	$267.2	$12.0	Detroit	Automobiles
Detroit Edison	$154.4	$16.3		Electric utility
Michigan Bell	$143.7	$17.9		Telephone utility
Fruehauf Trailer Co.	$132.1	$8.6	Detroit	Truck trailers
Consumers Power	$114.4	$15.6	Jackson	Electric and natural gas utility
Kellogg's	$106.1	$10.1	Battle Creek	Breakfast cereal, including a new product in 1950 called "Corn Pops"
Parke-Davis	$105.7	$17.9	Detroit	Pharmaceutical
Clark Equipment Co.	$69	$4.8	Buchanan	Industrial and construction machinery
REO Motor Car Co.	$55.6	$2.1	Lansing	Automobiles
Whirlpool Corporation		$4.5	Benton Harbor	Home appliances
Kaiser-Frazer			Willow Run	Automobiles
Burroughs Adding Machine		$8.0		Business machines

== Sports ==
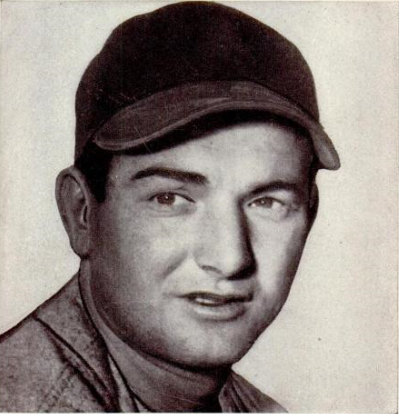
George Kell

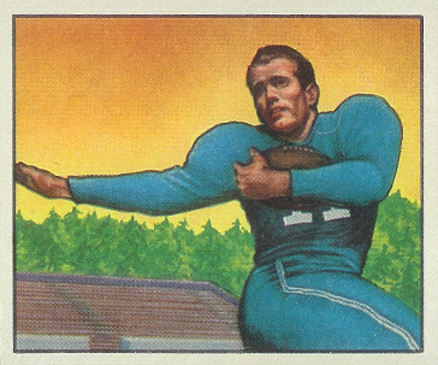
Cloyce Box

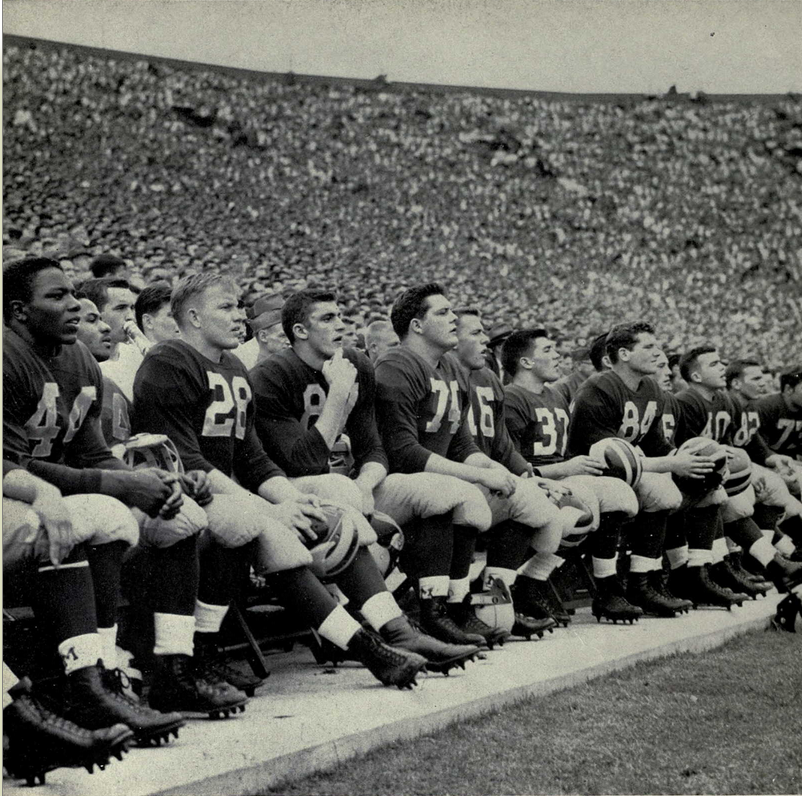
Michigan football bench, 1950

=== Baseball ===
- 1950 Detroit Tigers season – The Tigers compiled a 95–59 (.617) record and finished in second place in the American League, three games behind the New York Yankees. Red Rolfe was the manager, and the team's statistical leaders included George Kell (.340 batting average), Vic Wertz (27 home runs and 123 RBIs), and Art Houtteman (19 wins and 3.54 ERA). Kell led Major League Baseball with 218 hits and 56 doubles, both career highs, and was third in batting average. Hoot Evers also ranked among the American League leaders with a .323 batting average, .408 on-base percentage, and 103 RBIs, and led the league with 11 triples.
- 1950 Michigan Wolverines baseball season - Under head coach Ray Fisher, the Wolverines compiled an 18–9 record and tied for the Big Ten Conference championship. Bob Wolff was the team captain.

=== American football ===
- 1950 Detroit Lions season – The Lions compiled a 6–6 record under head coach Bo McMillin. With 323 points scored (26.8 points per game), the Lions ranked third in the NFL in scoring offense. Bobby Layne led the NFL with 2,323 passing yards (193.6 yards per game) and 2,573 yards of total offense, and Doak Walker led the league with 128 points scored. The team's other statistical leaders included Bob Hoernschemeyer (5.6 rushing yards per carry, third highest in the NFL) and Cloyce Box (1,009 receiving yards, second most in the NFL in 1950). On defense, Don Doll's 12 interceptions ranked second in the NFL.
- 1950 Michigan Wolverines football team – The Wolverines compiled a 6–3–1 record under head coach Bennie Oosterbaan, won the Big Ten Conference championship after defeating Ohio State in the Snow Bowl, was ranked No. 9 in the final AP Poll, and defeated California in the 1951 Rose Bowl.
- 1950 Michigan State Spartans football team – The Spartans compiled an 8–1 record, including road victories over Michigan, Notre Dame, and Pitt, under head coach Biggie Munn and were ranked No. 8 in the final AP Poll. Two players from the 1950 Michigan State team were selected as first-team All-Americans: Sonny Grandelius and Dorne Dibble.
- 1950 Detroit Titans football team - The Titans compiled a 6–3–1 record under head coach Chuck Baer.
- 1950 Central Michigan Chippewas football team – The Chippewas compiled a 6–4 record under head coach Warren Schmakel.
- 1950 Michigan State Normal Hurons football team – The Hurons compiled a 3–6 record under head coach Harry Ockerman.
- 1950 Western Michigan Broncos football team – The Broncos compiled a 5–4 record under head coach John Gill.
- Michigan high school football championship - Flint Northern High School under coach Guy Houston and led by halfback Leroy Bolden

=== Basketball ===
- 1949–50 Detroit Titans men's basketball team - The Titans compiled a 20–6 record under head coach Bob Calihan.
- 1949–50 Michigan Wolverines men's basketball team – The Wolverines compiled an 11–11 record under head coach Ernie McCoy. Mack Supronowicz and Leo VanderKuy led the team with 278 and 274 points, respectively.
- 1949–50 Michigan State Spartans men's basketball team – The Spartans compiled a 4–18 record under head coach Al Kircher.
- 1949–50 Western Michigan Broncos men's basketball team - The Broncos compiled a 12–10 record under head coach Bill Perigo.

=== Ice hockey ===
- 1949–50 Detroit Red Wings season – The Red Wings compiled a 37–19–14 record under head coach Tommy Ivan and won the Stanley Cup championship. The team's statistical leaders included Gordie Howe (35 goals), Ted Lindsay (55 assists and 78 points), and Terry Sawchuk (2.29 goals against average). The three members of the Red Wings' famed Production Line finished first, second, third in points scored among NHL players: Lindsay (78); Sid Abel (69); and Howe (68). Lindsay also led the NHL in assists, and Howe finished second in goals behind Maurice Richard.
- 1949–50 Michigan Wolverines men's ice hockey team – The Wolverines compiled a 23–4 record and finished third in the 1950 Frozen Four under head coach Vic Heyliger.
- 1949–50 Michigan State Spartans men's ice hockey team – The Spartans compiled a 0–14 record under head coach Harold Paulsen.
- 1949–50 Michigan Tech Huskies men's ice hockey team – The Huskies compiled a 10–7 record under head coach Amo Bessone.

=== Boat racing ===
- APBA Gold Cup - The Slo-Mo-Shun IV from Seattle, piloted by Ted Jones, won the 43rd annual Gold Cup race before a crowd estimated at 100,000 along the banks of the Detroit River. The Slo-Mo-Shun set a race record averaging 78.21 miles per hour on the 90-mile route.
- Harmsworth Cup - The Slo-Mo-Shun IV, piloted by Lou Fageol, won the annual speed-boat race on the Detroit River and set a lap record with a speed of 102.676 miles per hour. Fageol's time "smashed all competitive speed-boat racing records."
- Port Huron to Mackinac Boat Race – In the 26th running of the annual 342-mile sailing race, the yawl Escapade was victorious, completing the course in a record time of 25 hours, 47 minutes, and 19 seconds.

=== Boxing ===
- February 3 - World middleweight champion Jake LaMotta defeated Dick Wagner on a technical knockout in the ninth round at Olympia Stadium in Detroit. The bout was LaMotta's 17th in Detroit where he had become a fan favorite.
- September 27 - Detroit's Joe Louis, heavyweight champion from 1937 to 1949, at age 36, fought Ezzard Charles in a comeback bout at Yankee Stadium in New York. Louis had not fought since June 1948. He lost badly to Charles.

=== Golfing ===
- Motor City Open - Lloyd Mangrum won the championship at the Red Run Golf Club on July 4 with a four-round total of 274, one shot ahead of Sam Snead. Snead lost a three-stroke lead in the final nine holes.
- Michigan Open - John Barnum, won the championship at the Lenawee Country Club in Adrian.

=== Other ===
- International Bonspiel - On January 8, the Toronto Granites Curling Club won the International Bonspiel hosted by the Detroit Curling Club.
- North American Speed Skating Championships - On February 5, Jim Chapin of Bay City and Mona Donnelly of Alpena won championships in the intermediate division.
- U.S. women's indoor speed skating championship - Barbara Marchetti of Wyandotte won the United States women's indoor speed skating championship in Colorado Springs, Colorado, on February 19.

== Chronology of events ==
=== January ===
- January 3 - Albert Cobo, who had previously served as Detroit's city treasurer for 14 years, was sworn in as the new mayor of Detroit. In his inaugural address, Cobo promised to, among other things, push for early completion of expressways, resist public housing projects in outlying single home areas, raze slum areas, and expedite construction of the new City-County Building. Nine Common Council members were also sworn in, including new member Mary Beck who was the first woman to serve on the council.
- January 5 - Harry Lumley, goaltender for the Detroit Red Wings since 1944, twisted his ankle in a charity exhibition game. With Lumley injured, Terry Sawchuk was called up from the farm system. Sawchuck had the first shutout of his NHL career, a 1–0 victory over the New York Rangers, on January 15. Sawchuk played so well that the Red Wings traded Lumley in July, and Sawchuck became the team's regular goaltender through most of the 1950s and early 1960s.
- January 6 - George Thomas, a 61-year-old night watchman who on December 20 discovered a dynamite bomb in a stairwell at UAW headquarters, showed up disoriented in front of the Ford estate with a rope around his neck. He initially claimed that he had been kidnapped and tortured, but later claimed that he was depressed because he was suspected of having planted the bomb and had tried unsuccessfully to kill himself.
- January 13 - Detroit Mayor Cobo warned slum property owners to improve properties or have their buildings torn down by the city. Two weeks later, Cobo ordered 40 acres of slums on the east side to be cleared with the relocation of 950 families.
- January 15–28 fisherman were rescued from a 2,000-acre ice flow that broke loose and drifted into the middle of Houghton Lake. On February 2, another rescue effort by a small plane pilot saved 13 persons stranded on an ice flow in Saginaw Bay near Pinconning.
- January 17 - Eight prominent Detroiters were hospitalized with burns when a silver punch bowl filled with "cafe diablo" (a mixture of coffee and brandy) blew up at a dinner hosted by a union at Detroit's AFL Labor Temple. The most seriously injured included Detroit Free Press editorial director Malcolm Bingay, Judge Joseph Gillis, and union leader James Massaroni. Bingay remained hospitalized until February 8.
- January 18 - Harry Fleisher of Detroit's notorious Purple Gang, was arrested by the FBI in Pompano Beach, Florida after five years as a fugitive. He fled after he was convicted in 1945 for conspiracy in the murder of State Sen. Warren G. Hooper and the robbery of a gambling establishment.
- January 18 - The United States Junior Chamber of Commerce selected Gerald Ford, age 36, as one of the country's 10 "young men of the year." The award was presented to Ford for his fight against the "bossism" of Frank D. McKay in his home district of Grand Rapids.
- January 21 - In a trade with the Cleveland Browns, the Detroit Lions acquired exclusive draft rights to Doak Walker. Walker signed a three-year contract with the Lions on February 25. He went on to lead the NFL in scoring as a rookie for the Lions in 1950.

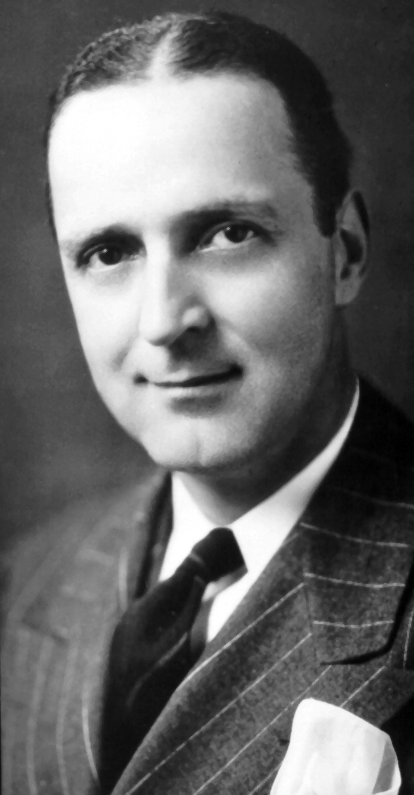
Preston Tucker

- January 22 - Auto maker Preston Tucker and several associates were found not guilty after a lengthy fraud trial brought by the U.S. Securities and Exchange Commission. Tucker had been accused of a $28 million fraud on shareholders and the public in their attempt to produce a rear engine automobile known as the "Tucker Torpedo".
- January 25 - A strike by the UAW began with 89,000 Chrysler workers walking off the job seeking, among other things, better pension benefits for retired workers. On May 4, the Chrysler Council of the UAW approved by a 119 to 6 vote a settlement providing increased pension benefits. The strike lasted 104 days from January to May, and Chrysler sustained a $1.78 million loss in the first quarter. It was the second longest strike in Detroit history and the most costly with approximately 120,000 Detroit area workers left without work (89,000 strikers at Chrysler, 22,000 workers at Briggs Manufacturing Co., and 8,000 workers with other suppliers).
- January 26 - Detroit Mayor Cobo appointed seven individuals to a new loyalty investigating committee to investigate the loyalty of city employees. The police supplied an initial list of 50 suspected subversive employees to be investigated.

=== February ===
- February - Amid a coal workers strike, Michigan's coal supply ran low. By January 12, Detroit officials reported that four days of cold weather would wipe out the city's supply. Cold weather and the ongoing coal strike heightened the coal shortage in the latter half of February and early March as Governor G. Mennen Williams declared a state of crisis, Flint and Detroit resorted to rationing, and schools were forced to close.
- February - Notices to vacate were sent to almost 800 families in slum areas to be razed for the development of public housing projects known as the Jeffries Project and the Douglass Project to be built at an estimated cost of $30 million. The Detroit Free Press called the removal "the greatest mass evictions in Detroit's history." Groundbreaking on the Douglass Project occurred on May 5 with Mayor Cobo turning the first shovel.
- February 2 - Ford Motor put 15,000 workers at its Rouge plant on a six-day work week to meet increased demand for its products.
- February 5 - The Detroit Free Press reported that Detroit resident George M. Blair left his entire estate of $40,000 to a 52-year-old parrot named Bob. Blair had no living family and said in his will: "The bird is the only friend I have. I'm leaving him everything I own."
- February 6 - Claude Monet's painting "The Seine at Asnières", purchased by the Detroit Institute of Arts in 1949, was returned to its owner after museum official learned that it had been stolen from its owner by a Nazi soldier during World War II.
- February 9 - Mary A. Pebley, age 63, was beheaded in an elevator accident at the Transportation Building in Detroit. The Detroit Free Press reported that the woman's head was "torn from her body" when the elevator suddenly shot upwards as she boarded the elevator. Her head fell to the floor of the car as "screaming passengers cowered against the back wall." A coroner's jury found that the accident was ordinary negligence and cleared the building's maintenance man of criminal liability.
- February 9 - The federal government filed a civil antitrust suit against Parke, Davis & Co. of Detroit and another company for allegedly conspiring to restrain trade and monopolize the market in hard gelatin capsules.
- February 12 - The Detroit Free Press published a feature story on the unmatched prosperity achieved in Flint with non-farm employment at an all-time peak of 104,600.
- February 16 - An explosion in a two-story paint manufacturing building at Dow Chemical in Midland killed eight men and injured 25. Windows were shattered a mile away, and damage was estimated at $1 million.

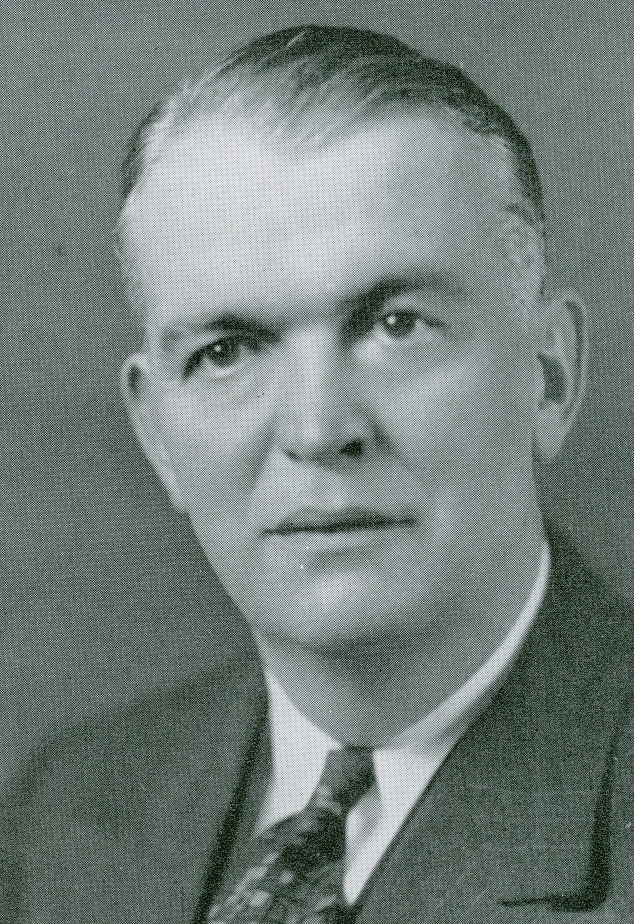
Harry Kelly

- February 17 - At a meeting attended by 200 leading Republicans in Pontiac, Harry Kelly, former governor of Michigan from 1943 to 1946, opened his campaign for the Republican nomination in the gubernatorial election.
- February 17 - Gov. G. Mennen Williams issued an executive order abolishing discrimination and segregation based on race, creed, or color in the Michigan National Guard. Michigan was the fourth state to take such action, after Connecticut, New Jersey and Illinois.
- February 20 - In a bitterly fought election viewed as a referendum on the rule of the Grand Rapids political machine run by Frank McKay, reform candidate Paul G. Goebel was elected Mayor of Grand Rapids, defeating former mayor George W. Welsh by a two-to-one margin. Welsh had resigned as mayor in 1949 to avoid a recall effort. Goebel's victory in 1950, together with Gerald Ford's 1948 victory as a reform candidate for Congress, were viewed as marking the end of McKay machine's control over Grand Rapids politics.
- February 21 - Acting on a tip from a son-in-law, police discovered the remains of Stanley James buried under a cow shed at property in Troy Township owned by his estranged wife. The son of the deceased, a U.S. Marine sergeant named Carson James, had killed his father at a family reunion in Clawson on Thanksgiving Day in 1947 and then buried the body beneath the cow shed behind his mother's house in Troy Township. The son had admitted to family members that he "blasted" the father in the head with his service pistol and claimed that the father had been abusive to the family all his life. Other family members helped bury the body and covered up the killing. The case became known in the media as the "cow shed" slaying. Carson James was arrested in the Mojave Desert in Arizona on February 22; Carson told Arizona officials he had shot his father in self-defense and that his father had claimed to have had intimate relations with Carson's wife. Carson's ex-wife claimed that Carson had told her as early as 1946 that he was planning to kill his father in the "perfect crime." He was returned to Michigan where he was tried for murder. A jury of 11 men and one woman deliberated only four hours on May 19 before finding James not guilty by reason of self-defense. After his acquittal, James said: "You get a bunch of nice old ladies on a jury and you can expect them to come up with pretty good results. I think everything turned out swell." James died in 1982 in Royal Oak at age 60.
- February 21 - A fire at Ferris Institute in Big Rapids destroyed the commerce building and its annex and the pharmacy building and damaged the alumni building. The two buildings that were destroyed contained most of the school's classrooms. Damage was estimated at $500,000.
- February 21 - Fire consumed a farmhouse near Addison, Michigan, killing farmer Gerald Beagle and his seven children, ages 23 months to 14 years. The cause of the fire was believed to be a defective furnace. The family had been burned out of another house one year earlier.
- February 23 - A fire late Thursday night and into Friday morning razed the 80-year-old Manistee County Courthouse and destroyed all county records.

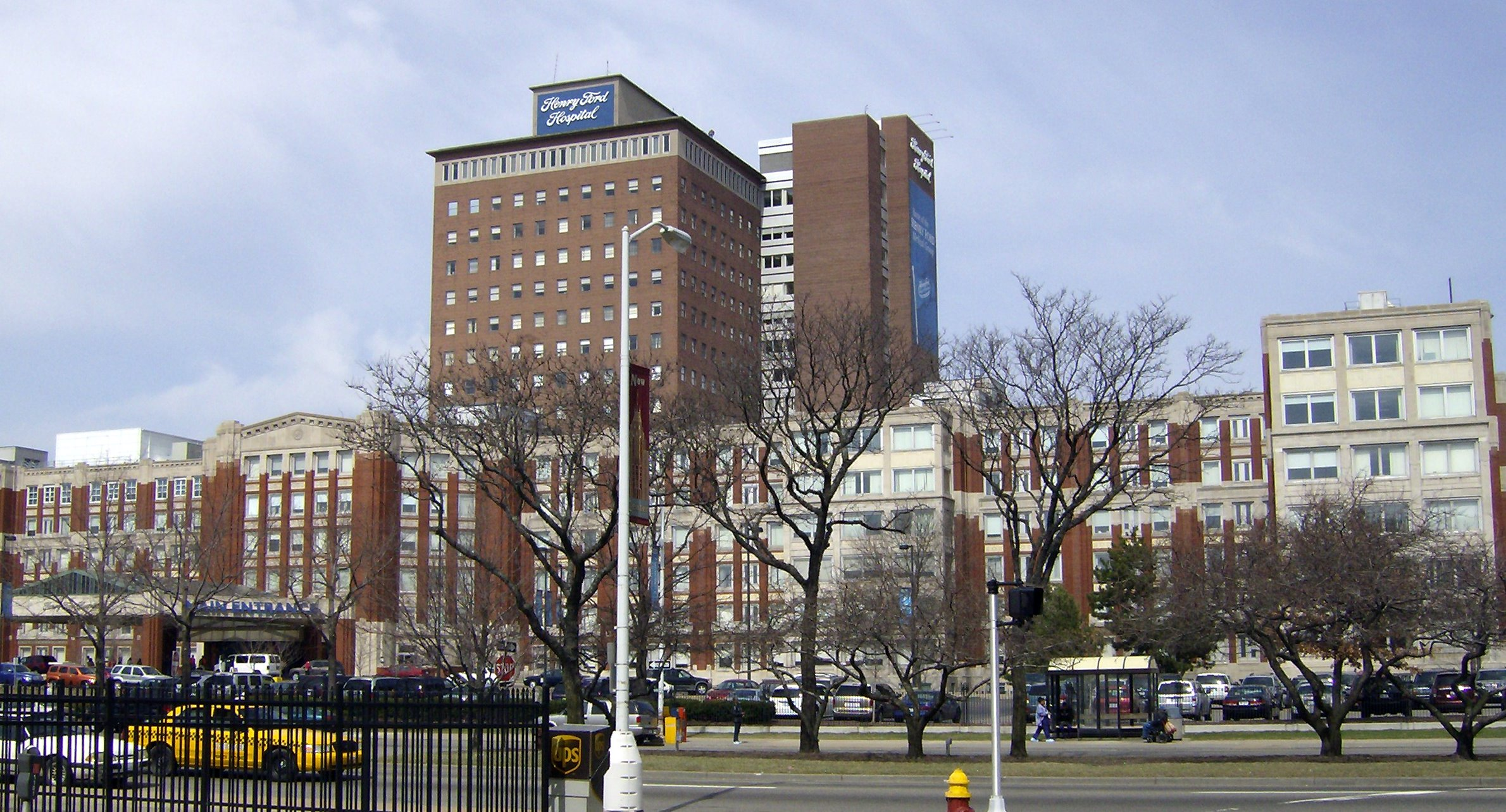
Henry Ford Hospital

- February 23 - Henry Ford Hospital announced a $13.7 million gift from the Ford Foundation to be used for construction of a 17-story skyscraper (later known as Clinic Tower) as part of the hospital campus to house 14 specialty clinics. The gift raised to $30 million the total amount given to the hospital by the Ford family, Ford Motor Co., and the Ford Foundation since the hospital's founding in 1915.
- February 24 - After a 22-day trial in Recorder's Court in Detroit, in which the government had charged Carl E. Bolton with the 1948 shooting UAW president Walter Reuther, a jury of eight women and four men deliberated for only 90 minutes before returning a verdict of innocent. Bolton was returned to state prison to complete a 10- to 15-year sentence for burglary.

=== March ===
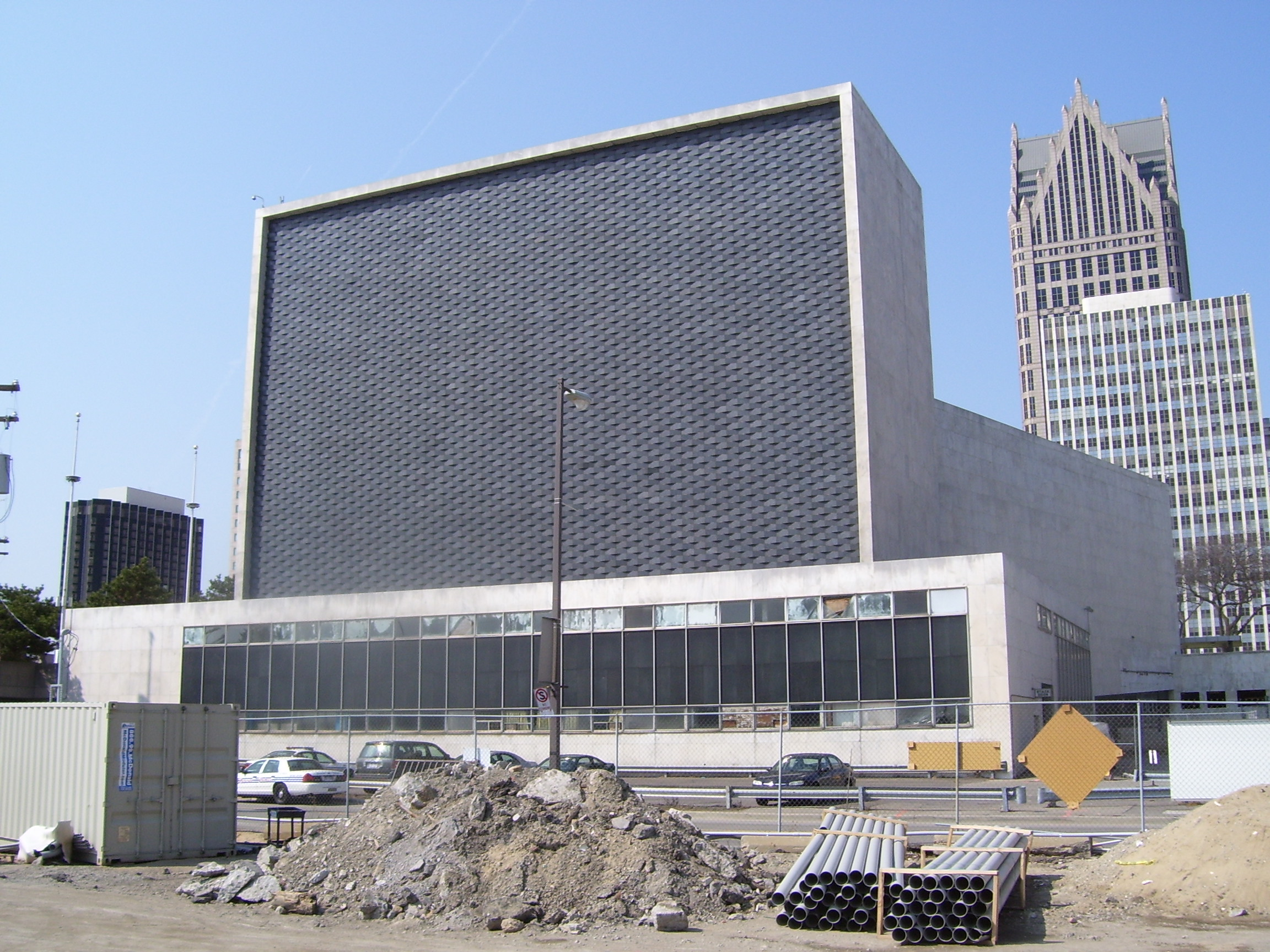
Ford Auditorium

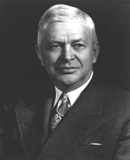
C. E. Wilson

- March 10 - Former slave James Newman celebrated his 109th birthday in Detroit. He was born into slavery in Midway, Kentucky, and moved to Detroit in approximately 1930.
- March 10 - Detroit Mayor Cobo announced a $2.5 million gift to the city from Ford Motor Company and Ford and Lincoln-Mercury dealers to build a 3,000-seat auditorium in memory of Henry and Edsel Ford. The auditorium was to be built at the foot of Woodward Avenue as part of the Civic Center in downtown Detroit. The result of the gift was Ford Auditorium which opened in 1956 and was home to the Detroit Symphony Orchestra for 33 years.
- March 13 - General Motors chairman Alfred P. Sloan and CEO C. E. Wilson reported the company's final 1949 results. The company broke its all-time records with sales of $5.7 billion, profits of $656 million, and a payroll of $1.4 billion. Financial results by Ford Motor and Chrysler, as reported in March for 1949, also broke company records. Chrysler produced 1,267,000 vehicles and had net sales of $2,084,603,547 with net earnings of $132,170,096.
- March 13 - Detroit Common Council approved Mayor Cobo's housing plan, including cancellation of 16 public housing projects in outlying residential areas, as approved under the prior mayor's administration.
- March 14 - At an FCC hearing on renewal of the broadcast licence for WJR and two other radio stations, news reporter Clete Roberts testified that station owner George A. Richards complained about a Jewish plot for Jews to take over the country and that "all Jews are Communists and most Communists are Jews." The American Jewish Congress supported revocation of Richards' broadcast licenses. Richards was accused of directing staff at his stations to slant the news, including instructions that "the CIO, Negroes, Jews, the Roosevelt family and the New Deal never be presented in a favorable light." There was also testimony that he told a news editor to advance the cause of Republican candidates and belittle the competence of the Democratic administration.
- March 15 - Detroit Lions legend Dutch Clark was hired as an assistant football coach for the Detroit Titans football team.
- March 20 - Ford Motor Co. announced plans to build three new administrative buildings, including an 11-story office building (later modified to 12 stories), on a 175-acre site at the northeast corner of Southfield and Michigan in Dearborn. Skidmore, Owings & Merrill were announced as the architects. Construction was delayed due to the outbreak of the Korean War. Construction finally began in 1953, and the building, which became Ford World Headquarters, was dedicated in September 1956.
- March 21 - The Detroit Mayor's Interracial Committee issued a report on racial change in the city, focusing on the growth of the African American population from 150,000 to 300,000 persons in 10 years. The report concluded that "shifts in racial occupancy patters" were "the single greatest challenge" to Detroit's citizens and identified four areas for action: violation of civil rights laws, control of violence, housing incidents, and "the Communist threat." Three days later, Mayor Cobo criticized the committee for failing to dispel rumors that the Mayor's slum clearance program was racially motivated.
- March 24 - With Gordie Howe finishing the season ranked second in the NHL in goals scored, the Detroit Free Press proclaimed it was time to remove the label "future great." The newspaper wrote: "His bid for stardom is out of the future tense now. Howe IS a star right now . . . "
- March 24 - The Detroit Police Department ordered all taxi dance halls to be closed within one week. The order followed a newspaper story depicting the halls as "places of immorality."
- March 25 - Mayor Cobo vetoed the site plan for Schoolcraft Gardens and said that local neighborhoods should be allowed to dictate their own zoning. The Detroit Council of Churches and Jewish Community Council criticized Cobo's veto. Schoolcraft Gardens was a proposed 400-unit biracial housing development in a white section of Detroit. The project had been approved by a 6–2 vote of the Common Council but was a subject of controversy in the 1949 mayoral election with white conservative homeowners opposed to efforts to bring public housing into their neighborhoods.
- March 25 - A progress report published by the Detroit Board of Commerce described metro Detroit as the industrial capital of the world and the country's third city based on combined business and industry. A manufacturers' census found 4,765 factories in metro Detroit in 1947, a 68% increase from 2,834 in 1939. In Wayne County alone, factory output was $7.9 billion in 1949.
- March 28 - After a former University of Washington philosophy professor and avowed Communist, Herbert Phillips, was invited to participate in a debate on the campus, Wayne University president David D. Henry issued an order prohibiting Communists from participating in any university programs. Henry justified his decision with a statement that "the Communist is not to be regarded merely as an ordinary citizen of a minor political party, but as an enemy of our national welfare, dedicated to violence, disruption and discord." On April 27, Phillips debated history professor Preston Slosson before a crowd of 250 in a cafeteria at the University of Michigan. Phillips then spoke on April 28 to 800 Wayne University students on the steps of the main library.
- March 28 - In their first game of the 1950 Semifinals series, the Red Wings lost, 5–0, to the Toronto Maple Leafs, the Red Wings' 12th straight playoff loss to the Maple Leafs. The Red Wings also lost Gordie Howe who sustained "a deep cut in his right eyeball, a fractured nose, a possible fractured cheekbone and a fractured skull" in a collision during the game's third period. Toronto goalie Turk Broda shut out the Wings three times in the series. On Easter Sunday, April 9, the Wings won Game 7, 1–0, on an overtime goal by defenseman Leo Reise.

=== April ===
- April 2 - Theodore Donay, a German-born resident of Detroit, disappeared off the California coast in a boat he rented in Avalon on Catalina Island. In 1943, he became the first person in United States history to be convicted of misprision of treason after assisting an escaped Nazi aviator in April 1942. He was accused of being part of a Nazi spy ring operating in Detroit and was sentenced to six-and-a-half years in prison and stripped of his U.S. citizenship.
- April 3 - William Voisine, the former mayor of Ecorse, was convicted of perjury by a federal jury in Washington, D.C. He was found to have lied in 1948 testimony to a Congressional committee denying his receipt of cash overpayments for steel sold by his company in Detroit. Voisine was sentenced to eight months in prison.
- April 5 - The body of former Detroit mayor Edward Jeffries lay in state at City Hall as an estimated 20,000 persons, including many dignitaries, walked past the bier. It was "believed to be the largest crowd ever to view the body of a dignitary in Detroit's history."
- April 7 - Four men were arrested by the Detroit police after dynamite bombing a Big Bear market on Fenkell in Detroit and then extorting the company of $3,500 to prevent further bombings.
- April 7 - At the request of Douglas MacArthur, a group of Japanese industrial leaders toured Ford Motor facilities in Detroit to study American manufacturing processes.
- April 8 - The Detroit Lions traded Camp Wilson to the New York Yankees for Bobby Layne. Layne was the Lions quarterback for nine years from 1950 to 1958 and led the team to three NFL championships in 1952, 1953, and 1957.
- April 11 - Sen. Arthur Vandenberg from Michigan underwent surgery at Georgetown Hospital in Washington to remove a tumor near his spine. Tests showed the tumor was not malignant. Six months earlier, he had the lower lobe of his left lung removed. He died one year later at age 67.
- April 18 - Pete Newell, age 34, was hired as the head basketball coach at Michigan State College. He had been head basketball coach at the University of San Francisco.
- April 21 - The Detroit Tigers defeated the Chicago White Sox, 4–1, in their home opener before a crowd of 44,642 at Briggs Stadium. Vic Wertz hit a three-run home run for Detroit, and Virgil Trucks held Chicago to five hits.
- April 23 - The Detroit Red Wings defeated the New York Rangers in Game 7 of the Stanley Cup finals. Pete Babando scored the game-winning goal in double overtime.

=== May ===
- May 3 - The University of Michigan announced the creation of a School of Natural Resources, the first of its type to focus on conservation of natural resources with Samuel T. Dana as dean.
- May 5 - General Motors chairman Alfred P. Sloan and CEO C. E. Wilson announced record profits of $212.4 million on sales of $1.28 billion for the first three months of 1950.
- May 6 - A new collective bargaining agreement, including $100-a-month pensions, between the UAW and Chrysler was approved in a vote of workers at 27 locals, ending a 100-day strike that cost an estimated billion dollars. The locals approved the contract by votes of 94 to 98 percent. Chrysler plants resumed operations on May 8, and 4,000 cars and trucks were assembled on the first day as the company sought to recapture its market.
- May 8 - The United States Supreme Court unanimously held Michigan's Bonine-Tripp Act unconstitutional as an invasion of a field occupied by the federal government with the Taft–Hartley Act. The Michigan law, which was challenged by the UAW, required a state mediation board to conduct a strike vote upon the request of either the union or the employer, forbade strikes until such votes were conducted, and provided criminal penalties for union leaders who called strikes before such a vote.
- May 16 - University of Detroit president Rev. Celestin Steiner announced a $20 million expansion plan with $10 million earmarked for the construction of six new buildings, including a 9,000-seat field house, by the time of the school's 75th anniversary in 1952. University of Detroit Memorial Field House opened in 1952.
- May 20 - The Michigan Legislature approved a plan proposed by Detroit Mayor Cobo to expedite construction of expressways in Detroit, including completion of the Ford (I-94) and Lodge expressways (M-10). The plan called for the issuance of $100 million in bonds jointly backed by the city, county, and state and to be repaid out of gas and weight taxes.
- May 22 - After a two-week trial, Eugene Braunsdorf, a 52-year-old former Detroit Symphony Orchestra musician, was found innocent by reason of temporary insanity in a trial for killing his daughter. One year earlier, while sitting in his car at Eight Mile Road and Evergreen, he had shot his 29-year-old daughter, "a spastic paralytic," four times and then shot himself; she died and he survived. The shooting was described as a "mercy killing". Following the verdict, Braunsdorf was committed by the judge to the Ionia State Hospital for the Criminally Insane for the rest of his life. However, two weeks after the verdict, psychiatrists testified at a hearing that Braundsorf had fully recovered his sanity, and the judge granted his unconditional freedom.

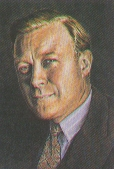
Walter Reuther

- May 23 - GM and the UAW reached a five-year contract that became known as Reuther's Treaty of Detroit. The UAW reached similar five-year deals with Ford and Chrysler, protecting the companies from annual negotiations and strikes and giving workers improved health, vacation, and pension benefits and cost-of-living adjustments to wages. The contract shaped labor-management relations in the auto industry for decades.
- May 23 - Livonia was incorporated into a city by vote of the citizens of the township. The proposal was approved by a vote of 2,953 to 1,487. Jesse Ziegler was selected as the city's first mayor. Livonia's population grew to 66,702 in 1960 and 104,814 in 1970.

=== June ===
- June 6 - Haven Hall, an 87-year-old landmark structure at the University of Michigan, was destroyed by fire. The fire broke out at 4:45 p.m. while approximately 400 students were taking final exams in the building. The structure was a total loss, and a library valued at $1 million was also lost. The damage was estimated at $3.5 million. Robert H. Stacy, a 30-year-old Latin teacher at the university, was arrested on October 11, confessed to starting the fire, and tried to kill himself. He was convicted of arson on December 16.
- June 17 - University of Michigan athlete Don McEwen, a Canadian citizen, set a new NCAA record with a time of 9:01.9 in the two-mile event at the 1950 NCAA Track and Field Championships in Minneapolis.
- June 23 - Northwest Orient Airlines Flight 2501 disappeared off radar screens 18 miles northwest of Benton Harbor. The flight with 55 passengers and three crew crashed into Lake Michigan. It was the deadliest commercial airliner accident in U.S. history to that time.
- June 25 - The cruise ship City of Cleveland III was struck in heavy fog by the Norwegian freighter Ravnefjeel near Harbor Beach. Several passengers from the cruise ship were hurled into Lake Huron with four being killed and another 20 injured.
- June - An airlift brought 5,000 Puerto Ricans to Michigan to save the state's $14 million sugar beet crop. According to the Detroit Free Press, "It was the biggest mass movement of its kind in civilian history."

=== July ===
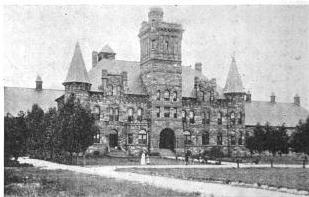
Marquette Branch Prison

- July 8 - In an unsuccessful escape attempt, Governor G. Mennen Williams was seized by three inmates in the kitchen of the Marquette Branch Prison. The governor was unharmed, though State Trooper George Kerr was stabbed in the back before shooting one of the prisoners. Another guard had his arm broken. No prisoners escaped.
- Peacetime employment reached a record level.

=== August ===
- August 4 -Dearborn Mayor Orville L. Hubbard went on a national tour while under threat of being jailed.
- August 11 - Federal judge Frank Picard dismissed a $50 million suit by shareholders of Kaiser-Frazer and approved a settlement of $1,379,000. The settlement required Henry J. Kaiser and other executives to pay $500,000 to the company and further required a subsidiary to reimburse the company $900,000 for equipment used by the subsidiary. The judge specifically ruled that Henry Kaiser and Joseph W. Frazer were innocent of any "fraud, wrongdoing, deceit or collusion."
- August 11 - James Vosyka, age 21, was killed before a crowd of 12,000 when his midget plane crashed during the Continental Trophy Race, part of the International Air Fair at the Detroit-Wayne Major Airport.

=== September ===
- Garbage began piling up after Detroit Mayor Cobo fired 2,000 Department of Public Works workers.
- September 11 - Bus drivers for the Greyhound Suburban Line providing bus service from the city to Pontiac, Birmingham, Mt. Clemens, and Wyandotte walked out as part of a wildcat strike, leaving 60,000 commuters without bus service.

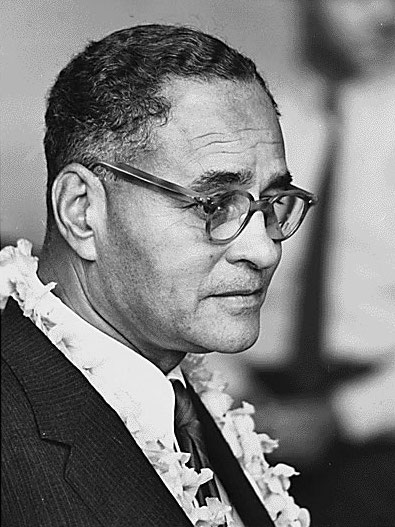
Ralph Bunche

- September 17 - Corinne Tidwell, an African American woman who had been receiving welfare benefits off-and-on since 1931, was exposed in an investigation by the Detroit Free Press as a frequent better at the Hazel Park and Detroit horse racing tracks. The Free Press wrote: "Horse racing is no longer just the sport of kings. It now is the sport of Detroit Welfare recipients."
- September 22 - Ralph Bunche, a Detroit native, was selected as the winner of the Nobel Peace Prize for his role as a United Nations mediator in bringing peace to Palestine.
- September 24 - The body of Joey Housey, an eight-year-old boy, was found two blocks from his home in St. Clair Shores. Police reported that he had been killed by a "sex degenerate" and buried in a shallow grave. The slaying and subsequent investigation was named the 17th most important Michigan news story of 1950.
- September 30 - Michigan, ranked No. 3 in the country, lost to Michigan State, 14–7, in Ann Arbor. Michigan played most of the game without its star halfback Chuck Ortmann who was injured on a 35-yard kickoff return in the first quarter.

=== October ===
- October 13 - Ennis Gillum, a 26-year-old tobacco salesman, clubbed six women and children in their homes in northwest Detroit after heavy drinking at the Michigan Tobacco and Candy Distributors Convention. His weapon was a heavy stapling machine. One of the victims, Dorothy Julian, died from a fractured skull; her 12-year-old son also sustained a fractured skull. A 13-year-old witness remembered that the assailant had a badge that said "tobacco and candy," which led the police to Gillum. Gillum told police: "When I drink, I get mean. If I can get around it, I don't drink but I was on the entertainment committee at the convention. I don't know how I left or when, and only God knows how I drove home."
- October 25 - Chrysler president K. T. Keller was named as chairman of the country's guided missile program. On November 3, Lester L. "Tex" Colbert, age 44 and previously president of the Dodge division, was named as Chrysler's new president.
- A filthy Farmington hospital for the aged was exposed.
- October 20 - Sidney J. Allen of Detroit, president of Allen Industries, was selected by the Fashion Foundation of America as one of the 12 best dressed men in the country. He was described as "a conservative, neat dresser and one of the few business executives who dresses and looks the part."

=== November ===
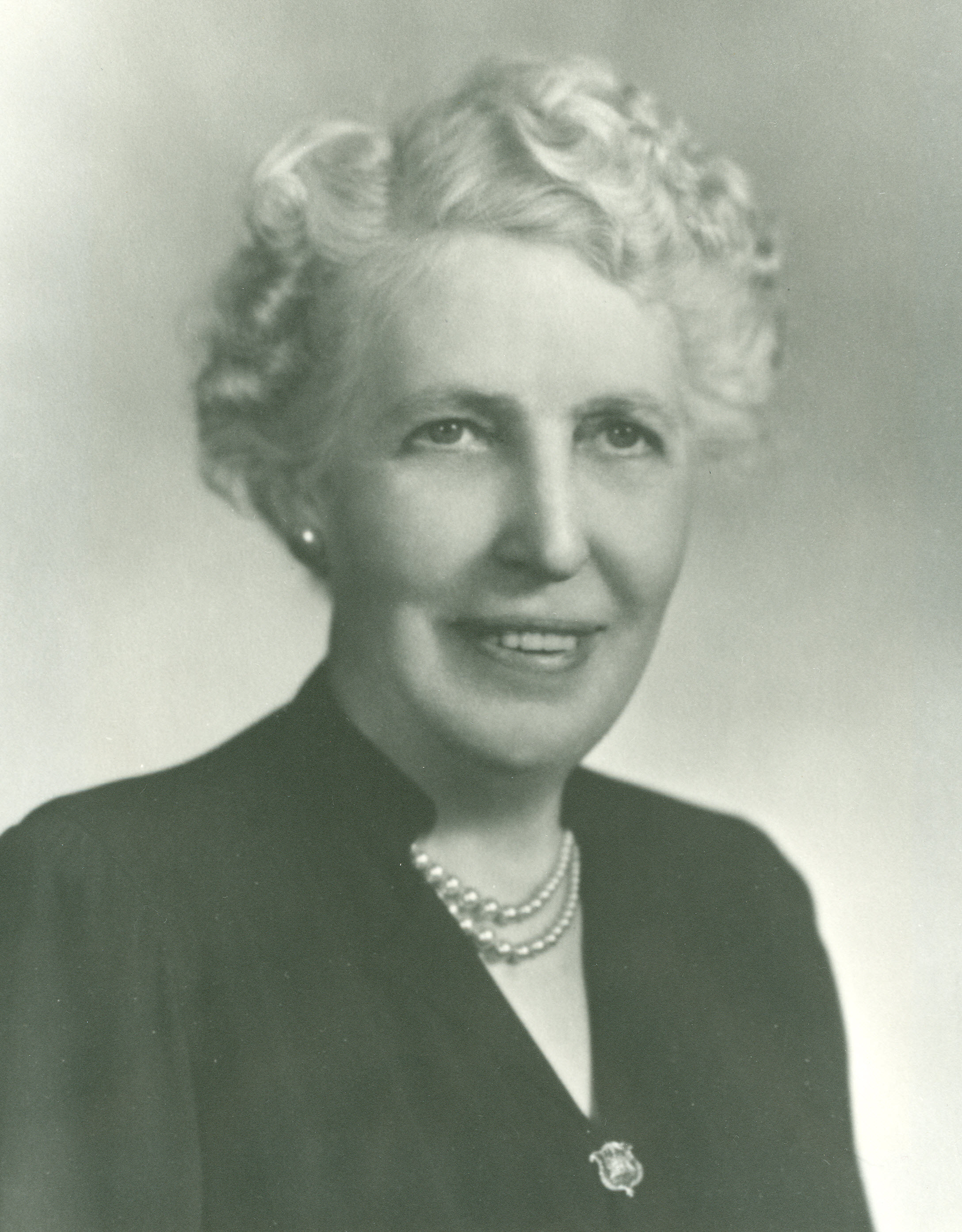
Ruth Thompson, Michigan's first woman elected to Congress

- November 1 - A jury of eight women and four men in Flint found Air Force Private Kenneth Nesbitt not guilty in a trial for the July 1949 murder of 17-year-old theater cashier Beatrice Dickerson. Her body had been found in the woods near Flint. Nesbitt had confessed three times to the crime, admitted to having lured the victim to a lover's lane and then shot her. He later repudiated his confessions and maintained his innocence. The judge appeared stunned when the verdict was read, and Michigan State Police Commissioner Donald Leonard said he was "astonished at the verdict."
- November 3 - The naked body of Dorothy Kelm, a 21-year-old mother, was found in Hickory Creek behind her home in St. Joseph. She had been strangled.
- November 7

* In the gubernatorial election, Democrat G. Mennen Williams was reelected in a close race with former governor Harry Kelly. Kelly was declared the winner on election night. A statewide recount took several weeks and showed Williams ahead when Kelly conceded on December 13 with the recount 80% complete.
* In the U. S. House of Representatives elections, incumbents were reelected in 14 of Michigan's 17 districts. The newly elected Congressmen were: Democrat Thaddeus M. Machrowicz who defeated incumbent George G. Sadowski in the Democratic primary in District 1; Republican George Meader who held District 2 after Republican Earl C. Michener retired; and Republican Ruth Thompson who held District 9 after Republican Albert J. Engel retired to run for governor. Michigan's 17 House seats remained divided at 12 Republicans and 5 Democrats. Thompson, who had previously been Michigan's first female state legislator, became the first woman elected to Congress from Michigan.
* Charline White was elected to the Michigan House of Representatives seat representing the Wayne County 1st district, becoming the first African-American woman to be elected to the Michigan Legislature.
* Ballot Proposal No. 1 passed by a two-to-one margin (895,605 to 448,125) allowing the sale of yellow margarine in Michigan.

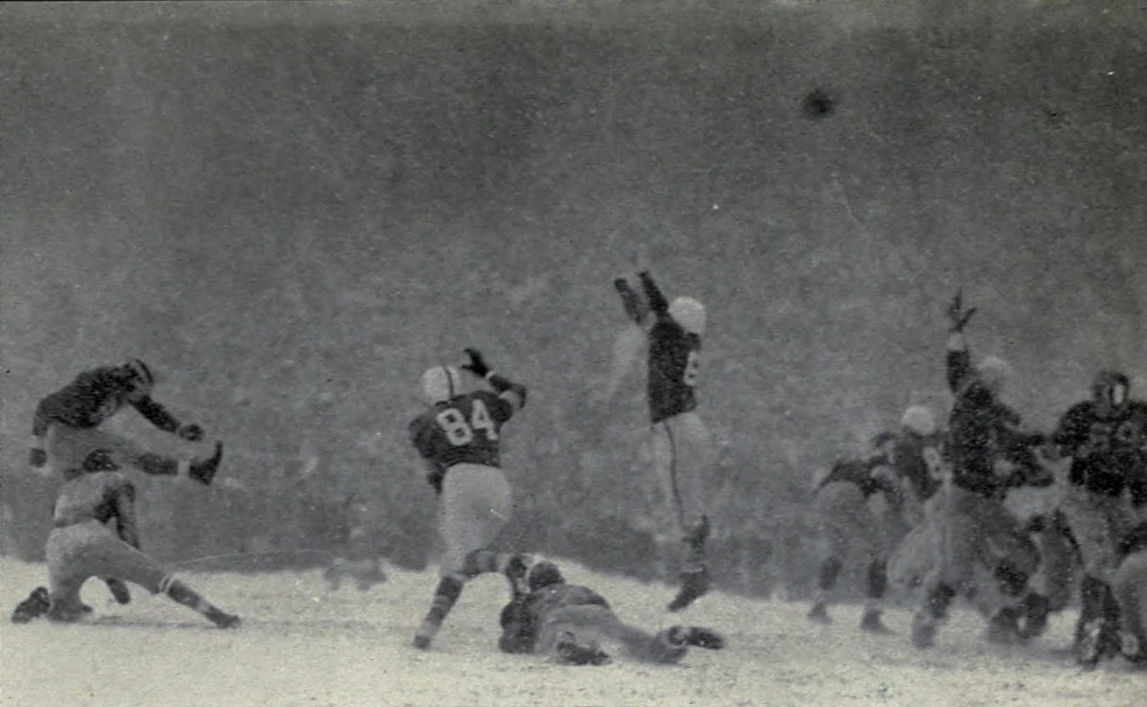
Harry Allis kicks the extra point after the Snow Bowl's only touchdown.

- November 28 - In the famous Snow Bowl game, Michigan defeated Ohio State, 9–3, in a blizzard at Ohio Stadium with temperature of 10 degrees above zero, on an icy field, and with winds gusting over 30 miles per hour. Michigan did not get a first down or complete a pass, punted 24 times, but won on a touchdown and a safety, both off blocked punts.

=== December ===
- December 3 - The body of 18-year-old Western Michigan College student Carolyn Drown was found in melting snow in a cornfield outside Kalamazoo. She had been missing for a week and had been strangled and raped. The case drew national attention.
- December 5 - General Motors and Ford announced price increases of approximately five percent on their 1951 models. Three days later, the federal government asked the nation's automobile manufacturers to reverse their price increases and freeze prices on 1951 models. The automobile companies refused to agree to the price freeze, and on December 16, the Economic Stabilization Agency ordered automobile prices immediately frozen and rolled back to December 1 levels for a period running through March 1, 1951. On December 18, General Motors suspended sales of 1951 vehicles in protest of the order.
- December 5 - Petitions with over 8,700 signatures were filed with the Dearborn City Hall seeking to recall Mayor Orville L. Hubbard. Organizers accused Hubbard of using "Gestapo tactics", hampering an audit of city books, and appointing unqualified persons as department heads. When the petitions were delivered, Hubbard held open the front door, greeted the petition organizer as the "No. 1 rat", and said, "They haven't a Chinaman's chance."
- December 8 - A gun battle between Saginaw Police and ex-convict Lawrence Nelson and his companion Sylvia Van Conant resulted in the deaths of Nelson and police officer Daniel Waters and critical injuries to two other officers. The body of auto worker, Paul Williams, also killed by Nelson, was found in the ice on Burtch Creek north of Port Huron.
- December 10 - The Detroit Lions lost the final game of the season to the Chicago Bears by a 6–3 score, finishing their season at 6-6.
- December 11 - Chrysler Corporation reached a five-year contract with the UAW which included a cost-of-living escalator clause and increased pension, insurance, and vacation benefits.
- December 12 - The University of Michigan announced that its department of epidemiology would commence an intensive effort to find a cure for polio using a five-year grant from the National Foundation for Infantile Paralysis. Less than five years later, University of Michigan researchers announced their development of an effective polio vaccine.
- December 13 - Henry Ford II announced that Ford Motor Co. would spend $1 billion on expanded production facilities over the next three years. Great Lakes Steel also announced a $42.8 million expenditure by the federal government to expand the company's Zug Island and River Rouge facilities for wartime production.
- December 15 - Buzz Fazio of Detroit's Stroh's Beer bowling team bowled a .300 game to take the lead in the 1950 world match-game singles bowling championship.
- December 17 - At the world bowling championship in Chicago, Marion Ladewig of Grand Rapids successfully defended her women's championship. Lee Jouglard of Detroit lost to Dick Hoover in the finals.
- December 19 - Bo McMillin resigned under fire as head coach and general manager of the Detroit Lions. One day later, Buddy Parker was hired as the Lions' new head coach. He remained in the position for six years and led the team to NFL championships in 1952 and 1953.
- December 21 - Chrysler Corp. announced plans to build a $20 million engine plant in Trenton, Michigan.
- December 22 - General Motors and Chrysler Corp. announced defense contracts totaling $260 million to build medium tanks (Chrysler, $160 million) and military vehicles (GM, $100 million).
- December 26 - General Motors' CEO Charles Erwin Wilson announced a contract to produce Republic F-84 Thunderjet fighter planes.
- December 27 - Michigan manufacturers won defense contracts for Oldsmobile to produce 3.5 inch rockets for a new "super bazooka" and for Fruehauf Trailer Co. to produce 35,000 all-purpose cargo trailers.
- December 28 - Chuck Baer resigned as head coach of the Detroit Titans football team. He had served in the position for six years, compiling a 35–21–1 record.
- December 31 - New Year's Eve celebrations in Detroit included performances by the Gene Krupa and Claude Thornhill bands at Lawrence Tech's gala carnival at the Michigan State Fairgrounds and by Anita O'Day at the Flame Show Bar.

== Births ==
- February 6 - Paul Gentilozzi, race car driver, in Lansing
- February 6 - Paul Seymour, All-American football tight end, in Detroit
- February 18 - John Hughes, filmmaker (Sixteen Candles, The Breakfast Club, Ferris Bueller's Day Off), in East Lansing
- March 1 - Dave Marsh, music critic, in Detroit
- April 4 - Christine Lahti, actress (Swing Shift, Chicago Hope), in Birmingham
- April 29 - Debbie Stabenow, U.S. senator, in Gladwin
- May 1 - Dann Florek, actor (Law & Order and Law & Order: Special Victims Unit), in Flat Rock
- May 13 - Stevie Wonder, musician, singer, and songwriter, in Saginaw
- June 3 - Suzi Quatro, rock singer-songwriter and actress (Happy Days), in Detroit
- June 4 - George Noory, radio talk show host, in Detroit
- June 19 - Jim Brandstatter, sportcaster, in East Lansing
- July 19 - Dick Posthumus, former Michigan lieutenant governor and Republican candidate for governor, in Alto
- July 27 - Reggie McKenzie, American football lineman and College Football Hall of Fame inductee, in Detroit
- October 14 - Sheila Young, speed skater and Olympic gold medalist, in Birmingham
- December 23 - Geoffrey Fieger, attorney for Jack Kevorkian and candidate for governor, in Detroit

== Deaths ==
- January 3 - John Weatherspoon Maxwell, known as "Detroit's favorite doorman," a native of Scotland with a rich brogue and "luxuriant guardsman's mustache" that had been featured in advertisements, in Detroit
- January 11 - Walter A. Maier, theologian and host of the International Lutheran Radio Hour, in St. Louis, Missouri, at age 56
- January 26 - Frank F. Holznagle, florist, move to Highland Park in 1886 and served as village president in the early 1900s, in Birmingham at age 88
- January 29 - Theodore Schroeder, curator of the Detroit Zoo from its founding in 1928 until 1941 and trainer of the chimpanzee Jo Mendi, in Highland Park General Hospital at age 68
- February 6 - John C. Lodge, former mayor of Detroit, in Detroit at age 87
- February 6 - Nicholas X. Karay, one of the founders of Detroit's Greektown community who settled there in 1900, in Detroit at age 95
- February 7 - William Murphy, Roman Catholic Bishop of Saginaw since 1938, in Saginaw at age 64
- February 8 - Lynn McNaughton, automobile pioneer with Cadillac from 1904 to 1930, in Detroit at age 67
- February 11 - Kiki Cuyler, Baseball Hall of Fame inductee, in an ambulance en route from his home in Harrisville to Ann Arbor at age 51
- February 22 - Alonzo P. Ewing, founder of one of Detroit's first automobile finance companies and civic leader, in Detroit at age 75
- March 3 - Alice Crocker Lloyd, University of Michigan's dean of women since 1930, in Ann Arbor at age 57
- March 7 - Frank M. Sparks, publisher of the Grand Rapids Herald 1928 to 1947, at age 73
- March 8 - William P. Rutledge, former Detroit police commissioner responsible for numerous traffic control and policing innovations, including one-way streets, traffic towers, and stop signs, and the development of radio-equipped cars and the first police training school, in St. Petersburg, Florida, at age 80
- March 8 - John Bodenstab, leader of Prohibition repeal movement, advocate of bar owners, brewers, and liquor manufacturers, in Detroit at age 79
- April 2 - Edward Jeffries, former mayor of Detroit, in Miami Beach at age 49
- May 27 - John Lesinski Sr., Congressman and president of the Polish Citizens’ Committee of Detroit, in Dearborn at age 65
- June 13 - Jesse Binga, African-American banker born and raised in Detroit, in Chicago at age 87
- June 15 - Thomas S. Hammond, scored 163 points on 15 touchdowns (worth five points), 63 goals after touchdown (worth one point), and five goals from field (worth five points) for Michigan's 1903 "Point-a-Minute" football team, in Chicago at age 66
- July 1 - Eliel Saarinen, architect who designed Cranbrook, in Bloomfield Hills at age 77
- August 4 - Harry Coveleski, Major League Baseball pitcher who won 65 games for the Detroit Tigers in three years from 1914 to 1916, at age 64 in Shamokin, Pennsylvania
- August 26 - Ransom E. Olds, automobile pioneer and namesake of the Oldsmobile and REO automobile brands, in Lansing at age 86
- September 29 - Clara Bryant Ford, widow of Henry Ford who called her "The Believer", at age 86 at Henry Ford Hospital in Detroit
- September 19 - Harry P. Guy, ragtime composer, in Detroit at age 80
- October 31 - Frank Couzens, former mayor of Detroit and chairman of Wabeek State Bank, in Detroit at age 48
- December 9 - Alexander S. Ramage, a chemist who held 75 patents, many important to the automotive, aviation, and petroleum industries, in Detroit at age 86
- December 27 - Newton A. "Woody" Woodworth, founder and former president of Ex-Cell-O Corp., in Detroit at age 62
- December 30 - Louis C. Sabin, former superintendent of the Soo Locks and namesake of the Sabin Lock, in Cleveland Heights, Ohio, at age 83

== See also ==
- History of Michigan
- History of Detroit
