= 1950 Washington University Bears football team =

American college football season

1950 Washington University Bears football
- Conference: Independent
- Record: 2–7
- Head coach: Irwin Uteritz (2nd season)
- Home stadium: Francis Field

1950 Midwestern college football independents records
	Conf.			Overall
Team	W	L	T	W		L		T
Valparaiso		–		9	–	1	–	0
No. 8 Michigan State		–		8	–	1	–	0
Xavier		–		8	–	1	–	0
John Carroll		–		8	–	2	–	0
Baldwin–Wallace		–		5	–	2	–	1
Michigan Tech		–		4	–	2	–	1
Marquette		–		5	–	3	–	1
Wabash		–		4	–	2	–	3
Butler		–		4	–	4	–	1
Notre Dame		–		4	–	4	–	1
Toledo		–		4	–	5	–	0
Bowling Green		–		3	–	4	–	2
Dayton		–		4	–	6	–	0
Youngstown		–		3	–	5	–	0
Ball State		–		2	–	4	–	1
Washington University		–		2	–	7	–	0
Wayne		–		2	–	7	–	0
Indiana State		–		1	–	7	–	1
Rose Poly		–		0	–	8	–	0
Rankings from AP Poll

The 1950 Washington University Bears football team represented Washington University in St. Louis as an independent during the 1950 college football season. Led by second-year head coach Irwin Uteritz, the Bears compiled a record of 2–7. Washington University played home games at Francis Field in St. Louis.

== Schedule ==
Date	Time	Opponent	Site	Result	Attendance	Source
September 23	2:00 p.m.	Missouri Mines	Francis Field; St. Louis, MO	L 19–34	8,000	
September 30	7:15 p.m.	at Western Reserve	Shaw Stadium; East Cleveland, OH	L 20–24	5,684	
October 7	2:00 p.m.	Illinois Wesleyan	Francis Field; St. Louis, MO	W 24–7	1,000	
October 14	2:00 p.m.	at Memphis State	Crump Stadium; Memphis, TN	L 0–54	3,559	
October 21	2:00 p.m.	Western Michigan^{†}	Francis Field; St. Louis, MO	L 7–26	7,500	
November 4	2:00 p.m.	Louisville	Francis Field; St. Louis, MO	L 7–28	3,750	
November 11	1:30 p.m.	at Butler	Butler Bowl; Indianapolis, IN	L 20–25	2,488	
November 18	2:00 p.m.	Southeast Missouri State	Francis Field; St. Louis, MO	W 6–0	3,500	
November 25		at Sewanee	Hardee Field; Sewanee, TN	L 0–7		
^{†}Homecoming; All times are in Central time
