= 1950 Marquette Hilltoppers football team =

American college football season

1950 Marquette Hilltoppers football
- Conference: Independent
- Record: 5–3–1
- Head coach: Lisle Blackbourn (1st season)
- Home stadium: Marquette Stadium

1950 Midwestern college football independents records
| | Conf. | | | Overall |
| Team | W | L | T | W | | L | | T |
|---|---|---|---|---|---|---|---|---|
| Valparaiso | | – | | 9 | – | 1 | – | 0 |
| No. 8 Michigan State | | – | | 8 | – | 1 | – | 0 |
| Xavier | | – | | 8 | – | 1 | – | 0 |
| John Carroll | | – | | 8 | – | 2 | – | 0 |
| Baldwin–Wallace | | – | | 5 | – | 2 | – | 1 |
| Michigan Tech | | – | | 4 | – | 2 | – | 1 |
| Marquette | | – | | 5 | – | 3 | – | 1 |
| Wabash | | – | | 4 | – | 2 | – | 3 |
| Butler | | – | | 4 | – | 4 | – | 1 |
| Notre Dame | | – | | 4 | – | 4 | – | 1 |
| Toledo | | – | | 4 | – | 5 | – | 0 |
| Bowling Green | | – | | 3 | – | 4 | – | 2 |
| Dayton | | – | | 4 | – | 6 | – | 0 |
| Youngstown | | – | | 3 | – | 5 | – | 0 |
| Ball State | | – | | 2 | – | 4 | – | 1 |
| Washington University | | – | | 2 | – | 7 | – | 0 |
| Wayne | | – | | 2 | – | 7 | – | 0 |
| Indiana State | | – | | 1 | – | 7 | – | 1 |
| Rose Poly | | – | | 0 | – | 8 | – | 0 |
Rankings from AP Poll

The 1950 Marquette Hilltoppers football team was an American football team that represented Marquette University as an independent during the 1950 college football season. In its first season under head coach Lisle Blackbourn, the team compiled a 5–3–1 record and outscored all opponents by a total of 204 to 145. The team played its home games at Marquette Stadium in Milwaukee.

== Schedule ==
| Date | Opponent | Site | Result | Attendance | Source |
|---|---|---|---|---|---|
| September 23 | North Dakota State | Marquette Stadium; Milwaukee, WI | W 57–0 | | |
| September 30 | at Wisconsin | Camp Randall Stadium; Madison, WI | L 6–28 | 45,000 | |
| October 7 | Kansas State | Marquette Stadium; Milwaukee, WI | W 46–6 | | |
| October 13 | at Detroit | University of Detroit Stadium; Detroit, MI | W 27–13 | 12,356 | |
| October 21 | at Michigan State | Macklin Stadium; East Lansing, MI | L 6–34 | 29,029 | |
| October 28 | Santa Clara | Marquette Stadium; Milwaukee, WI | W 21–14 | 14,000 | |
| November 3 | at South Carolina | Carolina Stadium; Columbia, SC | T 13–13 | 14,000 | |
| November 11 | Holy Cross | Marquette Stadium; Milwaukee, WI | W 21–19 | 16,500 | |
| November 18 | at Indiana | Memorial Stadium; Bloomington, IN | L 7–18 | | |
