= 1950 Marshall Thundering Herd football team =

American college football season

1950 Marshall Thundering Herd football
- Conference: Ohio Valley Conference
- Record: 2–8 (2–4 OVC)
- Head coach: Pete Pederson (1st season)
- Captain: Earl Sang
- Home stadium: Fairfield Stadium

1950 Ohio Valley Conference football standings
	Conf.					Overall
Team	W		L		T	W		L		T
Murray State $	5	–	0	–	1	7	–	2	–	1
Western Kentucky	3	–	1	–	2	6	–	2	–	2
Eastern Kentucky	4	–	2	–	0	6	–	4	–	0
Morehead State	3	–	3	–	0	4	–	4	–	0
Marshall	2	–	4	–	0	2	–	8	–	0
Evansville	1	–	4	–	1	3	–	6	–	1
Tennessee Tech	1	–	5	–	0	4	–	7	–	0
$ – Conference champion

The 1950 Marshall Thundering Herd football team was an American football team that represented Marshall University in the Ohio Valley Conference (OVC) during the 1950 college football season. In its first season under head coach Pete Pederson, the team compiled a 2–8 record (1–4 against conference opponents) and was outscored by a total of 249 to 107. Earl Sang was the team captain. The team played its home games at Fairfield Stadium in Huntington, West Virginia.

== Schedule ==
Date	Opponent	Site	Result	Attendance	Source
September 23	Morehead State	Fairfield Stadium; Huntington, WV	L 6–51		
September 30	Eastern Kentucky	Fairfield Stadium; Huntington, WV	L 0–34		
October 7	at Western Kentucky	Bowling Green, KY	W 47–13		
October 14	at Murray State	Murray, KY	L 0–14		
October 21	Youngstown*	Fairfield Stadium; Huntington, WV	L 13–28		
October 28	John Carroll^{†}*	Fairfield Stadium; Huntington, WV	L 2–39	8,000	
November 4	Tennessee Tech	Fairfield Stadium; Huntington, WV	W 13–0		
November 11	at Evansville	Evansville, IN	L 14–21		
November 18	at Dayton*	UD Stadium; Dayton, OH	L 6–35		
November 23	at Ohio*	Peden Stadium; Athens, OH	L 6–14		
*Non-conference game; ^{†}Homecoming
