= Lou Zontini =

American football player (1917–1986)

Profile
- Positions: Fullback, halfback

Personal information
- Born: August 30, 1917; Whitesville, West Virginia
- Died: August 6, 1986 (aged 68); Richmond Heights, Ohio
- Listed height: 5 ft 9 in (1.75 m)
- Listed weight: 189 lb (86 kg)

Career information
- College: Notre Dame

Career history
- Chicago Cardinals (1940-1941); Cleveland Rams (1944); Fleet City Bluejackets (1945); Buffalo Bisons (1946)
- Stats at Pro Football Reference

Louis Rogers "Red" Zontini (August 30, 1917 – August 6, 1986) was an American football fullback and halfback.

Zontini was born in Whitesville, West Virginia, in 1917 and attended Sherman High School in Seth, West Virginia. He played college football for Notre Dame from 1937 to 1939.

Zontini played professional football in the National Football League for the Chicago Cardinals from 1940 to 1941 and the Cleveland Rams in 1944, and in the All-America Football Conference for the Buffalo Bisons in 1946. He appeared in a total of 40 professional games, six of them as a starter. He tallied 133 rushing yards and 110 receiving yards and scored four touchdowns. He also kicked nine field goals (out of 23 attempts) and 59 extra points (out of 64 attempts).

Zontini served in the Navy in 1945 and was a member of the undefeated 1945 Fleet City Bluejackets football team.

He was hired as an assistant football coach at Western Reserve University in 1948, and was appointed as a full-time assistant coach in 1950.

He died in 1986 in Richmond Heights, Ohio, and was buried at All Souls Cemetery in Chardon, Ohio.
