= Richard W. Luther =

American college football player and coach (1919–2001)

Dick Luther
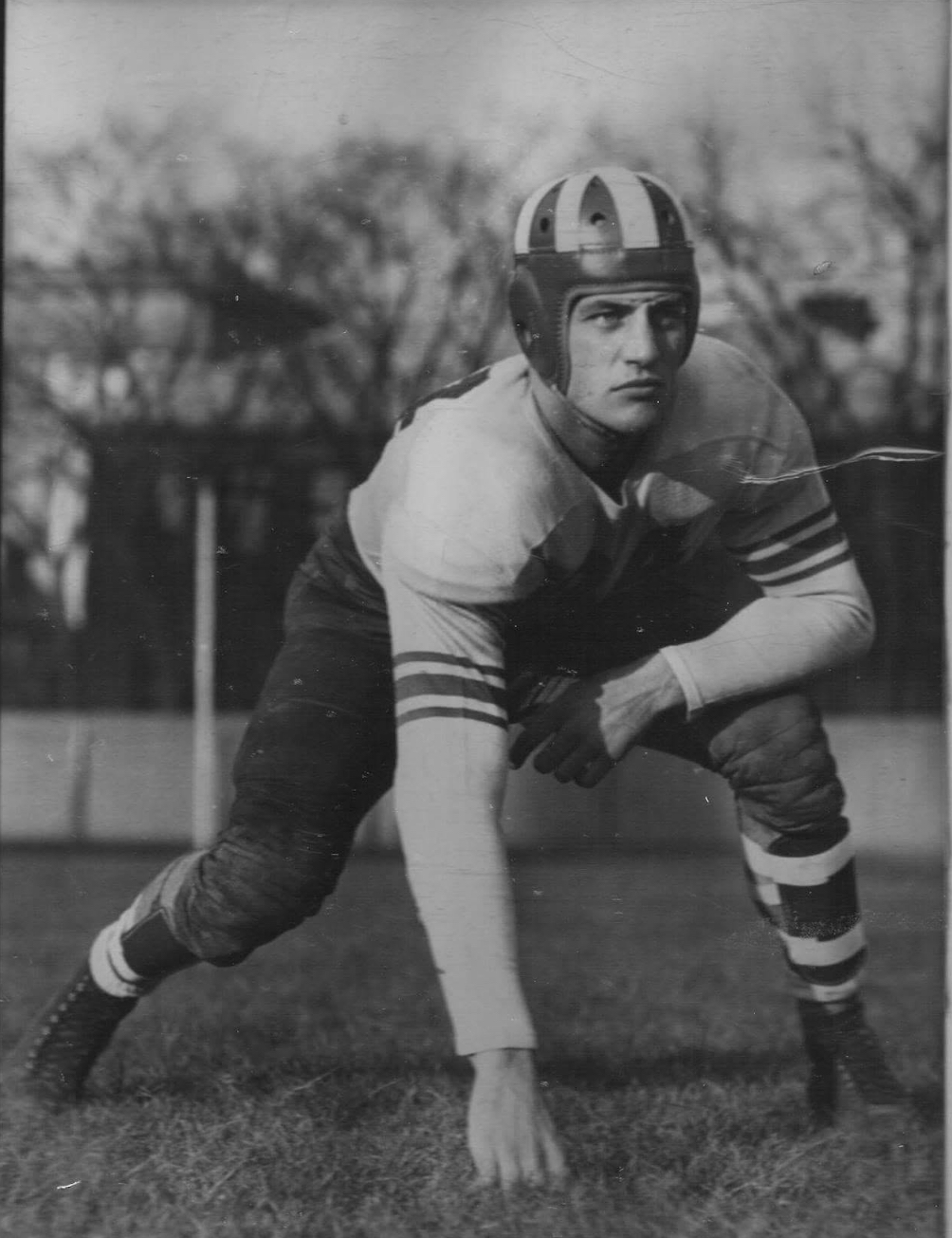
- Luther in 1939

Biographical details
- Born: November 21, 1919
- Died: July 10, 2001 (aged 81)

Playing career
- 1938–1941: Western Reserve
- Position: Tackle

Coaching career (HC unless noted)
- 1942, 1946–1947: Western Reserve (assistant)
- 1947: Western Reserve
- 1948–1949: Western Reserve (assistant)
- 1950: Western Reserve

Head coaching record
- Overall: 5–9

Richard William Luther (November 11, 1919 – July 10, 2001) was an American college football player and coach at Western Reserve University, known today as Case Western Reserve University. He was later inducted into the school's varsity hall of fame on April 18, 1980. During World War II, Luther attended Midshipmen's school at the University of Notre Dame, ranking as a Lt. Senior Grade while in the United States Navy.

== Playing career ==
In high school, Luther was a three-year star football player at John Adams High School in Cleveland, Ohio.

For college, Luther played tackle for the Western Reserve Red Cats and was a member of the team that won the 1941 Sun Bowl.

== Coaching career ==
In 1942, Luther began coaching as an assistant football coach for his alma mater, Western Reserve, before leaving for three years to serve in the United States Navy during World War II. He returned to Western Reserve in 1946 and served again an assistant coach. During the 1947 season, head coach Tom Davies was fired after five games, and Luther was named head coach, finishing the season out at a 3–1 record. He returned to being an assistant coach for the 1948 and 1949 seasons with the hiring of former Cleveland Browns player Mike Scarry, until again he named as the head coach for the 1950 season.

== Later years ==
Luther moved to Michigan in 1952 and began working for General Motors Institute in Flint, where he was director of management and organization development retiring in 1981.

Luther died July 10, 2001, and is buried in Flushing City Cemetery in Flushing, Michigan.

== Head coaching record ==
Year	Team	Overall	Conference	Standing	Bowl/playoffs
Western Reserve (Mid-American Conference) (1947)
1947	Western Reserve	3–1	1–1	2nd	
Western Reserve (Mid-American Conference) (1950)
1950	Western Reserve	2–8	1–3	T–4th	
Western Reserve:		5–9	2–4		
Total:		5–9			
