= 1950 Michigan State Spartans football team =

American college football season

1950 Michigan State Spartans football
- Conference: Independent

Ranking
- Coaches: No. 9
- AP: No. 8
- Record: 8–1
- Head coach: Biggie Munn (4th season)
- MVP: Sonny Grandelius
- Captain: LeRoy R. Crane
- Home stadium: Macklin Stadium

1950 Midwestern college football independents records
	Conf.			Overall
Team	W	L	T	W		L		T
Valparaiso		–		9	–	1	–	0
No. 8 Michigan State		–		8	–	1	–	0
Xavier		–		8	–	1	–	0
John Carroll		–		8	–	2	–	0
Baldwin–Wallace		–		5	–	2	–	1
Michigan Tech		–		4	–	2	–	1
Marquette		–		5	–	3	–	1
Wabash		–		4	–	2	–	3
Butler		–		4	–	4	–	1
Notre Dame		–		4	–	4	–	1
Toledo		–		4	–	5	–	0
Bowling Green		–		3	–	4	–	2
Dayton		–		4	–	6	–	0
Youngstown		–		3	–	5	–	0
Ball State		–		2	–	4	–	1
Washington University		–		2	–	7	–	0
Wayne		–		2	–	7	–	0
Indiana State		–		1	–	7	–	1
Rose Poly		–		0	–	8	–	0
Rankings from AP Poll

The 1950 Michigan State Spartans football team was an American football team that represented Michigan State College (now known as Michigan State University) as an independent during the 1950 college football season. In their fourth season under head coach Biggie Munn, the Spartans compiled an 8–1 record, outscored opponents by a total of 243 to 107, and were ranked No. 8 in the final AP poll.

The 1950 Spartans won their annual rivalry games against Notre Dame (36–33) and Michigan (14–7). In intersectional play, they beat Oregon State (6–0), William & Mary (33–14), and Pittsburgh (19–0), but lost to Maryland (34–7).

On offense, the Spartans tallied 3,227 yards of total offense, consisting of 2.424 rushing yards (269.3 per game) and 803 passing yards (89.2 per game). On defense, they gave up 1,951 yards consisting of 874 rushing yards (97.1 per game) and 1,077 passing yards (119.7 per game). The individual statistical leaders included:

- Fullback Sonny Grandelius tallied 1,023 rushing yards on 163 carries for an average of 6.2 yards per carry. Grandelius received first-team All-America honors from the Associated Press, International News Service, and Central Press.
- Quarterback Al Dorow completed 45 of 105 passes (.429 completion percentage) for 654 yards with nine interceptions.
- End Bob Carey tallied 19 receptions for 268 yards, three touchdowns, and an average of 13.1 yards per reception.

End Dorne Dibble also received first-team All-America honors from the Football Writers Association of America.

The team played its home games at Macklin Stadium in East Lansing, Michigan.

== Schedule ==
Date	Opponent	Rank	Site	Result	Attendance	Source
September 23	Oregon State	No. 19	Macklin Stadium; East Lansing, MI	W 38–13	32,500	
September 30	at No. 3 Michigan	No. 19	Michigan Stadium; Ann Arbor, MI (rivalry)	W 14–7	97,239	
October 7	Maryland	No. 2	Macklin Stadium; East Lansing, MI	L 7–34	39,376	
October 14	William & Mary^{†}	No. 20	Macklin Stadium; East Lansing, MI	W 33–14	35,656	
October 21	Marquette		Macklin Stadium; East Lansing, MI	W 34–6	29,029	
October 28	at Notre Dame	No. 15	Notre Dame Stadium; Notre Dame, IN (rivalry)	W 36–33	57,866	
November 4	Indiana	No. 13	Macklin Stadium; East Lansing, MI (rivalry)	W 35–0	45,237	
November 11	Minnesota	No. 12	Macklin Stadium; East Lansing, MI	W 27–0	47,361	
November 18	at Pittsburgh	No. 10	Pitt Stadium; Pittsburgh, PA	W 19–0	28,679	
^{†}Homecoming; Rankings from AP Poll released prior to the game

== Game summaries ==
=== Michigan ===
Week 1: Michigan State at Michigan

Team	1	2	3	4	Total
• Michigan St.	7	0	0	7	14
Michigan	0	0	7	0	7

- Date: September 30, 1950
- Location: Michigan Stadium
  Ann Arbor, MI
- Game attendance: 97,239

Michigan, ranked No. 3 in the country, opened the 1950 season playing against Michigan State College in Ann Arbor. Though favored by two touchdowns, the Wolverines were upset by the Spartans 14–7. The defeat was Michigan's first loss in the opening game of a season since 1937. Michigan played most of the game without its leading player, Chuck Ortmann. Ortmann was injured while being tackled on a 35-yard kickoff return in the first quarter. On the next play, Ortmann dropped back to pass but fell to the ground and was unable to return to the game. Michigan State took a 7–0 lead in the first quarter on a touchdown run by Sonny Grandelius. Michigan tied the score in the third quarter on a touchdown pass from Don Peterson to Fred Pickard. Michigan's touchdown was set up when Frank Howell intercepted a Michigan State pass and returned it 32 yards to the Michigan State 20-yard line. In the fourth quarter, Michigan State returned a punt to the Michigan 19-yard line and scored on a run by Michigan State fullback Leroy Crane. Michigan drove to the Michigan State 10-yard line in the fourth quarter, but the drive ended when quarterback Bill Putich threw an interception.

== See also ==
- 1950 in Michigan
