= 1950 Western Michigan Broncos football team =

American college football season

1950 Western Michigan Broncos football
- Conference: Mid-American Conference
- Record: 5–4 (0–4 MAC)
- Head coach: John Gill (9th season)
- MVP: Bill Zabonick
- Captains: Pat Clysdale; Bill Zabonick
- Home stadium: Waldo Stadium

1950 Mid-American Conference football standings
	Conf.					Overall
Team	W		L		T	W		L		T
Miami (OH) $	4	–	0	–	0	9	–	1	–	0
Cincinnati	3	–	1	–	0	8	–	4	–	0
Ohio	2	–	2	–	0	6	–	4	–	0
Western Reserve	1	–	3	–	0	2	–	8	–	0
Western Michigan	1	–	3	–	0	5	–	4	–	0
$ – Conference champion

The 1950 Western Michigan Broncos football team represented Michigan College of Education (later renamed Western Michigan University) in the Mid-American Conference (MAC) during the 1950 college football season. In their ninth season under head coach John Gill, the Broncos compiled a 5–4 record (0–4 against MAC opponents), finished in fifth place in the MAC, and outscored their opponents, 188 to 163. The team played its home games at Waldo Stadium in Kalamazoo, Michigan.

End Pat Clysdale and defensive end Bill Zabonick were the team captains. Zabonick also received the team's most outstanding player award.

== Schedule ==
Date	Time	Opponent	Site	Result	Attendance	Source
September 23		Northern Illinois*	Waldo Stadium; Kalamazoo, MI	W 40–13	8,000	
September 30		Central Michigan*	Waldo Stadium; Kalamazoo, MI (rivalry)	W 21–13	6,000	
October 7		Toledo*	Waldo Stadium; Kalamazoo, MI	W 54–19		
October 14		at Miami (OH)	Miami Field; Oxford, OH	L 0–35	8,145	
October 21	2:00 p.m.	at Washington University*	Francis Field; St. Louis, MO	W 26–7	7,500	
October 28		Cincinnati	Waldo Stadium; Kalamazoo, MI	L 6–27		
November 4	2:00 p.m.	Butler*^{†}	Waldo Stadium; Kalamazoo, MI	W 34–13	5,000	
November 11		Western Reserve	Waldo Stadium; Kalamazoo, MI	L 0–26		
November 18		at Ohio	Peden Stadium; Athens, OH	L 7–10		
*Non-conference game; ^{†}Homecoming; All times are in Central time

== See also ==
- 1950 in Michigan
