= 1950 Toledo Rockets football team =

American college football season

1950 Toledo Rockets football
- Conference: Independent
- Record: 4–5
- Head coach: Bob Snyder (1st season)
- Home stadium: Glass Bowl

1950 Midwestern college football independents records
	Conf.			Overall
Team	W	L	T	W		L		T
Valparaiso		–		9	–	1	–	0
No. 8 Michigan State		–		8	–	1	–	0
Xavier		–		8	–	1	–	0
John Carroll		–		8	–	2	–	0
Baldwin–Wallace		–		5	–	2	–	1
Michigan Tech		–		4	–	2	–	1
Marquette		–		5	–	3	–	1
Wabash		–		4	–	2	–	3
Butler		–		4	–	4	–	1
Notre Dame		–		4	–	4	–	1
Toledo		–		4	–	5	–	0
Bowling Green		–		3	–	4	–	2
Dayton		–		4	–	6	–	0
Youngstown		–		3	–	5	–	0
Ball State		–		2	–	4	–	1
Washington University		–		2	–	7	–	0
Wayne		–		2	–	7	–	0
Indiana State		–		1	–	7	–	1
Rose Poly		–		0	–	8	–	0
Rankings from AP Poll

The 1950 Toledo Rockets football team was an American football team that represented Toledo University during the 1950 college football season. In their first and only season under head coach Bob Snyder, the Rockets compiled a 4–5 record and were outscored by their opponents by a combined total of 234 to 200.

== Schedule ==
Date	Opponent	Site	Result	Attendance	Source
September 24	Pittsburg State	Glass Bowl; Toledo, OH	W 32–14		
September 30	John Carroll	Glass Bowl; Toledo, OH	L 0–41		
October 7	at Western Michigan	Waldo Stadium; Kalamazoo, MI	L 19–54		
October 14	Dayton	Glass Bowl; Toledo, OH	L 13–14		
October 21	at Bradley	Peoria Stadium; Peoria, IL	W 32–20		
October 28	Bowling Green	Glass Bowl; Toledo, OH (rivalry)	L 14–39		
November 4	Western Reserve	Glass Bowl; Toledo, OH	W 27–7		
November 11	at St. Bonaventure	Forness Stadium; Olean, NY	L 7–38	6,500	
November 17	Wayne	Glass Bowl; Toledo, OH	W 56–7		
