= Michigan Tech Huskies football, 1950–1959 =

American college football seasons

1950–1959 Michigan Tech Huskies football
- Conference: Independent (1951–1957); Northern State College Conference (1958–1959)
- Head coach: Alan Bovard (1947–1956); Omer LaJeunesse (1957–1962)

The Michigan Tech Huskies football program, 1950–1959 represented the Michigan College of Mines and Technology (now known as Michigan Technological University) as an independent team during the 1930s.

Alan Bovard was the head coach from 1947 to 1956, and Omer LaJeunesse held the post from 1957 to 1962. Both had played football at the University of Michigan in the early 1930s.

== 1950 ==
1950 Michigan Tech Huskies football
- Conference: Independent
- Record: 4–2–1
- Head coach: Alan Bovard (4th season)

1950 Midwestern college football independents records
	Conf.			Overall
Team	W	L	T	W		L		T
Valparaiso		–		9	–	1	–	0
No. 8 Michigan State		–		8	–	1	–	0
Xavier		–		8	–	1	–	0
John Carroll		–		8	–	2	–	0
Baldwin–Wallace		–		5	–	2	–	1
Michigan Tech		–		4	–	2	–	1
Marquette		–		5	–	3	–	1
Wabash		–		4	–	2	–	3
Butler		–		4	–	4	–	1
Notre Dame		–		4	–	4	–	1
Toledo		–		4	–	5	–	0
Bowling Green		–		3	–	4	–	2
Dayton		–		4	–	6	–	0
Youngstown		–		3	–	5	–	0
Ball State		–		2	–	4	–	1
Washington University		–		2	–	7	–	0
Wayne		–		2	–	7	–	0
Indiana State		–		1	–	7	–	1
Rose Poly		–		0	–	8	–	0
Rankings from AP Poll

The 1950 Michigan Tech Huskies football team, sometimes referred to as the Michigan Tech Engineers, represented the Michigan College of Mines and Technology (now known as Michigan Technological University) as an independent during the 1950 college football season. In their fourth year under head coach Alan Bovard, the team compiled a 4–2–1 record.

Michigan Tech halfback Jim Lahr led the state in scoring with 85 points scored.

=== Schedule ===
Date	Opponent	Site	Result	Attendance	Source
September 23	Stevens Point State	Houghton, MI	T 6–6		
September 30	at Albion	Albion, MI	L 13–14		
October 7	at Ferris Institute	Big Rapids, MI	W 20–6		
October 14	Detroit Tech	Houghton, MI	W 40–7		
October 21	Northern Michigan	Houghton, MI	W 26–0	2,500	
October 28	Northland (WI)	Houghton, MI	W 48–0		
November 4	Macalester		L 6–7		

== 1951 ==
1951 Michigan Tech Huskies football
- Conference: Independent
- Record: 4–2–1
- Head coach: Alan Bovard (5th season)

1951 Midwestern college football independents records
	Conf.			Overall
Team	W	L	T	W		L		T
No. 2 Michigan State		–		9	–	0	–	0
Xavier		–		9	–	0	–	1
Wabash		–		7	–	0	–	1
No. 13 Notre Dame		–		7	–	2	–	1
Dayton		–		7	–	3	–	0
Michigan Tech		–		4	–	2	–	1
Toledo		–		6	–	4	–	0
Washington University		–		5	–	4	–	0
Wayne		–		5	–	4	–	0
Bowling Green		–		4	–	4	–	1
Marquette		–		4	–	6	–	1
Baldwin–Wallace		–		3	–	5	–	0
John Carroll		–		3	–	6	–	0
Rose Poly		–		2	–	5	–	0
Youngstown		–		2	–	6	–	1
Rankings from AP Poll

The 1951 Michigan Tech Huskies football team, sometimes referred to as the Michigan Tech Engineers, represented the Michigan College of Mines and Technology (now known as Michigan Technological University) as an independent during the 1951 college football season. In their fifth year under head coach Alan Bovard, the team compiled a 4–2–1 record.

=== Schedule ===
Date	Opponent	Site	Result	Attendance	Source
September 21	at Stevens Point State	Stevens Point, WI	T 13–13		
September 29	vs. Alma	Calumet, MI	W 19–6		
October 5	at Western Illinois	Hanson Field; Macomb, IL	L 0–35		
October 13	Ferris Institute		W 31–6		
October 20	at Northern Michigan		W 31–6		
October 27	St. Cloud State	Hougton, MI	W 14–0		
November 3	at Wheaton (IL)	Wheaton, IL	L 0–18		

== 1952 ==
1952 Michigan Tech Huskies football
- Conference: Independent
- Record: 6–1
- Head coach: Alan Bovard (6th season)

1952 Midwestern college football independents records
	Conf.			Overall
Team	W	L	T	W		L		T
No. 1 Michigan State		–		9	–	0	–	0
Michigan Tech		–		6	–	1	–	0
No. 3 Notre Dame		–		7	–	2	–	1
Carthage		–		5	–	2	–	0
Youngstown		–		4	–	3	–	1
Wabash		–		5	–	4	–	0
Dayton		–		6	–	5	–	0
Baldwin–Wallace		–		4	–	4	–	0
Wayne		–		4	–	4	–	0
Bradley		–		4	–	5	–	0
John Carroll		–		4	–	5	–	0
Washington University		–		4	–	5	–	0
Rose Poly		–		3	–	4	–	1
Xavier		–		4	–	6	–	0
Marquette		–		3	–	5	–	1
Drake		–		2	–	7	–	0
Rankings from AP Poll

The 1952 Michigan Tech Huskies football team, sometimes referred to as the Michigan Tech Engineers, represented the Michigan College of Mines and Technology (now known as Michigan Technological University) as an independent during the 1952 college football season. In their sixth year under head coach Alan Bovard, the team compiled a 6–1 record.

=== Schedule ===
Date	Opponent	Site	Result	Attendance	Source
September 20	Stevens Point State	Houghton, MI	L 0–13		
September 27	at Northland (WI)	Ashland, WI	W 27–13		
October 4	Albion	Houghton, MI	W 21–0		
October 11	Minnesota–Duluth	Houghton, MI	W 35–7		
October 18	Northern Michigan	Houghton, MI	W 21–0		
November 1	at Superior State	Superior, WI	W 12–6		
November 8	Ferris Institute		W 27–6		

== 1953 ==
1953 Michigan Tech Huskies football
- Conference: Independent
- Record: 2–5
- Head coach: Alan Bovard (7th season)

1953 Midwestern college football independents records
	Conf.			Overall
Team	W	L	T	W		L		T
No. 2 Notre Dame		–		9	–	0	–	1
Cincinnati		–		9	–	1	–	0
Carthage		–		8	–	1	–	0
Youngstown		–		7	–	1	–	0
John Carroll		–		7	–	2	–	0
Washington University		–		7	–	2	–	0
Rose Poly		–		6	–	2	–	0
Wabash		–		6	–	2	–	1
Marquette		–		6	–	3	–	1
Baldwin–Wallace		–		4	–	4	–	0
Drake		–		4	–	4	–	0
Wayne		–		3	–	4	–	1
Dayton		–		3	–	5	–	1
Michigan Tech		–		2	–	5	–	0
Xavier		–		2	–	7	–	1
Rankings from AP Poll

The 1953 Michigan Tech Huskies football team, sometimes referred to as the Michigan Tech Engineers, represented the Michigan College of Mines and Technology (now known as Michigan Technological University) as an independent during the 1953 college football season. In their seventh year under head coach Alan Bovard, the team compiled a 2–5 record.

=== Schedule ===
Date	Opponent	Site	Result	Attendance	Source
September 19	Stevens Point State		L 7–24		
September 26	Northland (WI)		W 18–0		
October 3	Wheaton (IL)		L 0–29		
October 10	Ferris Institute		W 12–0		
October 17	Northern Michigan		L 18–19		
October 31	Superior State		L 16–34		
November 7	Quincy		L 6–42		

== 1954 ==
1954 Michigan Tech Huskies football
- Conference: Independent
- Record: 3–4
- Head coach: Alan Bovard (8th season)

1954 Midwestern college football independents records
	Conf.			Overall
Team	W	L	T	W		L		T
Omaha		–		10	–	0	–	0
No. 4 Notre Dame		–		9	–	1	–	0
Wabash		–		7	–	1	–	1
Cincinnati		–		8	–	2	–	0
Youngstown		–		7	–	2	–	0
Washington University		–		6	–	3	–	0
Carthage		–		5	–	3	–	0
Dayton		–		5	–	5	–	0
Michigan Tech		–		3	–	4	–	0
Marquette		–		3	–	5	–	1
Wayne		–		3	–	5	–	1
John Carroll		–		3	–	5	–	0
Rose Poly		–		2	–	5	–	0
Drake		–		2	–	7	–	0
Xavier		–		2	–	8	–	0
Baldwin–Wallace		–		1	–	8	–	0
Rankings from AP Poll

The 1954 Michigan Tech Huskies football team, sometimes referred to as the Michigan Tech Engineers, represented the Michigan College of Mines and Technology (now known as Michigan Technological University) as an independent during the 1954 college football season. In their eighth year under head coach Alan Bovard, the team compiled a 3–4 record.

=== Schedule ===
Date	Opponent	Site	Result	Attendance	Source
September 18	Stevens Point State		L 6–13		
October 2	St. Norbert		L 14–20		
October 9	Ferris Institute		L 0–25		
October 16	Northern Michigan		L 6–13		
October 23	Northland (WI)		W 20–13		
October 30	Moorhead State		W 13–0		
November 6	St. Cloud State		W 18–15		

== 1955 ==
1955 Michigan Tech Huskies football
- Conference: Independent
- Record: 4–3
- Head coach: Alan Bovard (9th season)

1955 Midwestern college football independents records
	Conf.			Overall
Team	W	L	T	W		L		T
Ferris Institute		–		6	–	1	–	0
No. 9 Notre Dame		–		8	–	2	–	0
Xavier		–		7	–	2	–	0
Carthage		–		6	–	2	–	0
Wabash		–		5	–	3	–	1
Michigan Tech		–		4	–	3	–	0
Washington University		–		5	–	4	–	0
Drake		–		4	–	4	–	0
Youngstown		–		4	–	5	–	0
Dayton		–		3	–	6	–	0
Marquette		–		2	–	6	–	1
Baldwin–Wallace		–		2	–	6	–	0
Cincinnati		–		1	–	6	–	2
Rose Poly		–		1	–	6	–	1
Northern Michigan		–		0	–	7	–	0
Rankings from AP Poll

The 1955 Michigan Tech Huskies football team, sometimes referred to as the Michigan Tech Engineers, represented the Michigan College of Mines and Technology (now known as Michigan Technological University) as an independent during the 1955 college football season. In their third year under head coach Omer LaJeunesse, the team compiled a 6–2 record.

=== Schedule ===
Date	Opponent	Site	Result	Attendance	Source
September 17	Stevens Point	Houghton, MI	L 6–18		
October 1	St. Norbert		W 19–13		
October 8	Ferris Institute		W 26–13		
October 15	Northern Michigan		W 46–12		
October 22	Northland (WI)		W 60–7		
October 29	Moorhead State		L 0–13		
November 4	Bemidji State		L 0–13		

== 1956 ==
1956 Michigan Tech Huskies football
- Conference: Independent
- Record: 2–5
- Head coach: Alan Bovard (10th season)

The 1956 Michigan Tech Huskies football team, sometimes referred to as the Michigan Tech Engineers, represented the Michigan College of Mines and Technology (now known as Michigan Technological University) as an independent during the 1956 college football season. In their tenth and final year under head coach Alan Bovard, the team compiled a 2–5 record.

=== Schedule ===
Date	Opponent	Site	Result	Attendance	Source
September 22	St. Cloud State		L 12–16		
September 29	St. Norbert		L 13–39		
October 6	Ferris Institute		W 20–0		
October 13	Northern Michigan	Houghton, MI	L 13–20		
October 20	Moorhead State		L 6–13		
November 3	Bemidji State		W 31–14		
November 10	Mankato State		L 6–40		

== 1957 ==
1957 Michigan Tech Huskies football
- Conference: Independent
- Record: 2–4
- Head coach: Omer LaJeunesse (1st season)

The 1957 Michigan Tech Huskies football team, sometimes referred to as the Michigan Tech Engineers, represented the Michigan College of Mines and Technology (now known as Michigan Technological University) as an independent during the 1957 college football season. In their first year under head coach Omer LaJeunesse, the team compiled a 2–4 record.

Michigan Tech tallied 1,016 rushing yards (169.3 yars per game) and 397 passing yards (66.2 yards per game). On defense, they gave up 1,337 rushing yards (222.8 yards per game) and 412 passing yards (68.7 yards per game). Halfback Jim Peter led the team in rushing (322 yards), total offense (337 yards), and receiving (196 yards). Quarterback Clay Willman led the team with 255 passing yards.

=== Schedule ===
Date	Opponent	Site	Result	Attendance	Source
September 21	Mankato State		L 0–28		
October 5	Ferris Institute		W 31–13		
October 12	at Northern Michigan	Marquette, MI	L 6–20		
October 19	Moorhead State		W 21–6		
October 26	Albion		L 0–20		
November 2	at St. Norbert	Minahan Stadium; De Pere, WI	L 19–43		

== 1958 ==
1958 Michigan Tech Huskies football
- Conference: Northern State College Conference
- Record: 4–4 (2–2 NSCC)
- Head coach: Omer LaJeunesse (2nd season)

1958 Northern State College Conference football standings
	Conf.					Overall
Team	W		L		T	W		L		T
Mankato State $	5	–	0	–	0	7	–	2	–	0
Bemidji State	4	–	1	–	0	7	–	1	–	0
Michigan Tech	2	–	2	–	0	4	–	4	–	0
Winona State	1	–	3	–	1	3	–	4	–	1
Moorhead State	1	–	4	–	0	1	–	7	–	0
St. Cloud State	0	–	3	–	1	1	–	6	–	1
$ – Conference champion

The 1958 Michigan Tech Huskies football team, sometimes referred to as the Michigan Tech Engineers, represented the Michigan College of Mines and Technology (now known as Michigan Technological University) as a member of the Northern State College Conference (NSCC) during the 1958 college football season. In their second year under head coach Omer LaJeunesse, the team compiled a 4–4 record (2–2 in conference games) and finished in third place in the NSCC.

Michigan Tech gained 1,404 rushing yards and 508 passing yards. On defense, they gave up they gave up 1,468 rushing yards and 494 passing yards. The team's individual statistical leaders included:

- Quarterback Clay Willman led the team in passing (397 yards) and total offense (436 yards).
- Fullback Ed Vernes led the team in both rushing (259 yards) and punting (22 punts, 34.0 yard average).
- End Gerald Carpenter was the leading receiver with eight catches for 210 yards and three touchdowns.

=== Schedule ===
Date	Opponent	Site	Result	Attendance	Source
September 13	Mankato State	Houghton, MI	L 16–26	2,000	
September 20	Bemidji State	Houghton, MI	L 21–36	1,850	
September 27	St. Norbert*	Houghton, MI	W 20–18	3,000	
October 4	at Ferris Institute*	Big Rapids, MI	W 35–7		
October 11	at Moorhead State	Moorhead, MM	W 28–0		
October 18	Northern Michigan*	Houghton, MI	L 0–34	5,000	
October 25	at Northern State*	Aberdeen, SD	L 6–28		
November 1	at Winona State	Winona, MN	W 26–6		
*Non-conference game

== 1959 ==
1959 Michigan Tech Huskies football

NSCC co-champion
- Conference: Northern State College Conference
- Record: 6–2 (4–1 NSCC)
- Head coach: Omer LaJeunesse (3rd season)

1959 Northern State College Conference football standings
	Conf.					Overall
Team	W		L		T	W		L		T
Bemidji State +	4	–	1	–	0	6	–	1	–	1
Michigan Tech +	4	–	1	–	0	6	–	2	–	0
Mankato State +	4	–	1	–	0	6	–	3	–	0
Winona State	2	–	3	–	0	2	–	5	–	0
St. Cloud State	1	–	4	–	0	2	–	6	–	0
Moorhead State	0	–	5	–	0	0	–	9	–	0
+ – Conference co-champions

The 1959 Michigan Tech Huskies football team, sometimes referred to as the Michigan Tech Engineers, represented the Michigan College of Mines and Technology (now known as Michigan Technological University) as a member of the Northern State College Conference (NSCC) during the 1959 college football season. In their third year under head coach Omer LaJeunesse, the team compiled a 6–2 record (4–1 in conference games) and finished in a three-way tie with Bemidji State and Mankato State for the NSCC championship.

The team gained 1,341 rushing yards and 957 passing yars. On defense, they gave up 1,285 rushing yards and 410 passing yards. Quarterback Clay Willman led the team in both passing (944 yards), rushing (389 yards), and total offense (1,333 yards). Willman had a high of 355 yards of ttal offense against Bemidji. Halfback Jack Boldt was the leading scorer with 66 points on 11 touchdowns. End Bill Wiljanen was the leading receiver with 28 catches for 454 yards.

Three Michigan Tech players were selected as first-team players on the 1959 All-NSCC football team: Willman at quarterback; Wiljanen as a utility lineman; and John Kwiatkowski at guard. Boldt was named a utility back on the second team, and Orvis Watia was selected as a guard on the second team.

=== Schedule ===
Date	Opponent	Site	Result	Attendance	Source
September 12	at Mankato State	Mankato, MN	L 0–14	3,000	
September 19	at Winona State	Maxwell Field; Winona, MN	W 12–0	2,850	
September 26	at Northern Michigan*	Marquette, MI	L 12–49	3,500	
October 3	Ferris Institute*	Houghton, MI	W 26–7	2,300	
October 10	Moorhead State	Houghton, MI	W 21–6	1,256	
October 17	at St. Cloud State	St. Cloud, MN	W 25–8	2,976	
October 25	Northern State*	Houghton, MI	W 35–13	1,128	
October 31	at Bemidji State	Bemidji, MN	W 22–0	2,780	
*Non-conference game
