= 1950 Dayton Flyers football team =

American college football season

1950 Dayton Flyers football
- Conference: Independent
- Record: 4–6
- Head coach: Joe Gavin (4th season)
- Home stadium: University of Dayton Stadium

1950 Midwestern college football independents records
	Conf.			Overall
Team	W	L	T	W		L		T
Valparaiso		–		9	–	1	–	0
No. 8 Michigan State		–		8	–	1	–	0
Xavier		–		8	–	1	–	0
John Carroll		–		8	–	2	–	0
Baldwin–Wallace		–		5	–	2	–	1
Michigan Tech		–		4	–	2	–	1
Marquette		–		5	–	3	–	1
Wabash		–		4	–	2	–	3
Butler		–		4	–	4	–	1
Notre Dame		–		4	–	4	–	1
Toledo		–		4	–	5	–	0
Bowling Green		–		3	–	4	–	2
Dayton		–		4	–	6	–	0
Youngstown		–		3	–	5	–	0
Ball State		–		2	–	4	–	1
Washington University		–		2	–	7	–	0
Wayne		–		2	–	7	–	0
Indiana State		–		1	–	7	–	1
Rose Poly		–		0	–	8	–	0
Rankings from AP Poll

The 1950 Dayton Flyers football team was an American football team that represented the University of Dayton as an independent during the 1950 college football season. In their fourth season under head coach Joe Gavin, the Flyers compiled a 4–6 record.

== Schedule ==
Date	Opponent	Site	Result	Attendance	Source
September 23	Youngstown	University of Dayton Stadium; Dayton, OH	W 7–0	7,500	
September 30	at St. Bonaventure	Forness Stadium; Olean, NY	L 14–40	11,500	
October 7	at No. 6 Kentucky	McLean Stadium; Lexington, KY	L 0–40	20,000	
October 14	at Toledo	Glass Bowl; Toledo, OH	W 14–13		
October 21	Quantico Marines	University of Dayton Stadium; Dayton, OH	L 0–7	8,000	
October 29	Xavier	University of Dayton Stadium; Dayton, OH	L 21–28	12,000	
November 4	John Carroll	University of Dayton Stadium; Dayton, OH	L 12–24	5,500	
November 11	at Miami (OH)	Miami Field; Oxford, OH	L 12–27	9,500	
November 18	Marshall	University of Dayton Stadium; Dayton, OH	W 35–6		
November 23	at Chattanooga	Chamberlain Field; Chattanooga, TN	W 7–4	8,500	
Rankings from AP Poll released prior to the game
