= 1950 Cincinnati Bearcats football team =

American college football season

1950 Cincinnati Bearcats football

Sun Bowl, L 13–14 vs. West Texas State
- Conference: Mid-American Conference
- Record: 8–4 (3–1 MAC)
- Head coach: Sid Gillman (2nd season)
- Captain: Pete St. Clair
- Home stadium: Nippert Stadium

1950 Mid-American Conference football standings
	Conf.					Overall
Team	W		L		T	W		L		T
Miami (OH) $	4	–	0	–	0	9	–	1	–	0
Cincinnati	3	–	1	–	0	8	–	4	–	0
Ohio	2	–	2	–	0	6	–	4	–	0
Western Reserve	1	–	3	–	0	2	–	8	–	0
Western Michigan	1	–	3	–	0	5	–	4	–	0
$ – Conference champion

The 1950 Cincinnati Bearcats football team was an American football team that represented the University of Cincinnati as a member of the Mid-American Conference (MAC) during the 1950 college football season. Led by second-year head coach Sid Gillman, the Bearcats compiled an overall record of 8–4 with a mark of 3–1 in conference play, placing second in the MAC. Cincinnati was invited to the Sun Bowl, where they lost to West Texas State.

== Schedule ==
Date	Opponent	Site	Result	Attendance	Source
September 16	Texas Western*	Nippert Stadium; Cincinnati, OH	W 32–0		
September 23	Hardin–Simmons*	Nippert Stadium; Cincinnati, OH	W 9–7	23,000	
September 30	at William & Mary*	Cary Field; Williamsburg, VA	L 14–20	7,500	
October 7	Louisville*	Nippert Stadium; Cincinnati, OH	W 28–20		
October 14	at No. 5 Kentucky*	McLean Stadium; Lexington, KY	L 7–41	35,000	
October 21	Western Reserve	Nippert Stadium; Cincinnati, OH	W 48–6		
October 28	at Western Michigan	Waldo Stadium; Kalamazoo, MI	W 27–6		
November 4	Ohio	Nippert Stadium; Cincinnati, OH	W 23–0		
November 11	Pacific (CA)*	Nippert Stadium; Cincinnati, OH	W 14–7	16,000	
November 18	Xavier*	Nippert Stadium; Cincinnati, OH (rivalry)	W 33–20	29,000	
November 25	Miami (OH)	Nippert Stadium; Cincinnati, OH (Victory Bell)	L 0–28	< 10,000	
January 1, 1951	vs. West Texas State*	Kidd Field; El Paso, TX (Sun Bowl)	L 13–14	15,000	
*Non-conference game; Rankings from AP Poll released prior to the game
