= 1950 Notre Dame Fighting Irish football team =

American college football season

1950 Notre Dame Fighting Irish football
- Conference: Independent
- Record: 4–4–1
- Head coach: Frank Leahy (8th season)
- Captain: Jerry Groom
- Home stadium: Notre Dame Stadium

1950 Midwestern college football independents records
	Conf.			Overall
Team	W	L	T	W		L		T
Valparaiso		–		9	–	1	–	0
No. 8 Michigan State		–		8	–	1	–	0
Xavier		–		8	–	1	–	0
John Carroll		–		8	–	2	–	0
Baldwin–Wallace		–		5	–	2	–	1
Michigan Tech		–		4	–	2	–	1
Marquette		–		5	–	3	–	1
Wabash		–		4	–	2	–	3
Butler		–		4	–	4	–	1
Notre Dame		–		4	–	4	–	1
Toledo		–		4	–	5	–	0
Bowling Green		–		3	–	4	–	2
Dayton		–		4	–	6	–	0
Youngstown		–		3	–	5	–	0
Ball State		–		2	–	4	–	1
Washington University		–		2	–	7	–	0
Wayne		–		2	–	7	–	0
Indiana State		–		1	–	7	–	1
Rose Poly		–		0	–	8	–	0
Rankings from AP Poll

The 1950 Notre Dame Fighting Irish football team was an American football team that represented the University of Notre Dame as an independent during the 1950 college football season. In their eighth year under head coach Frank Leahy, the Irish compiled a 4–4–1 record and were outscored by a total of 140 to 139. Though the 1949 team won the national championship, and the 1950 team was ranked No. 1 in the preseason AP poll the Irish dropped from the poll after losing three of their first five games.

Center and team captain Jerry Groom was a consensus first-team pick on the 1950 All-America college football team. In addition, quarterback Bob Williams received first-team All-America honors from the Associated Press, United Press, and Football Writers Association of America. Williams was also the second overall pick in the 1951 NFL draft with Groom following as the sixth overall pick.

The team played its home games at Notre Dame Stadium in Notre Dame, Indiana.

== Schedule ==
Date	Opponent	Rank	Site	Result	Attendance	Source
September 30	No. 20 North Carolina	No. 1	Notre Dame Stadium; Notre Dame, IN (rivalry)	W 14–7	56,430	
October 7	Purdue	No. 1	Notre Dame Stadium; Notre Dame, IN (rivalry)	L 14–28	56,746	
October 14	at Tulane	No. 10	Tulane Stadium; New Orleans, LA	W 13–9	73,159	
October 21	at Indiana	No. 11	Memorial Stadium; Bloomington, IN	L 7–20	34,100	
October 28	No. 15 Michigan State		Notre Dame Stadium; Notre Dame, IN (rivalry)	L 33–36	57,866	
November 4	vs. Navy		Municipal Stadium; Cleveland, OH (rivalry)	W 19–10	71,074	
November 11	Pittsburgh		Notre Dame Stadium; Notre Dame, IN (rivalry)	W 18–7	56,966	
November 18	at Iowa		Iowa Stadium; Iowa City, IA	T 14–14	52,863	
December 2	at USC		Los Angeles Memorial Coliseum; Los Angeles, CA (rivalry)	L 7–9	70,177	
Rankings from AP Poll released prior to the game
