= 1950 Miami Redskins football team =

American college football season

1950 Miami Redskins football

MAC champion Salad Bowl champion

Salad Bowl, W 34–21 vs. Arizona State
- Conference: Mid-American Conference
- Record: 9–1 (4–0 MAC)
- Head coach: Woody Hayes (2nd season)
- Captain: Doc Urich
- Home stadium: Miami Field

1950 Mid-American Conference football standings
| | Conf. | | | | | Overall |
| Team | W | | L | | T | W | | L | | T |
|---|---|---|---|---|---|---|---|---|---|---|
| Miami (OH) $ | 4 | – | 0 | – | 0 | 9 | – | 1 | – | 0 |
| Cincinnati | 3 | – | 1 | – | 0 | 8 | – | 4 | – | 0 |
| Ohio | 2 | – | 2 | – | 0 | 6 | – | 4 | – | 0 |
| Western Reserve | 1 | – | 3 | – | 0 | 2 | – | 8 | – | 0 |
| Western Michigan | 1 | – | 3 | – | 0 | 5 | – | 4 | – | 0 |
$ – Conference champion

The 1950 Miami Redskins football team was an American football team that represented Miami University during the 1950 college football season. In their second and final season under head coach Woody Hayes, the Redskins compiled a 9–1 record, outscored opponents by a combined total of 251 to 163, and defeated Arizona State, 34–21, in the 1951 Salad Bowl. Ara Parseghian was an assistant coach, and Bo Schembechler played at the tackle position on the team.

The Redskins ranked second among small college teams in total offense (416.3 yards per game) and third in passing offense (175.7 yards per game).

== Schedule ==
| Date | Time | Opponent | Site | Result | Attendance | Source |
|---|---|---|---|---|---|---|
| September 30 | | at Bowling Green* | University Field; Bowling Green, OH | W 54–6 | 4,330 | |
| October 7 | | Xavier* | Miami Field; Oxford, OH | L 0–7 | 11,724 | |
| October 14 | | Western Michigan | Miami Field; Oxford, OH | W 35–0 | 8,145 | |
| October 21 | 3:00 p.m. | Butler* | Butler Bowl; Indianapolis, IN | W 42–7 | 2,503 | |
| October 28 | | at Ohio | Peden Stadium; Athens, OH (rivalry) | W 28–20 | 14,000 | |
| November 4 | | Wichita*^{†} | Miami Field; Oxford, OH | W 39–13 | 11,000 | |
| November 11 | | Dayton* | Miami Field; Oxford, OH | W 27–12 | 9,500 | |
| November 18 | | at Western Reserve | Shaw Stadium; East Cleveland, OH | W 69–14 | | |
| November 25 | | at Cincinnati | Nippert Stadium; Cincinnati, OH (rivalry) | W 28–0 | < 10,000 | |
| January 1, 1951 | | vs. Arizona State* | Montgomery Stadium; Phoenix, AZ (Salad Bowl) | W 34–21 | 24,000 | |
*Non-conference game; ^{†}Homecoming; All times are in Eastern time
