= 1950 Bowling Green Falcons football team =

American college football season

1950 Bowling Green Falcons football
- Conference: Independent
- Record: 3–4–2
- Head coach: Robert Whittaker (10th season)
- Captain: Doug Mooney
- Home stadium: University Stadium

1950 Midwestern college football independents records
	Conf.			Overall
Team	W	L	T	W		L		T
Valparaiso		–		9	–	1	–	0
No. 8 Michigan State		–		8	–	1	–	0
Xavier		–		8	–	1	–	0
John Carroll		–		8	–	2	–	0
Baldwin–Wallace		–		5	–	2	–	1
Michigan Tech		–		4	–	2	–	1
Marquette		–		5	–	3	–	1
Wabash		–		4	–	2	–	3
Butler		–		4	–	4	–	1
Notre Dame		–		4	–	4	–	1
Toledo		–		4	–	5	–	0
Bowling Green		–		3	–	4	–	2
Dayton		–		4	–	6	–	0
Youngstown		–		3	–	5	–	0
Ball State		–		2	–	4	–	1
Washington University		–		2	–	7	–	0
Wayne		–		2	–	7	–	0
Indiana State		–		1	–	7	–	1
Rose Poly		–		0	–	8	–	0
Rankings from AP Poll

The 1950 Bowling Green Falcons football team was an American football team that represented Bowling Green State University as an independent during the 1950 college football season. The team was led by tenth-year head coach Robert Whittaker. The Falcons compiled a 3–4–2 record and were outscored by a combined total of 188 to 134.

== Schedule ==
Date	Opponent	Site	Result	Attendance	Source
September 23	at Rider	Lawrenceville, NJ	T 0–0		
September 30	Miami (OH)	University Field; Bowling Green, OH	L 6–54	4,330	
October 7	Bradley	University Field; Bowling Green, OH	W 20–14		
October 14	at Central Michigan	Alumni Field; Mount Pleasant, MI	L 0–12	6,000	
October 21	Baldwin–Wallace	University Field; Bowling Green, OH	T 34–34		
October 28	at Toledo	Glass Bowl; Toledo, OH (rivalry)	W 39–14		
November 4	at Kent State	Memorial Stadium; Kent, OH (rivalry)	L 6–19		
November 11	Youngstown	University Field; Bowling Green, OH	W 22–7		
November 18	at Eastern Kentucky	Hanger Field; Richmond, KY	L 7–34		
