= 1950 Butler Bulldogs football team =

American college football season

1950 Butler Bulldogs football
- Conference: Independent
- Record: 4–4–1
- Head coach: Tony Hinkle (13th season)
- Home stadium: Butler Bowl

1950 Midwestern college football independents records
	Conf.			Overall
Team	W	L	T	W		L		T
Valparaiso		–		9	–	1	–	0
No. 8 Michigan State		–		8	–	1	–	0
Xavier		–		8	–	1	–	0
John Carroll		–		8	–	2	–	0
Baldwin–Wallace		–		5	–	2	–	1
Michigan Tech		–		4	–	2	–	1
Marquette		–		5	–	3	–	1
Wabash		–		4	–	2	–	3
Butler		–		4	–	4	–	1
Notre Dame		–		4	–	4	–	1
Toledo		–		4	–	5	–	0
Bowling Green		–		3	–	4	–	2
Dayton		–		4	–	6	–	0
Youngstown		–		3	–	5	–	0
Ball State		–		2	–	4	–	1
Washington University		–		2	–	7	–	0
Wayne		–		2	–	7	–	0
Indiana State		–		1	–	7	–	1
Rose Poly		–		0	–	8	–	0
Rankings from AP Poll

The 1950 Butler Bulldogs football team represented Butler University as an independent during the 1950 college football season. Led by 13th-year head coach Tony Hinkle, the Bulldogs compiled a record of 4–4–1. Butler played home games at the Butler Bowl in Indianapolis.

== Schedule ==
Date	Time	Opponent	Site	Result	Attendance	Source
September 23	8:00 p.m.	at Evansville	Reitz Bowl; Evansville, IN	L 12–14	7,000	
September 30	2:00 p.m.	Wabash	Butler Bowl; Indianapolis, IN	T 7–7	6,000	
October 7	2:00 p.m.	Ohio	Butler Bowl; Indianapolis, IN	L 14–21		
October 14	2:00 p.m.	at Ball State	Ball State Field; Muncie, IN	W 33–7	4,000	
October 21	2:00 p.m.	Miami (OH)	Butler Bowl; Indianapolis, IN	L 7–42	2,503	
October 28	1:00 p.m.	at Western Reserve	Shaw Stadium; East Cleveland, OH	W 25–14	6,000	
November 4	1:00 p.m.	at Western Michigan	Waldo Stadium; Kalamazoo, MI	L 13–34	5,000	
November 11	1:30 p.m.	Washington University^{†}	Butler Bowl; Indianapolis, IN	W 25–20	2,488	
November 18	1:30 p.m.	at Indiana State	Memorial Stadium; Terre Haute, IN	W 32–0	200	
^{†}Homecoming; All times are in Central time
