= 1950 Ohio Bobcats football team =

American college football season

1950 Ohio Bobcats football
- Conference: Mid-American Conference
- Record: 6–4 (2–2 MAC)
- Head coach: Carroll Widdoes (2nd season)
- Home stadium: Peden Stadium

1950 Mid-American Conference football standings
	Conf.					Overall
Team	W		L		T	W		L		T
Miami (OH) $	4	–	0	–	0	9	–	1	–	0
Cincinnati	3	–	1	–	0	8	–	4	–	0
Ohio	2	–	2	–	0	6	–	4	–	0
Western Reserve	1	–	3	–	0	2	–	8	–	0
Western Michigan	1	–	3	–	0	5	–	4	–	0
$ – Conference champion

The 1950 Ohio Bobcats football team was an American football team that represented Ohio University in the Mid-American Conference (MAC) during the 1950 college football season. In their second season under head coach Carroll Widdoes, the Bobcats compiled a 6–4 record (2–2 against MAC opponents), finished in third place in the MAC, and outscored all opponents by a combined total of 165 to 161. They played their home games in Peden Stadium in Athens, Ohio.

The team's statistical leaders included Quinn Stumpf with 609 rushing yards, Tom Anderson with 633 passing yards, and Nick Fogoros with 177 receiving yards.

== Schedule ==
Date	Time	Opponent	Site	Result	Attendance	Source
September 23		at Akron*	Rubber Bowl; Akron, OH	W 28–6		
September 30		at No. 8 Illinois*	Memorial Stadium; Champaign, IL	L 2–28		
October 7	3:00 p.m.	at Butler*	Butler Bowl; Indianapolis, IN	W 21–14		
October 14		Western Reserve	Peden Stadium; Athens, OH	W 35–0		
October 21		at Kent State*	Memorial Stadium; Kent, OH	L 13–35		
October 28		at Miami (OH)	Peden Stadium; Athens, OH (rivalry)	L 20–28	14,000	
November 4		at Cincinnati	Nippert Stadium; Cincinnati, OH	L 0–23		
November 11		at Buffalo*	Civic Stadium; Buffalo, NY	W 22–14	1,500	
November 18		Western Michigan	Peden Stadium; Athens, OH	W 10–7		
November 23		Marshall*	Peden Stadium; Athens, OH (rivalry)	W 14–6		
*Non-conference game; Rankings from AP Poll released prior to the game; All times are in Eastern time
