= 1950 Western Reserve Red Cats football team =

American college football season

1950 Western Reserve Red Cats football
- Conference: Mid-American Conference
- Record: 2–8 (1–3 MAC)
- Head coach: Richard W. Luther (2nd season)
- Home stadium: Shaw Stadium

1950 Mid-American Conference football standings
	Conf.					Overall
Team	W		L		T	W		L		T
Miami (OH) $	4	–	0	–	0	9	–	1	–	0
Cincinnati	3	–	1	–	0	8	–	4	–	0
Ohio	2	–	2	–	0	6	–	4	–	0
Western Reserve	1	–	3	–	0	2	–	8	–	0
Western Michigan	1	–	3	–	0	5	–	4	–	0
$ – Conference champion

The 1950 Western Reserve Red Cats football team represented the Western Reserve University—now known as Case Western Reserve University—as a member of the Mid-American Conference (MAC) during the 1950 college football season. Led by Richard W. Luther in his second and final season as head coach, the Red Cats compiled an overall record of 2–8 with a mark of 1–3 in conference play, tying for fourth place in the MAC. Lou Zontini served as an assistant coach for the team.

Quarterback Al Morhard led all college football with 26 interceptions thrown during the 1950 college football season. He completed 75 of 215 passes for a .349 completion percentage.

== Schedule ==
Date	Time	Opponent	Site	Result	Attendance	Source
September 23		at West Virginia*	Mountaineer Field; Morgantown, WV	L 13–38		
September 30	8:15 p.m.	Washington University*	Shaw Stadium; East Cleveland, OH	W 24–20	5,684	
October 7		at Colgate*	Colgate Athletic Field; Hamilton, NY	L 6–47	4,000	
October 14		at Ohio	Peden Stadium; Athens, OH	L 0–35		
October 21		at Cincinnati	Nippert Stadium; Cincinnati, OH	L 6–48		
October 28	2:00 p.m.	Butler*	Shaw Stadium; East Cleveland, OH	L 14–25	6,000	
November 4		at Toledo*	Glass Bowl; Toledo, OH	L 7–27		
November 11		at Western Michigan	Waldo Stadium; Kalamazoo, MI	W 26–0		
November 18		Miami (OH)	Shaw Stadium; East Cleveland, OH	L 14–69		
November 23		Case Tech*	Shaw Stadium; East Cleveland, OH	L 7–20		
*Non-conference game; All times are in Eastern time
