= 1950 Xavier Musketeers football team =

American college football season

1950 Xavier Musketeers football
- Conference: Independent
- Record: 8–1
- Head coach: Ed Kluska (4th season)
- Home stadium: Xavier Stadium

1950 Midwestern college football independents records
	Conf.			Overall
Team	W	L	T	W		L		T
Valparaiso		–		9	–	1	–	0
No. 8 Michigan State		–		8	–	1	–	0
Xavier		–		8	–	1	–	0
John Carroll		–		8	–	2	–	0
Baldwin–Wallace		–		5	–	2	–	1
Michigan Tech		–		4	–	2	–	1
Marquette		–		5	–	3	–	1
Wabash		–		4	–	2	–	3
Butler		–		4	–	4	–	1
Notre Dame		–		4	–	4	–	1
Toledo		–		4	–	5	–	0
Bowling Green		–		3	–	4	–	2
Dayton		–		4	–	6	–	0
Youngstown		–		3	–	5	–	0
Ball State		–		2	–	4	–	1
Washington University		–		2	–	7	–	0
Wayne		–		2	–	7	–	0
Indiana State		–		1	–	7	–	1
Rose Poly		–		0	–	8	–	0
Rankings from AP Poll

The 1950 Xavier Musketeers football team was an American football team that represented Xavier University as an independent during the 1950 college football season. In its fourth season under head coach Ed Kluska, the team compiled an 8–1 record and outscored opponents by a total of 247 to 141 The team played its home games at Xavier Stadium in Cincinnati.

Among other games, Xavier defeated the otherwise unbeaten 1950 Miami Redskins football team that was coached by Woody Hayes and Ara Parseghian and that featured John Pont at halfback and Bo Schembechler at tackle.

== Schedule ==
Date	Opponent	Site	Result	Attendance	Source
September 17	Quantico Marines	Xavier Stadium; Cincinnati, OH	W 34–13	14,638	
September 23	at John Carroll	Shaw Stadium; East Cleveland, OH	W 24–19	7,800	
September 30	Morehead State	Xavier Stadium; Cincinnati, OH	W 42–7	10,743	
October 7	at Miami (OH)	Miami Field; Oxford, OH	W 7–0	11,724	
October 14	Louisiana Tech	Xavier Stadium; Cincinnati, OH	W 35–21	9,500	
October 21	Louisville^{†}	Xavier Stadium; Cincinnati, OH	W 36–13	9,000	
October 29	at Dayton	UD Stadium; Dayton, OH	W 28–21	12,000	
November 18	at Cincinnati	Nippert Stadium; Cincinnati, OH	L 20–33	29,000	
November 23	St. Bonaventure	Xavier Stadium; Cincinnati, OH	W 21–14	10,000	
^{†}Homecoming
