= 1950 John Carroll Blue Streaks football team =

American college football season

1950 John Carroll Blue Streaks football
- Conference: Independent
- Record: 8–2
- Head coach: Herb Eisele (4th season)

1950 Midwestern college football independents records
	Conf.			Overall
Team	W	L	T	W		L		T
Valparaiso		–		9	–	1	–	0
No. 8 Michigan State		–		8	–	1	–	0
Xavier		–		8	–	1	–	0
John Carroll		–		8	–	2	–	0
Baldwin–Wallace		–		5	–	2	–	1
Michigan Tech		–		4	–	2	–	1
Marquette		–		5	–	3	–	1
Wabash		–		4	–	2	–	3
Butler		–		4	–	4	–	1
Notre Dame		–		4	–	4	–	1
Toledo		–		4	–	5	–	0
Bowling Green		–		3	–	4	–	2
Dayton		–		4	–	6	–	0
Youngstown		–		3	–	5	–	0
Ball State		–		2	–	4	–	1
Washington University		–		2	–	7	–	0
Wayne		–		2	–	7	–	0
Indiana State		–		1	–	7	–	1
Rose Poly		–		0	–	8	–	0
Rankings from AP Poll

The 1950 John Carroll Blue Streaks football team was an American football team that represented John Carroll University as an independent during the 1950 college football season. In their fourth year under head coach Herb "Skeeter" Eisele, The team compiled an 8–2 record and outscored opponents by a total of 322 to 127. The team ranked third among small college teams in total offense with 414.4 yards per game.

Senior Don Shula played at the halfback position. Shula later spent more than 40 years in the National Football League (NFL) as a player and coach and was inducted into the Pro Football Hall of Fame. John Carroll's football stadium is named Don Shula Stadium in his honor.

Fullback Carl Taseff tallied 1,164 rushing yards, led all small colleges with 138 points scored, won first-team honors on the 1950 Little All-America college football team, and was also selected by the AP as the captain of the All-Ohio football team. Taseff later played in the NFL and was an assistant coach under Shula with the Miami Dolphins.

== Schedule ==
Date	Opponent	Site	Result	Attendance	Source
September 23	Xavier	Cleveland, OH	L 19–24	7,800	
September 30	at Toledo	Glass Bowl; Toledo, OH	W 41–0		
October 7	Kent State	Shaw Stadium; Cleveland, OH	W 48–7	6,200	
October 14	Youngstown	Cleveland, OH	W 27–0		
October 21	Case Tech		W 51–14		
October 28	at Marshall	Fairfield Stadium; Huntington, WV	W 39–2	8,000	
November 4	Dayton	University of Dayton Stadium; Dayton, OH	W 24–12	5,500	
November 10	Syracuse	Cleveland, OH	W 21–16	16,724	
November 18	Baldwin–Wallace	Cleveland, OH	W 33–25		
