= Reuther's Treaty of Detroit =

1950 labor contract

Reuther's Treaty of Detroit was a five-year contract negotiated by trade union president Walter Reuther between the United Auto Workers (UAW) and General Motors in 1950. The UAW reached similar deals with the other members of the Big Three automakers, Ford Motor Company and Chrysler. The UAW agreed to a long-term contract, which protected automakers from annual strikes, and it gave up the right to bargain over some issues in exchange for extensive health, unemployment, and pension benefits; expanded vacation time; and cost-of-living adjustments to wages.

The contract shaped labor-management relations in the auto industry for decades, and it was used as a model for labor-corporation agreements in a variety of other industries.

== Prior negotiations ==
Upon the conclusion of World War II, both the automakers and autoworkers were free to address grievances that had accumulated during the war. The two sides would enter multiple contract negotiations in the decades following the end of the war. Reuther's Treaty of Detroit was a notable achievement for the UAW that followed three rounds of negotiations since 1945.

The first negotiation after the war began with a strike of 320,000 GM workers on November 21, 1945, with Reuther demanding a 30% wage increase and a pledge from GM not to raise car prices. The strike lasted 113 days and was ultimately undermined by settlements reached with Ford and Chrysler, who agreed to wage increases from 18 to 18.5 cents. The United Electrical Workers (UE), representing 30,000 GM employees, the United Steel Workers, and the rubber workers also settled for 18.5 cents, forcing the UAW to follow suit. Despite the failure of the strike, Reuther had been seen as an aggressive leader throughout and he capitalized on the image to attain the presidency of UAW.

The 1946 strike, which became known as the First Round, was followed by a Second Round of negotiations in 1947. The 1947 contract with General Motors included a major change, the cost-of-living allowance (COLA). The first scheme of its kind in a mass-production industry, COLA pegged a workers wage to the cost-of-living index of the Bureau of Labor Statistics.

The third round was negotiated by Emil Mazey, secretary-treasurer of the union and achieved a thirteen-cent-an-hour increase in wages from the Chrysler Corporation. Reuther began the Fourth Round in January 1949, which would result in his Treaty of Detroit.

== Goals ==
After World War II, health and welfare had become critical issues in labor contracts across industries, and Reuther chose pensions and company-funded medical care as the focus of his bargaining in 1949. Since inflation in the postwar economy had reduced the significance of the $32 a month benefit from Social Security, the issue of pensions had become more important than ever.

Historically, retirement security was an individual responsibility. In particular, since the recipient of a pension was, by definition, no longer an employee, companies had argued that a pension could not be their responsibility. Reuther believed that retirement did not end a worker's association with a union, and workers deserved a lifelong pension. Reuther was adamant that the pension plans be fully funded, actuarially sound (the amount set needed to be set to the life expectancies of the pensioners), and noncontributory, with the full cost borne by the company.

The automakers were principally concerned with negotiating a longer contract to protect the manufacturers from annual strikes, avoid the costs of undergoing negotiations each year, and give control over long-term scheduling of production, model changes, and tool and plant investment.

== Negotiations with Ford and Chrysler ==
Under Reuther, the UAW had adopted a strategy of collective bargaining in which the UAW negotiated with and threatened to strike only one of the Big Three automakers. Once concessions had been earned at one, in the next round of negotiations, the other two were likely to match terms of the first. Reuther called this strategy "getting a foot in the door."

In 1949, Reuther chose Ford as his first target. In 1947, Ford had offered its workers a choice between a contributory pension plan and wage increases. While the UAW took wage increases at the time, Reuther suspected that Ford might be most amenable to a pension plan. New management and an aging workforce at Ford also suggested that the UAW would have the best chances of success with Ford.

In September 1949, to avoid a strike, Ford agreed to pay $20 million a year to pay the entire cost of pensions. Workers with 30 years' service would receive $100 a month. Ford agreed that the pension plan would be both fully funded and actuarially sound.

After its success with Ford, the UAW moved on to Chrysler. While Chrysler was willing to match the $100-a-month pension plan, it refused to fund it fully. Not willing to yield on this point, Reuther initiated a strike that would last 104 days. It was during this strike that Reuther coined the phrase "too old to work and too young to die," referring to financially unsupported retirees. Chrysler gave in after nearly three months and $1 billion lost in sales.

== Agreement with GM ==
Seeking to avoid the cost Chrysler had paid, GM negotiated a contract with the UAW a few weeks after Chrysler in 1950. The contract included a fully funded, actuarially sound pension plan of $125 a month, including Social Security. The contract continued COLA and raised the annual improvement factor to 4 cents an hour.

Also, GM agreed to cover one half of the cost for workers and their families. The UAW, in return, agreed to a five-year term of the contract. Fortune named the contract the "Treaty of Detroit" and noted Reuther's impressive negotiating abilities. Ford and Chrysler soon negotiated contracts along the same lines as the Treaty.

== Impact ==
The Treaty affected the lives of many laborers and influenced labor contracts and law making in the following decades. The "Treaty" made pensions and healthcare a permanent part of labor contracts. In 1974, funding was made a requirement for all plans. The Treaty, along with other gains made by the union over the next decade moved autoworkers in America into the middle class, with wages since the war nearly doubling and home ownership becoming common among laborers.
