= 1950 Tennessee A&I Tigers football team =

American college football season

1950 Tennessee A&I Tigers football
- Conference: Midwest Athletic Association
- Record: 9–2 (2–1 MWAA)
- Head coach: Henry Kean (7th season)
- Home stadium: Sulphur Dell, A&I College Stadium

1950 Midwest Athletic Association football standings
	Conf.					Overall
Team	W		L		T	W		L		T
No. 12 Wilberforce State $	3	–	0	–	0	6	–	4	–	0
No. 4 Tennessee A&I	2	–	1	–	0	9	–	2	–	0
Kentucky State	1	–	2	–	0	4	–	5	–	1
Lincoln (MO)	0	–	3	–	0	1	–	7	–	0
$ – Conference champion; Rankings from the Pittsburgh Courier

The 1950 Tennessee A&I Tigers football team represented Tennessee Agricultural & Industrial State College as a member of the Midwest Athletic Association (MWAA) during the 1950 college football season. In their seventh season under head coach Henry Kean, the Tigers compiled an overall record of 9–2 with a mark of 2–1 in conference play, placing second in the MWAA. The Dickinson System rated Tennessee A&I as the No. 4 black college football team for 1950 with a score of 25.56, behind only Florida A&M (28.76), Southern (28.50), and Maryland State (28.00). The team played its home games in Nashville, Tennessee.

== Schedule ==
Date	Time	Opponent	Site	Result	Attendance	Source
September 22	8:00 p.m.	vs. Lincoln (MO)	Melrose Stadium; Memphis, TN (Bluff City Classic)	W 20–0	10,000	
September 30		Langston*	Nashville, TN	L 6–13		
October 7		at Allen*	Columbia, SC	W 26–6		
October 13		West Virginia State*	Sulphur Dell; Nashville, TN	W 13–2	4,500	
October 20	8:30 p.m.	vs. Wilberforce State	Comiskey Park; Chicago, IL	L 0–6	8,892	
October 27	8:00 p.m.	North Carolina College*	Sulphur Dell; Nashville, TN	W 27–20		
November 3		vs. North Carolina A&T*	Griffith Stadium; Washington, DC (Capital Classic)	W 28–13	20,000	
November 11	1:30 p.m.	at Morris Brown*	Herndon Stadium; Atlanta, GA	W 14–0		
November 18		at Kentucky State	Frankfort, KY	W 45–13		
November 23	1:30 p.m.	Grambling*^{†}	A&I College Stadium; Nashville, TN	W 55–7	5,000	
December 1	7:15 p.m.	at Jackson*	Alumni Field; Jackson, MS (Mid South Classic)	W 33–0	3,500	
*Non-conference game; ^{†}Homecoming; All times are in Central time
