= Jimmy Cole (American football) =

American football player and official (died 2022)

- Cole in 1953
- Born: 1931 or 1932
- Died: November 17, 2022 (aged 90)
- Education: University of Memphis
- Occupations: Football player and official
- Years active: 1950–1954 (player); 1955–1976 (official)
- Awards: Memphis State Tigers All-Time Team (1958); University of Memphis "M" Club Hall of Fame (1977); Tennessee Sports Hall of Fame (2002)

James Cole (1931 or 1932 – November 17, 2022) was an American football player and official. He played college football as a running back, defensive back, punter, and kick returner at Memphis State College (now known as the University of Memphis) for four seasons and later served as an official in the Southeastern Conference (SEC) and the National Football League (NFL).

== Early life and education ==
A native of Memphis, Tennessee, Cole attended Messick High School and was a multi-sport star. He earned a total of 14 varsity letters while playing football, baseball, track and basketball. He was an All-Memphis selection in all but track. Although originally slated to attend the University of Mississippi (Ole Miss), Cole was ruled ineligible to play in the Southeastern Conference (SEC) after the school offered him "excessive offers of financial aid."

After being ruled ineligible to play in the SEC, Cole decided to sign with Memphis State College (now known as the University of Memphis). He saw immediate playing time in football as a true freshman in 1950 and helped the team compile a 9–2 record, playing running back, defensive back, punter and kick returner. In their 1951 game against the Mississippi State Maroons, Cole played a major role, scoring a 65-yard interception return touchdown and what should have been the game-winning reception to win 27–21. However, the referees made a mistake, ruling that Cole had been out of bounds, and Mississippi State eventually won; a photo published the next day in The Commercial Appeal showed he was clearly in bounds on the catch.

At the end of the 1951 season, Cole received an honorable mention on the 1951 Little All-America college football team. He missed the 1952 season due to a leg injury, and while injured, Memphis State won only two games while losing seven. Cole attempted to return to the team in 1953, saying that "if [his legs] stood up under the strain, all right. If they didn't he'd have to call it quits." He made the team and became one of their top players, being one of their "big threats." His best career game came against Mississippi Southern on October 31 that season, when he played a key role in helping Memphis State pull off the 27–13 upset. In each of three successive plays in the match, Cole blocked a field goal to keep the score a 13–13 tie, returned a kickoff 77-yards for a touchdown, and kicked the extra point to put the team up 20–13. He was carried off the field by his teammates after the game ended. Following the 1953 season, where he helped Memphis State compile a 6–4 record, Cole received honorable mention on the 1953 Little All-America college football team. He played one more season at Memphis State in 1954, and helped them go 3–4–3, being named their "best tackler" at the end of the year.

== Later life and death ==
After graduating from Memphis State in 1955, Cole began an officiating career, starting at the school's prep games. By 1958, he had become a back judge in the Southeastern Conference, where he served through 1970 and officiated several bowl games, including two Sugar Bowls, one Cotton Bowl, two Orange Bowls, two Liberty Bowls, and two Gator Bowls. Widely regarded as one of their "elite" officials, Cole was brought into the National Football League (NFL) as a field judge in 1970. He was 37 at the time, being younger than most other officials hired by the NFL. He worked with the NFL through 1976, and served in two Pro Bowls, two conference championships, and numerous playoff games.

Cole also worked at Coca-Cola, for the city of Memphis as Solid Waste Director, and on the city's Planning Commission in the 1970s. After leaving Memphis in 1982, he remained in the solid waste industry, later working for Browning-Ferris Industries (BFI) and Waste Management until retiring in 2008.

Cole was inducted into the University of Memphis "M" Club Hall of Fame in 1977, the American Football Foundation Hall of Fame as both an official and a player, and the Tennessee Sports Hall of Fame in 2002. Additionally, he was named to the Memphis State Tigers All-Time Football Team in 1958.

Cole died on November 17, 2022, at age 90.
