= Bob Heimerdinger =

American football fullback

Profile
- Position: Quarterback

Personal information
- Listed weight: 190 lb (86 kg)

Career information
- College: Northern Illinois (1949–1951)

Bob Heimerdinger is an American former football quarterback. He played for the Northern Illinois Huskies football team from 1949 to 1951.

As a junior, he led all small college players during the 1950 college football season with 1,782 yards in nine games. He completed 102 of 210 passes for 1,597 yards an 13 touchdowns.

As a senior, Heimerdinger led all small college players in total offense for the second consecutive year, tallying 1,775 yards. He was the first player in small college history to repeat as national total offense leader. His 1,710 passing yards also ranked first among small college players. He also led the 1951 Northern Illinois State Huskies football team to a perfect 9–0 record and was selected as the team's most valuable player. He was also picked as a second-team back on the 1951 Little All-America college football team. His jersey number (12) was retired by Northern Illinois in February 1952.

In March 1952, Heimerdinger was hired as a math teacher and coach at Paw Paw High School in Paw Paw, Illinois. He next coached at Leyden Township High School and DeKalb High School. was named head football coach at DeKalb in April 1956.

Heimerdinger's son Mike Heimerdinger was a coach in the National Football League.
