= James A. Stevens =

American sports coach, athletics administrator (c. 1907 – 1983)

- Stevens pictured in The Eagle 1966, NCC yearbook

Biographical details
- Born: c. 1907
- Died: August 5, 1983; Durham, North Carolina, U.S.

Coaching career (HC unless noted)

Football
- 1937–1941: Bishop
- 1947–1948: Prairie View A&M (assistant)
- 1949–1951: Prairie View A&M
- 1952–1953: North Carolina A&T (assistant)
- 1954–1964: North Carolina College (assistant)
- 1965–1967: North Carolina College

Basketball
- c. 1949–1952: Prairie View A&M

Track and field
- c. 1949–1952: Prairie View A&M

Administrative career (AD unless noted)
- 1937–1942: Bishop
- 1949–1952: Prairie View A&M

Head coaching record
- Overall: 48–44–7 (college football)
- Bowls: 2–0–1

Accomplishments and honors

Championships
- Football; 1 SWAC (1951)

James Alexander Stevens (c. 1907 – August 5, 1983) was an American football, basketball, and track and field coach, athletics administrator, and educator. He coached at Prairie View A&M University, where he was credited for building the program's "dynasty" in its "glory years." He later went on to coach at North Carolina College at Durham—now known as North Carolina Central University.

== Early life and education ==
A native of St. Louis, Stevens earned a Bachelor of Science degree at Kansas State Teachers College of Pittsburg—now known as Pittsburg State University—and a Master of Science at the University of Southern California (USC).

== Coaching career ==
=== Prairie View A&M ===
Stevens was the seventh head football coach at Prairie View A&M University in Prairie View, Texas, holding that position for three seasons, from 1949 until 1951. His record at Prairie View was 24–7.

=== North Carolina College ===
In 1965, Stevens was named the tenth head football coach at North Carolina College at Durham—now known as North Carolina Central University. He held that position for three seasons, from 1965 to 1967, compiling a record of 10–15–2.

== Later life, family, and death ==
After retiring from coaching, Steven's remained a member of the faculty at North Carolina College until 1981. He died at the age of 76, on August 5, 1983, at Durham County General Hospital.

Stevens was married to Jocelyn Cain, who died in 1980, and had two sons.

== Head coaching record ==
=== College football ===
Year	Team	Overall	Conference	Standing	Bowl/playoffs
Bishop Tigers (Southwestern Athletic Conference) (1937–1941)
1937	Bishop	1–6–1	0–6	7th	
1938	Bishop	4–5–1	1–4–1	7th	
1939	Bishop	3–2–2	2–2–2	T–4th	
1940	Bishop	4–4	2–4	5th	
1941	Bishop	3–4	3–3	5th	
Bishop:		15–21–4	8–19–3		
Prairie View A&M Panthers (Southwestern Athletic Conference) (1949–1951)
1949	Prairie View A&M	8–3	5–2	3rd	W Prairie View
1950	Prairie View A&M	6–4–1	4–3	4th	T Prairie View
1951	Prairie View A&M	9–1	6–1	1st	W Prairie View
Prairie View A&M:		23–8–1	15–6		
North Carolina College Eagles (Central Intercollegiate Athletic Association) (1965–1967)
1965	North Carolina College	3–5–1	3–4–1	9th	
1966	North Carolina College	6–3	6–1	2nd	
1967	North Carolina College	1–7–1	1–5–1	14th	
North Carolina College:		10–15–2	10–10–2		
Total:		48–44–7			
National championship Conference title Conference division title or championship game berth
