= Tom Kingston =

Tom Kingston or Thomas Kingston may refer to:

- Tom Kingston (rugby union) (born 1991), Australian rugby player
- Tom Kingston (hurler) (born 1967), Irish hurler
- Tom Kingston (rugby league) (born 1988), Australian rugby league player
- Thomas Kingston (financier) (1978–2024), British diplomat, financier and royal; husband of Lady Gabriella Kingston (née Windsor)

== See also ==
- Tom Hingston (born 1973), British graphic designer and creative director
- Tom Kingsford (1928–2005), American football player and coach
