= 1951 Orange Bowl =

American college football game

- 17th Orange Bowl
- Burdine Stadium in Miami, Florida, hosted the Orange Bowl.
Clemson Tigers	Miami Hurricanes
(8–0–1)	(9–0–1)
SoCon	Independent
15	14
Head coach: Frank Howard	Head coach: Andy Gustafson
AP / Coaches; 10 / 10	AP / Coaches; 15 / 16
	1	2	3	4	Total
Clemson	0	7	6	2	15
Miami	0	0	14	0	14
- Date: January 1, 1951
- Season: 1950
- Stadium: Burdine Stadium
- Location: Miami, Florida
- Favorite: Miami by 1
- Referee: John J. Lynch (SEC; split crew: SEC, Southern)
- Attendance: 65,181

The 1951 Orange Bowl was a college football postseason bowl game between the Miami Hurricanes and the Clemson Tigers played on January 1, 1951. Played in Miami at Burdine Stadium, it was the 17th edition of the annual Orange Bowl.

== Background ==
Although they finished second in the Southern Conference, the Clemson Tigers were undefeated—they had won eight games, and tied South Carolina—en route to their first Orange Bowl appearance. Similarly, the Miami Hurricanes were undefeated, with nine wins and a tie (against Louisville), and were playing in their third Orange Bowl, having lost the 1935 edition and having won the 1946 edition. The teams had only met once before, in a 7–6 win by Miami in 1945.

== Game summary ==
Fred Cone gave Clemson a 7–0 lead on his one-yard touchdown run that culminated a 76-yard drive, which proved to be the halftime lead as the Hurricanes mustered just one first down in the first half. Six plays after Clemson received the opening kickoff in the second half, Glenn Smith caught a pass from Billy Hair for a touchdown. However, the extra point attempt was wide, making it a 13–0 lead for Clemson.

Miami retaliated with a touchdown run by Harry Mallios that had been set up by a Smith run of 45 yards. Minutes later, Jim Dooley intercepted a pass from Hair, which Miami took advantage of by scoring on a 95-yard touchdown drive to lead, 14–13.

With six minutes to go in the game, Mallios returned a punt that seemed to be a 79-yard touchdown run to put the game out of reach. However, a clipping penalty was called on Miami, putting them back at their own five-yard-line. Two additional gains by Miami were also nullified by penalties. On a play from the four-yard-line, Miami halfback Frank Smith was tackled by Clemson lineman Sterling Smith behind the goal line for a safety, giving Clemson a 15–14 lead and ultimately the win.

== Aftermath ==
Though Miami made five bowl games in the next 16 years, they did not reach an Orange Bowl again until 1984. Clemson played in the Orange Bowl six years later, in 1957, though they did not win one until 1982.

== Statistics ==
Statistics	Clemson	Miami
First downs	19	7
Total offense	322	212
Rushing (att.–yards)	57–144	31–112
Passing yards	178	100
Passing (comp.–att.–int.)	9–18–3	5–15–4
Punts–avg.	4–30	5–40.2
Fumbles–lost	3–1	0–0
Penalties–yards	2–20	5–55
