= 1950 college football season =

American college football season

- First AP No. 1 of season: Notre Dame
- Number of bowls: 9
- Champion(s): Oklahoma (AP, Coaches)
- Heisman: Vic Janowicz (halfback, Ohio State)

The 1950 college football season was the 82nd season of intercollegiate football in the United States. It concluded with four teams having a claim to the national championship:

- Oklahoma finished the regular season undefeated (9–0) and was recognized as the national champion in the final Associated Press (AP) poll and the final United Press (UP) coaches poll. However, the Sooners lost to Kentucky in the Sugar Bowl on New Year's Day. The final polls were issued prior to the bowl games, leaving intact Oklahoma's claim as AP and UP national champion.
- Tennessee compiled an 11–1 record including a victory over No. 3 Texas in the Cotton Bowl. The Volunteers were ranked No. 4 in the final AP Poll but have been recognized as the 1950 national champion by the Billingsley Report, DeVold System, Dunkel System, College Football Researchers Association, and National Championship Foundation.
- Princeton compiled a perfect 9–0 record and was ranked No. 6 in the final AP Poll. The Tigers have been recognized as the national champions by the Poling System and Boand System. Princeton coach Charlie Caldwell won the AFCA Coach of the Year Award.
- Kentucky, coached by Bear Bryant, compiled an 11–1 record and defeated Oklahoma in the Sugar Bowl. Kentucky claims the 1950 national championship based on its No. 1 ranking in computer rankings released in 1990 by Jeff Sagarin. Kentucky quarterback Babe Parilli tallied 1,627 passing yards and finished fourth in voting for the 1950 Heisman Trophy.

Florida A&M (8–1–1) and Southern (10–0–1) were each recognized as black college national champions by at least one selector. In addition to Princeton, 16 other teams finished the season undefeated and untied, including Abilene Christian (11–0, Texas Conference and Refrigerator Bowl champion), Wyoming (10–0, AP No. 12 and Gator Bowl champion), Morris Harvey (10–0, Tangerine Bowl champion), Lehigh (9–0, Middle Three champion), Florida State (8–0, Dixie Conference champion), New Hampshire (8–0, Yankee Conference champion), and Maryland State (8–0 Furniture Bowl champion).

Ohio State halfback Vic Janowicz won the Heisman Trophy, and Penn halfback Reds Bagnell won the Maxwell Award. Individual statistical leaders in major college football included Johnny Bright of Drake (2,400 yards of total offense), Don Heinrich of Washington (1,846 passing yards), Wilford White of Arizona State (1,501 rushing yards), and Bobby Reynolds of Nebraska (157 points scored).

== Conference and program changes ==
=== Conference changes ===
- One conference began play during 1950:
  - Oregon Collegiate Conference – a conference active through the 1965 season; also known as the Oregon Intercollegiate Conference

=== Membership changes ===
School	1949 conference	1950 conference
Butler Bulldogs	MAC	Independent
Idaho State Bengals	Independent	Rocky Mountain
Montana Grizzlies	PCC	Independent
Portland Pilots	Independent	Dropped Program
Saint Louis Billikens	Missouri Valley	Dropped Program
West Virginia Mountaineers	Independent	SoCon

== Season chronology ==
=== September ===
In the preseason AP poll released on September 25, 1950, the defending champion Fighting Irish of Notre Dame were the overwhelming choice for first, with 101 of 123 first place votes. Far behind were No. 2 Army, No. 3 Michigan, No. 4 Tennessee and No. 5 Texas (which had won at Texas Tech 28–14). As the regular season progressed, a new poll would be issued on the Monday following the weekend's games.

On September 30 No. 1 Notre Dame beat No. 20 North Carolina 14–7. No. 2 Army beat Colgate 28–0, No. 3 Michigan lost to No. 19 Michigan State 14–7. No. 4 Tennessee lost at Mississippi State, 7–0. No. 5 Texas beat Purdue, 34–26, but fell to 7th. No. 6 Oklahoma beat Boston College 28–0. No. 10 SMU, which had already beaten Georgia Tech 33–13, defeated No. 11 Ohio State 32–27. The next AP Poll featured No. 1 Notre Dame, No. 2 Michigan State, No. 3 SMU, No. 4 Army, and No. 5 Oklahoma.

=== October ===
October 7 No. 1 Notre Dame lost to Purdue, 28–14, and eventually finished with a 4–4–1 record. No. 2 Michigan State lost to Maryland, 34–7. No. 3 SMU won at Missouri 21–0. No. 4 Army beat Penn State 41–7 and was elevated to the first spot in the next poll. No. 5 Oklahoma beat Texas A&M 34–28. No. 6 Kentucky registered a fourth shutout and a 4–0 record, with a 40–0 win against Dayton. No. 7 Texas, which was idle, rose to 4th place behind Army, SMU, and Oklahoma and ahead of Kentucky.

October 14 No. 1 Army beat No. 18 Michigan 27–6 at Yankee Stadium. No. 2 SMU beat Oklahoma A&M 56–0. No. 3 Oklahoma and No. 4 Texas met in Dallas, with Oklahoma winning narrowly, 14–13. No. 5 Kentucky beat Cincinnati 41–7. No. 7 California, which had beaten USC 13–7, rose to 5th in the next poll behind Army, Oklahoma, SMU, and Kentucky.

October 21 All of the top five teams stayed undefeated with blowout victories. No. 1 Army won at Harvard 49–0. No. 2 Oklahoma beat Kansas State 58–0. In Houston, No. 3 SMU beat No. 15 Rice 42–21. In Philadelphia, No. 4 Kentucky beat Villanova 34–7. No. 5 California beat Oregon State in Portland 27–0. With their victory over a ranked opponent, SMU jumped to No. 1 in the next poll, ahead of Army, Oklahoma, Kentucky, and California.

October 28 No. 1 SMU was idle. No. 2 Army won at Columbia 34–0. No. 3 Oklahoma won at Iowa State 20–7. In Atlanta, No. 4 Kentucky beat Georgia Tech 28–14. No. 5 California beat St. Mary's 40–25, but still dropped in the next poll. They were replaced in the top five by No. 6 Ohio State, which had lost only to SMU and had just beaten Iowa 83–21; eventual Heisman winner Vic Janowicz accounted for six touchdowns and kicked eight extra points in the Iowa game. The Buckeyes were elevated to No. 4 behind SMU, Army, and Oklahoma and ahead of Kentucky.

=== November ===
November 4 No. 1 SMU lost at No. 7 Texas, 23–20. No. 2 Army won at No. 15 Pennsylvania 28–13. No. 3 Oklahoma won at Colorado 27–18. No. 4 Ohio State won at Northwestern 32–0. No. 5 Kentucky beat No. 17 Florida 40–6. No. 7 Texas beat SMU 23–20, and returned to fifth place behind Army, Ohio State, Oklahoma, and Kentucky.

November 11 No. 1 Army beat New Mexico 51–0. No. 2 Ohio State beat No. 15 Wisconsin 19–14. No. 3 Oklahoma won at No. 19 Kansas, 33–13. No. 4 Kentucky won at Mississippi State, 48–21. No. 5 Texas beat Baylor 27–20. No. 6 California, moved to 7–0–0 after a 35–0 win against No. 19 UCLA. The next AP Poll elevated Ohio State to No. 1 and Oklahoma to No. 2, with Army falling to 3rd even though they received the largest number of first-place votes. California moved up to No. 4, ahead of Kentucky and Texas.

November 18 No. 1 Ohio State lost at No. 8 Illinois, 14–7. No. 2 Oklahoma beat Missouri 41–7. No. 3 Army won at Stanford 7–0. No. 4 California defeated San Francisco 13–7. No. 5 Kentucky handed visiting North Dakota an 83–0 defeat to extend its record to 9–0–0, but still faced a final game against No. 9 Tennessee, whose only loss was by a single touchdown. No. 6 Texas won at TCU 21–7. The next poll featured No. 1 Oklahoma, No. 2 Army, No. 3 Kentucky, No. 4 California, and No. 5 Texas.

November 25 No. 1 Oklahoma beat No. 16 Nebraska 49–35. No. 2 Army was idle as it prepared for the Army–Navy Game. No. 3 Kentucky lost at No. 9 Tennessee, 7–0. No. 4 California and unranked Stanford played to a 7–7 tie in Berkeley. No. 5 Texas beat Texas A&M 21–6. Michigan beat No. 8 Ohio State in the famous Snow Bowl 9–3 and earned a berth in the Rose Bowl against California. The final AP poll was released on November 27, although some colleges had not completed their schedules. Undefeated Oklahoma and Army were chosen as No. 1 and No. 2, with Texas (whose only loss was to Oklahoma by one point) at No. 3. Tennessee and California rounded out the top five, with undefeated Princeton at No. 6 and Kentucky moving down to No. 7 after their loss to Tennessee.

On December 2, with its champion status assured, No. 1 Oklahoma beat Oklahoma A&M 41–14. No. 2 Army (9–0–0) was heavily favored to beat unranked, and 2–6–0, Navy. Instead, the Philadelphia game turned into a 14–2 win for the Midshipmen. No. 3 Texas played a game on December 9, beating LSU 21–6. The Coaches Poll, which waited until the end of the regular season to release its final rankings, kept Oklahoma at No. 1 but dropped Army to No. 5 behind Texas, Tennessee, and California.

== Conference standings ==
=== Major conference standings ===
1950 Big Ten Conference football standings
	Conf.					Overall
Team	W		L		T	W		L		T
No. 9 Michigan $	4	–	1	–	1	6	–	3	–	1
No. 14 Ohio State	5	–	2	–	0	6	–	3	–	0
Wisconsin	5	–	2	–	0	6	–	3	–	0
No. 13 Illinois	4	–	2	–	0	7	–	2	–	0
Northwestern	3	–	3	–	0	6	–	3	–	0
Iowa	2	–	4	–	0	3	–	5	–	1
Minnesota	1	–	4	–	1	1	–	7	–	1
Indiana	1	–	4	–	0	3	–	5	–	1
Purdue	1	–	4	–	0	2	–	7	–	0
$ – Conference champion; Rankings from AP Poll

1950 Big Seven Conference football standings
	Conf.					Overall
Team	W		L		T	W		L		T
No. 1 Oklahoma $	6	–	0	–	0	10	–	1	–	0
No. 17 Nebraska	4	–	2	–	0	6	–	2	–	1
Missouri	3	–	2	–	1	4	–	5	–	1
Kansas	3	–	3	–	0	6	–	4	–	0
Iowa State	2	–	3	–	1	3	–	6	–	1
Colorado	2	–	4	–	0	5	–	4	–	1
Kansas State	0	–	6	–	0	1	–	9	–	1
$ – Conference champion; Rankings from AP Poll

1950 Border Conference football standings
	Conf.					Overall
Team	W		L		T	W		L		T
West Texas State $	6	–	0	–	0	10	–	1	–	0
Arizona State	4	–	1	–	0	9	–	2	–	0
Texas Western	4	–	2	–	0	7	–	3	–	0
Texas Tech	3	–	2	–	0	3	–	8	–	0
Hardin–Simmons	3	–	3	–	0	5	–	5	–	0
Arizona	2	–	4	–	0	4	–	6	–	0
New Mexico	2	–	5	–	0	2	–	8	–	0
New Mexico A&M	1	–	4	–	0	2	–	7	–	0
Arizona State–Flagstaff	0	–	4	–	0	2	–	7	–	0
$ – Conference champion

1950 Mid-American Conference football standings
	Conf.					Overall
Team	W		L		T	W		L		T
Miami (OH) $	4	–	0	–	0	9	–	1	–	0
Cincinnati	3	–	1	–	0	8	–	4	–	0
Ohio	2	–	2	–	0	6	–	4	–	0
Western Reserve	1	–	3	–	0	2	–	8	–	0
Western Michigan	1	–	3	–	0	5	–	4	–	0
$ – Conference champion

1950 Middle Three Conference football standings
	Conf.					Overall
Team	W		L		T	W		L		T
Lehigh $	2	–	0	–	0	9	–	0	–	0
Rutgers	1	–	1	–	0	4	–	4	–	0
Lafayette	0	–	2	–	0	1	–	8	–	0
$ – Conference champion

1950 Missouri Valley Conference football standings
	Conf.					Overall
Team	W		L		T	W		L		T
No. 19 Tulsa $	3	–	0	–	1	9	–	1	–	1
Detroit	2	–	1	–	1	6	–	3	–	1
Wichita	3	–	2	–	0	5	–	4	–	1
Drake	1	–	2	–	1	6	–	2	–	1
Oklahoma A&M	1	–	2	–	1	4	–	6	–	1
Bradley	0	–	3	–	0	5	–	5	–	0
$ – Conference champion; Rankings from AP Poll

1950 Pacific Coast Conference football standings
	Conf.					Overall
Team	W		L		T	W		L		T
No. 5 California $	5	–	0	–	1	9	–	1	–	1
No. 11 Washington	6	–	1	–	0	8	–	2	–	0
UCLA	5	–	2	–	0	6	–	3	–	0
Stanford	2	–	2	–	2	5	–	3	–	2
Idaho	1	–	1	–	1	3	–	5	–	1
Washington State	2	–	3	–	2	4	–	3	–	2
USC	1	–	3	–	2	2	–	5	–	2
Oregon State	2	–	5	–	0	3	–	6	–	0
Oregon	0	–	7	–	0	1	–	9	–	0
$ – Conference champion; Rankings from AP Poll

1950 Skyline Conference football standings
	Conf.					Overall
Team	W		L		T	W		L		T
No. 12 Wyoming $	5	–	0	–	0	10	–	0	–	0
Colorado A&M	4	–	1	–	0	6	–	3	–	0
Denver	2	–	2	–	1	3	–	8	–	1
Utah	1	–	2	–	2	3	–	4	–	3
BYU	1	–	3	–	1	4	–	5	–	1
Utah State	0	–	5	–	0	2	–	9	–	0
$ – Conference champion; Rankings from AP Poll

1950 Southeastern Conference football standings
	Conf.					Overall
Team	W		L		T	W		L		T
No. 7 Kentucky $	5	–	1	–	0	11	–	1	–	0
No. 4 Tennessee	4	–	1	–	0	11	–	1	–	0
No. 16 Alabama	6	–	2	–	0	9	–	2	–	0
No. 20 Tulane	3	–	1	–	1	6	–	2	–	1
Georgia Tech	4	–	2	–	0	5	–	6	–	0
Georgia	3	–	2	–	1	6	–	3	–	3
Mississippi State	3	–	4	–	0	4	–	5	–	0
Vanderbilt	3	–	4	–	0	7	–	4	–	0
LSU	2	–	3	–	2	4	–	5	–	2
Florida	2	–	4	–	0	5	–	5	–	0
Ole Miss	1	–	5	–	0	5	–	5	–	0
Auburn	0	–	7	–	0	0	–	10	–	0
$ – Conference champion; Rankings from AP Poll

1950 Southern Conference football standings
	Conf.					Overall
Team	W		L		T	W		L		T
No. 18 Washington and Lee $	6	–	0	–	0	8	–	3	–	0
No. 10 Clemson	3	–	0	–	1	9	–	0	–	1
VMI	5	–	1	–	0	6	–	4	–	0
Wake Forest	6	–	1	–	1	6	–	1	–	2
Maryland	4	–	1	–	1	7	–	2	–	1
Duke	5	–	2	–	0	7	–	3	–	0
North Carolina	3	–	2	–	1	3	–	5	–	2
George Washington	4	–	3	–	0	5	–	4	–	0
NC State	4	–	4	–	1	5	–	4	–	1
William & Mary	3	–	3	–	0	4	–	7	–	0
The Citadel	2	–	3	–	0	4	–	6	–	0
South Carolina	2	–	4	–	1	3	–	4	–	2
Furman	2	–	4	–	0	2	–	8	–	1
West Virginia	1	–	3	–	0	2	–	8	–	0
Davidson	1	–	5	–	0	3	–	6	–	0
Richmond	1	–	8	–	0	2	–	8	–	0
VPI	0	–	8	–	0	0	–	10	–	0
$ – Conference champion; Rankings from AP Poll

1950 Southwest Conference football standings
	Conf.					Overall
Team	W		L		T	W		L		T
No. 3 Texas $	6	–	0	–	0	9	–	2	–	0
Baylor	4	–	2	–	0	7	–	3	–	0
Texas A&M	3	–	3	–	0	7	–	4	–	0
TCU	3	–	3	–	0	5	–	5	–	0
Rice	2	–	4	–	0	6	–	4	–	0
SMU	2	–	4	–	0	6	–	4	–	0
Arkansas	1	–	5	–	0	2	–	8	–	0
$ – Conference champion; Rankings from AP Poll

=== Independents ===
1950 Eastern college football independents records
	Conf.			Overall
Team	W	L	T	W		L		T
Franklin & Marshall		–		9	–	0	–	0
No. 6 Princeton		–		9	–	0	–	0
St. Lawrence		–		8	–	0	–	0
Thiel		–		7	–	0	–	0
No. 2 Army		–		8	–	1	–	0
Fordham		–		8	–	1	–	0
Carnegie Tech		–		7	–	1	–	0
Drexel		–		6	–	1	–	0
Cornell		–		7	–	2	–	0
Gannon		–		6	–	2	–	0
Bucknell		–		6	–	3	–	0
Penn		–		6	–	3	–	0
Yale		–		6	–	3	–	0
Buffalo		–		5	–	3	–	0
Colgate		–		5	–	3	–	0
Penn State		–		5	–	3	–	1
Syracuse		–		5	–	5	–	0
Temple		–		4	–	4	–	1
Tufts		–		4	–	4	–	1
Columbia		–		4	–	5	–	0
Villanova		–		4	–	5	–	0
Holy Cross		–		4	–	5	–	1
Dartmouth		–		3	–	5	–	1
Boston University		–		3	–	5	–	0
Duquesne		–		2	–	6	–	1
Hofstra		–		2	–	6	–	0
NYU		–		1	–	5	–	1
CCNY		–		1	–	7	–	0
Harvard		–		1	–	7	–	0
Brown		–		1	–	8	–	0
Pittsburgh		–		1	–	8	–	0
Boston College		–		0	–	9	–	1
Rankings from AP Poll

1950 Midwestern college football independents records
	Conf.			Overall
Team	W	L	T	W		L		T
Valparaiso		–		9	–	1	–	0
No. 8 Michigan State		–		8	–	1	–	0
Xavier		–		8	–	1	–	0
John Carroll		–		8	–	2	–	0
Baldwin–Wallace		–		5	–	2	–	1
Michigan Tech		–		4	–	2	–	1
Marquette		–		5	–	3	–	1
Wabash		–		4	–	2	–	3
Butler		–		4	–	4	–	1
Notre Dame		–		4	–	4	–	1
Toledo		–		4	–	5	–	0
Bowling Green		–		3	–	4	–	2
Dayton		–		4	–	6	–	0
Youngstown		–		3	–	5	–	0
Ball State		–		2	–	4	–	1
Washington University		–		2	–	7	–	0
Wayne		–		2	–	7	–	0
Indiana State		–		1	–	7	–	1
Rose Poly		–		0	–	8	–	0
Rankings from AP Poll

1950 Southern college football independents records
	Conf.			Overall
Team	W	L	T	W		L		T
Maryland State		–		8	–	0	–	0
No. 15 Miami (FL)		–		9	–	1	–	1
Memphis State		–		9	–	2	–	0
Virginia		–		8	–	2	–	0
Tampa		–		5	–	4	–	0
Grambling		–		5	–	4	–	1
Texas State		–		5	–	5	–	1
Houston		–		4	–	6	–	0
Louisville		–		3	–	6	–	1
Navy		–		3	–	6	–	0
Sewanee		–		3	–	6	–	0
Delaware		–		2	–	5	–	1
Georgetown		–		2	–	7	–	0
Chattanooga		–		1	–	9	–	0
Rankings from AP Poll

1950 Western college football independents records
	Conf.			Overall
Team	W	L	T	W		L		T
Loyola (CA)		–		8	–	1	–	0
Pacific (CA)		–		7	–	3	–	1
San Francisco		–		7	–	4	–	0
San Jose State		–		6	–	3	–	1
Hawaii		–		5	–	4	–	2
Montana		–		5	–	5	–	0
La Verne		–		3	–	5	–	0
Santa Clara		–		3	–	7	–	0
Saint Mary's		–		2	–	7	–	1
Cal Poly San Dimas		–		1	–	6	–	1
Nevada		–		1	–	9	–	0

=== Minor conferences ===
Conference	Champion(s)	Record
Alabama Intercollegiate Conference	Florence State	6–3–1
California Collegiate Athletic Association	San Diego State	3–0–1
Central Intercollegiate Athletics Association	North Carolina A&T	5–0–1
Central Intercollegiate Athletic Conference	Kansas State Teachers	5–0
College Conference of Illinois	Wheaton (IL)	5–0
Evergreen Conference	Eastern Washington College	5–1
Far Western Conference	San Francisco State	4–0
Gulf Coast Conference	North Texas State; Midwestern State	1–0–1
Iowa Intercollegiate Athletic Conference	Saint Ambrose	5–0
Kansas Collegiate Athletic Conference	Ottawa	6–0
Lone Star Conference	Sul Ross State College	3–0–1
Michigan Intercollegiate Athletic Association	Alma	4–0–1
Mid-American Conference	Miami (OH)	4–0
Midwest Collegiate Athletic Conference	Coe; Knox; Ripon	5–1
Minnesota Intercollegiate Athletic Conference	Gustavus Adolphus	6–0
Missouri Intercollegiate Athletic Association	Missouri School of Mines	4–1
Nebraska College Conference	Doane	4–1–1
New Mexico Intercollegiate Conference	Eastern New Mexico	5–1
North Central Intercollegiate Athletic Conference	South Dakota State	5–0–1
North Dakota College Athletic Conference	Valley City State	4–0
Ohio Athletic Conference	Muskingum	6–0
Ohio Valley Conference	Murray State	5–0–1
Oklahoma Collegiate Athletic Conference	Central State College (OK); Southwestern State Teachers (OK)	4–1
Oregon Collegiate Conference	Oregon College	—
Pennsylvania State Athletic Conference	West Chester State Teachers	4–0
Pacific Northwest Conference	Lewis & Clark	5–0
Rocky Mountain Athletic Conference	Colorado College	5–0
South Dakota Intercollegiate Conference	Northern State Teachers (SD)	4–0
Southern California Intercollegiate Athletic Conference	Pomona-Pitzer; Redlands; Whittier	3–1
Southern Intercollegiate Athletic Conference	Florida A&M College; Xavier (LA)	6–0
Southwestern Athletic Conference	Southern	7–0
State Teacher's College Conference of Minnesota	Bemidji State Teachers; Mankato State Teachers	3–0–1
Texas Collegiate Athletic Conference	Abilene Christian	5–0
Upper Peninsula Conference	Northern Michigan	4-3
Wisconsin State Teachers College Conference	La Crosse State Teachers; Whitewater State Teachers	4–0; 4–0

=== Minor conference standings ===
1950 Badger-Illini Conference football standings
	Conf.					Overall
Team	W		L		T	W		L		T
Mission House $	6	–	0	–	0	6	–	0	–	0
Northwestern (WI)	5	–	1	–	0	5	–	1	–	0
Wisconsin–Extension	4	–	1	–	1	4	–	1	–	1
Milton	2	–	3	–	1	2	–	3	–	2
Concordia (IL)	1	–	3	–	1	2	–	4	–	1
St. Procopius	2	–	5	–	0	2	–	5	–	0
Wisconsin Tech	1	–	4	–	1	1	–	5	–	1
Aurora	1	–	5	–	0	1	–	6	–	0
$ – Conference champion

1950 California Collegiate Athletic Association football standings
	Conf.					Overall
Team	W		L		T	W		L		T
San Diego State $	3	–	0	–	1	5	–	3	–	1
Santa Barbara	3	–	1	–	0	7	–	3	–	0
Pepperdine	2	–	2	–	0	4	–	5	–	0
Fresno State	1	–	2	–	1	2	–	6	–	1
Cal Poly	0	–	4	–	0	3	–	7	–	0
$ – Conference champion

1950 Central Intercollegiate Conference football standings
	Conf.					Overall
Team	W		L		T	W		L		T
Emporia State $	5	–	0	–	0	6	–	2	–	1
Pittsburg State	4	–	1	–	0	5	–	5	–	0
Washburn	2	–	2	–	1	3	–	4	–	1
St. Benedict's	1	–	3	–	1	4	–	4	–	1
Fort Hays State	0	–	3	–	2	3	–	4	–	2
Southwestern (KS)	0	–	3	–	2	3	–	4	–	2
$ – Conference champion

1950 College Conference of Illinois football standings
	Conf.					Overall
Team	W		L		T	W		L		T
Wheaton (IL) $	5	–	0	–	0	7	–	2	–	0
Illinois Wesleyan	5	–	1	–	0	5	–	3	–	0
Millikin	4	–	1	–	0	4	–	4	–	0
Lake Forest	3	–	2	–	0	3	–	4	–	1
North Central (IL)	2	–	3	–	0	4	–	4	–	0
Elmhurst	1	–	4	–	0	3	–	5	–	0
Illinois College	1	–	4	–	0	3	–	5	–	0
Augustana (IL)	1	–	4	–	0	2	–	6	–	0
Carthage	1	–	4	–	0	2	–	7	–	0
$ – Conference champion

1950 Colored Intercollegiate Athletic Association football standings
	Conf.					Overall
Team	W		L		T	W		L		T
No. 6 North Carolina A&T $	5	–	0	–	1	6	–	2	–	1
No. 9 North Carolina College	6	–	1	–	0	7	–	2	–	0
No. 8 Morgan State	5	–	0	–	2	6	–	0	–	2
No. 11 West Virginia State	3	–	2	–	1	5	–	3	–	1
No. 9 St. Augustine's	6	–	1	–	0	8	–	1	–	0
No. 16 Bluefield State	4	–	2	–	1	6	–	3	–	1
Virginia Union	6	–	3	–	0	6	–	3	–	0
No. 25 Howard	5	–	4	–	0	5	–	4	–	0
Lincoln (PA)	2	–	3	–	1	3	–	3	–	1
Virginia State	3	–	5	–	0	3	–	5	–	0
Winston-Salem State	2	–	3	–	2	2	–	3	–	2
Johnson C. Smith	2	–	4	–	1	2	–	5	–	1
Hampton	2	–	5	–	0	2	–	7	–	0
Delaware State	2	–	6	–	1	2	–	7	–	1
Shaw	1	–	8	–	0	1	–	8	–	0
Saint Paul's (VA)	0	–	7	–	0	0	–	7	–	0
$ – Conference champion; Conference standings were based on the Dickinson System.; Rankings from the Pittsburgh Courier

1950 Eastern Intercollegiate Athletic Conference football standings
	Conf.					Overall
Team	W		L		T	W		L		T
Morristown *	3	–	0	–	0	5	–	1	–	1
Norfolk State $	4	–	0	–	1	5	–	2	–	1
Elizabeth City State	2	–	1	–	2	4	–	2	–	2
Fayetteville State *	1	–	1	–	1	4	–	5	–	1
Miner Teachers	2	–	2	–	0	?	–	?	–	?
Virginia Seminary	1	–	3	–	0	2	–	4	–	0
Livingstone	0	–	4	–	0	0	–	6	–	1
Storer *	0	–	2	–	0	?	–	?	–	?
$ – Conference champion; * – Did not play enough conference games to be eligible for championship Standings were based on Dickinson System ratings.

1950 Evergreen Conference football standings
	Conf.					Overall
Team	W		L		T	W		L		T
Eastern Washington $	5	–	1	–	0	8	–	2	–	0
Western Washington	4	–	1	–	1	7	–	2	–	1
Pacific Lutheran	3	–	2	–	1	4	–	3	–	1
Puget Sound	2	–	2	–	2	3	–	3	–	3
Whitworth	2	–	4	–	0	4	–	3	–	1
Saint Martin's	1	–	4	–	1	2	–	5	–	1
Central Washington	1	–	4	–	1	1	–	7	–	1
$ – Conference champion

1950 Far Western Conference football standings
	Conf.					Overall
Team	W		L		T	W		L		T
San Francisco State $	4	–	0	–	0	6	–	2	–	0
Cal Aggies	3	–	1	–	0	3	–	5	–	0
Chico State	2	–	2	–	0	2	–	6	–	0
Southern Oregon	1	–	3	–	0	3	–	7	–	0
Humboldt State	0	–	4	–	0	0	–	4	–	1
$ – Conference champion

1950 Gulf Coast Conference football standings
	Conf.					Overall
Team	W		L		T	W		L		T
North Texas State +	1	–	0	–	1	7	–	2	–	1
Midwestern (TX) +	1	–	0	–	1	4	–	5	–	1
Trinity (TX)	0	–	2	–	0	5	–	4	–	1
+ – Conference co-champions

1950 Gulf States Conference football standings
	Conf.					Overall
Team	W		L		T	W		L		T
Mississippi Southern $	3	–	1	–	0	5	–	5	–	0
Louisiana Tech	3	–	2	–	0	5	–	4	–	1
Louisiana College	2	–	2	–	0	5	–	5	–	0
Northwestern State	2	–	3	–	0	6	–	4	–	0
Southeastern Louisiana	2	–	3	–	0	6	–	4	–	0
Southwestern Louisiana	2	–	3	–	0	5	–	4	–	0
$ – Conference champion

1950 Hoosier Conference football standings
	Conf.					Overall
Team	W		L		T	W		L		T
Canterbury $	6	–	0	–	0	8	–	0	–	0
Anderson (IN)	4	–	1	–	1	4	–	3	–	2
Hanover	3	–	2	–	0	3	–	5	–	1
Taylor	3	–	2	–	0	5	–	4	–	0
Indiana Central	2	–	4	–	1	3	–	5	–	1
Manchester (IN)	2	–	4	–	0	3	–	6	–	0
Earlham	1	–	4	–	0	3	–	5	–	0
Franklin (IN)	1	–	5	–	0	2	–	7	–	0
$ – Conference champion

1950 Interstate Intercollegiate Athletic Conference football standings
	Conf.					Overall
Team	W		L		T	W		L		T
Illinois State Normal $	5	–	0	–	1	7	–	1	–	2
Western Illinois	4	–	1	–	0	7	–	1	–	0
Central Michigan	2	–	2	–	0	6	–	4	–	0
Eastern Illinois	2	–	2	–	0	5	–	3	–	0
Northern Illinois State	2	–	4	–	0	3	–	6	–	0
Southern Illinois	1	–	3	–	1	3	–	5	–	1
Michigan State Normal	0	–	4	–	0	3	–	6	–	0
$ – Conference champion

1950 Iowa Conference football standings
	Conf.					Overall
Team	W		L		T	W		L		T
Northern Division
Loras xy	5	–	0	–	0	8	–	3	–	0
Upper Iowa	4	–	1	–	0	5	–	3	–	0
Buena Vista	3	–	2	–	0	6	–	3	–	0
Westmar	2	–	3	–	0	3	–	6	–	0
Luther	1	–	4	–	0	1	–	7	–	0
Wartburg	0	–	5	–	0	1	–	8	–	0
Southern Division
St. Ambrose xy$	5	–	0	–	0	12	–	1	–	0
Parsons	4	–	1	–	0	6	–	2	–	0
Iowa Wesleyan	3	–	2	–	0	4	–	5	–	0
Dubuque	1	–	4	–	0	3	–	5	–	0
Simpson (IA)	1	–	4	–	0	3	–	6	–	0
Central (IA)	1	–	4	–	0	2	–	7	–	0
Championship: St. Ambrose 27, Loras 6
$ – Conference champion; x – Division champion/co-champions; y – Championship game participant

1950 Kansas Collegiate Athletic Conference football standings
	Conf.					Overall
Team	W		L		T	W		L		T
Ottawa $	6	–	0	–	0	7	–	2	–	0
Baker	5	–	1	–	0	6	–	3	–	0
Kansas Wesleyan	3	–	2	–	1	3	–	6	–	1
Bethany (KS)	2	–	3	–	1	3	–	5	–	1
McPherson	2	–	4	–	0	3	–	5	–	0
College of Emporia	2	–	4	–	0	2	–	7	–	0
Bethel (KS)	0	–	6	–	0	1	–	8	–	0
$ – Conference champion

1950 Lone Star Conference football standings
	Conf.					Overall
Team	W		L		T	W		L		T
Sul Ross $	3	–	0	–	1	8	–	2	–	1
Southwest Texas State	2	–	2	–	0	6	–	3	–	0
Stephen F. Austin	2	–	2	–	0	5	–	5	–	0
East Texas State	1	–	2	–	1	4	–	5	–	2
Sam Houston State	1	–	3	–	0	5	–	5	–	0
$ – Conference champion

1950 Mason–Dixon Conference football standings
	Conf.					Overall
Team	W		L		T	W		L		T
Randolph–Macon $	4	–	0	–	0	5	–	4	–	0
Western Maryland	3	–	0	–	0	6	–	2	–	0
Washington College	3	–	1	–	0	5	–	3	–	0
Mount St. Mary's	1	–	1	–	0	1	–	5	–	1
Gallaudet	1	–	1	–	0	1	–	4	–	0
Catholic University	2	–	3	–	1	2	–	3	–	1
Hampden–Sydney	1	–	3	–	0	4	–	5	–	0
Johns Hopkins	0	–	2	–	1	3	–	4	–	1
Bridgewater	0	–	4	–	0	0	–	6	–	0
$ – Conference champion; Conference standings were based on the Dickinson Scoring System.

1950 Michigan Intercollegiate Athletic Association football standings
	Conf.					Overall
Team	W		L		T	W		L		T
Alma $	4	–	0	–	1	6	–	2	–	1
Kalamazoo	4	–	1	–	0	5	–	4	–	0
Albion	2	–	2	–	1	6	–	2	–	1
Hope	2	–	2	–	1	4	–	3	–	1
Hillsdale	1	–	3	–	1	2	–	6	–	1
Adrian	0	–	5	–	0	2	–	6	–	0
$ – Conference champion

1950 Mid-Ohio League football standings
	Conf.					Overall
Team	W		L		T	W		L		T
Ohio Northern $	5	–	0	–	0	9	–	1	–	0
Ashland	3	–	1	–	1	5	–	3	–	1
Findlay	3	–	1	–	1	3	–	4	–	1
Bluffton	2	–	3	–	0	4	–	4	–	0
Defiance	1	–	4	–	0	3	–	6	–	0
Cedarville	0	–	5	–	0	1	–	8	–	0
$ – Conference champion

1950 Midlands Conference football standings
	Conf.					Overall
Team	W		L		T	W		L		T
St. Norbert $	4	–	0	–	0	7	–	0	–	0
St. Ambrose	3	–	1	–	0	12	–	1	–	0
Loras	1	–	2	–	0	8	–	3	–	0
Lewis	1	–	2	–	0	4	–	4	–	0
Saint Joseph's (IN)	0	–	4	–	0	1	–	6	–	1
$ – Conference champion

1950 Midwest Athletic Association football standings
	Conf.					Overall
Team	W		L		T	W		L		T
No. 12 Wilberforce State $	3	–	0	–	0	6	–	4	–	0
No. 4 Tennessee A&I	2	–	1	–	0	9	–	2	–	0
Kentucky State	1	–	2	–	0	4	–	5	–	1
Lincoln (MO)	0	–	3	–	0	1	–	7	–	0
$ – Conference champion; Rankings from the Pittsburgh Courier

1950 Midwest Conference football standings
	Conf.					Overall
Team	W		L		T	W		L		T
Knox +	5	–	1	–	0	6	–	1	–	1
Coe +	5	–	1	–	0	6	–	2	–	0
Ripon +	5	–	1	–	0	6	–	2	–	0
Beloit	4	–	2	–	0	5	–	2	–	1
Carleton	4	–	2	–	0	5	–	3	–	0
Monmouth (IL)	1	–	5	–	0	3	–	5	–	0
Lawrence	1	–	5	–	0	2	–	5	–	0
Cornell (IA)	1	–	5	–	0	2	–	6	–	0
Grinnell	1	–	5	–	0	2	–	6	–	0
+ – Conference co-champions

1950 Minnesota Intercollegiate Athletic Conference football standings
	Conf.					Overall
Team	W		L		T	W		L		T
Gustavus Adolphus $	6	–	0	–	0	9	–	2	–	0
St. Thomas (MN)	5	–	1	–	0	5	–	3	–	0
Hamline	4	–	2	–	0	5	–	2	–	0
Macalester	3	–	2	–	1	5	–	3	–	1
Saint John's (MN)	3	–	3	–	0	4	–	3	–	0
Minnesota–Duluth	3	–	3	–	0	4	–	3	–	0
Concordia (MN)	2	–	4	–	0	3	–	4	–	0
St. Olaf	2	–	4	–	0	2	–	6	–	0
Augsburg	1	–	5	–	0	1	–	5	–	1
Saint Mary's (MN)	0	–	5	–	1	1	–	5	–	1
$ – Conference champion

1950 Minnesota Teachers College Conference football standings
	Conf.					Overall
Team	W		L		T	W		L		T
Bemidji State +	3	–	0	–	1	5	–	1	–	1
Mankato State +	3	–	0	–	1	4	–	3	–	1
St. Cloud State	2	–	2	–	0	4	–	4	–	0
Winona State	1	–	3	–	0	2	–	5	–	0
Moorhead State	0	–	4	–	0	0	–	8	–	0
+ – Conference co-champions; Bemidji State forfeited a conference win over Winona State because of an ineligible player.

1950 Missouri College Athletic Union football standings
	Conf.					Overall
Team	W		L		T	W		L		T
William Jewell $	3	–	0	–	0	8	–	1	–	0
Missouri Valley	2	–	1	–	0	8	–	3	–	0
Central (MO)	0	–	2	–	1	5	–	3	–	1
Culver–Stockton	0	–	2	–	1	3	–	4	–	2
$ – Conference champion

1950 Missouri Intercollegiate Athletic Association football standings
	Conf.					Overall
Team	W		L		T	W		L		T
Missouri Mines $	4	–	1	–	0	7	–	2	–	0
SW Missouri State	3	–	1	–	1	6	–	3	–	1
Central Missouri State	3	–	2	–	0	8	–	3	–	0
SE Missouri State	1	–	3	–	1	4	–	5	–	1
NW Missouri State	1	–	3	–	1	3	–	5	–	1
Kirksville State	0	–	2	–	3	2	–	4	–	3
$ – Conference champion

1950 Montana Collegiate Conference football standings
	Conf.					Overall
Team	W		L		T	W		L		T
Carroll (MT) $	4	–	0	–	0	5	–	2	–	0
Western Montana	3	–	1	–	0	5	–	1	–	0
Eastern Montana	1	–	3	–	0	1	–	4	–	0
Montana Mines	1	–	3	–	0	?	–	?	–	?
Rocky Mountain	1	–	3	–	0	?	–	?	–	?
$ – Conference champion

1950 Nebraska College Conference football standings
	Conf.					Overall
Team	W		L		T	W		L		T
Doane $	4	–	1	–	1	7	–	2	–	1
Peru State	5	–	2	–	0	7	–	2	–	0
Wayne State (NE)	5	–	2	–	0	6	–	3	–	0
Hastings	4	–	2	–	1	5	–	2	–	1
Chadron State	4	–	2	–	1	5	–	4	–	1
Nebraska Wesleyan	4	–	3	–	0	5	–	5	–	0
Kearney State	3	–	5	–	0	4	–	5	–	0
Midland	1	–	6	–	1	2	–	6	–	1
York (NE)	0	–	7	–	0	1	–	9	–	0
$ – Conference champion

1950 New Mexico Conference football standings
	Conf.					Overall
Team	W		L		T	W		L		T
Eastern New Mexico $	5	–	1	–	0	5	–	5	–	0
New Mexico Western	3	–	1	–	1	5	–	3	–	1
Adams State	2	–	2	–	1	2	–	5	–	2
New Mexico Military	2	–	3	–	1	3	–	6	–	1
St. Michael's (NM)	2	–	3	–	0	3	–	4	–	0
New Mexico Highlands	2	–	4	–	0	2	–	5	–	1
Panhandle A&M	1	–	3	–	1	3	–	6	–	1
$ – Conference champion

1950 North Central Conference football standings
	Conf.					Overall
Team	W		L		T	W		L		T
South Dakota State $	5	–	0	–	1	9	–	0	–	1
Iowa State Teachers	4	–	2	–	0	4	–	4	–	0
North Dakota	3	–	1	–	2	5	–	2	–	2
Morningside	3	–	2	–	1	6	–	2	–	1
South Dakota	3	–	3	–	0	4	–	5	–	0
Augustana (SD)	1	–	5	–	0	2	–	7	–	0
North Dakota State	0	–	6	–	0	2	–	7	–	0
$ – Conference champion

1950 North Dakota Intercollegiate Conference football standings
	Conf.					Overall
Team	W		L		T	W		L		T
Valley City State $	4	–	0	–	0	7	–	1	–	0
Minot State	6	–	1	–	0	6	–	2	–	0
Ellendale	4	–	1	–	0	4	–	1	–	0
Dickinson State	4	–	1	–	0	5	–	2	–	1
Wahpeton Science	2	–	3	–	0	3	–	4	–	0
Jamestown	2	–	4	–	0	2	–	6	–	0
Mayville State	1	–	4	–	0	3	–	4	–	0
Bismarck JC	0	–	4	–	0	0	–	4	–	0
Bottineau	0	–	5	–	0	0	–	5	–	0
$ – Conference champion

1950 North State Conference football standings
	Conf.					Overall
Team	W		L		T	W		L		T
Appalachian State $	7	–	0	–	1	9	–	2	–	1
Elon	6	–	1	–	1	7	–	2	–	1
Lenoir Rhyne	6	–	2	–	0	8	–	2	–	0
East Carolina	5	–	2	–	0	7	–	3	–	0
Catawba	2	–	3	–	0	4	–	6	–	0
Guilford	2	–	5	–	0	4	–	5	–	0
Western Carolina	1	–	4	–	0	3	–	6	–	0
Atlantic Christian	0	–	5	–	0	2	–	7	–	0
High Point	0	–	7	–	0	1	–	8	–	0
$ – Conference champion

1950 Northwest Conference football standings
	Conf.					Overall
Team	W		L		T	W		L		T
Lewis & Clark $	5	–	0	–	0	9	–	0	–	0
Pacific (OR)	3	–	2	–	0	7	–	2	–	0
Linfield	3	–	2	–	0	6	–	3	–	0
College of Idaho	2	–	3	–	0	4	–	5	–	0
Willamette	1	–	4	–	0	4	–	4	–	2
Whitman	1	–	4	–	0	3	–	6	–	0
$ – Conference champion

1950 Ohio Valley Conference football standings
	Conf.					Overall
Team	W		L		T	W		L		T
Murray State $	5	–	0	–	1	7	–	2	–	1
Western Kentucky	3	–	1	–	2	6	–	2	–	2
Eastern Kentucky	4	–	2	–	0	6	–	4	–	0
Morehead State	3	–	3	–	0	4	–	4	–	0
Marshall	2	–	4	–	0	2	–	8	–	0
Evansville	1	–	4	–	1	3	–	6	–	1
Tennessee Tech	1	–	5	–	0	4	–	7	–	0
$ – Conference champion

1950 Oklahoma Collegiate Conference football standings
	Conf.					Overall
Team	W		L		T	W		L		T
Central State (OK) +	4	–	1	–	0	7	–	3	–	0
SW Oklahoma State +	4	–	1	–	0	6	–	5	–	0
SE Oklahoma State	2	–	2	–	1	4	–	4	–	2
NW Oklahoma State	2	–	3	–	0	5	–	4	–	0
East Central	2	–	3	–	0	4	–	5	–	0
Northeastern State	0	–	4	–	1	1	–	7	–	1
+ – Conference co-champions

1950 Oregon Collegiate Conference football standings
	Conf.					Overall
Team	W		L		T	W		L		T
Oregon College $	3	–	0	–	0	6	–	2	–	0
Oregon Tech	1	–	1	–	1	2	–	7	–	1
Eastern Oregon	1	–	2	–	0	1	–	8	–	0
Vanport	0	–	2	–	1	1	–	5	–	1
$ – Conference champion

1950 Pennsylvania State Teachers College Conference football standings
	Conf.					Overall
Team	W		L		T	W		L		T
West Chester $	4	–	0	–	0	7	–	2	–	0
Bloomsburg	6	–	1	–	0	7	–	1	–	0
Shippensburg	5	–	1	–	1	7	–	1	–	1
Lock Haven	3	–	2	–	0	5	–	4	–	0
East Stroudsburg	2	–	1	–	1	4	–	3	–	1
Indiana (PA)	4	–	4	–	1	4	–	4	–	1
California (PA)	2	–	2	–	0	7	–	2	–	0
Slippery Rock	2	–	2	–	0	3	–	5	–	0
Edinboro	2	–	3	–	0	3	–	4	–	0
Millersville	2	–	5	–	0	2	–	6	–	0
Clarion	1	–	3	–	0	2	–	5	–	0
Kutztown	0	–	3	–	1	5	–	3	–	1
Mansfield	0	–	6	–	0	1	–	8	–	0
$ – Conference champion

1950 Rocky Mountain Conference football standings
	Conf.					Overall
Team	W		L		T	W		L		T
Colorado College $	5	–	0	–	0	9	–	1	–	0
Colorado State–Greeley	3	–	2	–	0	6	–	2	–	1
Idaho State	3	–	2	–	0	4	–	4	–	0
Western State (CO)	2	–	3	–	0	4	–	4	–	0
Montana State	1	–	3	–	0	1	–	8	–	0
Colorado Mines	0	–	4	–	0	3	–	6	–	0
$ – Conference champion

1950 Smoky Mountain Conference football standings
	Conf.					Overall
Team	W		L		T	W		L		T
Emory and Henry $	4	–	0	–	0	10	–	2	–	0
Carson–Newman	2	–	1	–	1	3	–	5	–	1
Milligan	1	–	1	–	2	3	–	4	–	2
East Tennessee State	1	–	2	–	1	3	–	5	–	1
Tusculum	0	–	4	–	0	2	–	6	–	0
$ – Conference champion

1950 South Carolina Little Four football standings
	Conf.					Overall
Team	W		L		T	W		L		T
Wofford $	3	–	0	–	0	7	–	2	–	1
Presbyterian	2	–	1	–	0	5	–	5	–	0
$ – Conference champion

1950 South Dakota Intercollegiate Conference football standings
	Conf.					Overall
Team	W		L		T	W		L		T
Northern State $	4	–	0	–	0	5	–	3	–	0
Huron	6	–	1	–	0	6	–	3	–	0
Black Hills	4	–	1	–	0	5	–	2	–	1
Southern State (SD)	5	–	2	–	0	6	–	2	–	0
General Beadle	3	–	2	–	0	4	–	2	–	0
South Dakota Mines	2	–	4	–	0	3	–	5	–	0
Dakota Wesleyan	1	–	5	–	1	1	–	6	–	1
Yankton	0	–	5	–	2	1	–	6	–	2
Sioux Falls	0	–	5	–	1	0	–	7	–	1
$ – Conference champion

1950 Southern California Intercollegiate Athletic Conference football standings
	Conf.					Overall
Team	W		L		T	W		L		T
Whittier +	3	–	1	–	0	9	–	1	–	0
Redlands +	3	–	1	–	0	5	–	3	–	0
Pomona +	3	–	1	–	0	4	–	3	–	1
Occidental	1	–	3	–	0	4	–	4	–	0
Caltech	0	–	4	–	0	1	–	6	–	0
+ – Conference co-champions

1950 Southwestern Athletic Conference football standings
	Conf.					Overall
Team	W		L		T	W		L		T
No. 2 Southern $	7	–	0	–	0	10	–	0	–	1
No. 5 Langston	6	–	1	–	0	9	–	1	–	0
No. 22 Bishop	5	–	2	–	0	7	–	3	–	1
No. 18 Prairie View A&M	4	–	3	–	0	6	–	4	–	1
Arkansas AM&N	2	–	5	–	0	4	–	6	–	1
Wiley	2	–	5	–	0	3	–	6	–	1
Texas College	1	–	5	–	1	1	–	9	–	1
Samuel Huston	0	–	6	–	1	0	–	6	–	2
$ – Conference champion; Rankings from the Pittsburgh Courier

1950 Texas Conference football standings
	Conf.					Overall
Team	W		L		T	W		L		T
Abilene Christian $	5	–	0	–	0	11	–	0	–	0
Texas A&I	4	–	1	–	0	6	–	3	–	0
Southwestern (TX)	2	–	3	–	0	5	–	5	–	0
Howard Payne	2	–	3	–	0	4	–	5	–	1
McMurry	2	–	3	–	0	4	–	5	–	0
Austin	0	–	5	–	0	2	–	7	–	0
$ – Conference champion

1950 Virginia Little Six Conference football standings
	Conf.					Overall
Team	W		L		T	W		L		T
Emory and Henry $	2	–	0	–	0	10	–	2	–	0
Randolph–Macon	2	–	1	–	0	5	–	4	–	0
Bridgewater	0	–	1	–	0	0	–	6	–	0
Hampden–Sydney	0	–	2	–	0	4	–	5	–	0
$ – Conference champion

1950 Volunteer State Athletic Conference football standings
	Conf.					Overall
Team	W		L		T	W		L		T
Middle Tennessee $	4	–	0	–	0	9	–	2	–	0
Milligan	1	–	1	–	1	3	–	4	–	2
Austin Peay	1	–	2	–	0	5	–	2	–	1
East Tennessee State	0	–	1	–	1	3	–	5	–	1
Union (TN)	0	–	2	–	0	2	–	8	–	0
$ – Conference champion

1950 West Virginia Intercollegiate Athletic Conference football standings
	Conf.					Overall
Team	W		L		T	W		L		T
Morris Harvey +	5	–	0	–	0	10	–	0	–	0
West Liberty State +	5	–	0	–	0	9	–	0	–	0
Potomac State +	4	–	0	–	0	6	–	0	–	0
Shepherd	3	–	2	–	1	4	–	4	–	1
West Virginia Tech	3	–	2	–	1	0	–	6	–	3
Fairmont State	4	–	3	–	0	4	–	4	–	0
Davis & Elkins	4	–	4	–	0	5	–	5	–	0
Salem	3	–	4	–	0	3	–	5	–	0
Glenville State	3	–	5	–	0	3	–	5	–	0
West Virginia Wesleyan	1	–	7	–	0	1	–	8	–	0
Concord	0	–	6	–	0	1	–	8	–	0
Bethany (WV) *	0	–	2	–	0	1	–	6	–	1
+ – Conference co-champions; * – Did not qualify for conference standings Ties did not count in conference standings.

1950 Wisconsin State Teachers College Conference football standings
	Conf.					Overall
Team	W		L		T	W		L		T
La Crosse State +	6	–	0	–	0	10	–	0	–	0
Whitewater State +	6	–	0	–	0	6	–	0	–	0
Platteville State	5	–	2	–	0	5	–	2	–	0
Stout Institute	3	–	2	–	1	5	–	2	–	1
River Falls State	2	–	3	–	1	3	–	3	–	2
Milwaukee State	2	–	3	–	1	3	–	4	–	1
Stevens Point State	2	–	4	–	0	3	–	4	–	1
Superior State	1	–	3	–	2	3	–	4	–	2
Eau Claire State	1	–	4	–	1	3	–	4	–	1
Oshkosh State	0	–	6	–	0	0	–	6	–	0
+ – Conference co-champions

1950 Yankee Conference football standings
	Conf.					Overall
Team	W		L		T	W		L		T
New Hampshire $	4	–	0	–	0	8	–	0	–	0
Maine	3	–	1	–	0	5	–	1	–	1
Rhode Island State	2	–	2	–	0	3	–	5	–	0
UMass	1	–	1	–	0	3	–	5	–	0
Vermont	0	–	3	–	0	2	–	5	–	0
Connecticut	0	–	3	–	0	3	–	5	–	0
$ – Conference champion

== Rankings ==
The final AP poll was released in late November and the final UP poll one week later.

AP Poll
Rank	Team	1st	Points
1	Oklahoma (10–1)	213	2,963
2	Army (8–1)	38	2,380
3	Texas (9–2)	4	1,988
4	Tennessee (11–1)	15	1,806
5	California (9–1–1)	8	1,787
6	Princeton (9–0)	6	1,420
7	Kentucky (11–1)	7	1,167
8	Michigan State (8–1)	3	864
9	Michigan (6–3–1)	-	493
10	Clemson (9–0–1)	9	374
11	Washington (8–2)	4	343
12	Wyoming (10–0)	4	297
13	Illinois (7–2)	-	275
14	Ohio State (6–3)	-	243
15	Miami (FL) (9–1–1)	1	225
16	Alabama (9–2)	1	221
17	Nebraska (6–2–1)	2	96
18	Washington & Lee (8–3)	2	54
19	Tulsa (9–1–1)	-	54
20	Tulane (6–2–1)	-	48

UP poll
Rank	Team	1st	Points
1	Oklahoma	32	346
2	Texas	-	250
3	Tennessee	-	236
4	California	-	233
5	Army	-	165
6	Michigan	-	162
7	Kentucky	-	154
8	Princeton	1	117
9	Michigan State	1	77
10	Ohio State	-	70
11	Illinois		55
12	Clemson		51
13	Miami (FL)		28
14	Wyoming	1	16
14	Baylor (7–3)		16
14	Washington		16
17	Alabama		8
18	Washington & Lee		7
19	Navy (3–6)		3
19	Cornell (7–2)		3
19	Nebraska		3
19	Wisconsin (6–3)		3
23	Maryland (7–2–1)		1
23	Georgia Tech (5–6)		1
23	Penn (6–3)		1

== Bowl games ==
=== Major bowls ===
Bowl game	Winning team		Losing team	
Sugar Bowl	No. 7 Kentucky	13	No. 1 Oklahoma	7
Cotton Bowl	No. 4 Tennessee	20	No. 3 Texas	14
Rose Bowl	No. 9 Michigan	14	No. 5 California	6
Orange Bowl	No. 10 Clemson	15	No. 15 Miami (FL)	14

=== Other bowls ===
Bowl game	Winning team		Losing team	
Gator Bowl	No. 12 Wyoming	20	No. 18 Washington & Lee	7
Sun Bowl	West Texas State	14	Cincinnati	13
Salad Bowl	Miami (OH)	34	Arizona State	21
Pineapple Bowl	Hawaii	28	Denver	27
Presidential Cup	Texas A&M	40	Georgia	20

== Heisman Trophy voting ==
The Heisman Trophy is given to the year's most outstanding player

Player	School	Position	Total
Vic Janowicz	Ohio State	HB	633
Kyle Rote	SMU	HB	280
Reds Bagnell	Penn	HB	231
Babe Parilli	Kentucky	QB	214
Bobby Reynolds	Nebraska	HB	174
Bob Williams	Notre Dame	QB	159
Leon Heath	Oklahoma	FB	125
Dan Foldberg	Army	E	103

== Statistical leaders ==
=== Individual ===
==== Total offense ====
The following players were the individual leaders in total offense during the 1950 season:

Major college

Rank	Player	Team	Games	Attempts	Total Yds	TdR
1	Johnny Bright	Drake	9	320	2,400	30
2	Billy Cox	Duke	10	397	1,995	11
3	Don Heinrich	Washington	10	271	1,807	17
4	Gil Bartosh	TCU	9	321	1,733	9
5	John Ford	Hardin-Simmons	10	245	1,720	15
6	Babe Parilli	Kentucky	11	234	1,681	28
7	Bill Weeks	Iowa State	10	278	1,673	15
8	Reds Bagnell	Penn	9	282	1,603	16
9	Bill Wade	Vanderbilt	11	224	1,595	18
10	Wilford White	Arizona State	10	207	1,589	25
11	Charles Maloy	Holy Cross	10	297	1,560	20
12	Don Klosterman	Loyola (CA)	9	239	1,542	20
13	Jimmy Coley	VMI	11	241	1,480	13
14	Bobby Reynolds	Nebraska	9	203	1,417	22
15	Dick Kazmaier	Princeton	9	191	1,372	22
16	Ed "Scooter" Mooney	NC State	10	364	1,354	6
17	Andy Davis	George Washington	9	253	1,345	5
18	Claude Arnold	Oklahoma	10	207	1,339	15
19	Tom Kingsford	Montana	10	254	1,318	16
20	Bob Smith	Texas A&M	10	200	1,302	14

Small college

Rank	Player	Team	Games	Attempts	Total Yds
1	Bob Heimerdinger	Northern Illinois State	9	286	1782
2	Ted Marchibroda	St. Bonaventure	9	262	1693
3	Eddie Haddox	Baldwin-Wallace	8	285	1650
4	Gil Georgeff	Central (MO)	9	206	1644
5	James Macholtz	Anderson (IN)	9	294	1605
6	Gene Mayfield	West Texas State	10	213	1566
7	Andy MacDonald	Central Michigan	10	262	1466
8	Eddie LeBaron	Quantico	11	193	1387
9	Joe Arenas	Omaha	9	209	1274
10	Meriel Michelson	Eastern Washington	10	180	1234
11	Joe Rabb	Louisiana Tech	10	291	1228
12	Johnson	Stetson	10	178	1220
13	Tom Greenan	St. Ambrose	13	159	1207
14	Dick Doyne	Lehigh	9	164	1206
15	Eddie Hyduke	Pepperdine	9	211	1204
16	Charlie Wright	West Texas State	10	206	1203
17	Billy Cross	West Texas State	10	130	1197
18	Carl Taseff	John Carroll	10	212	1186
19	Meriel Michelson	Eastern Washington	9	170	1171
20	Brad Rowland	McMurry	9	223	1170

==== Passing ====
The following players were the individual leaders in pass completions during the 1950 season:

Major college

Rank	Player	Team	Games	Compl.	Att.	Pct. Compl.	Yds.	Int.	TDs
1	Don Heinrich	Washington	10	134	221	60.9%	1,846	9	14
2	Dave Cunningham	Utah	9	119	217	54.8%	1,146	12	13
3	Bill Weeks	Iowa State	10	116	220	52.7%	1,552	16	9
4	Babe Parilli	Kentucky	11	114	204	56.2%	1,627	12	23
5	Don Klosterman	Loyola (CA)	9	113	207	54.6%	1,582	11	19
6	John Ford	Hardin-Simmons	10	111	199	55.8%	1,777	7	12
7	Fred Benners	SMU	10	109	192	56.8%	1,361	13	9
8	Billy Cox	Duke	10	108	206	52.4%	1,428	15	8
9	Charles Maloy	Holy Cross	10	104	242	43.0%	1,572	19	14
10	Bob Williams	Notre Dame	9	99	210	47.1%	1,035	15	10
11	Dick Flowers	Northwestern	9	91	183	49.7%	1,063	11	10
11	Larry Isbell	Baylor	10	91	187	48.7%	1,220	9	15
13	Haywood Sullivan	Florida	10	89	170	52.4%	1,134	8	9
14	Coley	VMI	11	89	195	45.6%	1,344	14	9
15	Tom Kingsford	Montana	10	84	184	45.7%	1,362	13	10
16	Johnny Bright	Drake	9	81	137	59.1%	1,168	9	12
17	Gary Kerkorian	Stanford	10	80	151	53.0%	1,148	9	6
18	Dick Doheny	Fordham	9	79	143	55.2%	1,252	5	12
19	Gil Bartosh	TCU	10	77	149	51.7%	1,023	9	7
20	Dale Samuels	Purdue	9	77	172	44.8	1,126	21	10

Small college

Rank	Player	Team	Games	Compl.	Att.	Pct. Compl.	Yds.	Int.	TDs
1	Andy MacDonald	Central Michigan	10	109	200	.545	1577	12	15
2	Bob Heimerdinger	Northern Illinois	9	102	210	.486	1597	18	13
3	Ted Marchibroda	St. Bonaventure	9	95	202	.470	1577	15	13
4	Sy Kalman	CCNY	8	94	211	.445	1034	15	5
5	Bob Aubry	Toledo	9	91	237	.384	1125	18	11
6	Eugene Traylor	Kentucky State	10	87	181	.481	1085	18	5
7	Eddie Hyduke	Pepperdine	9	86	188	.457	1260	8	11
8	Chuck Paige	Michigan State Normal	9	79	185	.427	1031	10	9
9	Gene Mayfield	West Texas State	10	78	153	.510	1359	9	11
10	Joe Zaleski	Dayton	9	77	165	.467	967	10	2
11	Al Morhard	Western Reserve	10	75	215	.349	1100	26	8

==== Rushing ====
The following players were the individual leaders in rushing yards during the 1950 season:

Major college

Rank	Player	Team	Games	Yds	Rushes	Avg
1	Wilford White	Arizona State	10	1,501	199	7.55
2	Bobby Reynolds	Nebraska	9	1,342	193	6.95
3	Bob Smith	Texas A&M	10	1,302	199	6.54
4	Johnny Bright	Drake	9	1,232	183	6.73
5	Wade Stinson	Kansas	10	1,129	167	6.76
6	Hugh McElhenny	Washington	10	1,107	179	6.18
7	Sonny Grandelius	Michigan State	9	1,023	163	6.28
8	Kayo Dottley	Ole Miss	10	1,007	191	5.27
9	Steve Wadiak	South Carolina	10	998	162	6.16
10	Jake Roberts	Tulsa	11	954	138	6.91
11	Johnny Olszewski	California	10	950	151	6.29
12	John Papit	Virginia	10	949	167	5.68
13	Charlie Hoag	Kansas	10	940	155	6.06
14	Bobby Marlow	Alabama	11	883	118	7.47
15	George Bean	Utah	9	878	163	5.39
16	Billy Vessels	Oklahoma	10	870	135	6.44
17	George Musacco	Loyola (CA)	9	866	187	4.63
18	Max Clark	Houston	10	860	129	6.67
19	Byron Townsend	Texas	10	841	228	3.69
20	Pete D'Alonzo	Villanova	9	833	145	5.74

Small college

Rank	Player	Team	Games	Yds	Rushes	Avg
1	Meriel Michelson	Eastern Washington	10	1234	180	6.86
2	Charlie Wright	West Texas State	10	1203	206	5.84
3	Billy Cross	West Texas State	10	1197	130	9.21
4	Carl Taseff	John Carroll	10	1164	210	5.54
5	John Yannes	St. Lawrence	8	1122	189	5.94
6	Gil Georgeff	Central (MO)	9	1057	127	8.32
7	Paul Yackey	Heidelberg	9	1018	163	6.25
7	Brad Rowland	McMurry	9	1018	182	5.59
9	Dick Doyne	Lehigh	9	994	156	6.37
10	Bobby Gardner	Ohio Wesleyan	9	961	181	5.31

==== Receiving ====
The following players were the individual leaders in receptions during the 1950 season:

Major college

Rank	Player	Team	Receptions	Receiving yards	TDs
1	Gordon Cooper	Denver	46	569	8
2	Tom Bienemann	Drake	45	615	2
3	Jim Doran	Iowa State	42	652	6
4	Don Stonesifer	Northwestern	42	560	5
5	Ceep Youmans	Duke	40	446	1
6	Bill McColl	Stanford	39	671	4
7	Sy Wilhelmi	Iowa State	38	442	2
8	Herman Fisher	Nevada	38	434	1
9	Fred Snyder	Loyola-Los Angeles	36	596	9
10	John Thomas	Oregon State	36	350	1
11	Al Lary	Alabama	35	756	10
11	Paul Bishoff	West Virginia	35	581	3
13	Alan Pfefer	Fordham	35	571	5
13	Harold Riley	Baylor	35	539	3
13	Al Bruno	Kentucky	35	532	10
13	Herbert McLean	Columbia	35	492	1
13	Jim Mutscheller	Notre Dame	35	426	7
18	Tom McCann	Holy Cross	34	438	2
18	Fred Smith	Tulsa	34	433	4
20	Gene Schroeder	Virginia	33	552	7

Small college

Rank	Player	Team	Games	Receptions	Receiving yards	TDs
1	Jack Bighead	Pepperdine	9	38	551	6
2	Bob McElroy	Quantico	11	37	686	9
3	Wendell "Joe" Swann	North Texas State	10	36	585	3
4	Norb Hecker	Baldwin-Wallace	8	34	614	7
5	Chuck Toy	Fresno State	9	34	587	9
6	Dan O'Connor	Niagara	8	34	462	6
7	John Schuesler	Butler	9	32	494	1
8	Harvey Singleton	Kentucky State	10	32	402	2
9	John "Moose" McGrath	Amherst	8	30	536	7
10	Giovanni "John" Partenio	Central Michigan	10	30	430	5

==== Scoring ====
The following players were the individual leaders in scoring during the 1950 season:

Major college

Rank	Player	Team	Pts	TD	PAT	FG
1	Bobby Reynolds	Nebraska	157	22	25	0
2	Wilford White	Arizona State	136	22	1	1
3	Eddie Talboom	Wyoming	130	15	40	0
4	Johnny Bright	Drake	108	18	0	0
5	Johnny Turco	Holy Cross	102	16	0	0
6	Bob Shemonski	Maryland	97	16	1	0
7	Max Clark	Houston	90	11	24	0
7	Merwin Hodel	Colorado	90	15	0	0
7	Billy Vessels	Oklahoma	90	15	0	0
10	Fred Cone	Clemson	86	14	2	0
11	Byron Townsend	Texas	84	14	0	0
11	Bob Smith	Texas A&M	84	14	0	0
11	Wade Stinson	Kansas	84	14	0	0
14	Al Pollard	Army	83	8	35	0
14	Walt Michaels	Washington & Lee	83	9	29	0
16	Dickie Lewis	William & Mary	82	10	22	0
17	Ollie Matson	San Francisco	81	13	3	0
18	Kyle Rote	SMU	78	13	0	0
18	Hugh McElhenny	Washington	78	13	0	0

Small college

Rank	Player	Team	Pts	TD	PAT	FG
1	Carl Taseff	John Carroll	138	23	0	0
2	Charlie Wright	West Texas State	120	20	0	0
3	Bob Miller	Emory & Henry	114	19	0	0
4	Ace Loomis	La Crosse State	108	18	0	0
5	Clarke	St. Augustine's	101	16	5	0
6	Tom Cook	William Jewell	97	16	1	0
7	Mark Thomsen	Dana	92	13	14	0
8	Gene Payne	Gustavus Adolphus	91	15	1	0
9	Bobby Gardner	Ohio Wesleyan	90	15	0	0
9	Odie Posey	Southern	90	12	12	2

=== Team ===
==== Total offense ====
The following teams were the leaders in total offense during the 1950 season:

Major college

Rank	Team	Games played	Total plays	Yards gained	Yards per game
1	Arizona State	10	92	4704	470.4
2	Princeton	9	617	3903	433.7
3	Tulsa	11	783	4747	431.5
4	Clemson	9	630	3881	431.2
5	Loyola (CA)	9	775	3781	420.1
6	Alabama	11	773	4576	416.0
7	Oklahoma	10	706	4154	415.4
8	Washington	10	694	4116	411.6
9	Nebraska	9	618	3666	407.3
10	Pacific	11	800	4399	399.9

Small college

Rank	Team	Games played	Total plays	Yards gained	Yards per game
1	West Texas State	10	680	4653	463.5
2	Miami (OH)	9	559	3747	416.3
3	John Carroll	10	701	4144	414.4
4	William Jewell	9	526	3675	408.3
5	St. Bonaventure	9	608	3625	402.8
6	St. Lawrence	8	572	3206	400.8
7	Western Illinois	8	585	3170	396.3
8	Lewis & Clark	9	575	3557	395.2
9	Morris Harvey	9	525	3521	391.2
10	North Texas State	10	660	3894	389.4

==== Rushing offense ====
The following teams were the leaders in rushing offense during the 1950 season:

Major college

Rank	Team	Games played	Total plays	Yards gained	Yards per game
1	Arizona State	10	620	3470	347.0
2	Princeton	9	503	2929	325.4
3	Nebraska	9	510	2894	321.6
4	Kansas	10	524	3116	311.6
5	Tulsa	11	3384	307.6	
6	Washington & Lee	10	578	2995	299.5
7	Pacific	11	619	3278	298.0
8	Clemson	9	504	2648	294.2
9	Oklahoma	10	562	2931	293.1
10	Army	9	477	2568	285.3

Small college

Rank	Team	Yards per game
1	St. Lawrence	356.1
2	Lewis & Clark	343.8
3	West Texas State	322.9
4	New Hampshire	303.0
5	William Jewell	302.3
6	Morris Harvey	298.9
7	Heidelberg	287.9
8	New Mexico Western	287.1
9	John Carroll	284.0
10	Western Illinois	282.1

==== Passing offense ====
The following teams were the leaders in passing offense during the 1950 season:

Major college

Rank	Team	Games played	Completions	Attempts	Pct	Yards	Yards per game	Int	TD
1	SMU	10	156	296	.527	2146	'214.6	24	14
2	Hardin-Simmons	10	130	228	.570	2061	206.1	8	15
3	Washington	10	149	260	.573	2041	204.1	12	14
4	Loyola (CA)	9	122	228	.535	1674	186.0	12	20
5	George Washington	9	113	228	.496	1475	163.9	17	7
6	Duke	10	121	236	.513	1639	163.9	21	10
7	Holy Cross	10	105	247	.425	1585	158.5	20	14
8	Drake	9	101	182	.555	1420	157.8	11	12
9	Iowa State	10	117	226	.518	1574	157.4	18	9
10	Kentucky	11	125	230	.543	1714	155.8	14	27

Small college

Rank	Team	Yards per game
1	Northern Illinois	187.0
2	Central Michigan	176.5
3	Miami (OH)	175.7
4	St. Bonaventure	174.8
5	Scranton	163.9
6	Pepperdine	158.6
7	Baldwin-Wallace	149.9
8	Buffalo	148.4
9	Central (MO)	146.6
10	Butler	144.6

==== Total defense ====
The following teams were the leaders in total defense during the 1950 season:

Major college

Rank	Team	Games played	Total plays	Yards gained	Yards per game
1	Wake Forest	9	491	1469	163.2
2	Kentucky	11	671	1895	172.3
3	Wyoming	9	493	1559	173.2
4	Army	9	637	1705	189.4
5	Miami (FL)	10	653	1968	196.8
6	Cornell	9	547	1788	198.7
7	Tennessee	11	673	2208	200.7
8	Tulane	9	557	1807	200.8
9	Mississippi State	9	470	1828	203.1
10	San Francisco	11	693	2240	203.6

Small college

Rank	Team	Games played	Total plays	Yards gained	Yards per game
1	New Haven State	7	315	655	93.6
2	Lewis & Clark	9	426	933	103.7
3	Southern	11	580	1433	130.3
4	St. Lawrence	8	367	1059	132.4
5	Abilene Christian	10	533	1386	138.6
6	Gustavus Adolphus	10	453	1402	140.2
7	Springfield	8	435	1244	155.5
8	North Carolina A&T	10	568	1560	156.0
9	Rider	8	406	1253	156.6
10	Valparaiso	9	516	1417	157.5

==== Rushing defense ====
The following teams were the leaders in rushing defense during the 1950 season:

Major college

Rank	Team	Games	No.	Yards	Avg..
1	Ohio State	9	341	576	64.0
2	Princeton	9	326	611	67.9
3	Wake Forest	9	330	626	69.6
4	San Francisco	11	435	820	74.5
5	Wyoming	9	343	788	87.6
6	Tulane	9	373	824	91.6
7	Kentucky	11	482	1021	92.8
8	Michigan State	9	344	874	97.1
9	Maryland	10	421	1016	101.6
10	Loyola (CA)	9	348	960	106.7

Small college

Rank	Team	Yards per game
1	Lewis & Clark	50.3
2	New Haven State	53.6
3	St. Lawrence	72.5
4	Scranton	76.4
5	Southern	78.9
6	North Carolina AT&T	79.5
7	Abilene Christian	81.3
8	Gustavus Adolphus	81.5
9	William Jewell	83.3
10	Franklin & Marshall	83.6

==== Passing defense ====
The following teams were the leaders in passing defense during the 1950 season:

Major college

Rank	Team	Games	Compl.	Att.	Pct	Yards	Yards per game	Int	TD
1	Tennessee	11	65	149	.436	743	67.5	23	2
2	Indiana	9	51	127	.402	629	69.9	12	3
3	Tulsa	11	59	181	.326	770	70.0	12	3
4	Duke	10	67	147	.456	707	70.7	17	3
5	Montana	9	48	127	.378	661	73.4	19	4
6	Iowa State	10	42	113	.372	741	74.1	9	4
7	Penn State	9	52	141	.369	671	74.6	18	8
8	Harvard	8	35	101	.347	599	74.9	2	6
9	Army	9	59	155	.381	679	75.4	18	1
10	Mississippi State	9	49	102	.480	703	78.1	7	7

Small college

Rank	Team	Yards per game
1	Vermont	34.4
2	New Haven State	40.0
3	Southern	51.4
4	Lewis & Clark	53.3
5	Rider	54.3
6	Washington (MD)	56.0
7	Cortland State	56.1
8	Oberlin	56.5
9	Wilmington	56.9
10	Abilene Christian	57.2

== See also ==
- 1950 College Football All-America Team
