= 1950 Navy Midshipmen football team =

American college football season

1950 Navy Midshipmen football
- Conference: Independent

Ranking
- Coaches: No. 19
- Record: 3–6
- Head coach: Eddie Erdelatz (1st season)
- Captain: Tom Bakke
- Home stadium: Municipal Stadium

1950 Southern college football independents records
| | Conf. | | | Overall |
| Team | W | L | T | W | | L | | T |
|---|---|---|---|---|---|---|---|---|
| Maryland State | | – | | 8 | – | 0 | – | 0 |
| No. 15 Miami (FL) | | – | | 9 | – | 1 | – | 1 |
| Memphis State | | – | | 9 | – | 2 | – | 0 |
| Virginia | | – | | 8 | – | 2 | – | 0 |
| Tampa | | – | | 5 | – | 4 | – | 0 |
| Grambling | | – | | 5 | – | 4 | – | 1 |
| Texas State | | – | | 5 | – | 5 | – | 1 |
| Houston | | – | | 4 | – | 6 | – | 0 |
| Louisville | | – | | 3 | – | 6 | – | 1 |
| Navy | | – | | 3 | – | 6 | – | 0 |
| Sewanee | | – | | 3 | – | 6 | – | 0 |
| Delaware | | – | | 2 | – | 5 | – | 1 |
| Georgetown | | – | | 2 | – | 7 | – | 0 |
| Chattanooga | | – | | 1 | – | 9 | – | 0 |
Rankings from AP Poll

The 1950 Navy Midshipmen football team represented the United States Naval Academy during the 1950 college football season. In their first season under head coach Eddie Erdelatz, the Midshipmen compiled a 3–6 record and were outscored by their opponents by a combined score of 176 to 122.

== Schedule ==
| Date | Opponent | Site | Result | Attendance | Source |
|---|---|---|---|---|---|
| September 30 | at Maryland | Byrd Stadium; College Park, MD (rivalry) | L 21–35 | 43,836 | |
| October 7 | Northwestern^{†} | Municipal Stadium; Baltimore, MD | L 0–22 | 12,000 | |
| October 14 | at Princeton | Palmer Stadium; Princeton, NJ | L 14–20 | 35,000 | |
| October 21 | USC | Municipal Stadium; Baltimore, MD | W 27–14 | 24,300 | |
| October 28 | at Penn | Franklin Field; Philadelphia, PA | L 7–30 | 60,000 | |
| November 4 | vs. Notre Dame | Municipal Stadium; Cleveland, OH (rivalry) | L 10–19 | 71,074 | |
| November 11 | Tulane* | Municipal Stadium; Baltimore, MD | L 0–27 | 20,000 | |
| November 18 | at Columbia | Baker Field; New York, NY | W 29–7 | 30,000 | |
| December 2 | vs. No. 2 Army | Philadelphia Municipal Stadium; Philadelphia, PA (Army–Navy Game) | W 14–2 | 103,000 | |
*Non-conference game; ^{†}Homecoming; Rankings from AP Poll released prior to the game
