= Alfred Priestley =

American sports coach, athletics administrator, educator (1899–1974)

Biographical details
- Born: September 29, 1900; New Orleans, Louisiana, U.S.
- Died: October 28, 1998 (aged 98); New Orleans, Louisiana, U.S.

Playing career

Football
- 1921–1924: Howard
- Position: Center

Coaching career (HC unless noted)

Football
- 1925–1931: Xavier (LA)
- 1925–1946: Xavier Prep (LA)
- 1947–1959: Xavier (LA)

Basketball
- 1947–1948: Xavier (LA)

Administrative career (AD unless noted)
- 1947–1959: Xavier (LA)

Head coaching record
- Overall: 10–6 (college basketball)

Alfred Cromwell "Zack" Priestley Jr. (September 29, 1900 – October 28, 1998) was an American football, basketball, and track coach, athletics administrator, and educator. He served two stints the head football coach at Xavier University of Louisiana in New Orleans, from 1925 to 1931 and 1947 to 1959. Priestley was also the head basketball coach at Xavier for one season, in 1947–48, compiling a record of 10–6.

Priestly graduated from Xavier University Preparatory School in New Orleans. He then went to Howard University in Washington, D.C., where he played center for the Howard Bison football team. Priestly returned to New Orleans in 1925 to coach at both Xavier University and Xavier Prep. When the college moved to a new location in 1932, Priestly remained with the high school. In 1947, he was promoted to head coach and athletic director of Xavier University. When intercollegiate athletics was discontinued at the university in 1959, Priestly became the college's director of intramural sports. From 1962 until his retirement in 1969, he taught at the university.

Priestley died on October 28, 1998, at his home in New Orleans.

== Head coaching record ==
=== College football ===
Year	Team	Overall	Conference	Standing	Bowl/playoffs
Xavier Gold Rush (Gulf Coast Athletic Association) (1925–1931)
1925	Xavier				
1926	Xavier				
1927	Xavier				
1928	Xavier				
1929	Xavier				
1930	Xavier				
1931	Xavier				
Xavier Gold Rush (Southern Intercollegiate Athletic Conference) (1947–1959)
1947	Xavier	1–5–1	0–2–1		
1948	Xavier	1–6–1	0–4–1	13th	
1949	Xavier	4–6	1–5		
1950	Xavier	7–1	6–0		
1951	Xavier	8–1	5–1	2nd	
1952	Xavier	4–5	3–2		
1953	Xavier	4–4–1	2–2–1	7th	
1954	Xavier	6–2	5–1	4th	
1955	Xavier	5–3	4–2	3rd	
1956	Xavier	6–3	4–2	T–4th	
1957	Xavier	2–5	2–2	NA	
1958	Xavier	3–3–1	3–2–1	6th	
1959	Xavier	3–5	2–4	T–11th	
Xavier:					
Total:					
