= 1950 Xavier Gold Rush football team =

American college football season

1950 Xavier Gold Rush football
- Conference: Southern Intercollegiate Athletic Conference
- Record: 7–1 (6–0 SIAC)
- Head coach: Alfred Priestley (11th season)
- Home stadium: Xavier Stadium

1950 Southern Intercollegiate Athletic Conference football standings
	Conf.					Overall
Team	W		L		T	W		L		T
Xavier (LA) +	6	–	0	–	0	7	–	1	–	0
Florida A&M +	5	–	0	–	0	8	–	1	–	1
Fisk	5	–	2	–	0	5	–	2	–	0
Morris Brown	5	–	2	–	0	7	–	3	–	0
Benedict	4	–	2	–	0	6	–	2	–	1
Fort Valley State	5	–	3	–	0	7	–	3	–	0
LeMoyne	3	–	2	–	1	3	–	3	–	1
Allen	2	–	2	–	1	5	–	4	–	1
Clark (GA)	3	–	4	–	1	3	–	4	–	1
Lane	2	–	3	–	1	2	–	6	–	2
Alabama State	3	–	5	–	1	3	–	6	–	1
Alabama A&M	2	–	5	–	0	3	–	7	–	0
Tuskegee	2	–	5	–	2	2	–	5	–	2
South Carolina State	1	–	6	–	0	1	–	7	–	0
Morehouse	0	–	6	–	1	1	–	6	–	1
Knoxville	0	–	1	–	0	0	–	7	–	0
+ – Conference co-champions

The 1950 Xavier Gold Rush football team was an American football team that represented Xavier University of Louisiana in the Southern Intercollegiate Athletic Conference during the 1950 college football season. Under 11th-year head coach Alfred Priestley, the Gold Rush compiled a 7–1 record (6–0 against conference opponents), shut out five of eight opponents, and outscored all opponents by a total of 242 to 54 and was ranked No. 13 among the nation's black college football teams according to the Pittsburgh Courier and its Dickinson Rating System. The team was undefeated in the regular season, and its sole loss was to No. 2 Southern in the Pelican State Classic. The team was led on offense by quarterback Eddie Flint, fullback Rip Robert, and Willie McKee.

== Schedule ==
Date	Opponent	Site	Result	Attendance	Source
September 30	Alabama State	Xavier Stadium; New Orleans, LA	W 55–0		
October 6	at Fisk	Galloway Stadium; Nashville, TN	W 7–0		
October 21	Lane	Xavier Stadium; New Orleans, LA	W 48–0		
October 28	Tuskegee	Xavier Stadium; New Orleans, LA	W 20–12		
November 4	at Clark	Herndon Stadium; Atlanta, GA	W 20–6		
November 11	Morehouse^{†}	Xavier Stadium; New Orleans, LA	W 26–0	3,000	
November 23	Dillard*	Xavier Stadium; New Orleans, LA	W 60–0		
December 2	vs. Southern*	Municipal Stadium; Baton Rouge, LA (Pelican State Classic)	L 6–36	12,000	
*Non-conference game; ^{†}Homecoming
