= 1950 Grambling Tigers football team =

American college football season

1950 Grambling Tigers football
- Conference: Independent
- Record: 5–4–1
- Head coach: Eddie Robinson (8th season)
- Home stadium: Tiger Stadium

1950 Southern college football independents records
	Conf.			Overall
Team	W	L	T	W		L		T
Maryland State		–		8	–	0	–	0
No. 15 Miami (FL)		–		9	–	1	–	1
Memphis State		–		9	–	2	–	0
Virginia		–		8	–	2	–	0
Tampa		–		5	–	4	–	0
Grambling		–		5	–	4	–	1
Texas State		–		5	–	5	–	1
Houston		–		4	–	6	–	0
Louisville		–		3	–	6	–	1
Navy		–		3	–	6	–	0
Sewanee		–		3	–	6	–	0
Delaware		–		2	–	5	–	1
Georgetown		–		2	–	7	–	0
Chattanooga		–		1	–	9	–	0
Rankings from AP Poll

The 1950 Grambling Tigers football team represented Grambling College (now known as Grambling State University) as an independent during the 1950 college football season. Led by eighth-year head coach Eddie Robinson, the Tigers compiled an overall record of 5–4–1.

== Schedule ==
Date	Time	Opponent	Site	Result	Attendance	Source
September 16		Texas College	Tiger Stadium; Grambling, LA	W 7–0		
September 30		at Maryland State	Princess Anne, MD	L 6–34		
October 7		Mississippi Industrial	Tiger Stadium; Grambling, LA	W 19–6		
October 14	8:00 p.m.	vs. Texas State*	Farrington Field; Fort Worth, TX	W 26–2		
October 23		vs. Wiley	State Fair Stadium; Shreveport, LA	T 14–14		
October 28		Tillotson	Tiger Stadium; Grambling, LA	W 27–7	4,000	
November 11		Prairie View A&M^{†}	Tiger Stadium; Grambling, LA	L 7–40	7,000	
November 18		at Paul Quinn	Katy Park; Waco, TX	W 13–6		
November 23	1:30 p.m.	at Tennessee A&I	A&I College Stadium; Nashville, TN	L 7–55	5,000	
December 2		vs. Bishop	Tech Stadium; Ruston, LA	L 0–38	500	
*Non-conference game; ^{†}Homecoming; All times are in Central time
