= 1950 Georgetown Hoyas football team =

American college football season

1950 Georgetown Hoyas football
- Conference: Independent
- Record: 2–7
- Head coach: Bob Margarita (2nd season)
- Captain: Tom Hardiman
- Home stadium: Griffith Stadium

1950 Southern college football independents records
	Conf.			Overall
Team	W	L	T	W		L		T
Maryland State		–		8	–	0	–	0
No. 15 Miami (FL)		–		9	–	1	–	1
Memphis State		–		9	–	2	–	0
Virginia		–		8	–	2	–	0
Tampa		–		5	–	4	–	0
Grambling		–		5	–	4	–	1
Texas State		–		5	–	5	–	1
Houston		–		4	–	6	–	0
Louisville		–		3	–	6	–	1
Navy		–		3	–	6	–	0
Sewanee		–		3	–	6	–	0
Delaware		–		2	–	5	–	1
Georgetown		–		2	–	7	–	0
Chattanooga		–		1	–	9	–	0
Rankings from AP Poll

The 1950 Georgetown Hoyas football team was an American football team that represented Georgetown University as an independent during the 1950 college football season. In their second season under head coach Bob Margarita, the Hoyas compiled a 2–7 record and were outscored by a total of 187 to 116. The team played its home games at Griffith Stadium in Washington, D.C.

== Schedule ==
Date	Opponent	Site	Result	Attendance	Source
September 30	at Penn State	New Beaver Field; State College, PA	L 14–34	16,000	
October 7	Tulsa	Griffith Stadium; Washington, DC	L 7–21	4,341	
October 14	No. 8 Maryland	Griffith Stadium; Washington, DC	L 14–25	8,869	
October 20	at Boston College	Braves Field; Boston, MA	W 20–10	14,548	
October 28	Villanova	Griffith Stadium; Washington, DC	L 14–20	5,192	
November 3	at No. 8 Miami (FL)	Burdine Stadium; Miami, FL	L 7–42	30,929	
November 11	at Fordham	Polo Grounds; New York, NY	L 13–14	13,130	
November 18	at Holy Cross	Fitton Field; Worcester, MA	W 21–14	12,000	
November 25	at George Washington	Griffith Stadium; Washington, DC	L 6–7	2,000	
Rankings from AP Poll released prior to the game
