= 1950 Delaware Fightin' Blue Hens football team =

American college football season

1950 Delaware Fightin' Blue Hens football
- Conference: Independent
- Record: 2–5–1
- Head coach: William D. Murray (8th season)
- Captains: Fred Schenck; James Thomas
- Home stadium: Wilmington Park

1950 Southern college football independents records
	Conf.			Overall
Team	W	L	T	W		L		T
Maryland State		–		8	–	0	–	0
No. 15 Miami (FL)		–		9	–	1	–	1
Memphis State		–		9	–	2	–	0
Virginia		–		8	–	2	–	0
Tampa		–		5	–	4	–	0
Grambling		–		5	–	4	–	1
Texas State		–		5	–	5	–	1
Houston		–		4	–	6	–	0
Louisville		–		3	–	6	–	1
Navy		–		3	–	6	–	0
Sewanee		–		3	–	6	–	0
Delaware		–		2	–	5	–	1
Georgetown		–		2	–	7	–	0
Chattanooga		–		1	–	9	–	0
Rankings from AP Poll

The 1950 Delaware Fightin' Blue Hens football team was an American football team that represented the University of Delaware as an independent during the 1950 college football season. The team compiled a 2–5–1 record and was outscored by a total of 147 to 55.

The team was led by William D. Murray in his eighth season as the program's head football coach. He also served as the school's athletic director. In January 1951, Murray was hired as the head football coach at Duke.

== Schedule ==
Date	Opponent	Site	Result	Attendance	Source
September 23	at Lehigh	Taylor Stadium; Bethlehem, PA (rivalry)	L 0–21	6,000	
September 30	West Chester	Wilmington Park; Wilmington, DE (rivalry)	W 16–13	8,200	
October 7	Pennsylvania Military	Wilmington Park; Wilmington, DE	W 32–20	6,300	
October 21	Lafayette	Wilmington Park; Wilmington, DE	L 7–9	6,400	
October 28	at Muhlenberg	Allentown High School Stadium; Allentown, PA	T 0–0	5,000	
November 4	at Temple	Temple Stadium; Philadelphia, PA	L 0–39	5,000	
November 11	Washington and Lee	Wilmington Park; Wilmington, DE	L 0–32	5,000	
November 18	Bucknell	Wilmington Park; Wilmington, DE	L 0–13	5,000	
