= 1950 Tampa Spartans football team =

American college football season

1950 Tampa Spartans football
- Conference: Independent
- Record: 5–4
- Head coach: Frank Sinkwich (1st season)
- Home stadium: Phillips Field

1950 Southern college football independents records
	Conf.			Overall
Team	W	L	T	W		L		T
Maryland State		–		8	–	0	–	0
No. 15 Miami (FL)		–		9	–	1	–	1
Memphis State		–		9	–	2	–	0
Virginia		–		8	–	2	–	0
Tampa		–		5	–	4	–	0
Grambling		–		5	–	4	–	1
Texas State		–		5	–	5	–	1
Houston		–		4	–	6	–	0
Louisville		–		3	–	6	–	1
Navy		–		3	–	6	–	0
Sewanee		–		3	–	6	–	0
Delaware		–		2	–	5	–	1
Georgetown		–		2	–	7	–	0
Chattanooga		–		1	–	9	–	0
Rankings from AP Poll

The 1950 Tampa Spartans football team represented the University of Tampa in the 1950 college football season. It was the Spartans' 14th season. The team was led by head coach Frank Sinkwich, in his first year, and played their home games at Phillips Field in Tampa, Florida. They finished with a record of five wins and four losses (5–4).

On March 1, 1950, Frank Sinkwich was hired by Tampa to serve as the Spartans' head coach after the resignation of Mike Gaddis. The season opened with a victory at Camp Lejeune and a loss against Jacksonville State before the Spartans won their first home game of the season against Wofford. Tampa then won their next game over Stetson before they lost their second game of the season to Appalachian State. After a pair of home victories over Livingston State and Delta State, Tampa closed the season with a pair of road losses. The first came against Marine Corps Base Quantico and the second against Florida State.

== Schedule ==
Date	Opponent	Site	Result	Attendance	Source
September 30	at Camp Lejeune	Jacksonville, NC	W 13–7	10,000	
October 7	at Jacksonville State	College Bowl; Jacksonville, AL	L 7–20		
October 14	Wofford	Phillips Field; Tampa, FL	W 13–0		
October 21	Stetson	Phillips Field; Tampa, FL	W 27–20		
October 28	Appalachian State	Phillips Field; Tampa, FL	L 19–36	8,000	
November 4	Livingston State	Phillips Field; Tampa, FL	W 41–39		
November 11	Delta State^{†}	Phillips Field; Tampa, FL	W 34–6	7,000	
November 18	at Quantico Marines	George Washington High School Stadium; Alexandria, VA	L 0–48	8,000	
November 25	at Florida State	Doak Campbell Stadium; Tallahassee, FL	L 19–35		
^{†}Homecoming
