= 1950 Miami Hurricanes football team =

American college football season

1950 Miami Hurricanes football

Orange Bowl, L 14–15 vs. Clemson
- Conference: Independent

Ranking
- Coaches: No. 13
- AP: No. 15
- Record: 9–1–1
- Head coach: Andy Gustafson (3rd season)
- Home stadium: Burdine Stadium

1950 Southern college football independents records
	Conf.			Overall
Team	W	L	T	W		L		T
Maryland State		–		8	–	0	–	0
No. 15 Miami (FL)		–		9	–	1	–	1
Memphis State		–		9	–	2	–	0
Virginia		–		8	–	2	–	0
Tampa		–		5	–	4	–	0
Grambling		–		5	–	4	–	1
Texas State		–		5	–	5	–	1
Houston		–		4	–	6	–	0
Louisville		–		3	–	6	–	1
Navy		–		3	–	6	–	0
Sewanee		–		3	–	6	–	0
Delaware		–		2	–	5	–	1
Georgetown		–		2	–	7	–	0
Chattanooga		–		1	–	9	–	0
Rankings from AP Poll

The 1950 Miami Hurricanes football team represented the University of Miami as an independent during the 1950 college football season. Led by third-year head coach Andy Gustafson, the Hurricanes played their home games at Burdine Stadium in Miami, Florida. The Hurricanes participated in the Orange Bowl, in a post-season matchup against Clemson, where they lost, 15–14. The team ranked fifth in major college football in total defense, allowing an average of only 196.8 yards per game.

== Schedule ==
Date	Opponent	Rank	Site	Result	Attendance	Source
September 29	The Citadel		Burdine Stadium; Miami, FL	W 21–0	33,332	
October 6	Villanova		Burdine Stadium; Miami, FL	W 18–12	35,294	
October 14	at No. 9 Purdue		Ross–Ade Stadium; West Lafayette, IN	W 20–14	32,000	
October 20	Boston University	No. 14	Burdine Stadium; Miami, FL	W 34–7	40,119	
October 28	at Pittsburgh	No. 11	Pitt Stadium; Pittsburgh, PA	W 28–0	24,537	
November 3	Georgetown	No. 8	Burdine Stadium; Miami, FL	W 42–7	30,929	
November 10	Louisville	No. 9	Burdine Stadium; Miami, FL (rivalry)	T 13–13	28,824	
November 18	at Florida	No. 17	Florida Field; Gainesville, FL (rivalry)	W 20–14	40,000	
November 24	Iowa	No. 14	Burdine Stadium; Miami, FL	W 14–6	44,999	
December 1	Missouri	No. 15	Burdine Stadium; Miami, FL	W 27–9	39,623	
January 1	No. 10 Clemson	No. 15	Burdine Stadium; Miami, FL (Orange Bowl)	L 14–15	65,181	
Rankings from AP Poll released prior to the game
