= 1950 Virginia Cavaliers football team =

American college football season

1950 Virginia Cavaliers football
- Conference: Independent
- Record: 8–2
- Head coach: Art Guepe (5th season)
- Captains: Robert Weir; John Papit
- Home stadium: Scott Stadium

1950 Southern college football independents records
	Conf.			Overall
Team	W	L	T	W		L		T
Maryland State		–		8	–	0	–	0
No. 15 Miami (FL)		–		9	–	1	–	1
Memphis State		–		9	–	2	–	0
Virginia		–		8	–	2	–	0
Tampa		–		5	–	4	–	0
Grambling		–		5	–	4	–	1
Texas State		–		5	–	5	–	1
Houston		–		4	–	6	–	0
Louisville		–		3	–	6	–	1
Navy		–		3	–	6	–	0
Sewanee		–		3	–	6	–	0
Delaware		–		2	–	5	–	1
Georgetown		–		2	–	7	–	0
Chattanooga		–		1	–	9	–	0
Rankings from AP Poll

The 1950 Virginia Cavaliers football team represented the University of Virginia during the 1950 college football season. The Cavaliers were led by fifth-year head coach Art Guepe and played their home games at Scott Stadium in Charlottesville, Virginia. They competed as independents, finishing with a record of 8–2.

== Schedule ==
Date	Opponent	Site	Result	Attendance	Source
September 23	George Washington	Scott Stadium; Charlottesville, VA	W 19–0	20,000	
September 30	at Penn	Franklin Field; Philadelphia, PA	L 7–21	40,000	
October 7	vs. VPI	Victory Stadium; Roanoke, VA (rivalry)	W 45–6	12,000	
October 14	vs. Washington and Lee	City Stadium; Richmond, VA (Tobacco Bowl)	W 26–21	21,500	
October 21	VMI^{†}	Scott Stadium; Charlottesville, VA	W 26–13	22,000	
October 28	at West Virginia	Mountaineer Field; Morgantown, WV	W 28–21	22,000	
November 4	at The Citadel	Johnson Hagood Stadium; Charleston, SC	W 34–14	5,500	
November 11	William & Mary	Scott Stadium; Charlottesville, VA	W 13–0	33,000	
November 18	at Tulane	Tulane Stadium; New Orleans, LA	L 18–42	30,000	
December 2	North Carolina	Scott Stadium; Charlottesville, VA (South's Oldest Rivalry)	W 44–13	29,000–30,000	
^{†}Homecoming
