= 1950 Houston Cougars football team =

American college football season

1950 Houston Cougars football
- Conference: Independent
- Record: 4–6
- Head coach: Clyde Lee (3rd season)
- Captains: Bill Moeller; Max Clark
- Home stadium: Public School Stadium; Houston Stadium

1950 Southern college football independents records
	Conf.			Overall
Team	W	L	T	W		L		T
Maryland State		–		8	–	0	–	0
No. 15 Miami (FL)		–		9	–	1	–	1
Memphis State		–		9	–	2	–	0
Virginia		–		8	–	2	–	0
Tampa		–		5	–	4	–	0
Grambling		–		5	–	4	–	1
Texas State		–		5	–	5	–	1
Houston		–		4	–	6	–	0
Louisville		–		3	–	6	–	1
Navy		–		3	–	6	–	0
Sewanee		–		3	–	6	–	0
Delaware		–		2	–	5	–	1
Georgetown		–		2	–	7	–	0
Chattanooga		–		1	–	9	–	0
Rankings from AP Poll

The 1950 Houston Cougars football team was an American football team that represented the University of Houston as an independent during the 1950 college football season. In its third season under head coach Clyde Lee, the team compiled a 4–6 record. Bill Moeller and Max Clark were the team captains. The team played its home games at Public School Stadium in Houston.

== Schedule ==
Date	Time	Opponent	Site	Result	Attendance	Source
September 23		St. Bonaventure	Public School Stadium; Houston, TX	L 14–29	14,000	
September 30		at Baylor	Baylor Stadium; Waco, TX (rivalry)	L 7–34	24,500–25,000	
October 7		at Trinity (TX)	Alamo Stadium; San Antonio, TX	L 16–20	1,456	
October 14		Louisville	Public School Stadium; Houston, TX	W 27–7	5,000–14,342	
October 20		at Hardin–Simmons	Parramore Stadium; Abilene, TX	L 13–14		
October 28		at Wichita	Veterans Field; Wichita, KS	W 46–6	10,000	
November 11		North Texas State	Public School Stadium; Houston, TX	L 13–16	8,000	
November 18		William & Mary^{†}	Houston Stadium; Houston, TX	W 36–18	25,342	
November 24	8:00 p.m.	Midwestern (TX)	Public School Stadium; Houston, TX	W 40–18	2,500	
December 2		Tulsa	Rice Stadium; Houston, TX	L 21–28	10,000	
^{†}Homecoming; All times are in Central time
