= 1950 Chattanooga Moccasins football team =

American college football season

1950 Chattanooga Moccasins football
- Conference: Independent
- Record: 1–9
- Head coach: Scrappy Moore (20th season)
- Captains: Jim Jumper; Zip Levi
- Home stadium: Chamberlain Field

1950 Southern college football independents records
	Conf.			Overall
Team	W	L	T	W		L		T
Maryland State		–		8	–	0	–	0
No. 15 Miami (FL)		–		9	–	1	–	1
Memphis State		–		9	–	2	–	0
Virginia		–		8	–	2	–	0
Tampa		–		5	–	4	–	0
Grambling		–		5	–	4	–	1
Texas State		–		5	–	5	–	1
Houston		–		4	–	6	–	0
Louisville		–		3	–	6	–	1
Navy		–		3	–	6	–	0
Sewanee		–		3	–	6	–	0
Delaware		–		2	–	5	–	1
Georgetown		–		2	–	7	–	0
Chattanooga		–		1	–	9	–	0
Rankings from AP Poll

The 1950 Chattanooga Moccasins football team was an American football team that represented the University of Chattanooga (now known as the University of Tennessee at Chattanooga) during the 1950 college football season. In its 20th year under head coach Scrappy Moore, the team compiled a 1–9 record.

== Schedule ==
Date	Opponent	Site	Result	Attendance	Source
September 23	at Alabama	Legion Field; Birmingham, AL	L 0–27	13,000	
September 29	Abilene Christian	Chamberlain Field; Chattanooga, TN	L 7–13	10,000	
October 6	Memphis State	Chamberlain Field; Chattanooga, TN	L 8–26	7,000	
October 14	at No. 14 Tennessee	Shields–Watkins Field; Knoxville, TN	L 0–41	15,000	
October 20	North Texas State	Chamberlain Field; Chattanooga, TN	L 14–19	5,000	
October 27	at Mississippi Southern	Ladd Stadium; Mobile, AL	L 13–14	5,000	
November 3	Vanderbilt	Chamberlain Field; Chattanooga, TN	L 12–34	10,000	
November 11	at Ole Miss	Hemingway Stadium; Oxford, MS	L 0–20		
November 17	Duquesne^{†}	Chamberlain Field; Chattanooga, TN	W 32–20	8,500	
November 23	Dayton	Chamberlain Field; Chattanooga, TN	L 4–7	8,500	
^{†}Homecoming; Rankings from AP Poll released prior to the game
