= 1950 Texas State Tigers football team =

American college football season

1950 Texas State Tigers football
- Conference: Independent
- Record: 5–5–1
- Head coach: Alexander Durley (2nd season)
- Home stadium: Buffalo Stadium

1950 Southern college football independents records
	Conf.			Overall
Team	W	L	T	W		L		T
Maryland State		–		8	–	0	–	0
No. 15 Miami (FL)		–		9	–	1	–	1
Memphis State		–		9	–	2	–	0
Virginia		–		8	–	2	–	0
Tampa		–		5	–	4	–	0
Grambling		–		5	–	4	–	1
Texas State		–		5	–	5	–	1
Houston		–		4	–	6	–	0
Louisville		–		3	–	6	–	1
Navy		–		3	–	6	–	0
Sewanee		–		3	–	6	–	0
Delaware		–		2	–	5	–	1
Georgetown		–		2	–	7	–	0
Chattanooga		–		1	–	9	–	0
Rankings from AP Poll

The 1950 Texas State Tigers football team was an American football team that represented Texas State University for Negroes (now known as Texas Southern University) as an independent during the 1950 college football season. Led by second-year head coach Alexander Durley, the Tigers compiled an overall record of 5–5–1.

== Schedule ==
Date	Opponent	Site	Result	Attendance	Source
September 16	at Wiley	Wildcat Stadium; Marshall, TX	W 6–0	900	
September 22	Southern	Buffalo Stadium; Houston, TX	L 0–19		
September 30	Tillotson	Buffalo Stadium; Houston, TX	W 19–7		
October 7	vs. Bishop	Port Arthur, TX	L 7–53	3,000	
October 14	vs. Grambling	Farrington Field; Fort Worth, TX	L 2–26		
October 21	Kentucky State	Buffalo Stadium; Houston, TX	W 7–0		
October 27	Prairie View A&M	Buffalo Stadium; Houston, TX (rivalry)	L 6–32	3,500	
November 11	Samuel Huston	Buffalo Stadium; Houston, TX	T 0–0		
November 17	Texas College^{†}	Buffalo Stadium; Houston, TX	W 14–6	3,000	
November 25	Langston	Buffalo Stadium; Houston, TX	L 7–39		
December 2	Arkansas AM&N	Buffalo Stadium; Houston, TX	W 13–0		
^{†}Homecoming
