= 1950 Wiley Wildcats football team =

American college football season

1950 Wiley Wildcats football
- Conference: Southwestern Athletic Conference
- Record: 3–6–1 (2–5 SWAC)
- Head coach: Eolus Von Rettig (2nd season)
- Home stadium: Wiley Field

1950 Southwestern Athletic Conference football standings
	Conf.					Overall
Team	W		L		T	W		L		T
No. 2 Southern $	7	–	0	–	0	10	–	0	–	1
No. 5 Langston	6	–	1	–	0	9	–	1	–	0
No. 22 Bishop	5	–	2	–	0	7	–	3	–	1
No. 18 Prairie View A&M	4	–	3	–	0	6	–	4	–	1
Arkansas AM&N	2	–	5	–	0	4	–	6	–	1
Wiley	2	–	5	–	0	3	–	6	–	1
Texas College	1	–	5	–	1	1	–	9	–	1
Samuel Huston	0	–	6	–	1	0	–	6	–	2
$ – Conference champion; Rankings from the Pittsburgh Courier

The 1950 Wiley Wildcats football team represented Wiley College as a member of the Southwestern Athletic Conference (SWAC) during the 1950 college football season. Led by second-year head coach Eolus Von Rettig, the Wildcats compiled an overall record of 3–6–1, with a conference record of 2–5, and finished ied for fifth in the SWAC.

== Schedule ==
Date	Opponent	Site	Result	Attendance	Source
September 16	Texas State*	Wildcat Stadium; Marshall, TX	L 0–6	900	
September 30	Arkansas AM&N	Wildcat Stadium; Marshall, TX	W 7–6		
October 7	at Dillard*	Dillard Stadium; New Orleans, LA	W 7–0		
October 16	vs. Prairie View A&M	Cotton Bowl; Dallas, TX	L 0–47		
October 23	vs. Grambling*	State Fair Stadium; Shreveport, LA	T 14–14		
November 4	at Langston	Anderson Field; Langston, OK	L 0–53		
November 11	Southern	Wildcat Stadium; Marshall, TX	L 6–19	2,000	
November 18	Samuel Huston^{†}	Wildcat Stadium; Marshall, TX	W 7–6	3,500	
November 23	at Bishop	Tiger Stadium; Marshall, TX	L 0–15		
November 30	at Texas College	Steer Stadium; Tyler, TX	L 6–15		
*Non-conference game; ^{†}Homecoming
