= 1950 Prairie View A&M Panthers football team =

American college football season

1950 Prairie View A&M Panthers football

Prairie View Bowl, T 6–6 vs. Bishop
- Conference: Southwestern Athletic Conference
- Record: 6–4–1 (4–3 SWAC)
- Head coach: James A. Stevens (2nd season)
- Home stadium: Blackshear Field

1950 Southwestern Athletic Conference football standings
	Conf.					Overall
Team	W		L		T	W		L		T
No. 2 Southern $	7	–	0	–	0	10	–	0	–	1
No. 5 Langston	6	–	1	–	0	9	–	1	–	0
No. 22 Bishop	5	–	2	–	0	7	–	3	–	1
No. 18 Prairie View A&M	4	–	3	–	0	6	–	4	–	1
Arkansas AM&N	2	–	5	–	0	4	–	6	–	1
Wiley	2	–	5	–	0	3	–	6	–	1
Texas College	1	–	5	–	1	1	–	9	–	1
Samuel Huston	0	–	6	–	1	0	–	6	–	2
$ – Conference champion; Rankings from the Pittsburgh Courier

The 1950 Prairie View A&M Panthers football team was an American football team that represented Prairie View A&M College of Texas (now known as Prairie View A&M University) as a member of the Southwestern Athletic Conference (SWAC) during the 1950 college football season. In their second season under head coach James A. Stevens, the Panthers compiled an overall record of 6–4–1, with a mark of 4–3 in conference play, and finished fourth in the SWAC.

== Schedule ==
Date	Opponent	Site	Result	Attendance	Source
September 23	Samuel Huston	Blackshear Field; Prairie View, TX	W 38–13		
September 30	Bishop	Blackshear Field; Prairie View, TX	L 0–13	3,500	
October 7	at Wilberforce State*	Wilberforce, OH	L 6–18	4,500	
October 16	vs. Wiley	Cotton Bowl; Dallas, TX	W 47–0		
October 21	Arkansas AM&N	Blackshear Field; Prairie View, TX	W 21–7	4,500	
October 27	at Texas State*	Buffalo Stadium; Houston, TX (rivalry)	W 32–6	3,500	
November 4	Texas College^{†}	Blackshear Field; Prairie View, TX	W 13–6	7,500	
November 11	at Grambling*	Tiger Stadium; Grambling, LA	W 40–7	7,000	
November 18	at Langston	Anderson Field; Langston, OK	L 13–21	4,000	
November 25	Southern	Blackshear Field; Prairie View, TX	L 0–3	6,000	
January 1	vs. Bishop*	Buffalo Stadium; Houston, TX (Prairie View Bowl)	T 6–6	2,300	
*Non-conference game; ^{†}Homecoming
