= 1950 Florida State Seminoles football team =

American college football season

1950 Florida State Seminoles football

Dixie Conference champion
- Conference: Dixie Conference
- Record: 8–0 (4–0 Dixie)
- Head coach: Don Veller (3rd season)
- Captain: Duke Maltby
- Home stadium: Doak Campbell Stadium

The 1950 Florida State Seminoles football team represented Florida State University as a member of the Dixie Conference during the 1950 college football season. Led by third-year head coach Don Veller, the Seminoles compiled an overall record of 8–0 with a mark of 4–0 in conference play, winning the Dixie Conference title for the third consecutive season. It was the first undefeated season for the program. The second game of the season, a victory over Randolph–Macon, was the first played at Doak Campbell Stadium.

== Schedule ==
Date	Opponent	Site	Result	Attendance	Source
September 30	at Troy State*	Veterans Memorial Stadium; Troy, AL	W 26–7		
October 7	Randolph–Macon*	Doak Campbell Stadium; Tallahassee, FL	W 40–7	9,600	
October 14	Howard (AL)	Doak Campbell Stadium; Tallahassee, FL	W 20–6	5,537	
October 21	at Newberry*	Setzler Field; Newberry, SC	W 24–0	1,000	
October 28	Sewanee*^{†}	Doak Campbell Stadium; Tallahassee, FL	W 14–8	12,033	
November 10	at Stetson	DeLand Municipal Stadium; DeLand, FL	W 27–7	6,000	
November 17	Mississippi College	Doak Campbell Stadium; Tallahassee, FL	W 33–0	5,000	
November 25	Tampa	Doak Campbell Stadium; Tallahassee, FL	W 35–19		
*Non-conference game; ^{†}Homecoming
