= 1950 Maryland State Hawks football team =

American college football season

1950 Maryland State Hawks football

Furniture Bowl, W 34–7 vs. Bluefield State
- Conference: Independent
- Record: 8–0
- Head coach: Vernon McCain (3rd season)

1950 Southern college football independents records
	Conf.			Overall
Team	W	L	T	W		L		T
Maryland State		–		8	–	0	–	0
No. 15 Miami (FL)		–		9	–	1	–	1
Memphis State		–		9	–	2	–	0
Virginia		–		8	–	2	–	0
Tampa		–		5	–	4	–	0
Grambling		–		5	–	4	–	1
Texas State		–		5	–	5	–	1
Houston		–		4	–	6	–	0
Louisville		–		3	–	6	–	1
Navy		–		3	–	6	–	0
Sewanee		–		3	–	6	–	0
Delaware		–		2	–	5	–	1
Georgetown		–		2	–	7	–	0
Chattanooga		–		1	–	9	–	0
Rankings from AP Poll

The 1950 Maryland State Hawks football team was an American football team that represented Maryland State College (now known as University of Maryland Eastern Shore) during the 1950 college football season. In their third season under head coach Vernon McCain, the team compiled an 8–0 record and outscored opponents by a total of 361 to 32. The 1950 team achieved the second consecutive undefeated season for the program. The 1949 and 1950 teams went 16–0 and outscored opponents by a combined total of 671 to 40.

The 1950 Maryland State team was ranked No. 3 among the nation's black college football teams according to the Pittsburgh Courier and its Dickinson Rating System. In the final Dickinson rankings, three undefeated black colleges received the following point totals: Florida A&M (28.76); Southern (28.50); and Maryland State (28.00). However, Florida A&M lost to Wilberforce State in the Orange Blossom Classic, after the final Dickinson rankings were released.

Maryland State was led on offense by halfback Sylvester Polk. Polk led the nation in 1949 with 129 points scored. During the 1950 season, Polk scored 13 touchdowns for 78 points and totaled 1,275 rushing yards on 79 carries, an average of 16.1 yards per carry.

== Schedule ==
Date	Opponent	Site	Result	Attendance	Source
September 30	Grambling	Princess Anne, MD	W 34–6		
October 14	vs. Hampton	William & Mary Stadium; Norfolk, VA (Fish Bowl)	W 48–12		
October 28	Cheyney	Princess Anne, MD	W 66–0		
November 4	Fayetteville State	Princess Anne, MD	W 67–0		
November 11	at Wilkes	Wilkes-Barre, PA	W 47–13		
November 18	Bethune–Cookman	Tampa, FL	W 65–7		
November 23	Delaware State	Princess Anne, MD	W 34–0		
December 3	vs. Bluefield State	Martinsville, VA (Furniture Bowl)	W 34–7		
