= 1950 Louisville Cardinals football team =

American college football season

1950 Louisville Cardinals football
- Conference: Independent
- Record: 3–6–1
- Head coach: Frank Camp (5th season)
- Home stadium: duPont Manual Stadium

1950 Southern college football independents records
	Conf.			Overall
Team	W	L	T	W		L		T
Maryland State		–		8	–	0	–	0
No. 15 Miami (FL)		–		9	–	1	–	1
Memphis State		–		9	–	2	–	0
Virginia		–		8	–	2	–	0
Tampa		–		5	–	4	–	0
Grambling		–		5	–	4	–	1
Texas State		–		5	–	5	–	1
Houston		–		4	–	6	–	0
Louisville		–		3	–	6	–	1
Navy		–		3	–	6	–	0
Sewanee		–		3	–	6	–	0
Delaware		–		2	–	5	–	1
Georgetown		–		2	–	7	–	0
Chattanooga		–		1	–	9	–	0
Rankings from AP Poll

The 1950 Louisville Cardinals football team was an American football team that represented the University of Louisville as an independent during the 1950 college football season. In their fifth season under head coach Frank Camp, the Cardinals compiled a 3–6–1 record.

== Schedule ==
Date	Time	Opponent	Site	Result	Attendance	Source
September 23	2:00 p.m.	Saint Francis (PA)	duPont Manual Stadium; Louisville, KY	W 34–14		
September 30		Buffalo	duPont Manual Stadium; Louisville, KY	W 48–19		
October 7		at Cincinnati	Nippert Stadium; Cincinnati, OH	L 20–28		
October 14		at Houston	Robertson Stadium; Houston, TX	L 7–27	5,000–14,342	
October 21		at Xavier	Corcoran Stadium; Cincinnati, OH	L 13–36	9,000	
October 28	8:00 p.m.	Duquesne^{†}	duPont Manual Stadium; Louisville, KY	L 20–27	12,000	
November 4	2:00 p.m.	at Washington University	Francis Field; St. Louis, MO	W 28–7	3,750	
November 10		at No. 10 Miami (FL)	Burdine Stadium; Miami, FL (rivalry)	T 13–13	28,824	
November 18		Washington and Lee	duPont Manual Stadium; Louisville, KY	L 28–33	10,000	
November 25		at Mississippi Southern	Faulkner Field; Hattiesburg, MS	L 28–34		
^{†}Homecoming; Rankings from AP Poll released prior to the game; All times are in Central time
