= Tom Bakke =

Football player

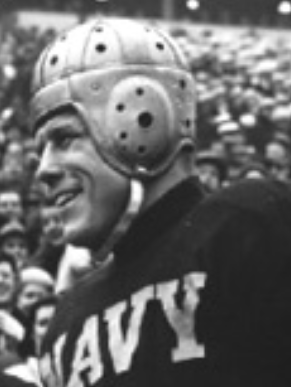

Profile
- Position: End

Personal information
- Born: February 27, 1926; Galesburg, Illinois, U.S.
- Died: December 10, 1964 (aged 38); Brevard County, Florida, U.S.
- Listed height: 6 ft 2 in (1.88 m)
- Listed weight: 190 lb (86 kg)

Career information
- College: Denver (1946–1947); Navy (1948–1950)

Thomas Neil Bakke (February 27, 1926 – December 10, 1964) was an American football player, coach and military officer. He played college football for the Denver Pioneers and Navy Midshipmen, being captain of the 1950 team that defeated Army in one of college football's greatest upsets.

Born in Galesburg, Illinois, Bakke lived in Illinois, Iowa, Wisconsin, Missouri, Oklahoma and then Colorado growing up due to his father moving repeatedly with a railroad job. He was a nephew of Colorado Supreme Court justice Norris C. Bakke. Bakke served in World War II in the Mariana Islands. He lived in Denver, Colorado, starting in 1945 and attended the University of Denver from 1946. He played football for the Denver Pioneers and helped them win the conference championship in 1946 while being an end. Bakke remained with the Pioneers in 1947 and was named co-Big Seven Conference Lineman of the Week after a win over BYU. He was named an honorable mention all-conference selection at the end of the season and was also selected to some All-America teams, according to The Capital.

Bakke left Denver to enroll at the United States Naval Academy in 1948. He played for the Navy Midshipmen football team in 1949 and after the season was selected team captain for 1950. His selection as captain was noted as unusual due to it being only his junior year there, although he was ineligible for his senior season due to his playing for Denver. He was injured early in the 1950 season but was able to return for the annual Army–Navy Game. Army had an undefeated record, was a 21-point favorite, and had defeated Navy 38–0 the prior year, but Bakke led his team to a stunning 14–2 win in what is considered one of the greatest upsets in college football history. He afterwards played in the Mahi Shrine Temple Christmas College All-Star Game.

Bakke served in the United States Air Force following his graduation from Navy. He was a jet fighter pilot toured Alaska for several years, helping coach the football team at Ladd Air Force Base from 1954 to 1955. He later served as the end coach of the Air Force Falcons. He married Jean Marshall in 1953 and had four children with her; she died after giving birth to the fourth in 1960. Bakke died in December 1964, at the age of 38, after getting into a plane crash in Florida.
