= Charles Maloy =

American football quarterback (1932–2024)

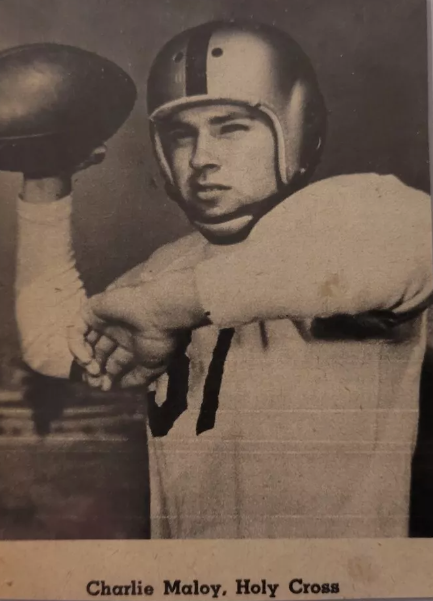
- Charles Maloy, 1952

Profile
- Position: Quarterback

Personal information
- Born: January 22, 1932; Rochester, New York, U.S.
- Died: July 5, 2024 (aged 92)
- Listed height: 6 ft 0 in (1.83 m)
- Listed weight: 175 lb (79 kg)

Career information
- College: Holy Cross (1949–1952)

Charles T. Maloy (January 22, 1932 – June 5, 2024), sometimes referred to as "Chuckin' Charley", was an American football quarterback for the Holy Cross Crusaders.

Maloy grew up in Rochester, New York.

As a sophomore in 1950, Maloy ranked first among major college football players in passes attempted (242), fifth in passing yardage (1,572), and 11th in total offense (1,560 yards).

Maloy was selected by both the Associated Press (AP) and United Press (UP) as the first-team quarterback on the 1951 and 1952 All-Eastern football teams. As a senior in 1952, Maloy ranked fifth in total offense (1,589 yards) and seventh in passing yards (1,514 yards). He also established eastern records in 1952 for offensive plays (346) and passes thrown (126) and also set career records with 301 completions in 689 attempts for 4,074 yards. He also won the George W. Bulger-Lowe trophy in 1952 as the most outstanding college player in New England.

Maloy later attended law school at Boston University, served in the Army in the late 1950s, served on the Rochester city council from 1962 to 1965, and later became a judge and politician in Rochester.

Maloy was inducted into the Holy Cross Hall of Fame in 1969.

Maloy died on June 5, 2024, at the age of 92.
