= Meriel Michelson =

American football halfback

Profile
- Position: Halfback

Personal information
- Born: October 14, 1923; Buffalo Lake, Minnesota, U.S.
- Died: July 18, 2007 (aged 83); Pasco, Washington, U.S.

Career information
- College: Eastern Washington (1947–1950)

Meriel E. "Mike" Michelson (October 14, 1923 – July 18, 2007) was an American football halfback.

Michelson was born in Buffalo Lake, Minnesota, and grew up in Pasco, Washington. He served in the United States Army Air Corps during World War II. He served in the European, Middle Eastern, and Afican theatres of operation.

After the war, Michelson played college footballfor the Eastern Washington team from 1947 to 1950. As a senior in 1950, he led all players in small college football with 1,234 rushing yards on 180 carries for an average of 6.86 yards per carries. He also set a school record with 224 rushing yards against British Columbia in 1950. He also held the school's career rushing record (2,517 yards) until 1988.

Michelson later worked for 31 years as a teacher, coach, and counselor at McLoughlin Junior High School in his hometown of Pasco. He died in 2007 at the age of 83.
