= Bob Smith (fullback) =

American football player (1929–2005)

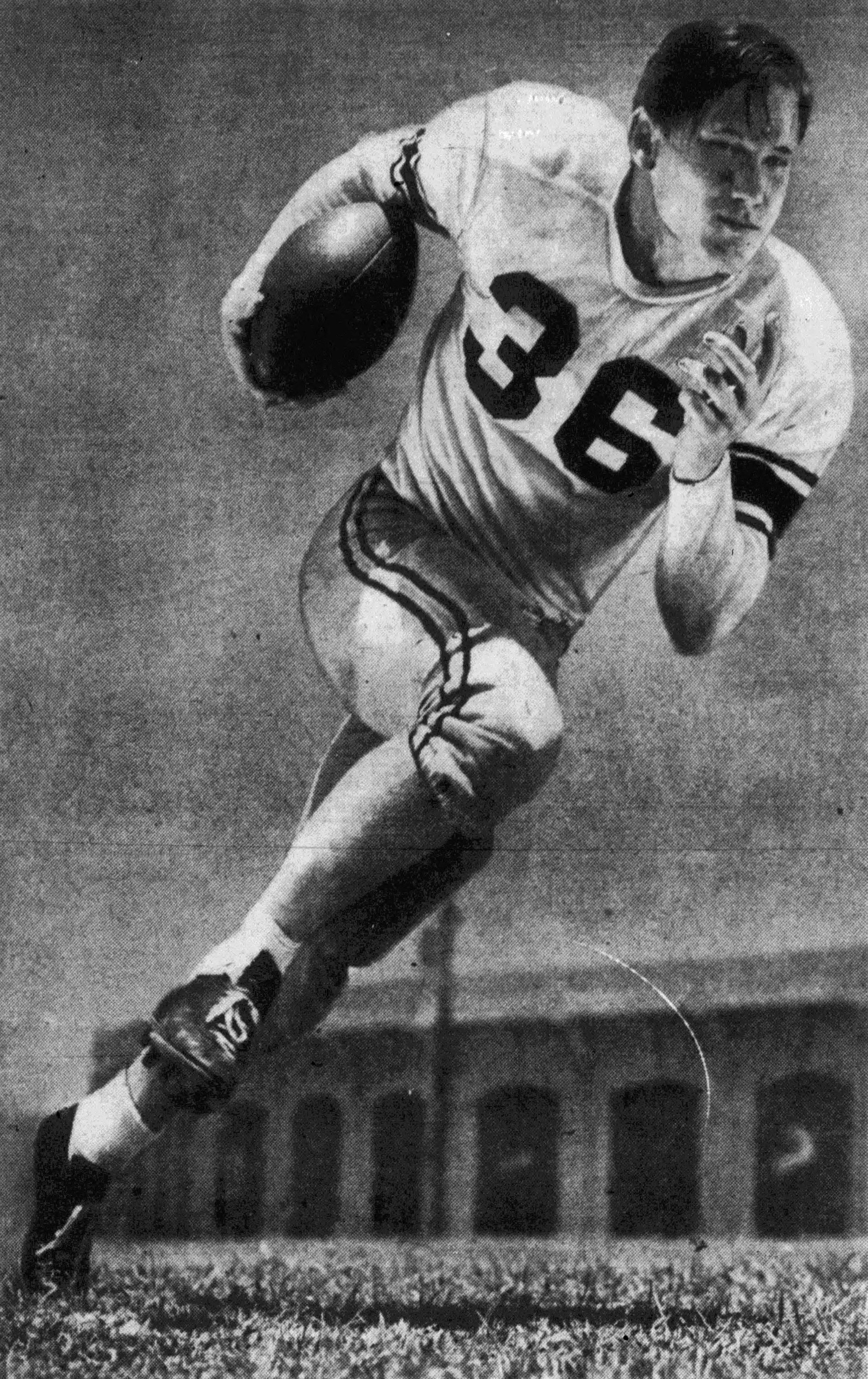
- Smith, circa 1951

No. 36
- Position: Fullback

Personal information
- Born: February 28, 1929; Dallas, Texas, U.S.
- Died: January 5, 2005 (aged 75); Dallas, Texas, U.S.
- Listed height: 6 ft 0 in (1.83 m)
- Listed weight: 205 lb (93 kg)

Career information
- High school: Lamar (Houston, Texas)
- College: Texas A&M (1948–1951)
- NFL draft: 1951: 4th round, 41st overall pick

Career history
- Detroit Lions (1953–1954)

Awards and highlights
- NFL champion (1953); First-team All-SWC (1950); Second-team All-SWC (1949)

Career NFL statistics
- Rushing yards: 52
- Rushing average: 5.8
- Receptions: 1
- Receiving yards: 11
- Stats at Pro Football Reference

Robert Lee Smith (February 28, 1929 – January 5, 2005) was an American professional football fullback who played two seasons with the Detroit Lions of the National Football League (NFL). He was selected by the Cleveland Browns in the fourth round of the 1951 NFL draft. He played college football at Texas A&M University.

== Early life ==
Robert Lee Smith was born on February 28, 1929, in Dallas, Texas. His family moved to Houston, Texas when Smith was in seventh grade. He attended Mirabeau B. Lamar Senior High School in Houston.

== College career ==
Smith was a member of the Texas A&M Aggies from 1948 to 1951, and a three-year letterman from 1949 to 1951. He earned Associated Press (AP) and United Press (UP) second-team All-Southwest Conference (SWC) honors in 1949. In 1950, he totaled 219 rushing attempts for 1,416 yards and 14 touchdowns, eight catches for 116 yards and one touchdown, and one completion on two passing attempts for five yards, one touchdown, and one interception, garnering AP and UP first-team All-SWC recognition. He was the first player in SWC history to rush for at least 1,000 yards in one season. He also rushed for 297 yards in a game against the SMU Mustangs that year, setting a single-game school record. The Texas Sportswriters Association named him the Texas Athlete of the Year in 1950. Oklahoma Sooners head coach Bud Wilkinson said Smith "leaves me breathless. He may be the greatest runner I've ever seen." Smith totaled 95 carries for 419 yards and one touchdown in 1951 while also catching seven passes for 111 yards and one touchdown. He was inducted into the Texas A&M Athletic Hall of Fame in 1969.

== Professional career ==
Smith was selected by the Cleveland Browns in the fourth round, with the 41st overall pick, of the 1951 NFL draft but returned to Texas A&M for his final season of college football. After college, he served as a lieutenant in the United States Air Force during the Korean War.

Smith's NFL draft rights were later purchased by the Detroit Lions. He played in three games, starting one, for the Lions during the 1953 season, recording six carries for 51 yards and one reception for 11 yards. On December 27, 1953, the Lions beat the Cleveland Browns in the 1953 NFL Championship Game. He appeared in 12 games during the 1954 season, rushing three times for one yard. He also played in one playoff game that year. Smith was teammates with defensive back Bob Smith during his time with the Lions. Smith became a free agent after the 1955 season.

== Personal life ==
Smith later worked as an engineer on oil rigs and opened his own print shop. He died on January 5, 2005, in Dallas at the age of 75 after suffering a heart attack and stroke earlier in the week.
