= 1950 Memphis State Tigers football team =

American college football season

1950 Memphis State Tigers football
- Conference: Independent
- Record: 9–2
- Head coach: Ralph Hatley (4th season)
- Home stadium: Crump Stadium

1950 Southern college football independents records
	Conf.			Overall
Team	W	L	T	W		L		T
Maryland State		–		8	–	0	–	0
No. 15 Miami (FL)		–		9	–	1	–	1
Memphis State		–		9	–	2	–	0
Virginia		–		8	–	2	–	0
Tampa		–		5	–	4	–	0
Grambling		–		5	–	4	–	1
Texas State		–		5	–	5	–	1
Houston		–		4	–	6	–	0
Louisville		–		3	–	6	–	1
Navy		–		3	–	6	–	0
Sewanee		–		3	–	6	–	0
Delaware		–		2	–	5	–	1
Georgetown		–		2	–	7	–	0
Chattanooga		–		1	–	9	–	0
Rankings from AP Poll

The 1950 Memphis State Tigers football team was an American football team that represented Memphis State College (now known as the University of Memphis) as an independent during the 1950 college football season. In their fourth season under head coach Ralph Hatley, Memphis State compiled a 9–2 record.

== Schedule ==
Date	Time	Opponent	Site	Result	Attendance	Source
September 16		Union (TN)	Crump Stadium; Memphis, TN	W 64–0	5,152	
September 22		Ole Miss	Crump Stadium; Memphis, TN (rivalry)	L 7–39	21,671	
September 30		Memphis NAS	Crump Stadium; Memphis, TN	W 76–7		
October 6		at Chattanooga	Chamberlain Field; Chattanooga, TN	W 26–8	7,000	
October 14	2:00 p.m.	Washington University	Crump Stadium; Memphis, TN	W 54–0	3,559	
October 21		Southwestern Louisiana	Crump Stadium; Memphis, TN	W 20–0		
October 28		vs. Murray State	Paris, TN	W 23–6		
November 4		at Louisiana College	Alumni Field; Pineville, LA	W 25–12	2,000	
November 11		Arkansas State	Crump Stadium; Memphis, TN (rivalry)	W 60–7		
November 18		Vanderbilt	Crump Stadium; Memphis, TN	L 13–29	9,548	
December 1		at Louisiana Tech	Tech Stadium; Ruston, LA	W 6–0		
All times are in Central time
