= 1951 Little All-America college football team =

American college football all-star team

The 1951 Little All-America college football team is composed of college football players from small colleges and universities who were selected by the Associated Press (AP) as the best players at each position. For 1951, the AP changed its procedure by selecting three separate groups: a first team, a defensive platoon, and a second team.

== First team ==
Position	Player	Team
Offense
B	Robert Miller	Emory & Henry
B	Robert Flanagan	St. Ambrose
B	Joseph Pahr	Valparaiso
B	Ralph Di Micco	Alfred
E	Dale Bruce	Ohio Wesleyan
E	Haldo Norman	Gustavus Adolphus
T	Lester Wheeler	Abilene Christian
T	Robert Williamson	San Francisco
G	William Chal	Kansas State Teachers
G	William Dawkins	Florida State
C	Jim Hazlett	Susquehanna
Defense
DE	Jack Wilson	Randolph–Macon
DE	James Terry	Stephen F. Austin
DT	George Young	Bucknell
DT	Chester Lagod	Chattanooga
MG	Charles Salmon	Williams
MG	Vic Makovitch	Western Maryland
LB	Tito Carinci	Xavier
LB	Ken Spencer	St. Lawrence
DB	Jack Beeler	Wofford
DB	Norman Hash	Western Washington
DB	Ray Renfro	North Texas State

== Second team ==
Position	Player	Team
B	Robert Heimerdinger	Northern Illinois State
B	Andy Macdonald	Central Michigan
B	Robert White	New Mexico Western
B	Walter Kohanowich	Hofstra
E	Bernard Calendar	Louisiana College
E	Holland Aplin	Tampa
T	Sal Gero	Elon
T	Nick Bova	Lebanon Valley
G	Peter Pocius	Maine
G	Skippy Jobson	Trinity (TX)
C	Gerald Wenzel	St. Joseph's (IN)

== See also ==
- 1951 College Football All-America Team
