= 1950 Southern Jaguars football team =

American college football season

1950 Southern Jaguars football

Black college national co-champion SWAC champion
- Conference: Southwestern Athletic Conference
- Record: 10–0–1 (7–0 SWAC)
- Head coach: Ace Mumford (15th season)
- Home stadium: University Stadium

1950 Southwestern Athletic Conference football standings
	Conf.					Overall
Team	W		L		T	W		L		T
No. 2 Southern $	7	–	0	–	0	10	–	0	–	1
No. 5 Langston	6	–	1	–	0	9	–	1	–	0
No. 22 Bishop	5	–	2	–	0	7	–	3	–	1
No. 18 Prairie View A&M	4	–	3	–	0	6	–	4	–	1
Arkansas AM&N	2	–	5	–	0	4	–	6	–	1
Wiley	2	–	5	–	0	3	–	6	–	1
Texas College	1	–	5	–	1	1	–	9	–	1
Samuel Huston	0	–	6	–	1	0	–	6	–	2
$ – Conference champion; Rankings from the Pittsburgh Courier

The 1950 Southern Jaguars football team was an American football team that represented Southern University in the 1950 college football season. In their 15th season under head coach Ace Mumford, the Jaguars compiled a 10–0–1 record, won the SWAC championship, shut out seven of 11 opponents, and outscored all opponents by a total of 276 to 26. The team played its home games at University Stadium in Baton Rouge, Louisiana.

The team was recognized as the black college national co-champion. The only setback was a scoreless tie with Jake Gaither's national co-champion Florida A&M. In the final Dickinson rankings, three undefeated black colleges received the following point totals: Florida A&M (28.76); Southern (28.50); and Maryland State (28.00). However, Florida A&M lost to Wilberforce in the Orange Blossom Classic, after the final Dickinson rankings were released.

== Schedule ==
Date	Opponent	Site	Result	Attendance	Source
September 22	at Texas State*	Buffalo Stadium; Houston, TX	W 19–0		
September 30	vs. Wilberforce State*	State Fair Stadium; Shreveport, LA	W 24–0	5,000	
October 7	Samuel Huston	University Stadium; Baton Rouge, LA	W 59–0		
October 14	at Arkansas AM&N	Pumphrey Stadium; Pine Bluff, AR	W 26–0		
October 21	Langston	University Stadium; Baton Rouge, LA	W 46–7		
October 28	at Texas College	Steer Stadium; Tyler, TX	W 33–0	8,000	
November 4	Bishop^{†}	University Stadium; Baton Rouge, LA	W 12–7	10,000	
November 11	at Wiley	Wiley Field; Marshall, TX	W 19–6	2,000	
November 18	Florida A&M*	University Stadium; Baton Rouge, LA	T 0–0	10,000	
November 25	at Prairie View A&M	Blackshear Field; Prairie View, TX	W 3–0	6,000	
December 2	Xavier (LA)*	Municipal Stadium; Baton Rouge, LA (Pelican State Classic)	W 35–6	12,000	
*Non-conference game; ^{†}Homecoming
