= Tom Kingsford =

American football player and coach (1928–2005)

Biographical details
- Born: September 27, 1928; Missoula, Montana, U.S.
- Died: October 29, 2005 (aged 77); Peoria, Arizona, U.S.

Playing career
- 1947–1950: Montana
- Position: Quarterback

Coaching career (HC unless noted)
- 1956–1964: Polson HS (MT)
- 1965–1966: Montana (assistant)
- 1967–1977: Southern Utah

Head coaching record
- Overall: 51–51 (college)

Accomplishments and honors

Championships
- 1 RMAC Mountain Division (1970)

Thomas Roland Kingsford (September 27, 1928 – October 29, 2005) was an American football player and coach. He served as the head football coach at Southern Utah University from 1967 to 1977, compiling a record of 51–51. An accomplished quarterback at the University of Montana, Kingsford was selected by the San Francisco 49ers in the 24th round of the 1951 NFL draft but had his playing career put on hold to serve in the Korean War.

== Head coaching record ==
=== College ===
Year	Team	Overall	Conference	Standing	Bowl/playoffs
Southern Utah Thunderbirds (NAIA independent) (1967–1968)
1967	Southern Utah	3–6			
1968	Southern Utah	3–6			
Southern Utah Thunderbirds (Rocky Mountain Athletic Conference) (1969–1977)
1969	Southern Utah	4–5	2–3	4th (Mountain)	
1970	Southern Utah	6–3	5–1	T–1st (Mountain)	
1971	Southern Utah	5–5	3–3	T–3rd (Mountain)	
1972	Southern Utah	6–3	4–2	T–2nd	
1973	Southern Utah	5–4	4–2	T–2nd	
1974	Southern Utah	3–6	3–3	T–2nd	
1975	Southern Utah	3–6	1–6	7th	
1976	Southern Utah	5–5	4–5	4th	
1977	Southern Utah	8–2	7–2	3rd	
Southern Utah:		51–51	33–27		
Total:		51–51			
National championship Conference title Conference division title or championship game berth
