= 1950 All-SEC football team =

American college football all-star team

The 1950 All-SEC football team consists of American football players selected to the All-Southeastern Conference (SEC) chosen by various selectors for the 1950 college football season. Kentucky won the conference.

== All-SEC selections ==
=== Ends ===
- Bucky Curtis, Vanderbilt (AP-1, UP-1)
- Bud Sherrod, Tennessee (AP-1, UP-2)
- Al Lary, Alabama (UP-1)
- John Weigle, Georgia Tech (AP-3, UP-2)
- Bobby Walston, Georgia (AP-2)
- Al Bruno, Kentucky (AP-2)
- Bill Stribling, Ole Miss (AP-3)
- Art Tait, Miss. St. (AP-3)

=== Tackles ===
- Bob Gain, Kentucky (College Football Hall of Fame) (AP-1, UP-1)
- Paul Lea, Tulane (AP-1, UP-1)
- Pug Pearman, Tennessee (AP-2, UP-1)
- Russ Faulkinberry, Vanderbilt (AP-2)
- Bob Werckle, Vanderbilt (UP-2)
- Marion Campbell, Georgia (AP-3)
- Charlie LaPradd, Florida (AP-3)

=== Guards ===
- Mike Mizerany, Alabama (AP-1, UP-1)
- Ted Daffer, Tennessee (AP-1, UP-1)
- Rocco Principe, Georgia (AP-2, UP-2)
- Bill Wannamaker, Kentucky (AP-2, UP-2)
- Banks, Auburn (AP-3)
- Pat James, Kentucky (AP-3)

=== Centers ===
- Pat O'Sullivan, Alabama (AP-1, UP-2)
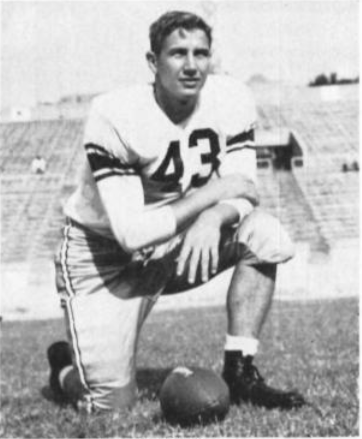
- Bob Bossons
  Bob Bossons, Georgia Tech (UP-1, AP-3)
- Doug Moseley, Kentucky (AP-2)

=== Quarterbacks ===
- Babe Parilli, Kentucky (AP-1, UP-1)
- Bill Wade, Vanderbilt (AP-2, UP-2)
- Butch Avinger, Alabama (AP-3)

=== Halfbacks ===
- Ed Salem, Alabama (AP-1, UP-1)
- Hank Lauricella, Tennessee (College Football Hall of Fame) (AP-2, UP-1)
- Ken Konz, LSU (AP-1, UP-2)
- Haywood Sullivan, Florida (AP-2, UP-2)
- Billy Mixon, Georgia (AP-3)
- Wilbur Jamerson, Kentucky (AP-3)
- Bob North, Georgia Tech (AP-3)

=== Fullbacks ===
- Kayo Dottley, Ole Miss (AP-1, UP-1)
- Bill Leskovar, Kentucky (AP-2, UP-2)

== Key ==
AP = Associated Press

UP = United Press

Bold = Consensus first-team selection by both AP and UP

== See also ==
- 1950 College Football All-America Team
