= 1950 Tulane Green Wave football team =

American college football season

1950 Tulane Green Wave football
- Top row (left to right): Harold Brinson, Don Joyce, Ellsworth Kingery, Dennis Doyle. Bottom row (left to right): Jerome Helluin, Paul Lea, Art Kleinschmidt, George Maddox
- Conference: Southeastern Conference

Ranking
- AP: No. 20
- Record: 6–2–1 (3–1–1 SEC)
- Head coach: Henry Frnka (5th season)
- Captains: Dennis Doyle; George Maddux
- Home stadium: Tulane Stadium

1950 Southeastern Conference football standings
	Conf.					Overall
Team	W		L		T	W		L		T
No. 7 Kentucky $	5	–	1	–	0	11	–	1	–	0
No. 4 Tennessee	4	–	1	–	0	11	–	1	–	0
No. 16 Alabama	6	–	2	–	0	9	–	2	–	0
No. 20 Tulane	3	–	1	–	1	6	–	2	–	1
Georgia Tech	4	–	2	–	0	5	–	6	–	0
Georgia	3	–	2	–	1	6	–	3	–	3
Mississippi State	3	–	4	–	0	4	–	5	–	0
Vanderbilt	3	–	4	–	0	7	–	4	–	0
LSU	2	–	3	–	2	4	–	5	–	2
Florida	2	–	4	–	0	5	–	5	–	0
Ole Miss	1	–	5	–	0	5	–	5	–	0
Auburn	0	–	7	–	0	0	–	10	–	0
$ – Conference champion; Rankings from AP Poll

The 1950 Tulane Green Wave football team was an American football team that represented Tulane University as a member of the Southeastern Conference (SEC) during the 1950 college football season. In its fifth year under head coach Henry Frnka, Tulane compiled a 6–2–1 record (3–1–1 in conference games), finished fourth in the SEC, outscored opponents by a total of 260 to 97, and was ranked No. 20 in the final AP poll.

Tackle Paul Lea was selected by both the Associated Press and the United Press as a first-team player on the 1950 All-SEC football team.

The Green Wave played its home games at Tulane Stadium in New Orleans.

== Schedule ==
Date	Opponent	Site	Result	Attendance	Source
September 30	Alabama	Tulane Stadium; New Orleans, LA	L 14–26	45,000	
October 7	Louisiana College*	Tulane Stadium; New Orleans, LA	W 64–0		
October 14	No. 10 Notre Dame*	Tulane Stadium; New Orleans, LA	L 9–13	73,159	
October 21	Ole Miss	Tulane Stadium; New Orleans, LA (rivalry)	W 27–20		
October 28	at Auburn	Cliff Hare Stadium; Auburn, AL (rivalry)	W 28–0		
November 11	at Navy*	Municipal Stadium; Baltimore, MD	W 27–0	20,000	
November 18	Virginia*	Tulane Stadium; New Orleans, LA	W 42–18	30,000	
November 25	Vanderbilt	Tulane Stadium; New Orleans, LA	W 35–6		
December 2	LSU	Tulane Stadium; New Orleans (Battle for the Rag)	T 14–14	74,000	
*Non-conference game; Rankings from AP Poll released prior to the game

== After the season ==
The 1951 NFL draft was held on January 18–19, 1951. The following Green Wave players were selected.

Round	Pick	Player	Position	NFL club
2	18	Don Joyce	Defensive end	Chicago Cardinals
3	38	Jerry Helluin	Defensive tackle	Cleveland Browns
4	48	George Kinek	End	Los Angeles Rams
6	74	Dan Rogas	Guard	Cleveland Browns
7	84	Paul Lea	Defensive tackle	Chicago Bears
9	104	Denny Doyle	Guard	Philadelphia Eagles
15	172	Joe Ernst	Back	Green Bay Packers
17	202	Hal Waggoner	Back	Philadelphia Eagles
30	359	Joe Shinn	End	New York Yanks
