= Angus Williams =

Angus Williams may refer to:

- Angus Williams (American football)
- Angus Williams (rugby union)
