= 1951 Gator Bowl =

American college football game

Wyoming Cowboys	Washington and Lee Generals
(9–0)	(8–2)
Skyline	SoCon
20	7
Head coach: Bowden Wyatt	Head coach: George T. Barclay
AP / Coaches; 12 / 14	AP / Coaches; 18 / NR
	1	2	3	4	Total
Wyoming	0	13	7	0	20
Washington and Lee	0	0	0	7	7
- Date: January 1, 1951
- Season: 1950
- Stadium: Gator Bowl Stadium
- Location: Jacksonville, Florida
- MVP: HB Eddie Talboom (Wyoming)
- Attendance: 26,354

The 1951 Gator Bowl was an American college football game played on January 1, 1951, at Gator Bowl Stadium in Jacksonville, Florida. It was the sixth annual Gator Bowl. The game featured the Wyoming Cowboys, champions of the Skyline Conference (also known as the Mountain States Conference), against the Washington and Lee Generals, champions of the Southern Conference.

== Background ==
The Cowboys were champions of the Mountain States Conference champions and had finished the regular season undefeated. The Generals won the Southern Conference with a perfect conference record, led by quarterback Gil Bocetti and fullback Walt Michaels, although Michaels missed the game due to appendicitis. They recorded wins over West Virginia, Virginia Tech, Louisville, and Richmond, while losing to Virginia and Tennessee. They were the first team from Virginia to play in a bowl game.

== Game summary ==
After a scoreless first quarter, the Cowboys started a crucial second quarter with an Eddie Talboom touchdown pass to Dick Campbell. A turning point in the game occurred on the General's following drive. Bocetti was driving his team down the field when his pass was intercepted by Selmer Pederson. Talboom let another drive down the field, culminating in a touchdown run by Talboom himself, making the score 13–0 at halftime. Despite outgaining the Cowboys in total yardage, the Generals failed to capitalize on their opportunities until it was too late. In the third quarter, fullback John Melton added a touchdown run, making the lead 20–0. With the outcome already decided, the Generals added a late touchdown run by Gil Bocetti, as the Cowboys secured their first-ever bowl victory. Talboom completed 10 of 14 passes for 141 yards and also rushed for 31 yards.

The attendance for the game was 26,354.

== Aftermath ==
This victory began Wyoming's streak of bowl game wins, as they went on to win three more before their first loss in 1968. They have not played in the Gator Bowl since this game. The Generals did not appear in another bowl game until after the 2022 season (as a member of Division III), when they participated in the inaugural Chesapeake Challenge bowl series, losing to Lycoming College in the Cape Charles Bowl.

== Statistics ==
Statistics	Wyoming	W&L
First downs	14	19
Yards rushing	147	252
Yards passing	141	31
Total yards	291	301
Punts-Average	5-39.0	6-29.5
Penalties-Yards	6-75	2-31
