= 1950 Kentucky Wildcats football team =

American college football season

1950 Kentucky Wildcats football

National champion (Sagarin) SEC champion Sugar Bowl champion

Sugar Bowl, W 13–7 vs. Oklahoma
- Conference: Southeastern Conference

Ranking
- Coaches: No. 7
- AP: No. 7
- Record: 11–1 (5–1 SEC)
- Head coach: Bear Bryant (5th season)
- Captains: Bob Gain; Wilbur Jamerson
- Home stadium: McLean Stadium

1950 Southeastern Conference football standings
	Conf.					Overall
Team	W		L		T	W		L		T
No. 7 Kentucky $	5	–	1	–	0	11	–	1	–	0
No. 4 Tennessee	4	–	1	–	0	11	–	1	–	0
No. 16 Alabama	6	–	2	–	0	9	–	2	–	0
No. 20 Tulane	3	–	1	–	1	6	–	2	–	1
Georgia Tech	4	–	2	–	0	5	–	6	–	0
Georgia	3	–	2	–	1	6	–	3	–	3
Mississippi State	3	–	4	–	0	4	–	5	–	0
Vanderbilt	3	–	4	–	0	7	–	4	–	0
LSU	2	–	3	–	2	4	–	5	–	2
Florida	2	–	4	–	0	5	–	5	–	0
Ole Miss	1	–	5	–	0	5	–	5	–	0
Auburn	0	–	7	–	0	0	–	10	–	0
$ – Conference champion; Rankings from AP Poll

The 1950 Kentucky Wildcats football team represented the University of Kentucky in the 1950 college football season. The offense scored 393 points while the defense allowed 69 points. Led by head coach Bear Bryant, the Wildcats were the SEC champions and won the 1951 Sugar Bowl over the 10–0 No. 1 Oklahoma Sooners.

Quarterback Babe Parilli ranked third nationally in passing yardage (1,627) and finished fourth in voting for the Heisman Trophy.

The living players from the 1950 Wildcats team were honored during halftime of a game during the 2005 season as national champions for the 1950 season, as determined by the #1 ranking in Jeff Sagarin's computer ratings released in 1990. The University of Kentucky claims this national championship.

The team ranked second in major college football in total defense, allowing an average of only 172.3 yards per game.

== Schedule ==
Date	Opponent	Rank	Site	Result	Attendance	Source
September 16	North Texas State*	No. 13	McLean Stadium; Lexington, KY	W 25–0	24,000	
September 23	LSU	No. 13	McLean Stadium; Lexington, KY	W 14–0	35,500	
September 30	Ole Miss	No. 13	McLean Stadium; Lexington, KY	W 27–0	32,000	
October 7	Dayton*	No. 6	McLean Stadium; Lexington, KY	W 40–0	20,000	
October 14	Cincinnati*	No. 5	McLean Stadium; Lexington, KY	W 41–7	35,000	
October 21	at Villanova*	No. 4	Franklin Field; Philadelphia, PA	W 34–7	17,000	
October 28	at Georgia Tech	No. 4	Grant Field; Atlanta, GA	W 28–14	35,000	
November 4	No. 17 Florida	No. 5	McLean Stadium; Lexington, KY (rivalry)	W 40–6	33,000	
November 11	at Mississippi State	No. 4	Scott Field; Starkville, MS	W 48–21	28,000	
November 18	North Dakota*	No. 5	McLean Stadium; Lexington, KY	W 83–0	20,000	
November 25	at No. 9 Tennessee	No. 3	Shields–Watkins Field; Knoxville, TN (rivalry)	L 0–7	45,000	
January 1	vs. No. 1 Oklahoma*	No. 7	Tulane Stadium; New Orleans LA (Sugar Bowl)	W 13–7	80,206	
*Non-conference game; Rankings from AP Poll released prior to the game

== Personnel ==
- QB Babe Parilli, Jr.

== Awards and honors ==
- Bob Gain: Outland Trophy, consensus All-American

== 1951 NFL draft ==
Player	Position	Round	Pick	NFL club
Bob Gain	Tackle	1	5	Green Bay Packers
Walt Yowarsky	Tackle	3	29	Washington Redskins
Al Bruno	End	3	32	Philadelphia Eagles
Bob Hope	Tackle	11	130	Philadelphia Eagles
Bill Leskovar	Back	14	163	Chicago Cardinals
Clay Webb	Back	15	176	Pittsburgh Steelers
Bill Wanamaker	Guard	15	179	New York Yanks
Dom Fucci	Back	18	210	Washington Redskins
Dick Martin	Back	28	331	Chicago Cardinals
