= 1950 Davidson Wildcats football team =

American college football season

1950 Davidson Wildcats football
- Conference: Southern Conference
- Record: 3–6 (1–5 SoCon)
- Head coach: Crowell Little (1st season)
- Home stadium: Richardson Stadium; American Legion Memorial Stadium

1950 Southern Conference football standings
	Conf.					Overall
Team	W		L		T	W		L		T
No. 18 Washington and Lee $	6	–	0	–	0	8	–	3	–	0
No. 10 Clemson	3	–	0	–	1	9	–	0	–	1
VMI	5	–	1	–	0	6	–	4	–	0
Wake Forest	6	–	1	–	1	6	–	1	–	2
Maryland	4	–	1	–	1	7	–	2	–	1
Duke	5	–	2	–	0	7	–	3	–	0
North Carolina	3	–	2	–	1	3	–	5	–	2
George Washington	4	–	3	–	0	5	–	4	–	0
NC State	4	–	4	–	1	5	–	4	–	1
William & Mary	3	–	3	–	0	4	–	7	–	0
The Citadel	2	–	3	–	0	4	–	6	–	0
South Carolina	2	–	4	–	1	3	–	4	–	2
Furman	2	–	4	–	0	2	–	8	–	1
West Virginia	1	–	3	–	0	2	–	8	–	0
Davidson	1	–	5	–	0	3	–	6	–	0
Richmond	1	–	8	–	0	2	–	8	–	0
VPI	0	–	8	–	0	0	–	10	–	0
$ – Conference champion; Rankings from AP Poll

The 1950 Davidson Wildcats football team was an American football team that represented Davidson College during the 1950 college football season as a member of the Southern Conference. In their first year under head coach Crowell Little, the Wildcats compiled an overall record of 3–6, with a mark of 1–5 in conference play, and finished in 15th place in the SoCon.

== Schedule ==
Date	Opponent	Site	Result	Attendance	Source
September 30	Furman	American Legion Memorial Stadium; Charlotte, NC	L 20–32	7,000	
October 7	at Presbyterian*	Bailey Stadium; Clinton, SC	W 24–0	4,000	
October 14	at The Citadel	Johnson Hagood Stadium; Charleston, SC	L 12–19	10,000	
October 21	Washington and Lee	Richardson Stadium; Davidson, NC	L 12–47	9,000	
October 28	Erskine*	Richardson Stadium; Davidson, NC	W 44–0	7,000	
November 4	VMI	American Legion Memorial Stadium; Charlotte, NC	L 6–46	6,000	
November 11	at NC State	Riddick Stadium; Raleigh, NC	L 7–15	3,500	
November 18	at Richmond	City Stadium; Richmond, VA	W 39–0		
November 25	at Georgia Tech*	Grant Field; Atlanta, GA	L 14–46	20,000	
*Non-conference game
