= 1950 Wake Forest Demon Deacons football team =

American college football season

1950 Wake Forest Demon Deacons football
- Conference: Southern Conference
- Record: 6–1–2 (6–1–1 SoCon)
- Head coach: Peahead Walker (14th season)
- Captain: Bob Auffarth
- Home stadium: Groves Stadium

1950 Southern Conference football standings
	Conf.					Overall
Team	W		L		T	W		L		T
No. 18 Washington and Lee $	6	–	0	–	0	8	–	3	–	0
No. 10 Clemson	3	–	0	–	1	9	–	0	–	1
VMI	5	–	1	–	0	6	–	4	–	0
Wake Forest	6	–	1	–	1	6	–	1	–	2
Maryland	4	–	1	–	1	7	–	2	–	1
Duke	5	–	2	–	0	7	–	3	–	0
North Carolina	3	–	2	–	1	3	–	5	–	2
George Washington	4	–	3	–	0	5	–	4	–	0
NC State	4	–	4	–	1	5	–	4	–	1
William & Mary	3	–	3	–	0	4	–	7	–	0
The Citadel	2	–	3	–	0	4	–	6	–	0
South Carolina	2	–	4	–	1	3	–	4	–	2
Furman	2	–	4	–	0	2	–	8	–	1
West Virginia	1	–	3	–	0	2	–	8	–	0
Davidson	1	–	5	–	0	3	–	6	–	0
Richmond	1	–	8	–	0	2	–	8	–	0
VPI	0	–	8	–	0	0	–	10	–	0
$ – Conference champion; Rankings from AP Poll

The 1950 Wake Forest Demon Deacons football team was an American football team that represented Wake Forest University during the 1950 college football season. In its 14th and final season under head coach Peahead Walker, the team compiled a 6–1–2 record and finished in fourth place in the Southern Conference. The team ranked first in major college football in total defense (163.2 yards per game) and third in rushing defense (69.6 yards per game).

== Schedule ==
Date	Opponent	Rank	Site	Result	Attendance	Source
September 22	at Boston College*		Braves Field; Boston, MA	T 7–7	12,324	
September 30	Richmond		Groves Stadium; Wake Forest, NC	W 43–0	8,000	
October 7	at William & Mary		Cary Field; Williamsburg, VA	W 47–0	12,000	
October 14	at North Carolina		Kenan Memorial Stadium; Chapel Hill, NC (rivalry)	W 13–7	43,500	
October 21	George Washington	No. 19	Groves Stadium; Wake Forest, NC	W 13–7	10,000	
October 28	vs. No. 16 Clemson	No. 17	Bowman Gray Stadium; Winston-Salem, NC	L 12–13	22,000	
November 11	at Duke		Duke Stadium; Durham, NC (rivalry)	W 13–7	25,000	
November 18	NC State	No. 16	Groves Stadium; Wake Forest, NC (rivalry)	T 6–6	18,000	
November 25	at South Carolina		Carolina Stadium; Columbia, SC	W 14–7	14,000	
*Non-conference game; Rankings from AP Poll released prior to the game

== Team leaders ==
Category	Team Leader	Att/Cth	Yds
Passing	Ed Kissell	36/70	436
Rushing	Bill Miller	178	721
Receiving	Jack Lewis	15	195
