= 1950 LSU Tigers football team =

American college football season

1950 LSU Tigers football
- Conference: Southeastern Conference
- Record: 4–5–2 (2–3–2 SEC)
- Head coach: Gaynell Tinsley (3rd season)
- Home stadium: Tiger Stadium

1950 Southeastern Conference football standings
	Conf.					Overall
Team	W		L		T	W		L		T
No. 7 Kentucky $	5	–	1	–	0	11	–	1	–	0
No. 4 Tennessee	4	–	1	–	0	11	–	1	–	0
No. 16 Alabama	6	–	2	–	0	9	–	2	–	0
No. 20 Tulane	3	–	1	–	1	6	–	2	–	1
Georgia Tech	4	–	2	–	0	5	–	6	–	0
Georgia	3	–	2	–	1	6	–	3	–	3
Mississippi State	3	–	4	–	0	4	–	5	–	0
Vanderbilt	3	–	4	–	0	7	–	4	–	0
LSU	2	–	3	–	2	4	–	5	–	2
Florida	2	–	4	–	0	5	–	5	–	0
Ole Miss	1	–	5	–	0	5	–	5	–	0
Auburn	0	–	7	–	0	0	–	10	–	0
$ – Conference champion; Rankings from AP Poll

The 1950 LSU Tigers football team was an American football team that represented Louisiana State University (LSU) as a member of the Southeastern Conference (SEC) during the 1950 college football season. In their third year under head coach Gaynell Tinsley, the team compiled an overall record of 4–5–2, with a mark of 2–3–2 in conference play, placing ninth in the SEC.

== Schedule ==
Date	Opponent	Site	Result	Attendance	Source
September 23	at No. 13 Kentucky	Stoll Field/McLean Stadium; Lexington, KY	L 0–14	35,500	
September 30	Pacific (CA)*	Tiger Stadium; Baton Rouge, LA	W 19–0	30,000	
October 7	at Rice*	Rice Stadium; Houston, TX	L 20–35	52,000	
October 14	Georgia Tech^{†}	Tiger Stadium; Baton Rouge, LA	L 0–13	42,000	
October 21	Georgia	Tiger Stadium; Baton Rouge, LA	T 13–13	25,000	
November 4	Ole Miss	Tiger Stadium; Baton Rouge, LA (rivalry)	W 40–14	30,000	
November 11	at Vanderbilt	Dudley Field; Nashville, TN	W 33–7	24,000	
November 18	Mississippi State	Tiger Stadium; Baton Rouge, LA (rivalry)	L 7–13	33,000	
November 24	Villanova*	Tiger Stadium; Baton Rouge, LA	W 13–7	10,000	
December 2	at No. 20 Tulane	Tulane Stadium; New Orleans, LA (Battle for the Rag)	T 14–14	74,000	
December 9	at No. 3 Texas*	Memorial Stadium; Austin, TX	L 6–21	35,000	
*Non-conference game; ^{†}Homecoming; Rankings from AP Poll released prior to the game
