= 1950 Clemson Tigers football team =

American college football season

1950 Clemson Tigers football

Orange Bowl champion

Orange Bowl, W 15–14 vs. Miami (FL)
- Conference: Southern Conference

Ranking
- Coaches: No. 12
- AP: No. 10
- Record: 9–0–1 (3–0–1 SoCon)
- Head coach: Frank Howard (11th season)
- Captain: Gene Moore
- Home stadium: Memorial Stadium

1950 Southern Conference football standings
	Conf.					Overall
Team	W		L		T	W		L		T
No. 18 Washington and Lee $	6	–	0	–	0	8	–	3	–	0
No. 10 Clemson	3	–	0	–	1	9	–	0	–	1
VMI	5	–	1	–	0	6	–	4	–	0
Wake Forest	6	–	1	–	1	6	–	1	–	2
Maryland	4	–	1	–	1	7	–	2	–	1
Duke	5	–	2	–	0	7	–	3	–	0
North Carolina	3	–	2	–	1	3	–	5	–	2
George Washington	4	–	3	–	0	5	–	4	–	0
NC State	4	–	4	–	1	5	–	4	–	1
William & Mary	3	–	3	–	0	4	–	7	–	0
The Citadel	2	–	3	–	0	4	–	6	–	0
South Carolina	2	–	4	–	1	3	–	4	–	2
Furman	2	–	4	–	0	2	–	8	–	1
West Virginia	1	–	3	–	0	2	–	8	–	0
Davidson	1	–	5	–	0	3	–	6	–	0
Richmond	1	–	8	–	0	2	–	8	–	0
VPI	0	–	8	–	0	0	–	10	–	0
$ – Conference champion; Rankings from AP Poll

The 1950 Clemson Tigers football team was an American football team that represented Clemson College in the Southern Conference during the 1950 college football season. In its 11th season under head coach Frank Howard, the team compiled a 9–0–1 record (3–0–1 against conference opponents), finished second in the Southern Conference, was ranked No. 10 in the final AP Poll, defeated Miami (FL) in the 1951 Orange Bowl, and outscored all opponents by a total of 344 to 76. The team played its home games at Memorial Stadium in Clemson, South Carolina.

The team set numerous single-season school records, including most points scored (344), most rushing yards (2,800), most passing yards (1,411), and most combined passing and rushing yards (4,211). In addition, fullback and team captain Fred Cone set individual single-season school records in rushing yards (845), touchdowns (15), and points scored (92). Sophomore tailback Billy Hair led the team in passing yards with 644 and also rushed for 573 yards.

Fred Cone and end Glenn Smith were selected as first-team players on the 1950 All-Southern Conference football team. Four Clemson players were named to the All-South Carolina football team for 1950: Cone, Smith, tackle Bob Patton, and back Jackie Calvert.

== Schedule ==
Date	Time	Opponent	Rank	Site	Result	Attendance	Source
September 23	8:00 p.m.	Presbyterian*		Memorial Stadium; Clemson, SC	W 55–0	18,000-20,000	
September 30	2:00 p.m.	at No. 17 Missouri*		Memorial Stadium; Columbia, MO	W 34–0	25,000	
October 7	8:00 p.m.	NC State	No. 18	Memorial Stadium; Clemson, SC (rivalry)	W 27–0	22,500	
October 19	2:00 p.m.	at South Carolina	No. 12	Carolina Stadium; Columbia, SC (rivalry)	T 14–14	35,000	
October 28	2:00 p.m.	vs. No. 17 Wake Forest	No. 16	Bowman Gray Stadium; Winston-Salem, NC	W 13–12	22,000	
November 4	2:00 p.m.	Duquesne*^{†}	No. 14	Memorial Stadium; Clemson, SC	W 53–20	17,000	
November 11	2:00 p.m.	at Boston College*	No. 13	Braves Field; Boston, MA (rivalry)	W 35–14	9,606	
November 18	2:00 p.m.	Furman	No. 11	Memorial Stadium; Clemson, SC	W 57–2	21,000	
November 25	2:00 p.m.	at Auburn*	No. 11	Cliff Hare Stadium; Auburn, AL (rivalry)	W 41–0	11,000	
January 1, 1951		vs. No. 15 Miami (FL)*	No. 10	Burdine Stadium; Miami, FL (Orange Bowl)	W 15–14	65,181	
*Non-conference game; ^{†}Homecoming; Rankings from AP Poll released prior to the game; All times are in Eastern time
