= 1950 Furman Purple Hurricane football team =

American college football season

1950 Furman Purple Hurricane football
- Conference: Southern Conference
- Record: 2–8–1 (2–4 SoCon)
- Head coach: Bill Young (1st season)
- Captain: Charlie Thomas
- Home stadium: Sirrine Stadium

1950 Southern Conference football standings
	Conf.					Overall
Team	W		L		T	W		L		T
No. 18 Washington and Lee $	6	–	0	–	0	8	–	3	–	0
No. 10 Clemson	3	–	0	–	1	9	–	0	–	1
VMI	5	–	1	–	0	6	–	4	–	0
Wake Forest	6	–	1	–	1	6	–	1	–	2
Maryland	4	–	1	–	1	7	–	2	–	1
Duke	5	–	2	–	0	7	–	3	–	0
North Carolina	3	–	2	–	1	3	–	5	–	2
George Washington	4	–	3	–	0	5	–	4	–	0
NC State	4	–	4	–	1	5	–	4	–	1
William & Mary	3	–	3	–	0	4	–	7	–	0
The Citadel	2	–	3	–	0	4	–	6	–	0
South Carolina	2	–	4	–	1	3	–	4	–	2
Furman	2	–	4	–	0	2	–	8	–	1
West Virginia	1	–	3	–	0	2	–	8	–	0
Davidson	1	–	5	–	0	3	–	6	–	0
Richmond	1	–	8	–	0	2	–	8	–	0
VPI	0	–	8	–	0	0	–	10	–	0
$ – Conference champion; Rankings from AP Poll

The 1950 Furman Purple Hurricane football team was an American football team that represented Furman University as a member of the Southern Conference (SoCon) during the 1950 college football season. Led by first-year head coach Bill Young, the Purple Hurricane compiled an overall record of 2–8–1 with a mark of 2–4 in conference play, placing 13th in the SoCon.

== Schedule ==
Date	Opponent	Site	Result	Attendance	Source
September 15	Presbyterian*	Sirrine Stadium; Greenville, SC	L 12–13	13,500	
September 23	at Washington and Lee	Wilson Field; Lexington, VA	L 6–27		
September 30	at Davidson	American Legion Memorial Stadium; Charlotte, NC	W 32–20	7,000	
October 6	South Carolina	Sirrine Stadium; Greenville, SC	L 6–21		
October 13	at Alabama*	Denny Stadium; Tuscaloosa, AL	L 6–34	12,000	
October 21	The Citadel	Sirrine Stadium; Greenville, SC (rivalry)	W 21–7	8,000	
October 28	at No. 20 Florida*	Florida Field; Gainesville, FL	L 7–19	18,000	
November 3	Wofford*	Sirrine Stadium; Greenville, SC (rivalry)	T 13–13		
November 11	George Washington	Sirrine Stadium; Greenville, SC	L 7–34	3,000	
November 18	at No. 11 Clemson	Memorial Stadium; Clemson, SC	L 2–57	21,000	
November 25	at Georgia*	Sanford Stadium; Athens, GA	L 0–40	2,000	
*Non-conference game; Rankings from AP Poll released prior to the game
