= Bob Werckle =

American football player (1929–2005)

Profile
- Position: Tackle

Personal information
- Born: September 4, 1929; Brooklyn, New York, U.S.
- Died: August 25, 2005 (aged 75); Lebanon, Tennessee, U.S.

Career information
- College: Vanderbilt (1947, 1949–1951)

Awards and highlights
- Second-team All-American (1951); First-team All-SEC (1951); Second-team All-SEC (1950)

Robert Eugene Werckle (September 4, 1929 – August 25, 2005) was a college football player. A native of New Jersey, he was a prominent tackle for the Vanderbilt Commodores, captain of the 1951 team. He died in 2005.
