= 1950 North Carolina Tar Heels football team =

American college football season

1950 North Carolina Tar Heels football
- Conference: Southern Conference
- Record: 3–5–2 (3–2–1 SoCon)
- Head coach: Carl Snavely (8th season)
- Captains: Dick Bunting; Irv Holdash
- Home stadium: Kenan Memorial Stadium

1950 Southern Conference football standings
	Conf.					Overall
Team	W		L		T	W		L		T
No. 18 Washington and Lee $	6	–	0	–	0	8	–	3	–	0
No. 10 Clemson	3	–	0	–	1	9	–	0	–	1
VMI	5	–	1	–	0	6	–	4	–	0
Wake Forest	6	–	1	–	1	6	–	1	–	2
Maryland	4	–	1	–	1	7	–	2	–	1
Duke	5	–	2	–	0	7	–	3	–	0
North Carolina	3	–	2	–	1	3	–	5	–	2
George Washington	4	–	3	–	0	5	–	4	–	0
NC State	4	–	4	–	1	5	–	4	–	1
William & Mary	3	–	3	–	0	4	–	7	–	0
The Citadel	2	–	3	–	0	4	–	6	–	0
South Carolina	2	–	4	–	1	3	–	4	–	2
Furman	2	–	4	–	0	2	–	8	–	1
West Virginia	1	–	3	–	0	2	–	8	–	0
Davidson	1	–	5	–	0	3	–	6	–	0
Richmond	1	–	8	–	0	2	–	8	–	0
VPI	0	–	8	–	0	0	–	10	–	0
$ – Conference champion; Rankings from AP Poll

The 1950 North Carolina Tar Heels football team represented the University of North Carolina at Chapel Hill during the 1950 college football season. The Tar Heels were led by eighth-year head coach Carl Snavely, and played their home games at Kenan Memorial Stadium. The team competed as a member of the Southern Conference.

Center and linebacker Irv Holdash was named a first-team All-American by the All-America Board and Associated Press.

== Schedule ==
Date	Time	Opponent	Rank	Site	Result	Attendance	Source
September 23	2:30 p.m.	NC State	No. 20	Kenan Memorial Stadium; Chapel Hill, NC (rivalry)	W 13–7	40,000	
September 30	2:00 p.m.	at No. 1 Notre Dame*	No. 20	Notre Dame Stadium; Notre Dame, IN (rivalry)	L 7–14	56,430	
October 7	2:30 p.m.	at Georgia*	No. 11	Sanford Stadium; Athens, GA	T 0–0	40,000	
October 14	2:00 p.m.	Wake Forest		Kenan Memorial Stadium; Chapel Hill, NC (rivalry)	L 7–13	43,500	
October 28	2:00 p.m.	William & Mary^{†}		Kenan Memorial Stadium; Chapel Hill, NC	W 40–7	32,000	
November 4	2:00 p.m.	at No. 11 Tennessee*		Shields–Watkins Field; Knoxville, TN	L 0–16	38,000	
November 11	2:00 p.m.	No. 18 Maryland		Kenan Memorial Stadium; Chapel Hill, NC	T 7–7	32,000	
November 18	2:00 p.m.	at South Carolina		Carolina Stadium; Columbia, SC (rivalry)	W 14–7	25,000	
November 25	2:00 p.m.	Duke		Kenan Memorial Stadium; Chapel Hill, NC (Victory Bell)	L 0–7	40,000	
December 2	2:00 p.m.	at Virginia*		Scott Stadium; Charlottesville, VA (South's Oldest Rivalry)	L 13–44	29,000–30,000	
*Non-conference game; ^{†}Homecoming; Rankings from AP Poll released prior to the game; All times are in Eastern time
