= 1950 Auburn Tigers football team =

American college football season

1950 Auburn Tigers football
- Conference: Southeastern Conference
- Record: 0–10 (0–7 SEC)
- Head coach: Earl Brown (3rd season)
- Home stadium: Cliff Hare Stadium; Cramton Bowl

1950 Southeastern Conference football standings
	Conf.					Overall
Team	W		L		T	W		L		T
No. 7 Kentucky $	5	–	1	–	0	11	–	1	–	0
No. 4 Tennessee	4	–	1	–	0	11	–	1	–	0
No. 16 Alabama	6	–	2	–	0	9	–	2	–	0
No. 20 Tulane	3	–	1	–	1	6	–	2	–	1
Georgia Tech	4	–	2	–	0	5	–	6	–	0
Georgia	3	–	2	–	1	6	–	3	–	3
Mississippi State	3	–	4	–	0	4	–	5	–	0
Vanderbilt	3	–	4	–	0	7	–	4	–	0
LSU	2	–	3	–	2	4	–	5	–	2
Florida	2	–	4	–	0	5	–	5	–	0
Ole Miss	1	–	5	–	0	5	–	5	–	0
Auburn	0	–	7	–	0	0	–	10	–	0
$ – Conference champion; Rankings from AP Poll

The 1950 Auburn Tigers football team represented Auburn University in the 1950 college football season. It was the Tigers' 59th overall and 18th season as a member of the Southeastern Conference (SEC). The team was led by head coach Earl Brown, in his third year, and played their home games at Cliff Hare Stadium in Auburn and the Cramton Bowl in Montgomery, Alabama. They finished winless with a record of zero wins and ten losses (0–10 overall, 0–7 in the SEC). In the February that followed the completion of the season, Brown was fired as head coach of the Tigers.

== Schedule ==
Date	Opponent	Site	Result	Attendance	Source
September 22	Wofford*	Cramton Bowl; Montgomery, AL	L 14–19		
September 30	at Vanderbilt	Dudley Field; Nashville, TN	L 0–41	19,000	
October 7	Southeastern Louisiana*	Cliff Hare Stadium; Auburn, AL	L 0–6		
October 14	at Florida	Florida Field; Gainesville, FL (rivalry)	L 7–27	30,000	
October 21	at Georgia Tech	Grant Field; Atlanta, GA (rivalry)	L 0–20	22,000	
October 28	Tulane	Cliff Hare Stadium; Auburn, AL (rivalry)	L 0–28		
November 4	at Mississippi State	Scott Field; Starkville, MS	L 0–27		
November 18	vs. Georgia	Memorial Stadium; Columbus, GA (rivalry)	L 10–12		
November 25	No. 11 Clemson*^{†}	Cliff Hare Stadium; Auburn, AL (rivalry)	L 0–41	11,000	
December 2	vs. No. 17 Alabama	Legion Field; Birmingham, AL (Iron Bowl)	L 0–34	39,000	
*Non-conference game; ^{†}Homecoming; Rankings from AP Poll released prior to the game
