= 1950 Richmond Spiders football team =

American college football season

1950 Richmond Spiders football
- Conference: Southern Conference
- Record: 2–8 (1–8 SoCon)
- Head coach: Karl Esleeck (3rd season)
- Captains: Douglas MacLachlan; John L. Thomas
- Home stadium: City Stadium

1950 Southern Conference football standings
	Conf.					Overall
Team	W		L		T	W		L		T
No. 18 Washington and Lee $	6	–	0	–	0	8	–	3	–	0
No. 10 Clemson	3	–	0	–	1	9	–	0	–	1
VMI	5	–	1	–	0	6	–	4	–	0
Wake Forest	6	–	1	–	1	6	–	1	–	2
Maryland	4	–	1	–	1	7	–	2	–	1
Duke	5	–	2	–	0	7	–	3	–	0
North Carolina	3	–	2	–	1	3	–	5	–	2
George Washington	4	–	3	–	0	5	–	4	–	0
NC State	4	–	4	–	1	5	–	4	–	1
William & Mary	3	–	3	–	0	4	–	7	–	0
The Citadel	2	–	3	–	0	4	–	6	–	0
South Carolina	2	–	4	–	1	3	–	4	–	2
Furman	2	–	4	–	0	2	–	8	–	1
West Virginia	1	–	3	–	0	2	–	8	–	0
Davidson	1	–	5	–	0	3	–	6	–	0
Richmond	1	–	8	–	0	2	–	8	–	0
VPI	0	–	8	–	0	0	–	10	–	0
$ – Conference champion; Rankings from AP Poll

The 1950 Richmond Spiders football team was an American football team that represented the University of Richmond as a member of the Southern Conference (SoCon) during the 1950 college football season. In their third season under head coach Karl Esleeck, Richmond compiled a 2–8 record, with a mark of 1–8 in conference play, finishing in 16th place in the SoCon.

== Schedule ==
Date	Opponent	Site	Result	Attendance	Source
September 23	Randolph–Macon*	City Stadium; Richmond, VA	W 20–6	10,000	
September 30	at Wake Forest	Groves Stadium; Wake Forest, NC	L 0–43	8,000	
October 7	VMI	City Stadium; Richmond, VA (rivalry)	L 14–26	7,000	
October 14	at West Virginia	Mountaineer Field; Morgantown, WV	L 7–46	6,000	
October 21	Duke	City Stadium; Richmond, VA	L 0–41	4,000	
November 4	NC State^{†}	City Stadium; Richmond, VA	L 0–7	3,000	
November 11	at VPI	Miles Stadium; Blacksburg, VA	W 32–12	7,000	
November 18	Davidson	City Stadium; Richmond, VA	L 0–39		
November 23	No. 19 Washington and Lee	City Stadium; Richmond, VA	L 7–67		
December 2	at William & Mary	Cary Field; Williamsburg, VA (rivalry)	L 6–40	4,000	
*Non-conference game; ^{†}Homecoming; Rankings from AP Poll released prior to the game
