= Pug Pearman =

American football player (1929–2004)

Profile
- Position: Tackle

Personal information
- Born: May 1, 1929; Mecklenburg County, North Carolina, U.S.
- Died: December 19, 2004 (aged 75); Memphis, Tennessee, U.S.

Career information
- High school: Harry P. Harding (NC)
- College: Tennessee
- NFL draft: 1951: 26th round, 309th overall pick

Awards and highlights
- First-team All-American (1951); 2× First-team All-SEC (1950, 1951)

William Andrew "Pug" Pearman (May 1, 1929 – December 19, 2004) was an American football player. A native of North Carolina, Pearman attended the University of Tennessee where he played at the tackle position for the Tennessee Volunteers football team. He was a member of the national championship 1951 Tennessee team and was selected by the Associated Press, the Football Writers Association of America, and the Newspaper Enterprise Association as a first-team player on their 1951 College Football All-America Teams.

After graduating from Tennessee, Pearman served in the U.S. Army Corps of Engineers from 1952 to 1954. He was thereafter employed by Exxon until 1970 and later by Vol Oil Company. In the 1980s, he worked for Browning-Ferris Industries.
