= 1950 Washington and Lee Generals football team =

American college football season

1950 Washington and Lee Generals football

SoCon champion

Gator Bowl, L 7–20 vs. Wyoming
- Conference: Southern Conference

Ranking
- AP: No. 18
- Record: 8–3 (6–0 SoCon)
- Head coach: George T. Barclay (2nd season)
- Home stadium: Wilson Field

1950 Southern Conference football standings
	Conf.					Overall
Team	W		L		T	W		L		T
No. 18 Washington and Lee $	6	–	0	–	0	8	–	3	–	0
No. 10 Clemson	3	–	0	–	1	9	–	0	–	1
VMI	5	–	1	–	0	6	–	4	–	0
Wake Forest	6	–	1	–	1	6	–	1	–	2
Maryland	4	–	1	–	1	7	–	2	–	1
Duke	5	–	2	–	0	7	–	3	–	0
North Carolina	3	–	2	–	1	3	–	5	–	2
George Washington	4	–	3	–	0	5	–	4	–	0
NC State	4	–	4	–	1	5	–	4	–	1
William & Mary	3	–	3	–	0	4	–	7	–	0
The Citadel	2	–	3	–	0	4	–	6	–	0
South Carolina	2	–	4	–	1	3	–	4	–	2
Furman	2	–	4	–	0	2	–	8	–	1
West Virginia	1	–	3	–	0	2	–	8	–	0
Davidson	1	–	5	–	0	3	–	6	–	0
Richmond	1	–	8	–	0	2	–	8	–	0
VPI	0	–	8	–	0	0	–	10	–	0
$ – Conference champion; Rankings from AP Poll

The 1950 Washington and Lee Generals football team was an American football team that represented Washington and Lee University in the Southern Conference during the 1950 college football season. In their second season under head coach George T. Barclay, the Generals compiled an 8–3 record, won the conference championship, and lost to Wyoming in the 1951 Gator Bowl. The team played its home games at Wilson Field in Lexington, Virginia.

== Schedule ==
Date	Opponent	Rank	Site	Result	Attendance	Source
September 23	Furman		Wilson Field; Lexington, VA	W 27–6		
September 30	vs. West Virginia		Municipal Stadium; Lynchburg, VA	W 26–7	8,000	
October 7	at The Citadel		Johnson Hagood Stadium; Charleston, SC	W 20–0	7,000	
October 14	vs. Virginia*		City Stadium; Richmond, VA (Tobacco Bowl)	L 21–26	21,500	
October 21	at Davidson		Richardson Stadium; Davidson, NC	W 47–12	9,000	
October 28	at No. 8 Tennessee*		Shields–Watkins Field; Knoxville, TN	L 20–27	20,000	
November 4	VPI		Wilson Field; Lexington, VA	W 25–7	3,000	
November 11	at Delaware*		Wilmington Park; Wilmington, DE	W 32–0	5,000	
November 18	at Louisville*		duPont Manual Stadium; Louisville, KY	W 33–28	10,000	
November 23	at Richmond	No. 19	City Stadium; Richmond, VA	W 67–7		
January 1, 1951	No. 12 Wyoming*	No. 18	Gator Bowl; Jacksonville, FL (Gator Bowl)	L 7–20	26,354	
*Non-conference game; Rankings from AP Poll released prior to the game
