= Tom Burnette =

American football player (1915–1994)

No. 19, 25
- Position: Blocking back

Personal information
- Born: July 29, 1915; Fremont, North Carolina, U.S.
- Died: September 9, 1994 (aged 79); Martinsville, Virginia, U.S.
- Listed height: 6 ft 1 in (1.85 m)
- Listed weight: 194 lb (88 kg)

Career information
- College: North Carolina
- NFL draft: 1938: 8th round, 64th overall pick

Career history
- Pittsburgh Pirates (1938); Philadelphia Eagles (1938)

Awards and highlights
- First-team All-SoCon (1937)

Career NFL statistics
- Games played: 14
- Games started: 1
- Stats at Pro Football Reference

Thomas Denmark Burnette (July 29, 1915 – September 9, 1994) was an American professional football player who was a blocking back for one season with two teams—the Pittsburgh Pirates and the Philadelphia Eagles—of the National Football League (NFL). He played college football for the North Carolina Tar Heels. Burnette was selected by the Pirates in the eighth round of the 1938 NFL draft.
