= Jim Meade =

American football player, coach, and administrator (1914–1977)

No. 49
- Position: Halfback

Personal information
- Born: February 28, 1914; Philadelphia, Pennsylvania, U.S.
- Died: August 7, 1977 (aged 63); Clayton County, Georgia, U.S.
- Listed height: 6 ft 1 in (1.85 m)
- Listed weight: 195 lb (88 kg)

Career information
- High school: Tome School (North East, Maryland)
- College: Maryland

Career history

Playing
- Washington Redskins (1939–1940)

Coaching
- Furman (1946–1951) (backfield)

Operations
- Furman (1949–1951) (athletic director)

Awards and highlights
- First-team All-SoCon (1937)

James Gordon Meade Jr. (February 28, 1914 – August 7, 1977) was an American football player, coach and college athletics administrator. He played professionally as a halfback in the National Football League (NFL) for the Washington Redskins from 1939 to 1945.

Meade played college football and lacrosse at the University of Maryland.

== Biography ==
After serving as a paratrooper in World War II, Meade became the backfield coach for the football team at Furman University from 1946 to 1951. He was also the school's athletic director from 1949 to 1951.

Meade later helped to create the Peachtree City Recreation Department and was a board member of the McIntosh Arts Council in Peachtree City, Georgia.

Meade was inducted into the University of Maryland Athletic Hall of Fame in 1982.
