= George T. Barclay =

American football player and coach (1910–1997)

- Barclay pictured in Yackety Yack 1956, North Carolina yearbook

Biographical details
- Born: May 24, 1910
- Died: October 6, 1997 (aged 87); Asheville, North Carolina, U.S.

Playing career

Football
- 1932–1934: North Carolina
- Positions: Guard, linebacker

Coaching career (HC unless noted)

Football
- 1936: VMI (line)
- 1937–1939: North Carolina (asst. freshmen)
- 1940: Oberlin (line)
- 1941–1942: Dartmouth (line)
- 1943: Georgia Pre-Flight (assistant)
- 1946: Dartmouth (line)
- 1947–1948: Maryland (assistant)
- 1949–1951: Washington and Lee
- 1952: North Carolina (assistant)
- 1953–1955: North Carolina
- 1957–1966: North Carolina (assistant)

Ice hockey
- 1942–1943: Dartmouth

Head coaching record
- Overall: 28–30–2 (football); 14–0–1 (ice hockey)
- Bowls: 0–1

Accomplishments and honors

Championships
- Football; 1 SoCon (1950)

Awards
- First-team All-American (1934); Third-team All-American (1933); First-team All-SoCon (1934); North Carolina Tar Heels No. 99 retired

George Thomas Barclay (May 24, 1910 – October 6, 1997) was an American college football player and coach. He served as the head football coach at Washington and Lee University from 1949 to 1951 and at the University of North Carolina at Chapel Hill from 1953 to 1955, compiling a career college football head coaching record of 28–30–2. Barclay was a standout guard and linebacker at North Carolina. He was a three-year starting player from 1932 to 1934. Barclay made the first team All-Southern Conference as a guard in 1933 and 1934 and was an All-American in 1934.

== Early life and playing career ==
A native of Natrona, Pennsylvania, Barclay attended The Kiski School in Saltsburg, Pennsylvania.

== Coaching career ==
While serving as head coach at Washington and Lee University, Barclay took the Generals to their only postseason bowl appearance, leading the 1950 Washington and Lee Generals football team to the Gator Bowl, where they were beaten by Wyoming. He was named the Southern Conference and Virginia Coach of the Year. Barclay became an assistant coach at Carolina under Carl Snavely. Snavely was a proponent of the single-wing offense but thought Carolina's players were more suited to the split-T formation, and Barclay helped install it there. In 1953, he was hired as the head football coach. Barclay was dismissed from his alma mater in 1955, and replaced by Jim Tatum, who had been a teammate with him at Carolina.

== Death and honors ==
Barclay died in the early morning hours of October 6, 1997, at his home in Asheville, North Carolina, following a heart attack. The George Barclay Award for outstanding linebacker at North Carolina named in his honor. He was inducted to the North Carolina Sports Hall of Fame in 1976. Barclay Road in Chapel Hill, North Carolina is named after him.

== Head coaching record ==
=== Football ===
Year	Team	Overall	Conference	Standing	Bowl/playoffs
Washington and Lee Generals (Southern Conference) (1949–1951)
1949	Washington and Lee	3–5–1	3–1–1	3rd	
1950	Washington and Lee	8–3	6–0	1st	L Gator
1951	Washington and Lee	6–4	5–1	T–3rd	
Washington and Lee:		17–12–1	14–2–1		
North Carolina Tar Heels (Atlantic Coast Conference) (1953–1955)
1953	North Carolina	4–6	2–3	T–3rd	
1954	North Carolina	4–5–1	4–2	3rd	
1955	North Carolina	3–7	3–3	T–4th	
North Carolina:		11–18–1	9–8		
Total:		28–30–2			
National championship Conference title Conference division title or championship game berth

=== Ice hockey ===
Record table
Season	Team	Overall	Conference	Standing	Postseason
Dartmouth Indians (Quadrangular League) (1942–1943)
1942–43	Dartmouth	14–0–1			
Dartmouth:		14–0–1			
Total:		14–0–1			
