= 1950 Georgia Tech Yellow Jackets football team =

American college football season

1950 Georgia Tech Yellow Jackets football
- Conference: Southeastern Conference
- Record: 5–6 (4–2 SEC)
- Head coach: Bobby Dodd (6th season)
- Captain: Bob Bossons
- Home stadium: Grant Field

1950 Southeastern Conference football standings
	Conf.					Overall
Team	W		L		T	W		L		T
No. 7 Kentucky $	5	–	1	–	0	11	–	1	–	0
No. 4 Tennessee	4	–	1	–	0	11	–	1	–	0
No. 16 Alabama	6	–	2	–	0	9	–	2	–	0
No. 20 Tulane	3	–	1	–	1	6	–	2	–	1
Georgia Tech	4	–	2	–	0	5	–	6	–	0
Georgia	3	–	2	–	1	6	–	3	–	3
Mississippi State	3	–	4	–	0	4	–	5	–	0
Vanderbilt	3	–	4	–	0	7	–	4	–	0
LSU	2	–	3	–	2	4	–	5	–	2
Florida	2	–	4	–	0	5	–	5	–	0
Ole Miss	1	–	5	–	0	5	–	5	–	0
Auburn	0	–	7	–	0	0	–	10	–	0
$ – Conference champion; Rankings from AP Poll

The 1950 Georgia Tech Yellow Jackets football team was an American football team that represented Georgia Tech as a member of the Southeastern Conference (SEC) during the 1950 college football season. In their sixth year under head coach Bobby Dodd, the team compiled an overall record of 5–6, with a mark of 4–2 in conference play, placing fifthin the SEC.

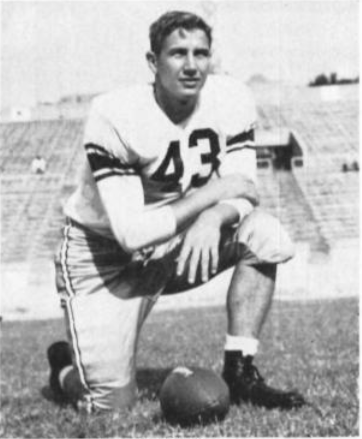
Team captain Bob Bossons

== Schedule ==
Date	Opponent	Site	Result	Attendance	Source
September 23	at No. 10 SMU*	Cotton Bowl; Dallas, TX	L 13–33	54,000	
September 30	South Carolina*	Grant Field; Atlanta, GA	L 0–7	25,000	
October 7	Florida	Grant Field; Atlanta, GA	W 16–13	21,000	
October 14	at LSU	Tiger Stadium; Baton Rouge, LA	W 13–0	42,000	
October 21	Auburn	Grant Field; Atlanta, GA (rivalry)	W 20–0	22,000	
October 28	No. 4 Kentucky^{†}	Grant Field; Atlanta, GA	L 14–28	35,000	
November 4	at Duke*	Duke Stadium; Durham, NC	L 21–30	30,000	
November 11	VMI*	Grant Field; Atlanta, GA	L 13–14	22,000	
November 18	Alabama	Grant Field; Atlanta, GA (rivalry)	L 19–54	38,000	
November 25	Davidson*	Grant Field; Atlanta, GA	W 46–14	20,000	
December 2	at Georgia	Sanford Stadium; Athens, Georgia (Clean, Old-Fashioned Hate)	W 7–0	50,000	
*Non-conference game; ^{†}Homecoming; Rankings from AP Poll released prior to the game
