= Billy Mixon =

American football player (born 1920–1984)

No. 48
- Positions: Running back, defensive back

Personal information
- Born: May 4, 1929; Tifton, Georgia, U.S.
- Died: December 7, 2006 (aged 77); Kosciusko, Mississippi, U.S.
- Listed height: 5 ft 11 in (1.80 m)
- Listed weight: 191 lb (87 kg)

Career information
- High school: Tift County (Tifton)
- College: Georgia (1947–1950)
- NFL draft: 1951: 3rd round, 28th overall pick

Career history
- San Francisco 49ers (1953–1954)

Awards and highlights
- Third-team All-SEC (1950)

Career NFL statistics
- Games played: 24
- Games started: 7
- Rushing yards: 195
- Rushing touchdowns: 1
- Receptions: 1
- Receiving yards: 7
- Interceptions: 2
- Stats at Pro Football Reference

Billy Raymond Mixon (May 24, 1929 – December 7, 2006) was an American former professional football running back and defensive back who played in the National Football League (NFL) with the San Francisco 49ers. He played college football for the Georgia Bulldogs.

== Early life ==
Mixon was born on May 24, 1929, in Tifton, Georgia. He attended Tift County High School in Tifton, where he earned All-state and All-SGFA honors. As a senior in 1946, Mixon led the state in scoring and was regarded as the best running back in the state. He reportedly gained the eyes of college scouts after he joined the “10-flat club,” running a ten second, 100-yard dash.

== College career ==
Mixon played college football for the Georgia Bulldogs from 1947 to 1950. He was a three-year letterman from 1948 to 1950. In three seasons, Mixon rushed for 1,394 yards and five touchdowns, had seven catches for 63 yards. He was named to the third-team All-SEC team in 1950.

== Professional career ==
Mixon was selected in the third round, with the 28th overall selection, by the San Francisco 49ers in the 1951 NFL draft. In 1953, he was discharged from the Marine Corps and signed with the 49ers. Mixon played in 12 games his rookie year, where he rushed for 176 yards and one touchdown. He also had one catch for seven yards.

In 1954, Mixon had 19 rushing yards and two interceptions in 12 appearances. On May 1, 1955, he became a free agent. Mixon was advised to sit out the 1955 season due to a knee injury he suffered halfway through the prior year. He later said, that at the time, the surgical procedures used today to repair knees did not exist.

== Personal life ==
After his playing career ended, Mixon worked in the insurance industry and started his own insurance company.
