= 1950 Mississippi State Maroons football team =

American college football season

1950 Mississippi State Maroons football
- Conference: Southeastern Conference
- Record: 4–5 (3–4 SEC)
- Head coach: Arthur Morton (2nd season)
- Home stadium: Scott Field

1950 Southeastern Conference football standings
	Conf.					Overall
Team	W		L		T	W		L		T
No. 7 Kentucky $	5	–	1	–	0	11	–	1	–	0
No. 4 Tennessee	4	–	1	–	0	11	–	1	–	0
No. 16 Alabama	6	–	2	–	0	9	–	2	–	0
No. 20 Tulane	3	–	1	–	1	6	–	2	–	1
Georgia Tech	4	–	2	–	0	5	–	6	–	0
Georgia	3	–	2	–	1	6	–	3	–	3
Mississippi State	3	–	4	–	0	4	–	5	–	0
Vanderbilt	3	–	4	–	0	7	–	4	–	0
LSU	2	–	3	–	2	4	–	5	–	2
Florida	2	–	4	–	0	5	–	5	–	0
Ole Miss	1	–	5	–	0	5	–	5	–	0
Auburn	0	–	7	–	0	0	–	10	–	0
$ – Conference champion; Rankings from AP Poll

The 1950 Mississippi State Maroons football team was an American football team that represented Mississippi State College as a member of the Southeastern Conference (SEC) during the 1950 college football season. In their second year under head coach Arthur Morton, the team compiled an overall record of 4–5, with a mark of 3–4 in conference play, placing seventh in the SEC.

== Schedule ==
Date	Opponent	Site	Result	Attendance	Source
September 23	Arkansas State*	Scott Field; Starkville, MS	W 67–0	8,000	
September 30	No. 4 Tennessee	Scott Field; Starkville, MS	W 7–0		
October 7	vs. Baylor*	State Fair Stadium; Shreveport, LA	L 7–14	20,000	
October 14	at Georgia	Sanford Stadium; Athens, GA	L 0–27	20,000	
October 28	at Alabama	Denny Stadium; Tuscaloosa, AL (rivalry)	L 7–14	30,000	
November 4	Auburn	Scott Field; Starkville, MS	W 27–0		
November 11	No. 4 Kentucky	Scott Field; Starkville, MS	L 21–48	28,000	
November 18	at LSU	Tiger Stadium; Baton Rouge, LA (rivalry)	W 13–7	33,000	
December 2	at Ole Miss	Hemingway Stadium; Oxford, MS (Egg Bowl)	L 20–27	28,000	
*Non-conference game; Rankings from AP Poll released prior to the game
