= 1950 Alabama Crimson Tide football team =

American college football season

1950 Alabama Crimson Tide football
- Conference: Southeastern Conference

Ranking
- Coaches: No. 17
- AP: No. 16
- Record: 9–2 (6–2 SEC)
- Head coach: Harold Drew (4th season)
- Captain: Mike Mizerany
- Home stadium: Denny Stadium; Legion Field; Ladd Stadium

1950 Southeastern Conference football standings
	Conf.					Overall
Team	W		L		T	W		L		T
No. 7 Kentucky $	5	–	1	–	0	11	–	1	–	0
No. 4 Tennessee	4	–	1	–	0	11	–	1	–	0
No. 16 Alabama	6	–	2	–	0	9	–	2	–	0
No. 20 Tulane	3	–	1	–	1	6	–	2	–	1
Georgia Tech	4	–	2	–	0	5	–	6	–	0
Georgia	3	–	2	–	1	6	–	3	–	3
Mississippi State	3	–	4	–	0	4	–	5	–	0
Vanderbilt	3	–	4	–	0	7	–	4	–	0
LSU	2	–	3	–	2	4	–	5	–	2
Florida	2	–	4	–	0	5	–	5	–	0
Ole Miss	1	–	5	–	0	5	–	5	–	0
Auburn	0	–	7	–	0	0	–	10	–	0
$ – Conference champion; Rankings from AP Poll

The 1950 Alabama Crimson Tide football team (variously "Alabama", "UA" or "Bama") represented the University of Alabama in the 1950 college football season. It was the Crimson Tide's 56th overall and 17th season as a member of the Southeastern Conference (SEC). The team was led by head coach Harold Drew, in his fourth year, and played their home games at Denny Stadium in Tuscaloosa, Legion Field in Birmingham and Ladd Stadium in Mobile, Alabama. They finished with a record of nine wins and two losses (9–2 overall, 6–2 in the SEC).

Alabama opened the season with victories over Chattanooga and Tulane before they lost their first game of the season against Vanderbilt at Ladd Stadium. The Crimson Tide rebounded the next week with a win over Furman at Denny Stadium, but lost against Tennessee at Shields-Watkins Field in week five. Alabama ten went on to win their final six games over Mississippi State, Georgia, Mississippi Southern, Georgia Tech, Florida and Auburn. Although they finished ranked in the top 20 of both major polls, the Crimson Tide did not receive a bid to play in a bowl game at the conclusion of the season.

== Schedule ==
Date	Opponent	Rank	Site	Result	Attendance
September 23	Chattanooga*		Legion Field; Birmingham, AL	W 27–0	
September 30	at Tulane		Tulane Stadium; New Orleans, LA	W 26–14	45,000
October 7	Vanderbilt	No. 12	Ladd Stadium; Mobile, AL	L 22–27	32,000
October 13	Furman*		Denny Stadium; Tuscaloosa, AL	W 34–6	12,000
October 21	at No. 18 Tennessee		Shields-Watkins Field; Knoxville, TN (Third Saturday in October)	L 9–14	50,000
October 28	Mississippi State^{†}		Denny Stadium; Tuscaloosa, AL (rivalry)	W 14–7	30,000
November 4	Georgia		Legion Field; Birmingham, AL (rivalry)	W 14–7	39,000
November 11	Mississippi Southern*		Denny Stadium; Tuscaloosa, AL	W 53–0	15,000
November 18	at Georgia Tech		Grant Field; Atlanta, GA (rivalry)	W 54–19	38,000
November 25	at Florida	No. 17	Gator Bowl; Jacksonville, FL (rivalry)	W 41–13	16,000
December 2	vs. Auburn	No. 16	Legion Field; Birmingham, AL (Iron Bowl)	W 34–0	39,000
*Non-conference game; ^{†}Homecoming; Rankings from AP Poll released prior to the game

== Game summaries ==
=== Chattanooga ===
Team	1	2	3	4	Total
Chattanooga	0	0	0	0	0
• Alabama	0	14	6	7	27

- Date: September 23
- Location: Legion Field
  Birmingham, AL

To open the 1950 season, Alabama shutout the Chattanooga Moccasins 27–0 at Legion Field. After a scoreless first quarter, Alabama recovered a Mocs fumble at their 14-yard line early in the second. On the next play, Ed Salem scored on a 14-yard run for a 7–0 Crimson Tide lead. Alabama then extended their lead to 14–0 by halftime when Salem connected with Larry Chiodetti on a 25-yard touchdown reception. In the third, Salem threw his second touchdown pass of the game to Al Lary from 53-yards out for a 20–0 lead. Bobby Wilson then closed the scoring late in the fourth quarter with his one-yard touchdown run to make the final score 27–0.

=== Tulane ===
Team	1	2	3	4	Total
• Alabama	6	7	13	0	26
Tulane	0	0	7	7	14

- Date: September 30
- Location: Tulane Stadium
  New Orleans, LA
- Game attendance: 45,000

To open conference play for the 1950 season, Alabama traveled to New Orleans and defeated Tulane 26–14 to end a three-game losing streak against the Green Wave. After a six-yard Ed Salem touchdown run gave Alabama a 6–0 lead in the first quarter, Al Lary was responsible for the final three Crimson Tide touchdown receptions. After a 26-yard reception from Salem in the second, Lary had touchdown receptions of six-yards from Butch Avinger and 41-yards from Salem in the third to give Alabama a 26–0 lead. Tulane responded with a pair of touchdowns on runs of five-yards by George Kinek and seven-yards by Alvis Batson to make the final score 26–14.

=== Vanderbilt ===
Team	1	2	3	4	Total
• Vanderbilt	14	7	6	0	27
Alabama	7	6	0	9	22

- Date: October 7
- Location: Ladd Stadium
  Mobile, Alabama
- Game attendance: 32,000

At Ladd Stadium, the Crimson Tide lost their first game of the season by a final score of 27–22 to the Vanderbilt Commodores. Vandy took a 14–0 first quarter lead on a pair of Bill Wade touchdown passes. The first was an 85-yard pass to Ernest Curtis and the second a 15-yard pass to Sylbert Cook. The Crimson Tide responded with a 15-yard Ed Salem touchdown run to make the score at the end of the first 14–7. In the second quarter, the Commodores scored on a one-yard Mac Robinson touchdown run and Alabama scored on a 17-yard Butch Avinger touchdown pass to Al Lary to make the halftime score 21–13 in favor of Vanderbilt. The Commodores scored their final points on a 21-yard Wade pass to Curtis in the third before the Crimson Tide scored nine fourth quarter points to make the final score 27–22.

=== Furman ===
Team	1	2	3	4	Total
Furman	0	0	6	0	6
• Alabama	0	14	7	13	34

- Date: October 13
- Location: Denny Stadium
  Tuscaloosa, AL
- Game attendance: 12,000

In what was the first Denny Stadium game of the 1946 season, Alabama defeated the Furman Purple Hurricane 34–6 before a crowd of 12,000 on a Friday night. After a scoreless first quarter, the Crimson Tide took a 14–0 halftime lead after touchdown runs of 52-yards by Butch Avinger and 21-yards by Ed Salem in the second quarter. After Alabama extended their lead to 21–0 on a four-yard Salem run, Furman scored their only points of the game on a three-yard Tommy Williams run to make the score at the end of the third quarter 21–6. The Crimson Tide then closed the game with a pair of fourth-quarter touchdowns first on a seven-yard Jim Burkett run and then on a 42-yard Clell Hobson pass to Al Lary to make the final score 34–6.

=== Tennessee ===
Third Saturday in October

Team	1	2	3	4	Total
Alabama	3	0	6	0	9
• #18 Tennessee	0	7	0	7	14

- Date: October 21
- Location: Shields-Watkins Field
  Knoxville, TN
- Game attendance: 50,000

Alabama lost 14–9 to the rival Tennessee Volunteers before 50,000 fans at Shields-Watkins Field in Knoxville. Harold Lutz gave the Crimson Tide a 3–0 first quarter lead with his 20-yard field goal, Alabama's first of the season. Tennessee responded with a two-yard Andy Kozar touchdown run in the second quarter to give the Vols a 7–3 halftime lead. After a 43-yard Bobby Marlow touchdown run in the third gave Alabama a 9–7 lead, Kozar scored the game-winning touchdown on a fourth-and-one play, from the Alabama one-yard line, with less than one minute remaining in the game for the 14–9 Tennessee victory.

=== Mississippi State ===
Team	1	2	3	4	Total
Mississippi State	0	0	0	7	7
• Alabama	0	0	0	14	14

- Date: October 28
- Location: Denny Stadium
  Tuscaloosa, AL
- Game attendance: 30,000

On homecoming in Tuscaloosa, the Crimson Tide defeated the Mississippi State Maroons 14–7 before the largest crowd to attend a game at Denny Stadium to date. As the teams entered the fourth quarter, the score remained scoreless. In the fourth, Alabama took a 14–0 lead on touchdown runs of three-yards by Jim Burkett and of 53-yards by James Melton. The Maroons then answered with their only touchdown of the game on a 20-yard Gil Verderver pass to Max Stainbrook and made the final score 14–7.

=== Georgia ===
Team	1	2	3	4	Total
Georgia	0	7	0	0	7
• Alabama	0	0	7	7	14

- Date: November 4
- Location: Legion Field
  Birmingham, AL
- Game attendance: 39,000

In Birmingham, Alabama defeated the Georgia Bulldogs 14–7 in cold and rainy conditions at Legion Field. After a scoreless first quarter, Georgia took a 7–0 halftime lead when Lewis Brunson scored on a one-yard touchdown run. The Crimson Tide responded with a pair of second half touchdowns and won the game 14–7. Butch Avinger scored on a one-yard run in the third and Tom Calvin scored on a one-yard run in the fourth quarter. For the game, Ed Salem passed for 193 yards on 12 completions in the win.

=== Mississippi Southern ===
Team	1	2	3	4	Total
Mississippi Southern	0	0	0	0	0
• Alabama	0	21	26	6	53

- Date: November 11
- Location: Denny Stadium
  Tuscaloosa, AL
- Game attendance: 15,000

Against the Mississippi Southern Southerners the Crimson Tide won in a 53–0 shutout at Denny Stadium. After a scoreless first quarter for the third consecutive week, Alabama took a 21–0 halftime lead on three Al Lary touchdown receptions. The first two were thrown by Ed Salem from 10 and 51-yards with the third thrown by James Melton from 21-yards. The Crimson Tide aerial attack continued into the third quarter with another three passing touchdowns, in addition to one on an interception return, to make the score 47–0 by the fourth quarter. The first was thrown 13-yards from Butch Avinger to Ed Lary; the second was thrown from three-yards from Clell Hobson to George McCain; the third was thrown nine-yards from McCain to Ed Lary; and the fourth was scored when O. E. Phillips had a 29-yard interception return. The final points were then scored in the fourth quarter on a 10-yard McCain pass to Joe Curtis to make the final score 53–0. For the game, the Alabama quarterbacks collectively completed 21 of 26 passes for 283 yards.

=== Georgia Tech ===
Team	1	2	3	4	Total
• Alabama	27	7	6	14	54
Georgia Tech	0	6	0	13	19

- Date: November 18
- Location: Grant Field
  Atlanta, GA
- Game attendance: 38,000

After Alabama scored 27 first quarter points, the Crimson Tide went on to defeat the Georgia Tech Yellow Jackets 54–19 at Grant Field in Atlanta. Bobby Marlow scored Alabama's first three touchdowns on a two-yard run, a 24-yard reception from Ed Salem and on a 91-yard run. Tom Calvin then scored the final touchdown of the quarter to give the Crimson Tide a 27–0 lead at the end of the first quarter. In the second quarter, Marlow scored his fourth touchdown of the game on a 24-yard pass from Salem, and then Tech scored their first points on a 36-yard Robert North touchdown run to make the halftime score 34–6. After George McCain scored on a two-yard run in the third, each team closed the game in the fourth quarter with a pair of touchdowns. For the Crimson Tide, Dick Barry scored on a one-yard run and on a Salem touchdown pass. The Yellow Jackets scored on a 10-yard Joe Salome pass to Henry Ferris and on a one-yard James Patton run to make the final score 54–19.

=== Florida ===
Team	1	2	3	4	Total
• #17 Alabama	7	20	2	12	41
Florida	0	0	0	13	13

- Date: November 25
- Location: Gator Bowl
  Jacksonville, FL
- Game attendance: 16,000

For the second year in a row in what was their final road game of the season, Alabama defeated the Florida Gators 41–13 in their first all-time trip to the Gator Bowl in Jacksonville. After Bobby Marlow scored on a one-yard run in the first, Ed Salem scored three second-quarter touchdowns on runs of six, eight and five-yards to give the Crimson Tide a 27–0 halftime lead. After Alabama extended their lead to 29–0 with a third quarter safety, each team scored a pair of fourth-quarter touchdowns to make the final score 41–13. The Crimson Tide scored on a one-yard Butch Avinger run and on a five-yard Larry Chiodetti run; the Gators scored on a one-yard William McGowan run and on a 70-yard Haywood Sullivan pass to Dan Howell.

=== Auburn ===
Iron Bowl

Team	1	2	3	4	Total
Auburn	0	0	0	0	0
• #16 Alabama	6	7	14	7	34

- Date: December 2
- Location: Legion Field
  Birmingham, AL
- Game attendance: 39,000

A year after they were upset by Auburn 14–13, Alabama scored touchdowns in all four quarters and shutout the Tigers 34–0 at Legion Field. Bobby Marlow scored the first three touchdowns for the Crimson Tide on a 26-yard reception from Ed Salem in the first, and on runs of seven and two yards in the second and third quarters. A 31-yard Larry Chiodetti run in the third and one-yard Jim Burkett run in the fourth quarter provided the final 34–0 margin.

== Personnel ==
=== Varsity letter winners ===
Player	Hometown	Position
Butch Avinger	Montgomery, Alabama	Quarterback
Jack Brown	Selma, Alabama	Quarterback
Jim Burkett	Dothan, Alabama	Fullback
Tom Calvin	Athens, Alabama	Halfback
Larry Chiodetti	Philadelphia, Pennsylvania	Halfback
Joe Compton	Sylacauga, Alabama	Fullback
Bob Conway	Fort Wayne, Indiana	Halfback
L. B. Couch	Alabama City, Alabama	Center
Joe Curtis	Birmingham, Alabama	End
Herb Hannah	Athens, Alabama	Guard
Sandy Helms	Tuscaloosa, Alabama	Guard
Clell Hobson	Tuscaloosa, Alabama	Quarterback
Travis Hunt	Albertville, Alabama	Tackle
Jug Jenkins	Eufaula, Alabama	End
Lint Jordan	Monticello, Georgia	End
Al Lary	Northport, Alabama	End
Ed Lary	Northport, Alabama	End
Larry Lauer	Wilmette, Illinois	Center
Harold Lutz	Clinton, Iowa	End
Harold Manley	Winfield, Alabama	End
Van Marcus	Birmingham, Alabama	Tackle
Bobby Marlow	Troy, Alabama	Halfback
Dave Mayfield	Jacksonville, Florida	Tackle
George McCain	Clanton, Alabama	Halfback
James Melton	Wetumpka, Alabama	Halfback
Fred Mims	Birmingham, Alabama	Guard
Mike Mizerany	Birmingham, Alabama	Guard
Pat O'Sullivan	New Orleans, Louisiana	Linebacker
Jess Richardson	Philadelphia, Pennsylvania	Guard
Ed Salem	Birmingham, Alabama	Halfback
Tom Selman	Rome, Georgia	Tackle
Roy Smalley	Birmingham, Alabama	Guard
Elliott Speed	Selma, Alabama	Center
Jerry Watford	Gadsden, Alabama	Guard
Al Wilhite	Tuscumbia, Alabama	Tackle
Bobby Wilson	Bay Minette, Alabama	Quarterback

=== Coaching staff ===
Name	Position	Seasons at Alabama	Alma mater (year)
Harold Drew	Head coach	17	Bates (1916)
Lew Bostick	Assistant coach	7	Alabama (1939)
Tilden Campbell	Assistant coach	11	Alabama (1935)
Hank Crisp	Assistant coach	23	VPI (1920)
Joe Kilgrow	Assistant coach	7	Alabama (1937)
Malcolm Laney	Assistant coach	7	Alabama (1932)
Tom Lieb	Assistant coach	5	Notre Dame (1923)
