= 1950 William & Mary Indians football team =

American college football season

1950 William & Mary Indians football
- Conference: Southern Conference
- Record: 4–7 (3–3 SoCon)
- Head coach: Rube McCray (7th season)
- Captains: Vito Ragazzo; Joe Mark
- Home stadium: Cary Field

1950 Southern Conference football standings
| | Conf. | | | | | Overall |
| Team | W | | L | | T | W | | L | | T |
|---|---|---|---|---|---|---|---|---|---|---|
| No. 18 Washington and Lee $ | 6 | – | 0 | – | 0 | 8 | – | 3 | – | 0 |
| No. 10 Clemson | 3 | – | 0 | – | 1 | 9 | – | 0 | – | 1 |
| VMI | 5 | – | 1 | – | 0 | 6 | – | 4 | – | 0 |
| Wake Forest | 6 | – | 1 | – | 1 | 6 | – | 1 | – | 2 |
| Maryland | 4 | – | 1 | – | 1 | 7 | – | 2 | – | 1 |
| Duke | 5 | – | 2 | – | 0 | 7 | – | 3 | – | 0 |
| North Carolina | 3 | – | 2 | – | 1 | 3 | – | 5 | – | 2 |
| George Washington | 4 | – | 3 | – | 0 | 5 | – | 4 | – | 0 |
| NC State | 4 | – | 4 | – | 1 | 5 | – | 4 | – | 1 |
| William & Mary | 3 | – | 3 | – | 0 | 4 | – | 7 | – | 0 |
| The Citadel | 2 | – | 3 | – | 0 | 4 | – | 6 | – | 0 |
| South Carolina | 2 | – | 4 | – | 1 | 3 | – | 4 | – | 2 |
| Furman | 2 | – | 4 | – | 0 | 2 | – | 8 | – | 1 |
| West Virginia | 1 | – | 3 | – | 0 | 2 | – | 8 | – | 0 |
| Davidson | 1 | – | 5 | – | 0 | 3 | – | 6 | – | 0 |
| Richmond | 1 | – | 8 | – | 0 | 2 | – | 8 | – | 0 |
| VPI | 0 | – | 8 | – | 0 | 0 | – | 10 | – | 0 |
$ – Conference champion; Rankings from AP Poll

The 1950 William & Mary Indians football team represented the College of William & Mary as a member of the Southern Conference (SoCon) during the 1950 college football season. Led by seventh-year head coach Rube McCray, the Indians compiled an overall record of 4–7 with a mark of 3–3 in conference play, and finished tenth in the SoCon. William & Mary played home games at Cary Field in Williamsburg, Virginia.

== Schedule ==
| Date | Time | Opponent | Site | Result | Attendance | Source |
|---|---|---|---|---|---|---|
| September 23 | | vs. VMI | Victory Stadium; Roanoke, VA (rivalry) | L 19–25 | | |
| September 30 | | Cincinnati* | Cary Field; Williamsburg, VA | W 20–14 | 7,500 | |
| October 7 | | Wake Forest^{†} | Cary Field; Williamsburg, VA | L 0–47 | 12,000 | |
| October 14 | | at No. 20 Michigan State* | Macklin Stadium; East Lansing, MI | L 14–33 | 35,656 | |
| October 21 | | at VPI | Miles Stadium; Blacksburg, VA | W 54–0 | 11,000 | |
| October 28 | | at North Carolina | Kenan Memorial Stadium; Chapel Hill, NC | L 7–40 | 32,000 | |
| November 4 | 1:30 p.m. | at Boston University* | Fenway Park; Boston, MA | L 14–16 | 3,606 | |
| November 11 | | at Virginia* | Scott Stadium; Charlottesville, VA | L 0–13 | 33,000 | |
| November 18 | | at Houston* | Houston Stadium; Houston, TX | L 18–36 | 25,342 | |
| November 25 | | vs. NC State | Foreman Field; Norfolk, VA (Oyster Bowl) | W 34–0 | 15,000 | |
| December 2 | | Richmond | Cary Field; Williamsburg, VA (rivalry) | W 40–6 | 4,000 | |
*Non-conference game; ^{†}Homecoming; Rankings from AP Poll released prior to the game

== NFL draft selections ==
| Year | Round | Pick | Overall | Name | Team | Position |
|---|---|---|---|---|---|---|
| 1951 | 17 | 6 | 201 | Ted Gehlmann | Pittsburgh Steelers | Tackle |
