= 1950 VMI Keydets football team =

American college football season

1950 VMI Keydets football
- Conference: Southern Conference
- Record: 6–4 (5–1 SoCon)
- Head coach: Tom Nugent (2nd season)
- Home stadium: Wilson Field

1950 Southern Conference football standings
	Conf.					Overall
Team	W		L		T	W		L		T
No. 18 Washington and Lee $	6	–	0	–	0	8	–	3	–	0
No. 10 Clemson	3	–	0	–	1	9	–	0	–	1
VMI	5	–	1	–	0	6	–	4	–	0
Wake Forest	6	–	1	–	1	6	–	1	–	2
Maryland	4	–	1	–	1	7	–	2	–	1
Duke	5	–	2	–	0	7	–	3	–	0
North Carolina	3	–	2	–	1	3	–	5	–	2
George Washington	4	–	3	–	0	5	–	4	–	0
NC State	4	–	4	–	1	5	–	4	–	1
William & Mary	3	–	3	–	0	4	–	7	–	0
The Citadel	2	–	3	–	0	4	–	6	–	0
South Carolina	2	–	4	–	1	3	–	4	–	2
Furman	2	–	4	–	0	2	–	8	–	1
West Virginia	1	–	3	–	0	2	–	8	–	0
Davidson	1	–	5	–	0	3	–	6	–	0
Richmond	1	–	8	–	0	2	–	8	–	0
VPI	0	–	8	–	0	0	–	10	–	0
$ – Conference champion; Rankings from AP Poll

The 1950 VMI Keydets football team was an American football team that represented the Virginia Military Institute (VMI) during the 1950 college football season as a member of the Southern Conference. In their second year under head coach Tom Nugent, the team compiled an overall record of 6–4.

== Schedule ==
Date	Opponent	Site	Result	Attendance	Source
September 23	vs. William & Mary	Victory Stadium; Roanoke, VA (rivalry)	W 25–19		
September 29	at George Washington	George Washington HS Stadium; Alexandria, VA	L 12–15	15,000	
October 7	at Richmond	City Stadium; Richmond, VA (rivalry)	W 26–14	7,000	
October 14	at Texas A&M*	Kyle Field; College Station, TX	L 0–52	20,000	
October 21	at Virginia*	Scott Stadium; Charlottesville, VA	L 13–26	22,000	
October 28	Catawba*	Wilson Field; Lexington, VA	L 13–14	6,000	
November 4	at Davidson	American Legion Memorial Stadium; Charlotte, NC	W 46–6	6,000	
November 11	at Georgia Tech*	Grant Field; Atlanta, GA	W 14–13	22,000	
November 18	The Citadel	Wilson Field; Lexington, VA (rivalry)	W 13–7		
November 23	vs. VPI	Victory Stadium; Roanoke, VA (rivalry)	W 27–0	25,000	
*Non-conference game
