= 1950 Tennessee Volunteers football team =

American college football season

1950 Tennessee Volunteers football

National champion (Billingsley, DeVold, Dunkel, CFRA, NCF) Co-national champion (Sagarin) Cotton Bowl Classic champion

Cotton Bowl Classic, W 20–14 vs. Texas
- Conference: Southeastern Conference

Ranking
- Coaches: No. 3
- AP: No. 4
- Record: 11–1 (4–1 SEC)
- Head coach: Robert Neyland (19th season)
- Offensive scheme: Single-wing
- Base defense: Multiple
- Home stadium: Shields–Watkins Field

1950 Southeastern Conference football standings
	Conf.					Overall
Team	W		L		T	W		L		T
No. 7 Kentucky $	5	–	1	–	0	11	–	1	–	0
No. 4 Tennessee	4	–	1	–	0	11	–	1	–	0
No. 16 Alabama	6	–	2	–	0	9	–	2	–	0
No. 20 Tulane	3	–	1	–	1	6	–	2	–	1
Georgia Tech	4	–	2	–	0	5	–	6	–	0
Georgia	3	–	2	–	1	6	–	3	–	3
Mississippi State	3	–	4	–	0	4	–	5	–	0
Vanderbilt	3	–	4	–	0	7	–	4	–	0
LSU	2	–	3	–	2	4	–	5	–	2
Florida	2	–	4	–	0	5	–	5	–	0
Ole Miss	1	–	5	–	0	5	–	5	–	0
Auburn	0	–	7	–	0	0	–	10	–	0
$ – Conference champion; Rankings from AP Poll

The 1950 Tennessee Volunteers football team represented the University of Tennessee in the 1950 college football season. Led by head coach Robert Neyland, the Volunteers lost only one game, a 7–0 upset at Mississippi State in the second game of the season. The Vols handed #3 Kentucky, coached by Bear Bryant, its only loss and defeated #3 Texas in the Cotton Bowl Classic en route to an 11–1 record.

Big Seven champion Oklahoma finished the regular season 10–0 and was named national champions by the AP Poll, but lost to Kentucky, whom Tennessee earlier defeated, in the Sugar Bowl. Tennessee was the only top five team that year to win their bowl game. Tennessee was named national champion by NCAA-designated major selectors of Billingsley, DeVold, Dunkel, College Football Researchers Association, and National Championship Foundation, while named co-champion by Sagarin (ELO-Chess).

== Prominent players ==
The 1950 Tennessee team featured Hank Lauricella, the following season's Heisman Trophy runner-up, and Doug Atkins, a future member of both the College Football Hall of Fame and the Pro Football Hall of Fame. In addition, guard Ted Daffer and tackle Bill "Pug" Pearman were named as All-Americans in 1950.

== Schedule ==
Date	Opponent	Rank	Site	Result	Attendance	Source
September 23	Mississippi Southern*	No. 4	Shields–Watkins Field; Knoxville, TN	W 56–0	23,000	
September 30	at Mississippi State	No. 4	Scott Field; Starkville, MS	L 0–7		
October 7	at No. 14 Duke*		Duke Stadium; Durham, NC	W 28–7	30,000	
October 14	Chattanooga*	No. 14	Shields–Watkins Field; Knoxville, TN	W 41–0	15,000	
October 21	Alabama	No. 18	Shields–Watkins Field; Knoxville, TN (Third Saturday in October)	W 14–9	50,000	
October 28	Washington and Lee*	No. 8	Shields–Watkins Field; Knoxville, TN	W 27–20	20,000	
November 4	North Carolina*^{†}	No. 11	Shields–Watkins Field; Knoxville, TN	W 16–0	38,000	
November 11	Tennessee Tech*	No. 11	Shields–Watkins Field; Knoxville, TN	W 48–14		
November 18	Ole Miss	No. 9	Shields–Watkins Field; Knoxville, TN (rivalry)	W 35–0		
November 25	No. 3 Kentucky	No. 9	Shields–Watkins Field; Knoxville, TN (rivalry)	W 7–0	45,000	
December 2	at Vanderbilt	No. 4	Dudley Field; Nashville, TN (rivalry)	W 43–0	28,000	
January 1	vs. No. 3 Texas*	No. 4	Cotton Bowl; Dallas, TX (Cotton Bowl Classic)	W 20–14	75,500	
*Non-conference game; ^{†}Homecoming; Rankings from AP Poll released prior to the game
