= 1950 NC State Wolfpack football team =

American college football season

1950 NC State Wolfpack football
- Conference: Southern Conference
- Record: 5–4–1 (4–4–1 SoCon)
- Head coach: Beattie Feathers (7th season)
- Home stadium: Riddick Stadium

1950 Southern Conference football standings
	Conf.					Overall
Team	W		L		T	W		L		T
No. 18 Washington and Lee $	6	–	0	–	0	8	–	3	–	0
No. 10 Clemson	3	–	0	–	1	9	–	0	–	1
VMI	5	–	1	–	0	6	–	4	–	0
Wake Forest	6	–	1	–	1	6	–	1	–	2
Maryland	4	–	1	–	1	7	–	2	–	1
Duke	5	–	2	–	0	7	–	3	–	0
North Carolina	3	–	2	–	1	3	–	5	–	2
George Washington	4	–	3	–	0	5	–	4	–	0
NC State	4	–	4	–	1	5	–	4	–	1
William & Mary	3	–	3	–	0	4	–	7	–	0
The Citadel	2	–	3	–	0	4	–	6	–	0
South Carolina	2	–	4	–	1	3	–	4	–	2
Furman	2	–	4	–	0	2	–	8	–	1
West Virginia	1	–	3	–	0	2	–	8	–	0
Davidson	1	–	5	–	0	3	–	6	–	0
Richmond	1	–	8	–	0	2	–	8	–	0
VPI	0	–	8	–	0	0	–	10	–	0
$ – Conference champion; Rankings from AP Poll

The 1950 NC State Wolfpack football team represented North Carolina State University during the 1950 college football season. The Wolfpack were led by seventh-year head coach Beattie Feathers and played their home games at Riddick Stadium in Raleigh, North Carolina. They competed as members of the Southern Conference.

== Schedule ==
Date	Time	Opponent	Site	Result	Attendance	Source
September 23		at No. 20 North Carolina	Kenan Memorial Stadium; Chapel Hill, NC (rivalry)	L 7–13	40,000	
September 30		Catawba*	Riddick Stadium; Raleigh, NC	W 7–6	7,000	
October 7		at No. 18 Clemson	Memorial Stadium; Clemson, SC (rivalry)	L 0–27	22,500	
October 14		Duke	Riddick Stadium; Raleigh, NC (rivalry)	L 0–7	17,000	
October 21		at No. 8 Maryland	Byrd Stadium; College Park, MD	W 16–13	24,502	
October 28	8:00 p.m.	VPI	Riddick Stadium; Raleigh, NC	W 34–6		
November 4		at Richmond	City Stadium; Richmond, VA	W 7–0	3,000	
November 11		Davidson	Riddick Stadium; Raleigh, NC	W 15–7	3,500	
November 18		at No. 16 Wake Forest	Groves Stadium; Wake Forest, NC (rivalry)	T 6–6	18,000	
November 25		vs. William & Mary	Foreman Field; Norfolk, VA (Oyster Bowl)	L 0–34	15,000	
*Non-conference game; Rankings from AP Poll released prior to the game; All times are in Eastern time
