= 1950 The Citadel Bulldogs football team =

American college football season

1950 The Citadel Bulldogs football
- Conference: Southern Conference
- Record: 4–6 (2–3 SoCon)
- Head coach: J. Quinn Decker (5th season)
- Home stadium: Johnson Hagood Stadium

1950 Southern Conference football standings
	Conf.					Overall
Team	W		L		T	W		L		T
No. 18 Washington and Lee $	6	–	0	–	0	8	–	3	–	0
No. 10 Clemson	3	–	0	–	1	9	–	0	–	1
VMI	5	–	1	–	0	6	–	4	–	0
Wake Forest	6	–	1	–	1	6	–	1	–	2
Maryland	4	–	1	–	1	7	–	2	–	1
Duke	5	–	2	–	0	7	–	3	–	0
North Carolina	3	–	2	–	1	3	–	5	–	2
George Washington	4	–	3	–	0	5	–	4	–	0
NC State	4	–	4	–	1	5	–	4	–	1
William & Mary	3	–	3	–	0	4	–	7	–	0
The Citadel	2	–	3	–	0	4	–	6	–	0
South Carolina	2	–	4	–	1	3	–	4	–	2
Furman	2	–	4	–	0	2	–	8	–	1
West Virginia	1	–	3	–	0	2	–	8	–	0
Davidson	1	–	5	–	0	3	–	6	–	0
Richmond	1	–	8	–	0	2	–	8	–	0
VPI	0	–	8	–	0	0	–	10	–	0
$ – Conference champion; Rankings from AP Poll

The 1950 The Citadel Bulldogs football team represented The Citadel, The Military College of South Carolina in the 1950 college football season. J. Quinn Decker served as head coach for the fifth season. The Bulldogs played as members of the Southern Conference and played home games at Johnson Hagood Stadium.

== Schedule ==
Date	Opponent	Site	Result	Attendance	Source
September 16	Parris Island Marines*	Johnson Hagood Stadium; Charleston, SC	W 56–0	7,000	
September 23	at Florida*	Florida Field; Gainesville, FL	L 3–7	25,000	
September 29	at Miami (FL)*	Burdine Stadium; Miami, FL	L 0–21	33,332	
October 7	Washington and Lee	Johnson Hagood Stadium; Charleston, SC	L 0–20	7,000	
October 14	Davidson	Johnson Hagood Stadium; Charleston, SC	W 19–12	10,000	
October 21	at Furman	Sirrine Stadium; Greenville, SC (rivalry)	L 7–21	8,000	
October 27	vs. Presbyterian*	Orangeburg Fairgrounds; Orangeburg, SC	W 7–0	7,000	
November 4	Virginia*	Johnson Hagood Stadium; Charleston, SC	L 14–24	5,500	
November 11	South Carolina	Johnson Hagood Stadium; Charleston, SC	W 19–7	10,000	
November 18	at VMI	Wilson Field; Lexington, VA (rivalry)	L 7–13		
*Non-conference game
