= 1950 Vanderbilt Commodores football team =

American college football season

1950 Vanderbilt Commodores football
- Conference: Southeastern Conference
- Record: 7–4 (3–4 SEC)
- Head coach: Bill Edwards (2nd season)
- Offensive scheme: T formation
- Captain: Russ Faulkinberry
- Home stadium: Dudley Field

1950 Southeastern Conference football standings
	Conf.					Overall
Team	W		L		T	W		L		T
No. 7 Kentucky $	5	–	1	–	0	11	–	1	–	0
No. 4 Tennessee	4	–	1	–	0	11	–	1	–	0
No. 16 Alabama	6	–	2	–	0	9	–	2	–	0
No. 20 Tulane	3	–	1	–	1	6	–	2	–	1
Georgia Tech	4	–	2	–	0	5	–	6	–	0
Georgia	3	–	2	–	1	6	–	3	–	3
Mississippi State	3	–	4	–	0	4	–	5	–	0
Vanderbilt	3	–	4	–	0	7	–	4	–	0
LSU	2	–	3	–	2	4	–	5	–	2
Florida	2	–	4	–	0	5	–	5	–	0
Ole Miss	1	–	5	–	0	5	–	5	–	0
Auburn	0	–	7	–	0	0	–	10	–	0
$ – Conference champion; Rankings from AP Poll

The 1950 Vanderbilt Commodores football team represented Vanderbilt University during the 1950 college football season. The team's head coach was Bill Edwards, who was in his second season as the Commodores' head coach.

Members of the Southeastern Conference, the Commodores played their six home games at Dudley Field in Nashville, Tennessee.

== Schedule ==
Date	Opponent	Rank	Site	Result	Attendance	Source
September 23	Middle Tennessee*		Dudley Field; Nashville, TN	W 47–0	18,000	
September 30	Auburn		Dudley Field; Nashville, TN	W 41–0	19,000	
October 7	at No. 12 Alabama		Ladd Memorial Stadium; Mobile, AL	W 27–22	32,000	
October 14	Ole Miss	No. 19	Dudley Field; Nashville, TN (rivalry)	W 20–14		
October 21	Florida^{†}	No. 13	Dudley Field; Nashville, TN	L 27–31	24,000	
October 28	at Arkansas*		War Memorial Stadium; Little Rock, AR	W 14–13		
November 4	at Chattanooga*		Chamberlain Field; Chattanooga, TN	W 34–12	10,000	
November 11	LSU		Dudley Field; Nashville, TN	L 7–33	24,000	
November 18	at Memphis State*		Crump Stadium; Memphis, TN	W 29–13	9,548	
November 25	at Tulane		Tulane Stadium; New Orleans, LA	L 6–35		
December 2	No. 4 Tennessee		Dudley Field; Nashville, TN (rivalry)	L 0–43	28,000	
*Non-conference game; ^{†}Homecoming; Rankings from AP Poll released prior to the game
