= 1950 Ole Miss Rebels football team =

American college football season

1950 Ole Miss Rebels football
- Conference: Southeastern Conference
- Record: 5–5 (1–5 SEC)
- Head coach: Johnny Vaught (4th season)
- Home stadium: Hemingway Stadium

1950 Southeastern Conference football standings
	Conf.					Overall
Team	W		L		T	W		L		T
No. 7 Kentucky $	5	–	1	–	0	11	–	1	–	0
No. 4 Tennessee	4	–	1	–	0	11	–	1	–	0
No. 16 Alabama	6	–	2	–	0	9	–	2	–	0
No. 20 Tulane	3	–	1	–	1	6	–	2	–	1
Georgia Tech	4	–	2	–	0	5	–	6	–	0
Georgia	3	–	2	–	1	6	–	3	–	3
Mississippi State	3	–	4	–	0	4	–	5	–	0
Vanderbilt	3	–	4	–	0	7	–	4	–	0
LSU	2	–	3	–	2	4	–	5	–	2
Florida	2	–	4	–	0	5	–	5	–	0
Ole Miss	1	–	5	–	0	5	–	5	–	0
Auburn	0	–	7	–	0	0	–	10	–	0
$ – Conference champion; Rankings from AP Poll

The 1950 Ole Miss Rebels football team was an American football team that represented the University of Mississippi as a member of the Southeastern Conference (SEC) during the 1950 college football season. In their fourth year under head coach Johnny Vaught, the team compiled an overall record of 5–5, with a mark of 1–5 in conference play, placing 11th in the SEC.

== Schedule ==
Date	Opponent	Site	Result	Attendance	Source
September 22	at Memphis State*	Crump Stadium; Memphis, TN (rivalry)	W 39–7		
September 30	at No. 13 Kentucky	McLean Stadium; Lexington, KY	L 0–27	32,000	
October 7	Boston College*	Hemingway Stadium; Oxford, MS	W 54–0	15,000	
October 14	at No. 19 Vanderbilt	Dudley Field; Nashville, TN (rivalry)	L 14–20		
October 21	at Tulane	Tulane Stadium; New Orleans, LA (rivalry)	L 20–27		
October 28	vs. TCU*	Crump Stadium; Memphis, TN	W 19–7		
November 4	at LSU	Tiger Stadium; Baton Rouge, LA (rivalry)	L 14–40	30,000	
November 11	Chattanooga*	Hemingway Stadium; Oxford, MS	W 20–0		
November 18	at No. 9 Tennessee	Shields–Watkins Field; Knoxville, TN (rivalry)	L 0–35		
December 2	Mississippi State	Hemingway Stadium; Oxford, MS (Egg Bowl)	W 27–20	28,000	
*Non-conference game; Rankings from AP Poll released prior to the game

== Personnel ==
1950 Ole Miss Rebels football team roster
Players
Coaches
Offense

Pos.	#	Name	Class
OT		Rex Reed Bogan
HB		Wilson Dillard
HB		Kayo Dottley
E		Ray Thornton

Defense

Pos.	#	Name	Class

Special teams

Pos.	#	Name	Class

Head coach

- Johnny Vaught

Coordinators/assistant coaches

Legend

- (C) Team captain
- (S) Suspended
- (I) Ineligible
- Injured
- Redshirt
