= Crowell Little =

American football and college basketball player

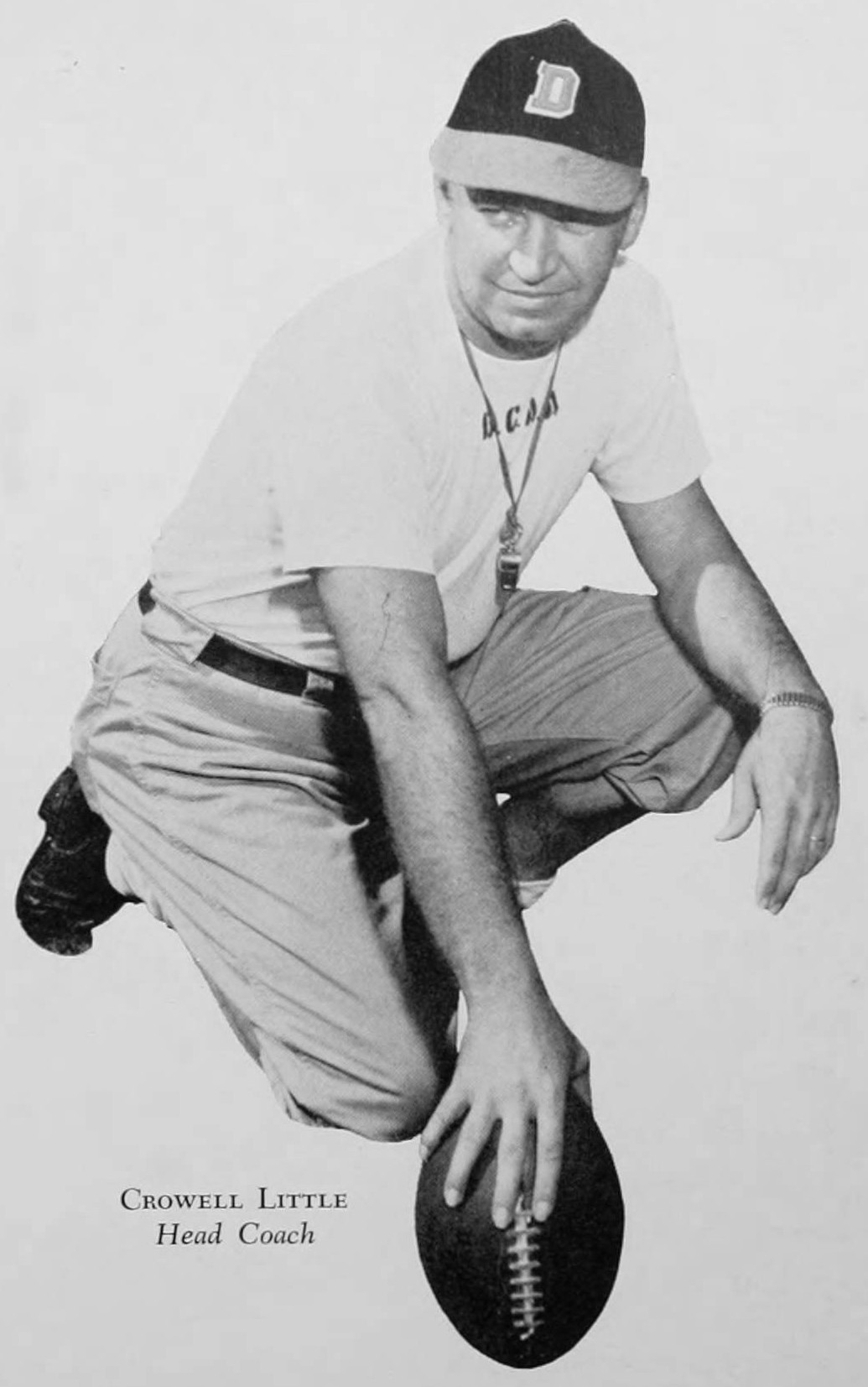
- Little, circa 1951

Biographical details
- Born: February 20, 1915; Newton, North Carolina, U.S.
- Died: December 6, 2002 (aged 87); Chapel Hill, North Carolina, U.S.

Playing career

Football
- 1936–1937: North Carolina

Basketball
- 1936–1937: North Carolina
- Position: Quarterback

Coaching career (HC unless noted)

Football
- 1939–1940: Davidson (freshmen)
- 1946–1949: North Carolina (assistant)
- 1950–1951: Davidson

Head coaching record
- Overall: 4–14

Accomplishments and honors

Awards
- First-team All-SoCon (1937)

Chester Crowell Little (February 20, 1915 – December 6, 2002) is an American former football and college basketball player. He served as the head football coach at Davidson College in Davidson, North Carolina. As a college athlete, Little was two-sport star at the University of North Carolina in Chapel Hill, North Carolina from 1936 to 1937.

== Head coaching record ==
Year	Team	Overall	Conference	Standing	Bowl/playoffs
Davidson Wildcats (Southern Conference) (1950–1951)
1950	Davidson	3–6	1–5	15th	
1951	Davidson	1–8	1–5	16th	
Davidson:		4–14	2–10		
Total:		4–14			
