= 1950 Duke Blue Devils football team =

American college football season

1950 Duke Blue Devils football
- Conference: Southern Conference
- Record: 7–3 (5–2 SoCon)
- Head coach: Wallace Wade (16th season)
- MVP: Billy Cox
- Captain: Billy Cox
- Home stadium: Duke Stadium

1950 Southern Conference football standings
	Conf.					Overall
Team	W		L		T	W		L		T
No. 18 Washington and Lee $	6	–	0	–	0	8	–	3	–	0
No. 10 Clemson	3	–	0	–	1	9	–	0	–	1
VMI	5	–	1	–	0	6	–	4	–	0
Wake Forest	6	–	1	–	1	6	–	1	–	2
Maryland	4	–	1	–	1	7	–	2	–	1
Duke	5	–	2	–	0	7	–	3	–	0
North Carolina	3	–	2	–	1	3	–	5	–	2
George Washington	4	–	3	–	0	5	–	4	–	0
NC State	4	–	4	–	1	5	–	4	–	1
William & Mary	3	–	3	–	0	4	–	7	–	0
The Citadel	2	–	3	–	0	4	–	6	–	0
South Carolina	2	–	4	–	1	3	–	4	–	2
Furman	2	–	4	–	0	2	–	8	–	1
West Virginia	1	–	3	–	0	2	–	8	–	0
Davidson	1	–	5	–	0	3	–	6	–	0
Richmond	1	–	8	–	0	2	–	8	–	0
VPI	0	–	8	–	0	0	–	10	–	0
$ – Conference champion; Rankings from AP Poll

The 1950 Duke Blue Devils football team was an American football team that represented Duke University as a member of the Southern Conference (SoCon) during the 1950 college football season. In their 16th year under head coach Wallace Wade, the Blue Devils compiled an overall record of 7–3, with a conference record of 5–2, and finished sixth in the SoCon.

== Schedule ==
Date	Opponent	Rank	Site	Result	Attendance	Source
September 23	at South Carolina	No. 16	Carolina Stadium; Columbia, SC	W 14–0	25,000	
September 30	Pittsburgh*	No. 16	Duke Stadium; Durham, NC	W 28–14	25,000	
October 7	Tennessee*	No. 14	Duke Stadium; Durham, NC	L 7–28	30,000	
October 14	at NC State		Riddick Stadium; Raleigh, NC (rivalry)	W 7–0	17,000	
October 21	at Richmond		City Stadium; Richmond, VA	W 41–0	4,000	
October 28	Maryland		Duke Stadium; Durham, NC	L 14–26	22,577	
November 4	Georgia Tech*^{†}		Duke Stadium; Durham, NC	W 30–21	30,000	
November 11	Wake Forest		Duke Stadium; Durham, NC (rivalry)	L 7–13	25,000	
November 18	vs. VPI		Bowman Gray Stadium; Winston-Salem, NC	W 47–6	6,000	
November 25	at North Carolina		Kenan Memorial Stadium; Chapel Hill, NC (Victory Bell)	W 7–0	40,000	
*Non-conference game; ^{†}Homecoming; Rankings from AP Poll released prior to the game
