= 1950 Maryland Terrapins football team =

American college football season

1950 Maryland Terrapins football
- Conference: Southern Conference
- Record: 7–2–1 (4–1–1 SoCon)
- Head coach: Jim Tatum (4th season)
- Offensive scheme: Split-T
- Captains: Ray Krouse; Jake Rowden
- Home stadium: Byrd Stadium

1950 Southern Conference football standings
	Conf.					Overall
Team	W		L		T	W		L		T
No. 18 Washington and Lee $	6	–	0	–	0	8	–	3	–	0
No. 10 Clemson	3	–	0	–	1	9	–	0	–	1
VMI	5	–	1	–	0	6	–	4	–	0
Wake Forest	6	–	1	–	1	6	–	1	–	2
Maryland	4	–	1	–	1	7	–	2	–	1
Duke	5	–	2	–	0	7	–	3	–	0
North Carolina	3	–	2	–	1	3	–	5	–	2
George Washington	4	–	3	–	0	5	–	4	–	0
NC State	4	–	4	–	1	5	–	4	–	1
William & Mary	3	–	3	–	0	4	–	7	–	0
The Citadel	2	–	3	–	0	4	–	6	–	0
South Carolina	2	–	4	–	1	3	–	4	–	2
Furman	2	–	4	–	0	2	–	8	–	1
West Virginia	1	–	3	–	0	2	–	8	–	0
Davidson	1	–	5	–	0	3	–	6	–	0
Richmond	1	–	8	–	0	2	–	8	–	0
VPI	0	–	8	–	0	0	–	10	–	0
$ – Conference champion; Rankings from AP Poll

The 1950 Maryland Terrapins football team represented the University of Maryland in 1950 college football season as a member of the Southern Conference (SoCon).

Maryland was led by fourth-year head coach Jim Tatum, who Time magazine called "the most successful major college coach in the game" during his nine-year tenure at College Park. To date, Tatum remains the winningest Maryland football coach of the modern era, with a winning percentage of 0.819. The team was led on the field by sophomore quarterback and future Heisman Trophy runner-up Jack Scarbath who made his first career start in the season-opener.

The highlight of the season was Maryland's upset victory over second-ranked Michigan State, 34–7, in what was that team's only loss of the season. Two weeks later, however, the Terrapins' bowl game hopes were ended with a homecoming defeat at the hands of NC State.

== Schedule ==
Date	Opponent	Rank	Site	Result	Attendance	Source
September 23	at Georgia*	No. 15	Sanford Stadium; Athens, GA	L 7–27	35,000	
September 30	Navy*	No. 15	Byrd Stadium; College Park, MD (rivalry)	W 35–21	43,836	
October 7	at No. 2 Michigan State*		Macklin Stadium; East Lansing, MI	W 34–7	39,376	
October 14	at Georgetown*	No. 8	Griffith Stadium; Washington, DC	W 25–14	8,869	
October 21	NC State^{†}	No. 8	Byrd Stadium; College Park, MD	L 13–16	24,502	
October 28	at Duke		Duke Stadium; Durham, NC	W 26–14	22,577	
November 4	George Washington	No. 16	Byrd Stadium; College Park, MD	W 23–7	18,272	
November 11	at North Carolina	No. 18	Kenan Memorial Stadium; Chapel Hill, NC	T 7–7	32,000	
November 18	at West Virginia		Mountaineer Field; Morgantown, WV (rivalry)	W 41–0	16,000	
December 2	VPI		Byrd Stadium; College Park, MD	W 63–7	11,773	
*Non-conference game; ^{†}Homecoming; Rankings from Coaches' Poll released prior to the game

== Rankings ==
Ranking movements Legend: ██ Increase in ranking ██ Decrease in ranking — = Not ranked
	Week										
Poll	Pre	1	2	3	4	5	6	7	8	9	Final
AP	15	15	—	8	8	—	16	18	—	—	—

== Game summaries ==
=== Georgia ===
	1	2	3	4	Total
#15 Maryland	0	7	0	0	7
Georgia	7	0	7	13	27

Georgia scored first in the opening period. In the second quarter, Maryland sophomore quarterback Jack Scarbath completed three passes in a 54-yard drive that culminated in a pitch to Bob Shemonski who ran around the right end and into the end zone.

After the game, Maryland head coach Jim Tatum said, "We weren't ready for Georgia in a game as early as September 23 ... We weren't in shape and the [92 °F (33 °C)] heat killed us." The loss, however, did not affect Maryland's poll ranking as the situation surrounding the game was generally understood.

=== Navy ===
	1	2	3	4	Total
Navy	0	0	7	14	21
#15 Maryland	7	14	0	14	35

In week 2, the Terrapins played the inaugural game at the newly completed Byrd Stadium. It was the first game against the Naval Academy in 16 years. The series had been canceled in 1936 after Maryland accused Navy of an illegal play for their go-ahead score. Maryland had agreed to fill in a vacancy in the Navy schedule left open by a Georgetown cancellation. In the first quarter, Scarbath broke away for a 21-yard touchdown run. Then, in the second quarter, Scarbath linked up with end Stan Karnash for a 44-yard touchdown. Scarbath again passed for a 59-yard score to end Pete Augsburger. At halftime, the Terrapins led 21–0. Navy responded with a touchdown of their own in the third quarter. In the final quarter, Maryland end Elmer Wingate returned an interception 34-yards for a score. Fifty-four seconds later, Maryland end Lew Weidensaul recovered a Midshipmen fumble. Ed Modzelewski capped the ensuing Terrapins' possession with a five-yard rush into the end zone.

The high-scoring game resulted in just the second-ever Maryland win in the 12th meeting of the intense in-state rivalry.

=== Michigan State ===
	1	2	3	4	Total
Maryland	6	7	0	21	34
#2 Michigan State	0	0	7	0	7

Michigan State College entered the game after beating first-ranked Michigan, 14–7, the week prior. It was the Spartans first victory over their arch-rivals in thirteen years and propelled Michigan State to the number-two spot in the AP Poll. The previous season, Maryland had traveled to Michigan State where the Spartans handed them their lone defeat, 7–14. Ed Modzelewski scored a touchdown in both the first and second quarter. Michigan State responded with a touchdown of their own in the third quarter. In the final period, Scarbath scored on a quarterback sneak. End Pete Ladygo returned an intercepted pass 35-yards for a touchdown and later Bob Shemonski made an interception for a 37-yard touchdown return.

Maryland's defense held the high-powered Michigan State offense to 140 rushing yards, 67 of which were gained on a single run by Sonny Grandelius. Michigan State completed three of 20 pass attempts. Maryland intercepted six passes and returned two for scores. After the upset victory, Maryland climbed to an AP Poll ranking of 8th in the nation. It was the only loss of the season for Michigan State, which ended the season ranked eighth in the nation.

=== Georgetown ===
	1	2	3	4	Total
#8 Maryland	7	7	4	7	25
Georgetown	7	0	0	7	14

After the upset win over number-two Michigan State, Maryland rose in the AP Poll to become the second-ranked team in the country. Georgetown entered the game as 27-point underdogs.

In the first quarter, Maryland executed an eight-play, 95-yard drive that culminated in an eight-yard touchdown rush by fullback Ed Fullerton. Georgetown tied the game at 7–7 with a fourth-down pass in the end zone. In the second quarter, Bob Shemonski scored on a six-yard end-around to end the half at 14–7. In the third quarter, Maryland recorded two safeties in quick succession: one when punter Joe Pallotta stepped outside of the end zone and the other when Bob Ward tackled Frank Mattingly for a loss. With three minutes remaining in the fourth quarter, Georgetown scored another touchdown to narrow the deficit to 18–14. Fullerton then rushed for 24 yards to advance to the Georgetown six-yard line. Scarbath then ran into the end zone for the final result of 25–14.

Despite the closeness of the contest, Maryland dominated the game statistically. The Terrapins rushed 342 yards to the Hoyas' 40. Georgetown compiled 128 yards through the air and Maryland 118. The Terrapins returned kicks and punts for a combined 225 yards, compared with the Hoyas' 66 yards on returns.

=== NC State ===
	1	2	3	4	Total
NC State	9	0	7	0	16
#8 Maryland	0	0	0	13	13

For Homecoming weekend, NC State met eighth-ranked Maryland at Byrd Stadium. In the first quarter, a Maryland fumble rolled out of the end zone for a safety, and soon after, another fumble set up a touchdown with a 13-yard rush by NC State's Ed Mooney. Maryland advanced inside the NC State five-yard line three times but was unable to score. In the third quarter, Mooney scored again to bring the score 0–16. Maryland scored on a 21-yard pass from Jack Scarbath to Bob Shemonski. With three minutes remaining, Shemonski connected with a pass to Pete Augsburger for another touchdown. Three passes to Augsburger led a 47-yard drive into Wolfpack territory. A pass in the end zone was intercepted with seconds remaining and the game ended with a final score of 13–16. The loss effectively ended the Terrapins' hopes for a bowl game bid.

The second loss dropped them out of the AP Polls for the remainder of the year.

=== Duke ===
	1	2	3	4	Total
Maryland	0	13	6	7	26
Duke	0	7	0	7	14

In the second quarter, Ed Modzelewski rushed 18 yards to set up a three-yard touchdown by Shemonski. Then Ed Modzelewski broke away for 44 yards and allowed end Joe Petruzzo to rush two yards for another score. Duke responded with a touchdown of its own before halftime. In the third quarter, Shemonski rushed 44 yards, reversing direction twice, before finding the end zone. Duke scored once more to bring it to 19–14. With six seconds remaining, Petruzzo intercepted a Blue Devils pass and returned it 46 yards for a score to clinch the game for Maryland, 26–14.

It was the seventh meeting of the series and Maryland's first victory over Duke.

=== George Washington ===
	1	2	3	4	Total
George Washington	0	7	0	0	7
#16 Maryland	7	0	7	9	23

Sophomore Bob DeStefano filled in at quarterback for the injured Scarbath. In the first quarter, DeStefano connected with Stan Karnash on a 37-yard touchdown pass. In the second quarter, quarterback Andy Davis, fourth-ranked in the nation in total yardage, led George Washington to tie the game before the half. In the third quarter, DeStefano hit Shemonski for a three-yard touchdown. In the final period, Davis led the Colonials on a 43-yard drive, but they were stopped on the Maryland 3-yard line. Petruzzo then stopped another G.W. drive when he intercepted a pass and returned it 44 yards. Ed Modzelewski rushed to the Colonials' three-yard line setting up a scoring run by Fullerton. In the final minutes, G.W.'s John Shullenbarger slipped on the wet turf in the end zone for a Maryland safety.

=== North Carolina ===
	1	2	3	4	Total
#18 Maryland	0	7	0	0	7
North Carolina	0	0	7	0	7

In a steady downpour, 18th-ranked Maryland met North Carolina for the 17th time. North Carolina, Maryland head coach Tatum's alma mater, possessed a nine-game winning streak in the series. The first quarter remained scoreless, but in the second, North Carolina fumbled a punt by Maryland's Jack Targarona. The Terrapins' Karney Scioscia recovered the ball on the Tar Heel 31-yard line. DeStefano completed a 17-yard pass to Karnash and then connected with Augsburger on the Carolina eight-yard line. In two subsequent plays, the Terps pushed to the four-yard line. DeStefano then pitched to Shemonski who ran around end and into the end zone. Maryland managed to stop two North Carolina drives on the Terrapins' 28- and eight-yard lines. Late in the third quarter, Carolina mounted a drive into Maryland territory which continued into the fourth quarter. The Terrapins' defense held twice at their own one-yard line, but the Tar Heels' Bud Wallace pushed into the end zone on third down for the score. In the final minutes, Maryland drove to the Carolina 15-yard line. With five seconds remaining, guard Bob Dean missed on a field goal attempt, which resulted in a stalemate of 7–7.

=== West Virginia ===
	1	2	3	4	Total
Maryland	7	20	7	7	41
West Virginia	0	0	0	0	0

In the first quarter, Ed Modzelewski caught a 28-yard pass and then rushed twice from the ten-yard line for the first score of the game. In the second quarter, Modzelewski scored again on a five-yard rush. Fullerton scored on a run from the six-inch line followed by a nine-yard end around by Shemonski. In the second half, Shemonski scored twice more. Maryland capitalized heavily on turnovers, with three interceptions were returned for touchdowns. Two fumbles and a bad punt set up further scores. The 14th-ranked West Virginia passing attack was held to 79 yards. Maryland punter Targarona consistently pinned the Mountaineers deep in their own territory and recorded punts downed on the one-, eight-, five-, and eight-yard lines. During the first half, West Virginia did not convert for a first down or advance the ball beyond their own 36-yard line. In what was the ninth game of the series, Maryland recorded its first victory over West Virginia at Morgantown.

=== VPI ===
	1	2	3	4	Total
VPI	0	0	0	7	7
Maryland	27	18	18	0	63

In the first quarter, Shemonski scored four touchdowns on 22- and 26-yard rushes, an 81-yard punt return, and a 4-yard rush. In the second quarter, Karnash ran an end around into the end zone for a score before Shemonski scored again. Center Jack Rowden returned an interception 45-yards for a touchdown. In the third quarter, Johnny Idzik scored on a 10-yard rush. DeStefano touchdown on a keeper. Tackle Chet Gierula ran an end around nine yards for a final Maryland score. In the fourth quarter, VPI scored its only points of the game for a final result of 63–7.

In all, 22 Maryland players made carries and guard Bob Ward made two for 46 yards. Shemonski recorded five touchdowns and became the leading scorer in the Southern Conference with a season total of 97 points.

== Personnel ==
=== Players ===
The Maryland roster for the 1950 season consisted of the following players:

- John Alderton
- Frank Armsworthy
- Pete Augsburger
- Ed Barrett
- Dick Belins
- Ted Betz
- Walt Bleri
- Ed Bolton
- Dave Christianson
- Dave Cianelli
- Lloyd Colteryahn
- Tom Cosgrove
- Lynn Davis
- Bob Dean
- Bob DeStefano
- Bill Dovell
- Ed Fincke
- Hank Fox
- Ed Fullerton
- Chick Fry
- Rudy Gayzur
- Chester Gierula
- John Guender
- Art Hurd
- John Idzik
- Stan Jones
- Stan Karnash
- Joe Katona
- Jeff Keith
- Ed Kensler
- Marvin Kramer
- Ray Krouse
- Joe Kuchta
- Pete Ladygo
- Anthony Lamana
- Bill Maletzky
- Roy Martine
- Tom McHugh
- Dick Modzelewski
- Ed Modzelewski
- Bob Morgan
- Joe Moss
- Joe Petruzzo
- Ed Pobiak
- Frank Navarro
- Paul Nestor
- Eugene Pycha
- Bob Ricci
- Jake Rowden
- Bill Ruehl
- Jack Scarbath
- Karney Scioscia
- Bob Shemonski
- Dan Staffieri
- Ray Stankus
- Jack Targarona
- John Troha
- Bob Ward
- Lou Weidensaul
- Elmer Wingate

== Awards ==
Bob Ward was named a first-team All-American by the Associated Press and a second-team All-American by United Press. Ed Modzelewski was named an honorable mention All-American. Pete Augsburger was named an honorable mention All-American by the United Press. Ward and Elmer Wingate were named All-Southern Conference.

== See also ==
- Maryland Terrapins football under Jim Tatum (1947–1955)
