= 1950 VPI Gobblers football team =

American college football season

1950 VPI Gobblers football
- Conference: Southern Conference
- Record: 0–10 (0–8 SoCon)
- Head coach: Bob McNeish (3rd season)
- Home stadium: Miles Stadium

1950 Southern Conference football standings
	Conf.					Overall
Team	W		L		T	W		L		T
No. 18 Washington and Lee $	6	–	0	–	0	8	–	3	–	0
No. 10 Clemson	3	–	0	–	1	9	–	0	–	1
VMI	5	–	1	–	0	6	–	4	–	0
Wake Forest	6	–	1	–	1	6	–	1	–	2
Maryland	4	–	1	–	1	7	–	2	–	1
Duke	5	–	2	–	0	7	–	3	–	0
North Carolina	3	–	2	–	1	3	–	5	–	2
George Washington	4	–	3	–	0	5	–	4	–	0
NC State	4	–	4	–	1	5	–	4	–	1
William & Mary	3	–	3	–	0	4	–	7	–	0
The Citadel	2	–	3	–	0	4	–	6	–	0
South Carolina	2	–	4	–	1	3	–	4	–	2
Furman	2	–	4	–	0	2	–	8	–	1
West Virginia	1	–	3	–	0	2	–	8	–	0
Davidson	1	–	5	–	0	3	–	6	–	0
Richmond	1	–	8	–	0	2	–	8	–	0
VPI	0	–	8	–	0	0	–	10	–	0
$ – Conference champion; Rankings from AP Poll

The 1950 VPI Gobblers football team represented Virginia Polytechnic Institute in the 1950 college football season. The team was led by their head coach Bob McNeish and finished with a record of zero wins and ten losses (0–10).

== Schedule ==
Date	Time	Opponent	Site	Result	Attendance	Source
September 30		Quantico Marines*	Miles Stadium; Blacksburg, VA	L 21–61	9,000	
October 7		vs. Virginia*	Victory Stadium; Roanoke, VA (rivalry)	L 6–45	12,000	
October 13		at George Washington	Griffith Stadium; Washington, DC	L 7–42	9,283	
October 21		William & Mary^{†}	Miles Stadium; Blacksburg, VA	L 0–54	11,000	
October 28	8:00 p.m.	at NC State	Riddick Stadium; Raleigh, NC	L 6–34		
November 4		at Washington and Lee	Wilson Field; Lexington, VA	L 7–25	3,000	
November 11		Richmond	Miles Stadium; Blacksburg, VA	L 12–32	7,000	
November 18		vs. Duke	Bowman Gray Stadium; Winston-Salem, NC	L 6–47	6,000	
November 23		vs. VMI	Victory Stadium; Roanoke, VA (rivalry)	L 0–27	25,000	
December 2		at Maryland	Byrd Stadium; College Park, MD	L 7–63	11,773	
*Non-conference game; ^{†}Homecoming; All times are in Eastern time

== Roster ==
The following players were members of the 1950 football team according to the roster published in the 1951 edition of The Bugle, the Virginia Tech yearbook.

VPI 1950 roster
Dean Gerrard Boyle; Gene Burnette; John Campbell; Ronald Herman Casto; Joseph Litton Church; Howard Cowan; Bruce Mills "Bud" Fisher; Thomas Malcolm Fisher; Eustace Frederick; Everett Grant Germain; Richard "Bob" Gilley; Richard D. Goodman; Lawrence Shultz Hansrote; Frank Hargrove; Charles Donald Herb	Dick Hiler; Francis Hobbs; Andy Michael Hodgson; W. J. "Pat" Hoggard; Richard Earle Huff; Shakeep Kassem; Eugene "Bunky" Keeton; Charles Edward Kernan; Joseph Edward Kosco; Edward Kraynak; Richard Kuhn; Frank Ronald Kwiatkowski; Timothy Lawler; Casimir Jerome "Ki" Luczak; Ronald Garland Miller; Minor	Murie; Roger Rowland Neel; Dick Newcomb; Madison "Buzz" Nutter; Beverley Parrish; Douglas Cooper Petty; Jay B. Ratliff; Charles Ronald Raugh; Roy Carrington Robinette; Richard Phillips Rosenbaum; Michael Rusinko; William Stark; John Robert Stortz; Robert James Wachter; Norman Chad White; Sterling Lagrand Wingo
