= 1950 Georgia Bulldogs football team =

American college football season

1950 Georgia Bulldogs football

Presidential Cup Bowl, L 20–40 vs. Texas A&M
- Conference: Southeastern Conference
- Record: 6–3–3 (3–2–1 SEC)
- Head coach: Wally Butts (12th season)
- Home stadium: Sanford Stadium

1950 Southeastern Conference football standings
	Conf.					Overall
Team	W		L		T	W		L		T
No. 7 Kentucky $	5	–	1	–	0	11	–	1	–	0
No. 4 Tennessee	4	–	1	–	0	11	–	1	–	0
No. 16 Alabama	6	–	2	–	0	9	–	2	–	0
No. 20 Tulane	3	–	1	–	1	6	–	2	–	1
Georgia Tech	4	–	2	–	0	5	–	6	–	0
Georgia	3	–	2	–	1	6	–	3	–	3
Mississippi State	3	–	4	–	0	4	–	5	–	0
Vanderbilt	3	–	4	–	0	7	–	4	–	0
LSU	2	–	3	–	2	4	–	5	–	2
Florida	2	–	4	–	0	5	–	5	–	0
Ole Miss	1	–	5	–	0	5	–	5	–	0
Auburn	0	–	7	–	0	0	–	10	–	0
$ – Conference champion; Rankings from AP Poll

The 1950 Georgia Bulldogs football team was an American football team that represented the University of Georgia as a member of the Southeastern Conference (SEC) during the 1950 college football season. In their 12th year under head coach Wally Butts, the team compiled an overall record of 6–3–3, with a mark of 3–2–1 in conference play, placing sixth in the SEC.

== Schedule ==
Date	Opponent	Site	Result	Attendance	Source
September 23	No. 15 Maryland*	Sanford Stadium; Athens, GA	W 27–7	35,000	
September 29	at Saint Mary's*	Kezar Stadium; San Francisco, CA	T 7–7	7,220	
October 7	No. 11 North Carolina*	Sanford Stadium; Athens, GA	T 0–0	40,000	
October 14	No. 15 Mississippi State^{†}	Sanford Stadium; Athens, GA	W 27–0	20,000	
October 21	at LSU	Tiger Stadium; Baton Rouge, LA	T 13–13	25,000	
October 27	at Boston College*	Braves Field; Boston, MA	W 19–7	9,243	
November 4	at Alabama	Legion Field; Birmingham, AL (rivalry)	L 7–14	39,000	
November 11	vs. Florida	Gator Bowl Stadium; Jacksonville, FL (rivalry)	W 6–0	36,132	
November 18	vs. Auburn	Memorial Stadium; Columbus, GA (rivalry)	W 12–10		
November 25	Furman*	Sanford Stadium; Athens, GA	W 40–0	2,000	
December 2	Georgia Tech	Sanford Stadium; Athens, GA (rivalry)	L 0–7	50,000	
December 9	vs. Texas A&M*	Byrd Stadium; College Park, MD (Presidential Cup Bowl)	L 20–40	12,245	
*Non-conference game; ^{†}Homecoming; Rankings from AP Poll released prior to the game
