= 1950 Florida Gators football team =

American college football season

1950 Florida Gators football
- The 1950 Gators practice under the lights before the first night game at Florida Field.
- Conference: Southeastern Conference
- Record: 5–5 (2–4 SEC)
- Head coach: Bob Woodruff (1st season)
- Captain: Angus Williams
- Home stadium: Florida Field

1950 Southeastern Conference football standings
	Conf.					Overall
Team	W		L		T	W		L		T
No. 7 Kentucky $	5	–	1	–	0	11	–	1	–	0
No. 4 Tennessee	4	–	1	–	0	11	–	1	–	0
No. 16 Alabama	6	–	2	–	0	9	–	2	–	0
No. 20 Tulane	3	–	1	–	1	6	–	2	–	1
Georgia Tech	4	–	2	–	0	5	–	6	–	0
Georgia	3	–	2	–	1	6	–	3	–	3
Mississippi State	3	–	4	–	0	4	–	5	–	0
Vanderbilt	3	–	4	–	0	7	–	4	–	0
LSU	2	–	3	–	2	4	–	5	–	2
Florida	2	–	4	–	0	5	–	5	–	0
Ole Miss	1	–	5	–	0	5	–	5	–	0
Auburn	0	–	7	–	0	0	–	10	–	0
$ – Conference champion; Rankings from AP Poll

The 1950 Florida Gators football team represented the University of Florida during the 1950 college football season. The season was Bob Woodruff's first of ten as the new head coach of the Florida Gators football team. Woodruff was a former college football player and assistant for coach Robert Neyland's Tennessee Volunteers, who made his name as an up-and-coming young head coach leading the Baylor Bears for three seasons in the late 1940s. Like Neyland, Woodruff emphasized stout defense, the kicking game and a ball control offense. In Woodruff's first season of 1950, the Gators offense, led by quarterback Haywood Sullivan and offensive coordinator Frank Broyles, posted record numbers. Sullivan was the first sophomore in SEC history to throw for more than 1,000 yards in a season. He set nine school records. (Note: These included average (50.3%), yardage (1,170), and average for a single game (7 for 7 against Kentucky).) The highlights of the season included two Southeastern Conference (SEC) victories over the Auburn Tigers (27–7) and the No. 13-ranked Vanderbilt Commodores (31–27)—the first season since 1940 in which the Gators won two or more SEC games. The Gators' No. 20 ranking after the Vanderbilt game marked their first-ever appearance in the top twenty of the weekly Associated Press Poll. Woodruff's 1950 Florida Gators finished 5–5 overall and 2–4 in the SEC, placing tenth among twelve conference teams.

Also of note, lights were installed at Florida Field during the summer of 1950, and the Gators opened the season with their first home night game, a 7–3 win over The Citadel.

== Schedule ==
Date	Opponent	Rank	Site	Result	Attendance	Source
September 23	The Citadel*		Florida Field; Gainesville, FL	W 7–3	25,000	
September 30	Duquesne*		Florida Field; Gainesville, FL	W 27–14	18,500	
October 7	at Georgia Tech		Grant Field; Atlanta, GA	L 13–16	21,000	
October 14	Auburn^{†}		Florida Field; Gainesville, FL (rivalry)	W 27–7	30,000	
October 21	at No. 13 Vanderbilt		Dudley Field; Nashville, TN	W 31–27	24,000	
October 28	Furman*	No. 20	Florida Field; Gainesville, FL	W 19–7		
November 4	at No. 5 Kentucky	No. 17	McLean Stadium; Lexington, KY (rivalry)	L 6–40	33,000	
November 11	vs. Georgia		Gator Bowl Stadium; Jacksonville, FL (rivalry)	L 0–6	36,132	
November 18	No. 17 Miami (FL)*		Florida Field; Gainesville, FL (rivalry)	L 14–20	40,000	
November 25	vs. No. 17 Alabama		Gator Bowl Stadium; Jacksonville, FL (rivalry)	L 13–41	16,000	
*Non-conference game; ^{†}Homecoming; Rankings from AP Poll released prior to the game
