= 1950 West Virginia Mountaineers football team =

American college football season

1950 West Virginia Mountaineers football
- Conference: Southern Conference
- Record: 2–8 (1–3 SoCon)
- Head coach: Art Lewis (1st season)
- Captain: Lawrence Ciccarelli
- Home stadium: Mountaineer Field

1950 Southern Conference football standings
| | Conf. | | | | | Overall |
| Team | W | | L | | T | W | | L | | T |
|---|---|---|---|---|---|---|---|---|---|---|
| No. 18 Washington and Lee $ | 6 | – | 0 | – | 0 | 8 | – | 3 | – | 0 |
| No. 10 Clemson | 3 | – | 0 | – | 1 | 9 | – | 0 | – | 1 |
| VMI | 5 | – | 1 | – | 0 | 6 | – | 4 | – | 0 |
| Wake Forest | 6 | – | 1 | – | 1 | 6 | – | 1 | – | 2 |
| Maryland | 4 | – | 1 | – | 1 | 7 | – | 2 | – | 1 |
| Duke | 5 | – | 2 | – | 0 | 7 | – | 3 | – | 0 |
| North Carolina | 3 | – | 2 | – | 1 | 3 | – | 5 | – | 2 |
| George Washington | 4 | – | 3 | – | 0 | 5 | – | 4 | – | 0 |
| NC State | 4 | – | 4 | – | 1 | 5 | – | 4 | – | 1 |
| William & Mary | 3 | – | 3 | – | 0 | 4 | – | 7 | – | 0 |
| The Citadel | 2 | – | 3 | – | 0 | 4 | – | 6 | – | 0 |
| South Carolina | 2 | – | 4 | – | 1 | 3 | – | 4 | – | 2 |
| Furman | 2 | – | 4 | – | 0 | 2 | – | 8 | – | 1 |
| West Virginia | 1 | – | 3 | – | 0 | 2 | – | 8 | – | 0 |
| Davidson | 1 | – | 5 | – | 0 | 3 | – | 6 | – | 0 |
| Richmond | 1 | – | 8 | – | 0 | 2 | – | 8 | – | 0 |
| VPI | 0 | – | 8 | – | 0 | 0 | – | 10 | – | 0 |
$ – Conference champion; Rankings from AP Poll

The 1950 West Virginia Mountaineers football team was an American football team that represented West Virginia University as a nmember of the Southern Conference (SoCon) during the 1950 college football season. In its first season under head coach Art Lewis, the team compiled a 2–8 record (1–3 against SoCon opponents), finished in 14th place in the conference, and was outscored by a combined total of 259 to 163. The team played its home games at Mountaineer Field in Morgantown, West Virginia. Lawrence Ciccarelli was the team captain.

== Schedule ==
| Date | Opponent | Site | Result | Attendance | Source |
|---|---|---|---|---|---|
| September 23 | Western Reserve* | Mountaineer Field; Morgantown, WV | W 38–13 | | |
| September 30 | vs. Washington and Lee | Municipal Stadium; Lynchburg, VA | L 7–26 | 8,000 | |
| October 6 | at George Washington | Griffith Stadium; Washington, DC | L 14–21 | 8,007 | |
| October 14 | Richmond | Mountaineer Field; Morgantown, WV | W 46–7 | 6,000 | |
| October 21 | Fordham* | Mountaineer Field; Morgantown, WV | L 23–27 | 18,000 | |
| October 28 | Virginia*^{†} | Mountaineer Field; Morgantown, WV | L 21–28 | 22,000 | |
| November 4 | at Pittsburgh* | Pitt Stadium; Pittsburgh, PA (rivalry) | L 7–21 | 6,125 | |
| November 11 | at Penn State* | New Beaver Field; State College, PA (rivalry) | L 0–27 | 16,338 | |
| November 18 | Maryland | Mountaineer Field; Morgantown, WV (rivalry) | L 0–41 | 16,000 | |
| November 25 | at Texas Western* | Kidd Field; El Paso, TX | L 7–48 | 9,000 | |
*Non-conference game; ^{†}Homecoming
