= 1937 All-Southern Conference football team =

The 1937 All-Southern Conference football team consists of American football players chosen by the Associated Press (AP) and United Press (UP) for the All-Southern Conference football team for the 1937 college football season.

== All-Southern Conference selections ==
=== Backs ===
- Paul Shu, VMI (AP-1; UP-1)
- Elmore Hackney, Duke (AP-1; UP-1)
- Jim Meade, Maryland (AP-1; UP-2)
- Crowell Little, North Carolina (AP-1; UP-2)
- Eric Tipton, Duke (AP-2; UP-1)
- Tom Burnette, North Carolina (AP-2; UP-1)
- Eddie Berlinski, NC State (AP-2; UP-2)
- Don Willis, Clemson (AP-2; UP-2)
- Teeny Lafferty, Davidson (AP-3)
- Charlie Weidinger, Maryland (AP-3)

=== Ends ===
- Andy Bershak, North Carolina (AP-1; UP-1)
- Herb Hudgins, Duke (AP-1; UP-2)
- Jess Tatum, NC State (AP-3; UP-1)
- Bailey Williams, Davidson (AP-2; UP-2)
- Smith, Maryland (AP-2)
- Francis King, Citadel (AP-3)

=== Tackles ===
- Henry Barton, North Carolina (AP-1; UP-1)
- Joe Brunansky, Duke (AP-1; UP-1)
- Fred Wyse, Clemson (AP-2; UP-2)
- Richard Strickler, VMI (AP-2)
- Al Fielder, VMI (AP-3; UP-2)
- Steve Maronic, North Carolina (AP-3)

=== Guards ===
- Elmer Wrenn, North Carolina (AP-1; UP-1)
- Woody Lipscomb, Duke (AP-1; UP-1)
- Jack Shivers, Furman (AP-2; UP-2)
- Jim Woodson, North Carolina (AP-2)
- Red Echols, VMI (AP-3; UP-2)
- Mike Surgent, Maryland (AP-3)

=== Centers ===
- Charlie Woods, Clemson (AP-1; UP-1)
- Dan Hill, Duke (AP-2; UP-2)
- Andy Sabados, Citadel (AP-3)

== Key ==
AP = Associated Press

UP = United Press

== See also ==
- 1937 College Football All-America Team
