= 1950 South Carolina Gamecocks football team =

American college football season

1950 South Carolina Gamecocks football
- Conference: Southern Conference
- Record: 3–4–2 (2–4–1 SoCon)
- Head coach: Rex Enright (10th season)
- Captain: Dave Sparks
- Home stadium: Carolina Municipal Stadium

1950 Southern Conference football standings
	Conf.					Overall
Team	W		L		T	W		L		T
No. 18 Washington and Lee $	6	–	0	–	0	8	–	3	–	0
No. 10 Clemson	3	–	0	–	1	9	–	0	–	1
VMI	5	–	1	–	0	6	–	4	–	0
Wake Forest	6	–	1	–	1	6	–	1	–	2
Maryland	4	–	1	–	1	7	–	2	–	1
Duke	5	–	2	–	0	7	–	3	–	0
North Carolina	3	–	2	–	1	3	–	5	–	2
George Washington	4	–	3	–	0	5	–	4	–	0
NC State	4	–	4	–	1	5	–	4	–	1
William & Mary	3	–	3	–	0	4	–	7	–	0
The Citadel	2	–	3	–	0	4	–	6	–	0
South Carolina	2	–	4	–	1	3	–	4	–	2
Furman	2	–	4	–	0	2	–	8	–	1
West Virginia	1	–	3	–	0	2	–	8	–	0
Davidson	1	–	5	–	0	3	–	6	–	0
Richmond	1	–	8	–	0	2	–	8	–	0
VPI	0	–	8	–	0	0	–	10	–	0
$ – Conference champion; Rankings from AP Poll

The 1950 South Carolina Gamecocks football team was an American football team that represented the University of South Carolina as a member of the Southern Conference (SoCon) during the 1950 college football season. In their 10th season under head coach Rex Enright, the Gamecocks compiled an overall record of 3–4–2 with a mark of 2–4–1 in conference play, placing 12th season in the SoCon.

== Schedule ==
Date	Opponent	Site	Result	Attendance	Source
September 23	No. 16 Duke	Carolina Stadium; Columbia, SC	L 0–14	25,000	
September 30	at Georgia Tech*	Grant Field; Atlanta, GA	W 7–0	25,000	
October 6	at Furman	Sirrine Stadium; Greenville, SC	W 21–6		
October 19	No. 12 Clemson	Carolina Stadium; Columbia, SC (rivalry)	T 14–14	35,000	
October 26	at George Washington	Griffith Stadium; Washington, DC	W 34–20	13,400	
November 3	Marquette*	Carolina Stadium; Columbia, SC	T 13–13	14,000	
November 11	at The Citadel	Johnson Hagood Stadium; Charleston, SC	L 7–19	10,000	
November 18	North Carolina	Carolina Stadium; Columbia, SC (rivalry)	L 7–14	25,000	
November 25	Wake Forest	Carolina Stadium; Columbia, SC	L 7–14	14,000	
*Non-conference game; Rankings from AP Poll released prior to the game
