= 1950 George Washington Colonials football team =

American college football season

1950 George Washington Colonials football
- Conference: Southern Conference
- Record: 5–4 (4–3 SoCon)
- Head coach: Bo Rowland (3rd season)
- Home stadium: Griffith Stadium

1950 Southern Conference football standings
	Conf.					Overall
Team	W		L		T	W		L		T
No. 18 Washington and Lee $	6	–	0	–	0	8	–	3	–	0
No. 10 Clemson	3	–	0	–	1	9	–	0	–	1
VMI	5	–	1	–	0	6	–	4	–	0
Wake Forest	6	–	1	–	1	6	–	1	–	2
Maryland	4	–	1	–	1	7	–	2	–	1
Duke	5	–	2	–	0	7	–	3	–	0
North Carolina	3	–	2	–	1	3	–	5	–	2
George Washington	4	–	3	–	0	5	–	4	–	0
NC State	4	–	4	–	1	5	–	4	–	1
William & Mary	3	–	3	–	0	4	–	7	–	0
The Citadel	2	–	3	–	0	4	–	6	–	0
South Carolina	2	–	4	–	1	3	–	4	–	2
Furman	2	–	4	–	0	2	–	8	–	1
West Virginia	1	–	3	–	0	2	–	8	–	0
Davidson	1	–	5	–	0	3	–	6	–	0
Richmond	1	–	8	–	0	2	–	8	–	0
VPI	0	–	8	–	0	0	–	10	–	0
$ – Conference champion; Rankings from AP Poll

The 1950 George Washington Colonials football team was an American football team that represented George Washington University as part of the Southern Conference during the 1950 college football season. In their third season under head coach Bo Rowland, the team compiled a 5–4 record (4–3 in the SoCon).

== Schedule ==
Date	Opponent	Site	Result	Attendance	Source
September 23	at Virginia*	Scott Stadium; Charlottesville, VA	L 0–19	20,000	
September 29	VMI	George Washington HS Stadium; Alexandria, VA	W 15–12	15,000	
October 6	West Virginia	Griffith Stadium; Washington, DC	W 21–14	8,007	
October 13	VPI	Griffith Stadium; Washington, DC	W 42–7	9,283	
October 21	at No. 19 Wake Forest	Groves Stadium; Wake Forest, NC	L 0–13	10,000	
October 26	South Carolina	Griffith Stadium; Washington, DC	L 20–34	13,400	
November 4	at No. 16 Maryland	Byrd Stadium; College Park, MD	L 7–23	18,272	
November 11	at Furman	Sirrine Stadium; Greenville, SC	W 34–7	3,000	
November 25	Georgetown*	Griffith Stadium; Washington, DC	W 7–6	2,000	
*Non-conference game; Rankings from AP Poll released prior to the game
