= Angus Williams (American football) =

American football player (1927–2019)

- Born: August 25, 1927; Tampa, Florida, U.S.
- Died: June 13, 2019 (aged 91); Tampa, Florida, U.S.
- Occupation: Insurance executive
- Football career

No. 79
- Position: Quarterback

Personal information
- Listed weight: 165 lb (75 kg)

Career information
- High school: Hillsborough
- College: Florida (1945, 1948–1950)

Angus Williams (August 25, 1927 - June 13, 2019) was an American college football player and well-known insurance executive of Tampa, Florida. One source calls him "star of the 1945 Gators". After a two-year stint in the army during World War II, he returned to the Gators in 1948. He spent most of the 1948 season as the backup to Doug Belden but started the Furman game on October 29 after Belden suffered an injury. However, Williams suffered a season-ending knee injury against Furman. He became the full-time starter in 1949. The first touchdown in the victory over Georgia in 1949 was a 37-yard pass from Williams to Don Brown followed by a 21-yard run from Chuck Hunsinger. He returned a punt for the touchdown in the 7–6 loss to Miami in 1949. Williams was captain of the 1950 team. He is a member of Hillsborough High's athletic hall of fame.
