= Eddie Talboom =

American football player and coach (1921–1998)

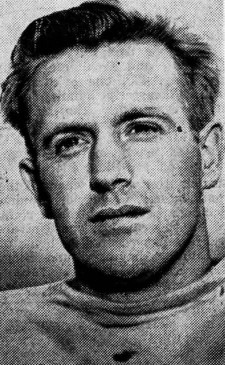

Biographical details
- Born: May 5, 1921; Delphos, Ohio, U.S.
- Died: June 6, 1998 (aged 77); Dunedin, Florida, U.S.

Playing career

Football
- 1948–1950: Wyoming
- Position: Halfback

Coaching career (HC unless noted)

Football
- 1951: Evanston HS (WY)
- 1952: St. Peter and Paul HS (MI)
- 1953–1954: Tulsa (backfield)

Basketball
- 1951–1952: Evanston HS (WY) (assistant)

Golf
- 1951–1952: Tulsa

Accomplishments and honors

Awards
- First-team All-American (1950)
- College Football Hall of Fame; Inducted in 2000 (profile)

Eddie Talboom (May 15, 1921 – June 6, 1998) was an American college football player and high school football coach. He was an All-American football player (1952) from the University of Wyoming, the first in school history.

== Football career ==
Talboom began his career at Notre Dame, but moved to the University of Wyoming after serving in World War II. It was there that Talboom achieved the Cowboys' rushing touchdown record of 34. His total of 10.8 average points per game places Talboom fifth in NCAA history.

== Awards and distinctions ==
Talboom won the Gator Bowl MVP award in 1951 and was posthumously elected to the College Football Hall of Fame in 2000.

== Coaching career ==
Talboom began his coaching career in 1951, when he was hired as the head football coach and assistant basketball coach at Evanston High School in Evanston, Wyoming.

== Death ==
Talboom died of cancer, on June 6, 1998, at his home in Dunedin, Florida.
