= Paul Lea =

American football player and physician (1929–2009)

No. 72, 7
- Positions: Defensive tackle, tackle

Personal information
- Born: February 19, 1929; Breckenridge, Texas, U.S.
- Died: May 19, 2009 (aged 80); Raton, New Mexico, U.S.
- Listed height: 6 ft 2 in (1.88 m)
- Listed weight: 240 lb (109 kg)

Career information
- College: Tulane
- NFL draft: 1951: 7th round, 84th overall pick

Career history
- Pittsburgh Steelers (1951); Calgary Stampeders (1952)
- Stats at Pro Football Reference

Paul Lea (February 19, 1929 - May 19, 2009) was an American physician and professional football player.

Lea played college football at Tulane University, where he was an offensive and defensive tackle. He was a first-team all-Southeastern Conference selection from 1948 to 1950, and was named to the 1948 College Football All-America Team as a sophomore.

Lea was selected 84th overall by the Chicago Bears in the seventh round of the 1951 NFL draft. The Bears traded him to the Pittsburgh Steelers, for whom he appeared in nine games in the 1951 season. He also played for the Calgary Stampeders of the Canadian Football League (CFL).

After his football career, Lea returned to New Orleans and graduated from Tulane Medical School. He became an anesthesiologist and was director of anesthesia at Methodist Hospital in eastern New Orleans for 30 years. After Hurricane Katrina destroyed his New Orleans home in 2005, he moved to Gunnison, Colorado. He died on May 19, 2009, while traveling to Gunnison.
