= Wilbur Jamerson =

American football player and coach (1929–1994)

Biographical details
- Born: May 27, 1929
- Died: December 9, 1994 (aged 65)

Playing career
- 1947–1950: Kentucky
- Position: Running back

Coaching career (HC unless noted)
- 1953–1955: Morehead State

Head coaching record
- Overall: 0–26

Wilbur R. "Shorty" Jamerson (May 27, 1929 – December 9, 1994) was an American football player and coach. He served as the head football coach at Morehead State College—now known as Morehead State University—in Morehead, Kentucky, from 1953 to 1955.

== Playing career ==
Jamerson was a running back for legendary coach Bear Bryant at the University of Kentucky, lettering four times between 1947 and 1950. He scored two touchdown in the 1951 Sugar Bowl to beat the Oklahoma Sooners, 13–7, and end their 31-game winning streak.

== Coaching career ==
He served as the head football coach at Morehead State University from 1953 to 1955.

== Later life and death ==
After retiring from collegiate coaching, he served a school administrator, most notably at Wheelwright High School. His former coach, Bear Bryant, said of him, "Jamerson is the best ball carrier I've had in the past five years. Had he not been injured in the early part of the season, he would have been All-American. Although he is a good football player, I'm prouder of him for his other activities. He is one of the finest leaders any team could have."

Shorty and his wife, Virginia (Buddy), spent their lives in education, improving the lives of kids who came through the school system in Wheelwright, Kentucky. Buddy was the principal of the elementary school and Shorty was principal of the high school. In addition to being the principal, he was the bus driver, football coach.

He died in 1994 at the age of 65.

== Head coaching record ==
Year	Team	Overall	Conference	Standing	Bowl/playoffs
Morehead State Eagles (Ohio Valley Conference) (1953–1955)
1953	Morehead State	0–8	0–5	6th	
1954	Morehead State	0–9	0–5	6th	
1955	Morehead State	0–9	0–5	6th	
Morehead State:		0–26	0–15		
Total:		0–26			
