= 1951 Pittsburgh Panthers football team =

American college football season

1951 Pittsburgh Panthers football
- Conference: Independent
- Record: 3–7
- Head coach: Tom Hamilton (1st season)
- Home stadium: Pitt Stadium

1951 Eastern college football independents records
	Conf.			Overall
Team	W	L	T	W		L		T
Bucknell		–		9	–	0	–	0
No. 6 Princeton		–		9	–	0	–	0
Susquehanna		–		6	–	0	–	0
Trenton State		–		6	–	0	–	0
Northeastern		–		6	–	0	–	1
No. 19 Holy Cross		–		8	–	2	–	0
Carnegie Tech		–		6	–	2	–	0
Hofstra		–		6	–	2	–	1
Cornell		–		6	–	3	–	0
No. 16 Boston University		–		6	–	4	–	0
Temple		–		6	–	4	–	0
Columbia		–		5	–	3	–	0
Villanova		–		5	–	3	–	0
Fordham		–		5	–	4	–	0
Franklin & Marshall		–		5	–	4	–	0
Penn		–		5	–	4	–	0
Penn State		–		5	–	4	–	0
Syracuse		–		5	–	4	–	0
Buffalo		–		4	–	4	–	0
Colgate		–		4	–	5	–	0
Dartmouth		–		4	–	5	–	0
Drexel		–		3	–	4	–	0
Harvard		–		3	–	5	–	1
Boston College		–		3	–	6	–	0
Yale		–		2	–	5	–	2
Pittsburgh		–		3	–	7	–	0
Geneva		–		2	–	5	–	0
Army		–		2	–	7	–	0
Brown		–		2	–	7	–	0
NYU		–		1	–	7	–	0
Tufts		–		0	–	7	–	2
Rankings from AP Poll

The 1951 Pittsburgh Panthers football team represented the University of Pittsburgh as an independent during the 1951 college football season. The team compiled a 3–7 record under head coach Tom Hamilton. The team was ranked at No. 58 in the 1951 Litkenhous Ratings.

== Schedule ==
Date	Opponent	Site	Result	Attendance	Source
September 29	Duke	Pitt Stadium; Pittsburgh, PA	L 14–19	20,066	
October 6	at Indiana	Memorial Stadium; Bloomington, IN	L 6–13	28,000	
October 13	at Iowa	Iowa Stadium; Iowa City, IA	L 17–34	35,123	
October 20	Notre Dame	Pitt Stadium; Pittsburgh, PA (rivalry)	L 0–33	60,127	
October 27	at No. 2 Michigan State	Macklin Stadium; East Lansing, MI	L 26–53	42,163	
November 3	at Rice	Rice Stadium; Houston, TX	L 13–21	26,000	
November 10	No. 20 Ohio State	Pitt Stadium; Pittsburgh, PA	L 14–16	34,747	
November 17	West Virginia	Pitt Stadium; Pittsburgh, PA (Backyard Brawl)	W 32–12	9,864	
November 24	Penn State	Pitt Stadium; Pittsburgh, PA (rivalry)	W 13–7	20,145–22,771	
December 7	at Miami (FL)	Burdine Stadium; Miami, FL	W 21–7	39,855	
Rankings from AP Poll released prior to the game

== Preseason ==
On July 6, The Oregon Daily Journal reported that a vacationing Pitt Coach, Len Casanova, interviewed for the head coaching position at the University of Oregon. On July 8, the Pittsburgh Sun-Telegraph reported that Pitt Graduate Manager, Frank Carver, stated “I have no idea how the report of Casanova's applying at Oregon circulated, but all I can say is the whole story is crazy.” On July 17, The Pittsburgh Press reported that Casanova had indeed negotiated with Oregon. Casanova responded: “I absolutely have no intention of leaving Pitt nor have I even considered taking a post elsewhere since coming here.” The headline the following day read “Pitt Looking For New Coach Again.” The Pitt athletic committee released Casanova from his contract, and he accepted the coaching position at Oregon. He stated that the deciding factor was the health of his daughter. Hence, the Panthers lost their fifth coach in seven years, and Casanova was Athletic Director Tom Hamilton's “hand-picked choice”.

The Panthers interviewed Michigan State assistant coach Lowell Dawson, but he couldn't get a release from the school. The Pitt athletic committee drafted athletic director, Tom Hamilton, to take over the coaching duties for one season. He responded: “I like to coach football, but I don't want it for a lifetime job. I've been through that. This is merely a temporary adjustment. After this Fall, when it's 'open season' on coaches, we should be able to announce a new one. That will give us plenty of time to look over the field.”

On September 4, 40 upperclassmen and 20 freshmen (who were eligible for varsity play in 1951) opened fall camp at Ligonier, PA under the tutelage of Coach Hamilton. The Panthers practiced on the high school field, and stayed at the Fort Ligonier Hotel for three weeks. On September 15, the Panthers traveled to Bethlehem, PA to scrimmage with the Lehigh Engineers. The Panthers won 19–0. The following Saturday, the Rutgers Queensmen came to Ligonier for a scrimmage and the Panthers won 16–7. The squad returned to Pittsburgh on September 22 for the start of classes.

== Coaching staff ==
1951 Pittsburgh Panthers football staff
Coaching staff: Thomas J. Hamilton – interim head coach; Steve Hokuf – line coach; Edgar Jones – backfield coach; Robert Timmons – end coach; Steve Petro – jayvee coach; Ernie Hefferle – freshman coach; Walter Cummins– freshman coach	Support staff: Thomas J. Hamilton – director of athletics and physical education; Frank Carver – graduate manager; Bill Heyman – publicity director; Dr. Ralph Shanor – team physician; Dr. Dan Dickinson – team physician; Howard Waite – trainer; Bill Haines – equipment manager; Alex Kramer– student manager

== Roster ==
1951 Pittsburgh Panthers football roster
Player	Position	Games	Weight	Height	Class	Prep School	Hometown
Blair Kramer*	quarterback	6	185	5 ft 10 in	junior	South Hills H. S.	Pittsburgh, PA
Bob Wrabley*	quarterback	6	165	5 ft 9 in	freshman	Central Catholic H. S.	Pittsburgh, PA
Henry Ford*	quarterback	10	175	5 ft 10 in	freshman	Schenley H. S.	Pittsburgh, PA
Bill Hoffman	quarterback	1	185	5 ft 11 in	freshman	Greensburg H. S.	Greensburg, PA
Bob Bestwick*	quarterback	9	180	5 ft 11 in	senior	Shaler H. S.	Shaler Township, PA
Paul Chess*	fullback	7	185	6 ft	junior	Meadville H. S.	Meadville, PA
Don Waters	halfback	1	175	5 ft 11in	freshman		
Steve Pepoy	halfback	0	180	5 ft 11 in	freshman	Conemaugh Twp. H. S.	Davidsville., PA
Bill Sichko*	left halfback	9	180	6 ft	senior	German Twp. H. S.	McClellandtown, PA
Ray Ferguson*	left halfback	10	185	5 ft 11 in	sophomore	Jersey Shore Area H. S.	Jersey Shore, PA
Dick McCabe*	left halfback	5	165	6 ft 1 in	freshman	North Catholic H. S.	Pittsburgh, PA
Dave Fyock	right halfback	0	168	5 ft 8 in	senior	Evans City H. S.	Evans City, PA
John Jacobs	halfback	5	181	5 ft 11 in	freshman	Georges Twp. H. S.	Georges Twp., PA
Lee Bero	halfback	0	160	5 ft 10 in	freshman	South Union H. S.	South Union, PA
William Reynolds*	right halfback	10	185	5 ft 10 in	junior	St. Mary's H. S.	St. Mary's, WV
Louis Cimaroli*	left halfback	10	165	5 ft 10 in	sophomore	Bridgeville H. S.	Bridgeville, PA
Paul Mikanik	right halfback	3	165	5 ft 7 in	freshman	Follansbee H. S.	Follansbee, WV
Joseph Capp	fullback	0	195	5 ft 10 in	junior	Newton Falls H. S.	Newton Falls, OH
James Campbell*	right halfback	8	195	5 ft 9 in	senior	Derry Twp. H. S.	Derry Township, PA
Bobbie Ingram	right halfback	0	168	5 ft 10 in	sophomore	St. Mary's H. S.	St. Mary's, WV
Paul Blanda*	fullback	9	180	6 ft	freshman	Youngwood H. S.	Youngwood, PA
Robert Osterhout	fullback	2	195	5 ft 11 in	junior	Rutherford H. S.	Rutherford, NJ
Bobby Epps*	fullback	10	190	5 ft 8 in	sophomore	Swissvale H. S.	Swissvale, PA
Donald Schlick	center	1	200	6 ft 1 in	freshman	Wheeling H. S.	Wheeling, WV
Gabe Gembarosky*	center	6	200	6 ft	junior	Donora H. S.	Donora, PA
John Dazio*	center	9	205	6 ft	senior	Coatesville H. S.	Coatesville, PA
William Ewing*	guard	9	190	5 ft 10 in	senior	Peabody H. S.	Pittsburgh, PA
Ray Holleran	center	0	185	6 ft 1 in	sophomore	Central Catholic H. S.	Pittsburgh, PA
Neil Huffman	guard	3	220	6 ft 2 in	junior	Ostrander H. S.	Ostrander, OH
Bob Ballock	left guard	2	183	6 ft	freshman	Farrell H. S.	Farrell, PA
Charles Yost*	left guard	6	205	6 ft	senior	Youngstown H. S.	Youngstown, OH
Joseph Kane	left guard	0	185	5 ft 8 in	junior	Munhall H. S.	Munhall, PA
Anthony Romantino*	right guard	10	175	5 ft 8 in	junior	Donora H. S.	Donora, PA
Harold Hunter	left guard	1	205	6 ft 1 in	freshman	Canonsburg H. S.	Canonsburg, PA
Rudy Andabaker*	left guard	10	192	6 ft	senior	Donora H. S.	Donora, PA
Joseph Schmidt*	right guard	7	205	6 ft	junior	Brentwood H. S.	Brentwood, PA
Merle DeLuca*	right guard	10	191	5 ft 10 in	junior	Westinghouse H. S.	Pittsburgh, PA
Nick Hartman	left guard	0	185	6 ft 2 in	sophomore	Baldwin Twp. H. S.	Baldwin Twp., PA
Dave Adams*	left guard	5	215	6 ft 1 in	sophomore	Bellaire H. S.	Bellaire, OH
John Reger	right guard	1	205	6 ft	sophomore	Wheeling H. S.	Wheeling, WV
Donald Anthony	left guard	4	195	5 ft 11 in	freshman	Canonsburg H. S.	Canonsburg, PA
Roger Booth	right guard	0	195	6 ft	freshman	Woonsocket H. S.	Woonsocket, RI
James Croyle	right guard	1	200	6 ft	freshman	Rimersburg H. S.	Rimersburg, PA
Norman Chizmar	left guard	0	190	6 ft	sophomore	Highland H. S.	Highland, IN
Eldred Kraemer*	right tackle	10	220	6 ft 2 in	freshman	Clear Lake H. S.	Clear Lake, MN
Frank DiLeo	right tackle	0	195	5 ft 10 in	junior	Westinghouse H. S.	Pittsburgh, PA
Otto Kneidinger	left tackle	4	205	6 ft 3 in	freshman	Bellwood H. S.	Bellwood, PA
Robert Nesbitt	right tackle	1	210	6 ft 3 in	freshman	Washington H. S.	Washington, PA
Bob Brennen*	left tackle	9	215	6 ft 1 in	senior	North Catholic H. S.	Pittsburgh, PA
Alfred Smalara*	right tackle	7	200	6 ft	senior	Springdale H. S.	Springdale, PA
Stuart Kline*	center	8	205	6 ft	junior	Johnstown H. S.	Johnstown, PA
William Priatko	left tackle	2	210	6 ft 2 in	sophomore	North Braddock H. S.	North Braddock, PA
William Gasparovic*	right tackle	10	205	6 ft 1 in	senior	Steelton H.S.	Steelton, PA
Louis Palatella*	right tackle	8	215	6 ft 1 in	freshman	Vandergrift H.S.	Vandergrift, PA
Joseph Bozek*	right end	10	197	6 ft 2 in	junior	Rochester H. S.	Rochester, PA
Chris Warriner*	left end	10	185	5 ft 10 in	senior	Tarentum H. S.	Tarentum, PA
George Glagola*	left end	10	190	6 ft 2 in	sophomore	German Township H. S.	McClellandtown, PA
Joe Zombek*	left end	8	185	6 ft	sophomore	Carnegie H. S.	Carnegie, PA
Robert McQuade	right end	2	180	6 ft 1 in	freshman	Indiana H. S.	Indiana, PA
Bill Adams*	lefsart end	10	185	6 ft 2 in	sophomore	Oakmont H. S.	Oakmont, PA
Glenn Dillon	left end	2	185	6 ft 1 in	freshman	Titusville H. S.	Titusville, PA
Richard Dietrick*	right end	8	215	6 ft 2 in	sophomore	Danville H. S.	Danville, PA
Bernard Eisen*	left end	6	190	6 ft 1 in	freshman	Schenley H. S.	Pittsburgh, PA
* Letterman

== Game summaries ==
=== Duke ===
Week 1: Duke at Pitt

Team	1	2	3	4	Total
• Duke	7	6	0	6	19
Pitt	7	0	7	0	14

- Date: September 29, 1951
- Location: Pitt Stadium
  Pittsburgh, PA
- Game start: 2:00 p.m.
- Game attendance: 20,066
- Game weather: fair and cool
- Referee: Wilburn Clary (South Carolina)

Scoring summary
1	DUKE	Red Smith 3-yard run (Ray Green kick)	DUKE 7–0
1	PITT	Louis Cimarolli 15-yard run (Nick Bolkovac kick)	TIED 7–7
2	DUKE	Red Smith 3-yard run ( kick missed)	DUKE 13–7
3	PITT	Chris Warriner 16-yard pass from Bob Bestwick (Bolkovac kick )	PITT 14–13
4	DUKE	Charlie Smith 1-yard run ( kick missed )	DUKE 19–14

On September 29, the Coach Hamilton-led Panthers opened the season against the Duke Blue Devils. Duke led the all-time series 5–3 and had won the past four contests. Duke was led by first-year coach William D. Murray. His Devils were 1–0, after beating South Carolina 34–6 to open their season.

The game was broadcast on WDTV and Mel Allen was the announcer.

In front of 20,066 fans, the Panthers made too many mistakes, and lost to the Blue Devils 19–14. Duke blocked a punt, intercepted 3 passes and recovered a fumble. The Panthers received the opening kick-off, and on first down Duke guard, John Carey, intercepted Bob Bestwick's pass on the Panther 42-yard line. Eleven plays moved the ball to the Panthers 3-yard line. Red Smith ran into the end zone on the next play and Ray Green's placement made it 7–0 in favor of Duke. The Panthers answered with a 68-yard scoring drive. Lou Cimarolli raced around end from the 15-yard line for the touchdown. Paul Blanda's extra point tied the game. In the second quarter, Duke blocked a Panther punt and gained possession on the Panther 15-yard line. Red Smith scored from the 3-yard line again, but Green missed the point after. Duke led 13–7 at halftime. The Panthers engineered a 92-yard scoring drive to start the third period. Chris Warriner caught a 16-yard pass from Bob Bestwick for the score. Blanda's extra point put Pitt ahead 14–13. The Panther defense stopped the next Duke threat on their 15-yard line. In the fourth quarter the Devils returned a Pitt punt to the Panthers 26-yard line. On the fourth play Charlie Smith scored on a 1-yard run, and Green missed the extra point. Duke 19– Pitt 14.

The Pitt starting line-up for the game against Duke was Chris Warriner (left end), Bob Brennan (left tackle), Rudy Andabaker (left guard), John Dazio (center), Merle DeLuca (right guard), Eldred Kraemer (right tackle), Richard Dietrick (right end), Bob Bestwick (quarterback), Lou Cimarolli (left halfback), Bill Reynolds (right halfback) and Bobby Epps (fullback). Substitutes appearing in the game for Pitt were George Glagola, Joe Bozek, William Adams, William Priatko, Bill Gasparovic, Charles Yost, John Reger, Tony Romantino, Gabe Gembarosky, Ray Ferguson, Henry Ford, Richie McCabe, Paul Blanda, William Ewing and Bill Sichko.

=== at Indiana ===
Week 2: Pitt at Indiana

Team	1	2	3	4	Total
Pitt	0	6	0	0	6
• Indiana	0	6	7	0	13

- Date: October 6, 1951
- Location: Memorial Stadium
  Bloomington, IN
- Game start: 1:30 p.m.
- Game attendance: 28,000
- Game weather: cool and cloudy
- Referee: C. A. Wertz

Scoring summary
2	PITT	Billy Reynolds 17-yard run ( kick missed)	PITT 6–0
2	IND	Gene Gedman 85-yard run (kick missed)	TIED 6–6
3	IND	Gene Gedman 16-yard pass from Lou D'Achille (D'Achille kick)	IND 13–6

Pitt's second game of the season was in Bloomington, IN versus the Indiana Hoosiers. The Panthers were 1–6 all-time against Indiana, and were 0–4 in Bloomington. Coach Clyde B. Smith's squad was 0–1 after losing to Notre Dame in their opening game.

In front of 28,000 Hoosiers fans, the mistake-prone Panthers lost again 13–6. The Panthers scored first on a 17-yard scamper by halfback Bill Reynolds. Paul Blanda's placement went wide. Indiana fullback Gene Gedman (a Duquesne, PA native) answered with an 85-yard touchdown run to tie the score. Lou D'Achille missed the placement. In the third quarter, Gedman caught a 16-yard pass from D'Achille for the go-ahead touchdown. D'Achille added the extra point. Indiana 13 to Pitt 6. The Panthers squandered three scoring opportunities in the second half. First, they drove to the Hoosiers 16-yard line and Blanda missed a 29-yard field goal. The next drive ended with a fumble. Their final series ended with an interception.

The Pitt starting line-up for the game against Indiana was George Glagola (left end), Bob Brennan (left tackle), Rudy Andabaker (left guard), John Dazio (center), Tony Romantino (right guard), Bill Gasparovic (right tackle), Richard Dietrick (right end), Bob Bestwick (quarterback), Lou Cimarolli (left halfback), Bill Reynolds (right halfback) and Bobby Epps (fullback). Substitutes appearing in the game for Pitt were Bernard Eisen, Chris Warriner, Joe Bozek, Bill Adams, Otto Kneidinger, Bill Priatko, Donald Anthony, Eldred Kraemer, Albert Smalara, Joe Zombek, Neil Huffman, Tony Romantino, Merle DeLuca, Joe Schmidt, Gabe Gembarosky, Stuart Kline, Eldred Kraemer, Albert Smalara, Joe Bozek, Bill Adams, Henry Ford, Blair Kramer, Ray Ferguson, Bill Sichko, Richie McCabe, Jim Campbell, Paul Blanda and Paul Chess.

=== at Iowa ===
Week 3: Pitt at Iowa

Team	1	2	3	4	Total
Pitt	3	7	0	7	17
• Iowa	7	7	0	20	34

- Date: October 13, 1951
- Location: Iowa Stadium
  Iowa City, IA
- Game start: 1:30 p.m.
- Game attendance: 35,123
- Game weather: warm and cloudy
- Referee: Jay Berwanger

Scoring summary
1	PITT	Paul Blanda 22-yard field goal	PITT 3–0
1	IOWA	Burt Britzmann 1-yard run ( Bill Reichardt kick)	IOWA 7–3
2	IOWA	Dusty Rice 14-yard pass from Britzmann (Reichardt kick )	IOWA 14–3
2	PITT	Chris Warriner 10-yard pass from Bob Bestwick (Nick Bolkovac kick)	IOWA 14–10
4	IOWA	Don Commack 25-yard pass from Britzmann ( kick missed)	IOWA 21–10
4	IOWA	Rice 38-yard pass from Britzmann (Reichardt kick)	IOWA 28–10
4	IOWA	Loranzie Williams 47-yard run (Reichardt kick )	IOWA 34–10
4	PITT	James Campbell 60-yard pass from Paul Blanda ( Bolkovac kick )	IOWA 34–17

The Panthers third game was against the Iowa Hawkeyes in Iowa City, IA. This was the second meeting between these schools. Pitt beat the Hawkeyes in 1931 (20–0). Iowa was 1–1 on the season. On October 12, the 41-member Pitt squad flew, via Pan American, to Cedar Rapids, IA and housed at the Montrose Hotel. Coach Hamilton held a team practice on the Coe College field.

On October 13, the underdog Pitt Panthers lost to the Iowa Hawkeyes 34–17 before a crowd of 35,123 in Iowa Stadium. Pitt was able to keep it close for three quarters, but the home team scored 3 touchdowns in the final period to secure the victory. In the first quarter Pitt guard, Bill Ewing, recovered an Iowa fumble on the Hawkeyes's 14-yard line. The Iowa defense forced a field goal attempt, and Paul Blanda converted from 20-yards. Iowa answered with two touchdowns to go ahead 14–3. Pitt halfback, Lou Cimarolli, returned the ensuing kick-off 65 yards to the Iowa 25-yard line. On the third play, Bob Bestwick threw a 10-yard scoring pass to Chris Warriner, and Blanda added the extra point to make the score 14–10, where it remained until halftime. Pitt's Bestwick, Warriner, Joe Schmidt and Bob Brennan were injured and did not play in the second half. In the final period, Pitt lost the ball on downs on the Iowa 21-yard line. The Hawkeyes scored on a 25-yard pass from Britzmann to Commack, who caught the ball laying on his back. A Pitt fumble and an interception led to the Hawkeyes final two touchdowns. Pitt added a late score by faking a punt. Blanda tossed a pass to James Campbell in the flat and he raced 60-yards for the score. Blanda added the placement.

The Pitt starting lineup for the game against Iowa was Chris Warriner (left end), Bob Brennen (left tackle), Rudy Andabaker (left guard), John Dazio (center), Tony Romantino (right guard), Eldred Kraemer (right tackle), Richard Dietrick (right end), Bob Bestwick (quarterback), Louis Cimarolli (left halfback), Bill Reynolds (right halfback) and Bobby Epps (fullback). Substitutes appearing in the game for Pitt were Bill Adams, George Glagola, Otto Kniedinger, Glen Dillon, Donald Anthony, Charles Yost, Stuart Kline, William Ewing, Merle DeLuca, Joe Schmidt, Albert Smalara, Tony Gasparovic, Louis Palatella, Bernard Eisen, Joe Bozek, Joe Zombek, Henry Ford, Blair Kramer, Ray Ferguson, Bill Sichko, Bill Reynolds, Paul Blanda, Paul Chess and Bob Osterhout.

=== Notre Dame ===
Week 4: Notre Dame at Pitt

Team	1	2	3	4	Total
• Notre Dame	6	14	6	7	33
Pitt	0	0	0	0	0

- Date: October 20, 1951
- Location: Pitt Stadium
  Pittsburgh, PA
- Game start: 2:00 p.m.
- Game attendance: 60,127
- Game weather: sunshine
- Referee: George W. Rennix (Minnesota)

Scoring summary
1	ND	Billy Barrett 10-yard pass from John Mazur (kick missed)	ND 6–0
2	ND	Barrett 28-yard pass from Mazur (Menil Mavraides kick)	ND 13–0
2	ND	Mazur 1-yard run ( Mavraides kick )	ND 20–0
3	ND	Mazur 1-yard run ( kick missed )	ND 26–0
4	ND	Joe Heap 13-yard run ( Mavraides kick )	ND 33–0

The fourth game of the season was against the Notre Dame Fighting Irish. Notre Dame led the all-time series 12–5–1 and had out scored the Panthers 269-22 in the previous seven games. Pitt last beat the Irish in 1937.

Coach Hamilton named Blair Kramer starting quarterback in place of the injured Bob Bestwick, and Bill Adams replaced injured left end Chris Warriner.

In front of 60,127 fans, Pitt ran its losing streak to Notre Dame to eight games with a 33–0 loss. Irish quarterback, John Mazur threw two touchdown passes to Billy Barrett and then ran 1-yard for another score to close out the first half. Notre Dame added a touchdown in both the third and fourth quarters. Menil Mavraides converted 3 of 5 placements. The Panthers' lone scoring opportunity came in the third quarter. Notre Dame fumbled the kick-off and Pitt recovered on the Irish 23-yard line. Four plays moved the ball to the 10-yard line. Pitt quarterback, Blair Kramer, was sacked on fourth down and Notre Dame took control.

The Pitt starting lineup for the game against Notre Dame was Bill Adams (left end), Bob Brennen (left tackle), Rudy Andabaker (left guard), John Dazio (center), Merle DeLuca (right guard), Bill Gasparovic (right tackle), Richard Dietrick (right end), Blair Kramer (quarterback), Louis Cimarolli (left halfback), Bill Reynolds (right halfback) and Bobby Epps (fullback). Substitutes appearing in the game for Pitt were Joe Zombeck, Joe Bozek, Bernard Eisen, Chris Warriner, George Glagola, Albert Smalara, Eldred Kraemer, Louis Palatella, Otto Kneidinger, Tony Romantino, Dave Adams, Joe Schmidt, Charles Yost, Bill Ewing, Henry Ford, Paul Blanda, Bill Sichko, Ray Ferguson, Paul Chess, James Campbell, Bob Wrabley and Bob Osterhout.

=== at Michigan State ===
Week 5: Pitt at Michigan State

Team	1	2	3	4	Total
Pitt	0	20	0	6	26
• Michigan State	13	6	20	14	53

- Date: October 27, 1951
- Location: Macklin Stadium
  East Lansing, MI
- Game start: 2:00 p.m.
- Game attendance: 42,163
- Game weather: cool
- Referee: Jay Berwanger

Scoring summary
1	MSC	Dick Panin 60-yard run (kick missed)	MSC 6–0
1	MSC	Al Dorow 1-yard pass from Don McAuliffe ( Eugene Lekena kick)	MSC 13–0
2	PITT	Lou Cimarolli 17-yard pass from Bob Bestwick ( kick missed )	MSC 13–6
2	PITT	Billy Reynolds 3-yard run (Paul Blanda kick)	TIED 13–13
2	IOWA	McAuliffe 11-yard run ( kick missed)	MSC 19–13
2	PITT	Chris Warriner 4-yard pass from Bestwick (Blanda kick)	PITT 20–19
3	MSC	McAuliffe 8-yard run ( kick missed )	MSC 25–20
3	MSC	Jim Ellis 54-yard punt return (Bill Carey kick )	MSC 32–20
3	MSC	Leroy Bolden 9-yard pass from Dorow (Carey kick )	MSC 39–20
4	PITT	Paul Chess 2-yard run ( kick missed )	MSC 39–26
4	MSC	Paul Dekker 7-yard pass from Dorow (Carey kick )	MSC 46–26
4	MSC	Wayne Benson 24-yard run ( Carey kick )	MSC 53–26

For their fifth game of the season, the Pitt Panthers, winless in their past seven games, traveled to East Lansing, Michigan to play the No. 2 Michigan State Spartans. The Panthers flew to Lansing, and stayed at the Olds Hotel. Michigan State led the all-time series 2–0. Coach Biggie Munn's Spartans were 5–0 on the season, and on an 11 game win streak over two seasons.

Coach Hamilton changed the Panthers starting lineup: Bob Bestwick (quarterback) and Chris Warriner (end) were healthy, Otto Kneidinger replaced Bob Brennen at left tackle, Eldred Kraemer was back at right tackle, Tony Romantino started at right guard, and Louis Cimarolli and Bill Sichko were the halfbacks.

The Pitt Panthers went into halftime leading the Spartans 20–19. With 42,163 Michigan State fans in attendance, the second-ranked team in the nation scored 5 second half touchdowns to win handily, 53–26, and extend their win streak to 12 games. On their first possession, State fullback, Dick Panin opened the scoring with a 60-yard end run. On their next possession, the Spartans went 59-yards for the second touchdown (a 1-yard pass from Don McAuliffe to Al Dorow). Eugene Lekena converted the second placement. The Panthers answered with an 80-yard drive, capped with a 16-yard pass from Bob Bestwick to Lou Cimarolli. Paul Blanda missed the extra point. The Panthers offense went 89-yards the next time they had the ball. Billy Reynolds went off-tackle from the 3-yard line for the score. Blanda converted to tie the score at 13–13. State received the kick-off and scored in 4 plays. Lekenta missed the extra point. Pitt answered with a 77-yard drive. A 4-yard pass from Bestwick to Chris Warriner tied the score. Blanda's placement put Pitt ahead at the break. Michigan State owned the second half. Don McAuliffe, Jim Ellis, Leroy Bolden, Paul Dekker and Wayne Benson scored the touchdowns. Bill Carey kicked 4 of 5 extra points. The Panthers managed one scoring drive with Paul Chess running in from the 2-yard line. Blanda missed the placement.

The Pitt starting lineup for the game against Michigan State was Chris Warriner (left end), Otto Kneidinger (left tackle), Rudy Andabaker (left guard), John Dazio (center), Tony Romantino (right guard), Eldred Kraemer (right tackle), Richard Dietrick (right end), Bob Bestwick (quarterback), Louis Cimarolli (left halfback), Bill Sichko (right halfback) and Bobby Epps (fullback). Substitutes appearing in the game for Pitt were Joe Zombek, Bill Adams, George Glagola, Richard McQuade, Albert Smalara, Charles Yost, Dave Adams, Gabe Gembrosky, Bill Ewing, Stuart Kline, Joe Schmidt, Merle DeLuca, Bill Gasparovic, Louis Palatella, Joe Bozek, Henry Ford, Blair Kramer, Ray Ferguson, Bob Wrabley, James Campbell, Richard McCabe, Paul Blanda and Paul Chess.

=== at Rice ===
Week 6: Pitt at Rice

Team	1	2	3	4	Total
Pitt	0	6	7	0	13
• Rice	0	7	0	14	21

- Date: November 3, 1951
- Location: Rice Stadium
  Houston, TX
- Game start: 3:00 p.m. EST
- Game attendance: 26,000
- Game weather: cold
- Referee: F. C. Baccus

Scoring summary
1	RICE	Bob Garbrecht 2-yard run(Bill Wright kick )	RICE 7–0
2	PITT	Lou Cimarolli 1-yard run ( kick missed)	RICE 7–6
3	PITT	Billy Reynolds 2-yard run ( Paul Blanda kick )	PITT 13–7
4	RICE	Zonny McCurry 25-yard pass from Dan Drake (Wright kick )	RICE 14–13
4	RICE	Billy Daniels 26-yard run ( Wright kick )	RICE 21–13

The Panthers flew to Houston, TX to play the Rice Owls. It was their fourth road game in six contests. Coach Jess Neely's squad was 2–3 on the season. In their only other meeting, the Owls beat the Panthers (14–7) in 1950. Rice end, Bill Howton, received All-American honors.

After the first five games, quarterback Bob Bestwick and end Chris Warriner set Pitt passing and receiving records. Bestwick set four records: 109 completed passes in a season; 26 completed passes in one game; 345 passing yards in one game and 331 total yards in one game. He tied the record for attempted passes in a season with 193. Chris Warriner set the receiving record with 41 pass receptions for his career.

Injuries caused changes to the lineup. Freshman running back Paul Mikanik replaced Bill Sichko at right halfback. Stuart Kline replaced John Dazio at center. Left tackle Otto Kneidinger left the team for family reasons and was replaced by Bob Brennen.

The Panthers ran their losing streak to nine games with a 21–13 loss to the Owls. Pitt led 13–7 with four minutes left in the game, but let the Owls score 2 unanswered touchdowns. Early in the second quarter Rice halfback Bob Garbrecht scored the first touchdown on a 2-yard plunge to cap an 80-yard drive. Bill Wright added the extra point. The Panthers answered with a 56-yard drive. Lou Cimarolli ran in from the 1-yard line, but Paul Blanda missed the placement and the score was 7–6 at halftime. Late in the third quarter, Pitt end Joe Bozek recovered a Rice fumble on the Owl 35-yard line. Bill Reynolds scored from the 2-yard line and Blanda kicked the extra point for a 13–7 Pitt lead. With four minutes left, Owl end Sonny McCurry caught a 25-yard touchdown pass from Dan Drake. 2 minutes later, Billy Daniels raced 25-yards for another Rice touchdown. Wright converted both placements.

Bob Bestwick, by completing 13 of 27 passes, broke two records and added to his totals set the previous week. He led the Panthers in career yards passing with 1,456 and passing attempts in a season with 220. Chris Warriner added 6 receptions for a total of 47 for his career.

The Pitt starting lineup for the game against Rice was Chris Warriner (left end), Bob Brennen (left tackle), Rudy Andabaker (left guard), Stuart Kline (center), Merle DeLuca (right guard), Eldred Kraemer (right tackle), Richard Dietrick (right end), Bob Bestwick (quarterback), Louis Cimarolli (left halfback), Paul Mikanik (right halfback) and Bobby Epps (fullback). Substitutes appearing in the game for Pitt were George Glagola, Joe Zombek, Bill Adams, Joe Bozek, Louis Palatella, Bill Gasparovic, Albert Smalara, Donald Anthony, Dave Adams, Tony Romantino, Charles Yost, Bob Ballock, Bill Ewing, Henry Ford, Ray Ferguson, John Jacobs, Bill Reynolds, James Campbell, Richie McCabe, Bob Wrabley and Paul Blanda.

=== Ohio State ===
Week 7: Ohio State at Pitt

Team	1	2	3	4	Total
• Ohio State	6	7	3	0	16
Pitt	0	0	0	14	14

- Date: November 10, 1951
- Location: Pitt Stadium
  Pittsburgh, PA
- Game start: 2:00 p.m.
- Game attendance: 34,757
- Game weather: warm and windy
- Referee: Lyle M. Clarno

Scoring summary
1	OSU	Curcillo 1-yard run (kick missed)	OSU 6–0
2	OSU	Curcillo 26-yard run (Vic Janowicz kick)	OSU 13–0
3	OSU	20-yard field goal Janowicz	OSU 16–0
3	PITT	Bobby Epps 1-yard run ( Bob Wrabley kick )	OSU 16–7
4	PITT	Bob Bestwick 1-yard run ( Wrabley kick )	OSU 16–14

On November 10, the Panthers played their Homecoming Day game against the Ohio State Buckeyes. First-year Coach Woody Hayes' squad was 3–2–1 for the season and ranked #20 by the Associated Press. They were led by 1950 All-American and Heisman Trophy winner halfback Vic Janowicz. Ohio State led the all-time series 11–3–1.

Coach Hamilton named tackle Bob Brennan and guard Rudy Andabaker co-captains for the remainder of the season. Bill Sichko replaced Lou Cimarolli at left halfback in the starting lineup.

In front of 34,757 Homecoming Day fans, the Panthers extended their losing streak to 10 games, as the Ohio State Buckeyes held on for a 16–14 victory. The Buckeyes scored in each of the first three quarters to build a 16–0 lead. Ohio quarterback Tony Curcillo scored twice. In the first period, he capped a 56-yard drive with a 1-yard touchdown run. Vic Janowicz missed the point after. Curcillo's second score came on a 26-yard run around right end. Janowicz added the extra point for a 13–0 halftime lead. In the third quarter, Janowicz kicked a field goal. The Panthers' offense produced two touchdowns in the final period. The first was a 46-yard drive that ended with fullback Bobby Epps scoring from the 1-yard line. Bob Wrabley's extra point was good. The last scoring drive was 75-yards, with Bob Bestwick scoring on a quarterback sneak with 38 seconds left on the clock. Wrabley's kick was good. Bob Bestwick completed 14 of 28 passes for 98 yards. Chris Warriner caught 3 passes for a total of 26, which surpassed the Pitt record for receptions (25) in a season.

The Pitt starting lineup for the game against Ohio State was Chris Warriner (left end), Bob Brennen (left tackle), Rudy Andabaker (left guard), Stuart Kline (center), Merle DeLuca (right guard), Eldred Kraemer (right tackle), Richard Dietrick (right end), Bob Bestwick (quarterback), Bill Sichko (left halfback), Paul Mikanik (right halfback) and Bobby Epps (fullback). Substitutes appearing in the game for the Panther were George Glagola, Joe Zombek, Bill Adams, Joe Bozek, Louis Palatella, Bill Gasparovic, Niel Hoffman, Joe Schmidt, Dave Adams, Tony Romantino, Bill Ewing, John Dazio, Henry Ford, Ray Ferguson, John Jacobs, Louis Cimarolli, James Campbell, Blair Kramer, Bob Wrabley and Bill Reynolds.

=== West Virginia ===
Week 8: West Virginia at Pitt

Team	1	2	3	4	Total
West Virginia	0	6	0	6	12
• Pitt	13	12	7	0	32

- Date: November 17, 1951
- Location: Pitt Stadium
  Pittsburgh, PA
- Game start: 2:00 p.m.
- Game attendance: 9,864
- Game weather: cold with snow
- Referee: John H. Coles (Westminster)

Scoring summary
1	PITT	Chris Warriner 14-yard pass from Bob Bestwick (kick missed)	PITT 6–0
1	PITT	Bill Reynolds 5-yard run (Paul Blanda kick)	PITT 13–0
2	PITT	James Campbell 1-yard run ( kick missed)	PITT 19–0
2	PITT	Campbell 5-yard run ( fumbled snap on extra point )	PITT 25–0
2	WVA	Bill Marker 16-yard pass from Gerry Fisher( kick missed )	PITT 25–6
3	PITT	George Glagola 11-yard pass from Bestwick (Blanda kick)	PITT 32–6
4	WVA	Marker 31-yard pass from Fisher ( kick missed )	PITT 32–12

The 1951 edition of the Backyard Brawl took place on November 17. The Panthers, with a record of 0–7, were 19 point favorites over second-year coach Art Lewis's 5–3 Mountaineers. The Panthers led the all-time series 33–9–1. Pitt end Dick Dietrick and halfback Paul Mikanik were injured in the Ohio State game and sidelined for this game.

In front of a chilly 9,684 fans, the Pittsburgh Panthers ended their losing streak by outscoring the Mountaineers 32–12. Pitt scored four touchdowns in the first half. A Bob Bestwick 14-yard pass to Chris Warriner started the rout. The running of Bill Reynolds and James Campbell (twice) accounted for the next three. Paul Blanda was good on 1 of 4 extra points. Late in the second period, West Virginia end, Bill Marker caught a 16-yard touchdown pass from Gerry Fisher and Pitt led at halftime 25–6. After intermission, Bob Bestwick connected with George Glagola for an 11-yard touchdown pass and Blanda added the extra point to close the Panthers scoring. In the final quarter, the passing duo of Fisher and Marker connected for a 31-yard touchdown pass to cut the lead to 32–12. Bob Bestwick completed 11 of 17 passes for 171 yards. He had 966 passing yards for the season, which broke Paul Rickards 1944 record of 897. Chris Warriner caught 3 passes for 42 yards. His touchdown reception was his fourth of the season, which tied him with Jimmy Joe Robinson (1949), and sixth of his career, which tied him with Bill McPeak (1945–48).

The starting lineup for Pitt against West Virginia was Chris Warriner (left end), Bob Brennen (left tackle), Rudy Andabaker (left guard), John Dazio (center), Merle DeLuca (right guard), Eldred Kraemer (right tackle), Bill Adams (right end), Bob Bestwick (quarterback), Bill Sichko (left halfback), Bobby Epps (right halfback) and James Campbell (fullback). Substitutes appearing in the game for the Panther were George Glagola, Joe Bozek, Bernard Eisen, Glenn Dillon, Robert McQuade, Louis Palatella, Bill Gasparovic, Albert Smalara, Stuart Kline, Neil Hoffman, Bob Nesbitt, Bill Ewing, Dave Adams, Donald Anthony, Tony Romantino, Don Schlick, James Croyle, Harold Hunter, Joe Schmidt, Bob Ballock, Gabe Gembarosky, Blair Kramer, John Jacobs, Paul Blanda, Paul Chess, Ray Ferguson, Bill Reynolds, Henry Ford, Bob Wrabley, Louis Cimarolli, Don Waters, Bill Hoffman, Paul Mikanik and Richie McCabe.

=== Penn State ===
Week 9: Penn State at Pitt

Team	1	2	3	4	Total
Penn State	0	0	0	7	7
• Pitt	0	7	0	6	13

- Date: November 24, 1951
- Location: Pitt Stadium
  Pittsburgh, PA
- Game start: 2:00 p.m.
- Game attendance: 20,145
- Game weather: cloudy and cold
- Referee: Stanley F. Ebert (Duquesne)

Scoring summary
1	PITT	Chris Warriner 32-yard pass from Bob Bestwick (Paul Blanda kick )	PITT 7–0
4	PSU	Jesse Arnelle 9-yard pass from Bob Szajna (Bill Leonard kick )	TIED 7–7
4	PITT	Paul Chess 16-yard run ( kick missed )	PITT 13–7

On November 24, the Panthers played the Penn State Nittany Lions for the fifty-first time. Pitt led the series 29–19–2. Second-year coach Rip Engle's Lions were 5–3, but Pitt was a 7 point favorite. This was the final collegiate home game for eleven Panthers: Bob Bestwick, Chris Warriner, James Campbell, Bill Sichko, Johnny Dazio, Bill Ewing, Charles Yost, Rudy Andabaker, Bob Brennen, Bill Gasparovic and Al Smalara.

Pitt proved the oddsmakers correct by beating the Nittanies 13–7 for their second win in a row. Late in the first half, Bob Bestwick threw a 32-yard touchdown pass to Chris Warriner. Paul Blanda kicked the extra point. Pitt led at halftime 7–0. The third quarter was scoreless. In the final period Blanda missed a 30-yard field goal. The Lions gained possession on their 22-yard line, and drove 78 yards for the tying touchdown. Jesse Arnelle caught a 6-yard pass from Bob Szajna, and Bill Leonard kicked the extra point. Pitt answered with a 12-play, 70-yard drive. Paul Chess raced 16 yards around right end for the score. Blanda missed the extra point, but the Panthers led 13–7. Pitt halfback Bill Reynolds intercepted a Szajna pass, and the Panthers ran out the clock.

The Pitt starting lineup for the game with Penn State was Chris Warriner (left end), Bob Brennen (left tackle), Rudy Andabaker (left guard), Bill Ewing (center), Merle DeLuca (right guard), Eldred Kraemer (right tackle), Bill Adams (right end), Bob Bestwick (quarterback), Bill Reynolds (left halfback), James Campbell (right halfback) and Bobby Epps (fullback). Substitutes appearing in the game for the Panther were George Glagola, Joe Bozek, Joe Zombek, Bernard Eisen, Louis Palatella, Bill Gasparovic, Tony Romantino, Stuart Kline, Joe Schmidt, Gabe Gembarosky, John Dazio, John Jacobs, Paul Blanda, Paul Chess, Ray Ferguson, Henry Ford, Bob Wrabley, Louis Cimarolli and Bill Sichko.

=== at Miami ===
Week 10: Pitt at Miami

Team	1	2	3	4	Total
• Pitt	14	0	7	0	21
Miami	0	0	0	7	7

- Date: December 7, 1951
- Location: Burdine Stadium
  Miami, FL
- Game start: 8:15 p.m.
- Game attendance: 39,855
- Game weather: warm
- Referee: Harry Dayhoff (Bucknell)

Scoring summary
1	PITT	Lou Cimarolli 3-yard run (Paul Blanda kick)	PITT 7–0
1	PITT	Bill Sichko 4-yard run (Blanda kick)	PITT 14–0
3	PITT	Cimarolli 2-yard run (Blanda kick)	PITT 21–0
4	MIAMI	Johnny Bow 16-yard run (Elmer Tremont kick )	PITT 21–7

The Panthers, on a two game win streak, ended their season in Miami, FL against Coach Andy Gustafson's Hurricanes. The teams met in 1950 for the first time at Pitt Stadium, with Miami beating the Panthers 28–0. Gustafson's present squad was 7–2 on the season (6–0 at home), and headed to the Gator Bowl on New Year's Day.

The Panthers flew to Miami on Thursday afternoon, and practiced in the evening at Memorial High School Field in Miami Beach. They stayed at the Surf Hotel. Coach Hamilton employed the same lineup he used against Penn State, except a healthy Dick Dietrick replaced Bill Adams at right end. This was the first night game for the Pitt Panthers.

In front of 39,855 fans, the Panthers ended their season on a three game win streak, with a 21–7 victory over the two-touchdown favored Hurricanes. After an exchange of punts the Panthers had possession on their own 40-yard line. A 7-play touchdown drive was capped with Lou Cimarolli's 3-yard run. Paul Blanda kicked the extra point. Before the first quarter ended, Bill Gasparovic recovered a Miami fumble on the Canes' 25-yard line. A 5-play drive ended with a 5-yard touchdown dash by Bill Sichko. Blanda's kick made it 14–0 at halftime. The Panthers started the second half with a 64-yard touchdown drive. Lou Cimarolli ran in from the 2-yard line and Blanda added his third placement for a 21–0 Pitt lead. The Hurricanes scored in the final period. Leo Martin blocked a Paul Chess punt and recovered it on the Panthers 29-yard line. On the seventh play Johnny Bow scored on a 10-yard end run and Elmer Tremont booted the point after to make the final 21–7.

The Pitt starting lineup for the game against Miami was Chris Warriner (left end), Bob Brennen (left tackle), Rudy Andabaker (left guard), John Dazio (center), Merle DeLuca (right guard), Bill Gasparovic (right tackle), Dietrick (right end), Bob Bestwick (quarterback), Lou Cimarolli (left halfback), Bill Reynolds (right halfback) and Bobby Epps (fullback). Substitutes appearing in the game for the Panther were George Glagola, Joe Bozek, Joe Zombek, Bernard Eisen, Louis Palatella, Tony Romantino, Charles Yost, Stuart Kline, Joe Schmidt, Gabe Gembarosky, Bill Ewing, Eldred Kraemer, Albert Smalara, John Jacobs, Paul Blanda, Paul Chess, Ray Ferguson, Henry Ford, James Campbell, and Bill Sichko.

== Individual scoring summary ==
1951 Pittsburgh Panthers scoring summary
Player	Touchdowns	Extra points	Field goals	Safety	Points
Louis Cimarolli	5	0	0	0	30
Chris Warriner	5	0	0	0	30
Bill Reynolds	4	0	0	0	24
James Campbell	3	0	0	0	18
Paul Blanda	0	13	1	0	16
Paul Chess	2	0	0	0	12
George Glagola	1	0	0	0	6
William Sichko	1	0	0	0	6
Bobby Epps	1	0	0	0	6
Robert Bestwick	1	0	0	0	6
Bob Wrabley	0	2	0	0	2
Totals	23	15	1	0	156

== Postseason ==
Quarterback Bob Bestwick set the following passing records during the 1951 season: 1,924 passing yards for career; 1,165 passing yards for season; 345 passing yards for game; 293 total pass attempts for career; 178 pass attempts for season; 162 passes completed for career; 99 passes completed for season; 26 passes completed for one game; 7 touchdown passes for one season; and 331 yards total offense for one game.

End Chris Warriner set the following receiving records during the 1951 season: 817 yards receiving for career; 502 yards receiving for season; 61 passes received for career; 37 passes received for season; 7 touchdown receptions for career; and 5 touchdown receptions for one season.

Bob Bestwick and Chris Warriner played in the 1951 Blue-Gray football game on December 29 in Montgomery, AL.

On January 14, 1952 the University of Pittsburgh Board of Trustees approved the hiring of Lowell P. Dawson as their head football coach. He was the fourth coach in four years.

== Team players drafted into the NFL ==
The following players were selected in the 1952 NFL draft.

Player	Position	Round	Pick	NFL club
Bob Bestwick	quarterback	24	282	Pittsburgh Steelers
Chris Warriner	end	29	342	Pittsburgh Steelers
