= 1951 Army Cadets football team =

American college football season

1951 Army Cadets football
- Conference: Independent
- Record: 2–7
- Head coach: Earl Blaik (11th season)
- Captain: Game captains
- Home stadium: Michie Stadium

1951 Eastern college football independents records
	Conf.			Overall
Team	W	L	T	W		L		T
Bucknell		–		9	–	0	–	0
No. 6 Princeton		–		9	–	0	–	0
Susquehanna		–		6	–	0	–	0
Trenton State		–		6	–	0	–	0
Northeastern		–		6	–	0	–	1
No. 19 Holy Cross		–		8	–	2	–	0
Carnegie Tech		–		6	–	2	–	0
Hofstra		–		6	–	2	–	1
Cornell		–		6	–	3	–	0
No. 16 Boston University		–		6	–	4	–	0
Temple		–		6	–	4	–	0
Columbia		–		5	–	3	–	0
Villanova		–		5	–	3	–	0
Fordham		–		5	–	4	–	0
Franklin & Marshall		–		5	–	4	–	0
Penn		–		5	–	4	–	0
Penn State		–		5	–	4	–	0
Syracuse		–		5	–	4	–	0
Buffalo		–		4	–	4	–	0
Colgate		–		4	–	5	–	0
Dartmouth		–		4	–	5	–	0
Drexel		–		3	–	4	–	0
Harvard		–		3	–	5	–	1
Boston College		–		3	–	6	–	0
Yale		–		2	–	5	–	2
Pittsburgh		–		3	–	7	–	0
Geneva		–		2	–	5	–	0
Army		–		2	–	7	–	0
Brown		–		2	–	7	–	0
NYU		–		1	–	7	–	0
Tufts		–		0	–	7	–	2
Rankings from AP Poll

The 1951 Army Cadets football team represented the United States Military Academy as an independent during the 1951 college football season. Led by head coach Earl Blaik, the team finished with a record of 2–7. The Cadets offense scored 116 points, while the defense allowed 183 points.

Army was ranked at No. 89 in the 1951 Litkenhous Ratings.

== Schedule ==
Date	Opponent	Site	Result	Attendance	Source
September 29	Villanova	Michie Stadium; West Point, NY	L 7–21		
October 6	at Northwestern	Dyche Stadium; Evanston, IL	L 14–20		
October 13	Dartmouth	Michie Stadium; West Point, NY	L 14–28	20,242	
October 20	at Harvard	Harvard Stadium; Boston, MA	L 21–22	14,000	
October 27	Columbia	Michie Stadium; West Point, NY	W 14–9	20,349	
November 3	vs. No. 7 USC	Yankee Stadium; Bronx, NY	L 6–28	16,508	
November 10	The Citadel	Michie Stadium; West Point, NY	W 27–6	28,183	
November 17	at Penn	Franklin Field; Philadelphia, PA	L 6–7	40,000	
December 1	vs. Navy	Philadelphia Municipal Stadium; Philadelphia, PA (Army–Navy Game)	L 7–42		
Rankings from AP Poll released prior to the game

== Offseason ==
In the offseason, Blaik was still agitated by the loss Army suffered to Navy in 1950. In addition, he was upset over the dismissal of General Douglas MacArthur. Sam Galiffa, who was part of the 1949 team, was now a decorated aide to General Matthew Ridgway. Galiffa arranged for members of the Army coaching staff to come to Japan and visit the troops. Vince Lombardi and Doug Kenna first visited Tokyo and conducted several football clinics for the troops stationed there. Although defensive coordinator Murray Warmath helped the discharged players relocate to other schools, it was his last year at Army. He left at the end of the season to become the head coach for Mississippi State.

== Honor code violation ==
A massive honor code academic violation was revealed in the spring of 1951. There were accusations that football players were distributing unauthorized academic information. This was reported to Colonel Paul Harkins on April 2. It was later revealed that Red Blaik's son, Bob, was part of the honor code violation. On August 3, the violations were announced and several athletes were implicated in the scandal.

Joseph P. Kennedy Sr. spoke to assistant coach Doug Kenna and he helped pay the way for several discharged players to attend the University of Notre Dame. Bob Blaik left Army for Colorado College. Of the players that were discharged, three went on to careers in the National Football League: Al Pollard, Gene Filipski and Ray Malavasi. Malavasi also became head coach of the Los Angeles Rams.

The event was dramatized in the 2005 ESPN film Code Breakers.

== Regular season ==
The makeshift team that was assembled had no involvement in the honor violation, but they were still a reminder of it. After losing several games to Ivy League schools, Army defeated Columbia for its first win. The team received a congratulatory note from General Douglas MacArthur.

In sixth week of the season, the Cadets played Frank Gifford and his USC Trojans squad at Yankee Stadium. Before the Army–Navy Game, the Cadets had a record of 2–6. This was Blaik's only losing season at Army. In the Army–Navy game, Navy scored two touchdowns before Army even ran an offensive series.

== Roster ==
1951 Army Cadets football team roster
Players
Coaches
Offense

Pos.	#	Name	Class
HB		Tommy Bell	Fr
G		Leroy Lunn	So

Defense

Pos.	#	Name	Class

Special teams

Pos.	#	Name	Class

Head coach

- Earl Blaik

Coordinators/assistant coaches

Legend

- (C) Team captain
- (S) Suspended
- (I) Ineligible
- Injured
- Redshirt

== See also ==
- William & Mary scandal of 1951: a transcript-altering controversy at the College of William & Mary involving the school's football and men's basketball programs
