= George Ackerman =

George Ackerman may refer to:

- George W. Ackerman (1884–1962), American government photographer
- George Ackerman (American football) (1905–1971), American football and baseball coach
