= 1951 Trenton State Lions football team =

American college football season

1951 Trenton State Lions football
- Conference: Independent
- Record: 6–0
- Head coach: George Ackerman (6th season)

1951 Eastern college football independents records
	Conf.			Overall
Team	W	L	T	W		L		T
Bucknell		–		9	–	0	–	0
No. 6 Princeton		–		9	–	0	–	0
Susquehanna		–		6	–	0	–	0
Trenton State		–		6	–	0	–	0
Northeastern		–		6	–	0	–	1
No. 19 Holy Cross		–		8	–	2	–	0
Carnegie Tech		–		6	–	2	–	0
Hofstra		–		6	–	2	–	1
Cornell		–		6	–	3	–	0
No. 16 Boston University		–		6	–	4	–	0
Temple		–		6	–	4	–	0
Columbia		–		5	–	3	–	0
Villanova		–		5	–	3	–	0
Fordham		–		5	–	4	–	0
Franklin & Marshall		–		5	–	4	–	0
Penn		–		5	–	4	–	0
Penn State		–		5	–	4	–	0
Syracuse		–		5	–	4	–	0
Buffalo		–		4	–	4	–	0
Colgate		–		4	–	5	–	0
Dartmouth		–		4	–	5	–	0
Drexel		–		3	–	4	–	0
Harvard		–		3	–	5	–	1
Boston College		–		3	–	6	–	0
Yale		–		2	–	5	–	2
Pittsburgh		–		3	–	7	–	0
Geneva		–		2	–	5	–	0
Army		–		2	–	7	–	0
Brown		–		2	–	7	–	0
NYU		–		1	–	7	–	0
Tufts		–		0	–	7	–	2
Rankings from AP Poll

The 1951 Trenton State Lions football team was an American football team that represented New Jersey State Teachers College at Trenton, commonly known as Trenton State Teachers College (now known as The College of New Jersey) as an independent during the 1951 college football season. In their sixth year under head coach George Ackerman, the Lions compiled a perfect 6–0 record, held every opponent to seven points or less, and outscored all opponents by a total of 174 to 26. It was the first undefeated season in Trenton State history and came on the heels of an 11-year, 45-game losing streak that ended in 1949.

The team's leaders included running back Mike Angelotti and quarterback Tibbet Csic.

The team played its home games in Trenton, New Jersey.

== Schedule ==
Date	Opponent	Site	Result	Source
September 29	at King's (PA)	Plains Memorial Stadium; Wilkes-Barre, Pennsylvania	W 20–7	
October 6	New Britain	Hillwood Lakes Field; Trenton, New Jersey	W 19–7	
October 13	at National Aggies	Doylestown, Pennsylvania	W 33–0	
October 20	at New York Aggies	Farmingdale, NY	W 47–0	
November 3	at Cheyney	Cheyney, PA	W 26–6	
November 8	Montclair State	Trenton, NJ	W 29–6	
