= 1951 Boston College Eagles football team =

American college football season

1951 Boston College Eagles football
- Conference: Independent
- Record: 3–6
- Head coach: Mike Holovak (1st season)
- Captain: Mike Roarke
- Home stadium: Braves Field

1951 Eastern college football independents records
	Conf.			Overall
Team	W	L	T	W		L		T
Bucknell		–		9	–	0	–	0
No. 6 Princeton		–		9	–	0	–	0
Susquehanna		–		6	–	0	–	0
Trenton State		–		6	–	0	–	0
Northeastern		–		6	–	0	–	1
No. 19 Holy Cross		–		8	–	2	–	0
Carnegie Tech		–		6	–	2	–	0
Hofstra		–		6	–	2	–	1
Cornell		–		6	–	3	–	0
No. 16 Boston University		–		6	–	4	–	0
Temple		–		6	–	4	–	0
Columbia		–		5	–	3	–	0
Villanova		–		5	–	3	–	0
Fordham		–		5	–	4	–	0
Franklin & Marshall		–		5	–	4	–	0
Penn		–		5	–	4	–	0
Penn State		–		5	–	4	–	0
Syracuse		–		5	–	4	–	0
Buffalo		–		4	–	4	–	0
Colgate		–		4	–	5	–	0
Dartmouth		–		4	–	5	–	0
Drexel		–		3	–	4	–	0
Harvard		–		3	–	5	–	1
Boston College		–		3	–	6	–	0
Yale		–		2	–	5	–	2
Pittsburgh		–		3	–	7	–	0
Geneva		–		2	–	5	–	0
Army		–		2	–	7	–	0
Brown		–		2	–	7	–	0
NYU		–		1	–	7	–	0
Tufts		–		0	–	7	–	2
Rankings from AP Poll

The 1951 Boston College Eagles football team represented Boston College as an independent during the 1951 college football season. Led by first-year head coach Mike Holovak, the Eagles compiled a record of 3–6. The team was ranked at No. 85 in the 1951 Litkenhous Ratings.

Boston College played home games at Braves Field in Boston, Massachusetts.

== Schedule ==
Date	Opponent	Site	Result	Attendance	Source
September 21	Wake Forest	Braves Field; Boston, MA	L 6–20	20,587	
October 5	at Ole Miss	Crump Stadium; Memphis, TN	L 7–34	9,000	
October 12	Fordham	Braves Field; Boston, MA	L 19–35	16,763	
October 19	Detroit	Braves Field; Boston, MA	L 13–19	10,123	
October 27	at Georgia	Sanford Stadium; Athens, GA	L 28–35	10,000	
November 2	Richmond	Braves Field; Boston, MA	W 21–7	5,514	
November 10	at Clemson	Memorial Stadium; Clemson, SC (rivalry)	L 2–21	14,000	
November 17	Villanova	Braves Field; Boston, MA	W 20–13	7,782	
December 1	No. 19 Holy Cross	Braves Field; Boston, MA (rivalry)	W 19–14	41,000	
Rankings from AP Poll released prior to the game
