= 1951 Brown Bears football team =

American college football season

1951 Brown Bears football
- Conference: Independent
- Record: 2–7
- Head coach: Alva Kelley (1st season)
- Captains: J. A. Martland; J. J. Pietro
- Home stadium: Brown Stadium

1951 Eastern college football independents records
| | Conf. | | | Overall |
| Team | W | L | T | W | | L | | T |
|---|---|---|---|---|---|---|---|---|
| Bucknell | | – | | 9 | – | 0 | – | 0 |
| No. 6 Princeton | | – | | 9 | – | 0 | – | 0 |
| Susquehanna | | – | | 6 | – | 0 | – | 0 |
| Trenton State | | – | | 6 | – | 0 | – | 0 |
| Northeastern | | – | | 6 | – | 0 | – | 1 |
| No. 19 Holy Cross | | – | | 8 | – | 2 | – | 0 |
| Carnegie Tech | | – | | 6 | – | 2 | – | 0 |
| Hofstra | | – | | 6 | – | 2 | – | 1 |
| Cornell | | – | | 6 | – | 3 | – | 0 |
| No. 16 Boston University | | – | | 6 | – | 4 | – | 0 |
| Temple | | – | | 6 | – | 4 | – | 0 |
| Columbia | | – | | 5 | – | 3 | – | 0 |
| Villanova | | – | | 5 | – | 3 | – | 0 |
| Fordham | | – | | 5 | – | 4 | – | 0 |
| Franklin & Marshall | | – | | 5 | – | 4 | – | 0 |
| Penn | | – | | 5 | – | 4 | – | 0 |
| Penn State | | – | | 5 | – | 4 | – | 0 |
| Syracuse | | – | | 5 | – | 4 | – | 0 |
| Buffalo | | – | | 4 | – | 4 | – | 0 |
| Colgate | | – | | 4 | – | 5 | – | 0 |
| Dartmouth | | – | | 4 | – | 5 | – | 0 |
| Drexel | | – | | 3 | – | 4 | – | 0 |
| Harvard | | – | | 3 | – | 5 | – | 1 |
| Boston College | | – | | 3 | – | 6 | – | 0 |
| Yale | | – | | 2 | – | 5 | – | 2 |
| Pittsburgh | | – | | 3 | – | 7 | – | 0 |
| Geneva | | – | | 2 | – | 5 | – | 0 |
| Army | | – | | 2 | – | 7 | – | 0 |
| Brown | | – | | 2 | – | 7 | – | 0 |
| NYU | | – | | 1 | – | 7 | – | 0 |
| Tufts | | – | | 0 | – | 7 | – | 2 |
Rankings from AP Poll

The 1951 Brown Bears football team represented Brown University during the 1951 college football season.

In their first season under head coach Alva Kelley, the Bears compiled a 2–7 record, and were outscored 222 to 124. J.A. Martland and J.J. Pietro were the team captains.

Brown played its home games at Brown Stadium in Providence, Rhode Island.

== Schedule ==
| Date | Opponent | Site | Result | Attendance | Source |
|---|---|---|---|---|---|
| September 29 | Temple | Brown Stadium; Providence, RI | L 14–20 | 8,500 | |
| October 6 | at Yale | Yale Bowl; New Haven, CT | W 14–13 | 35,000 | |
| October 13 | Rhode Island | Brown Stadium; Providence, RI (rivalry) | W 20–13 | 10,000 | |
| October 20 | Colgate^{†} | Brown Stadium; Providence, RI | L 14–32 | 10,000 | |
| October 27 | Holy Cross | Brown Stadium; Providence, RI | L 6–41 | 10,000 | |
| November 3 | at Princeton | Palmer Stadium; Princeton, NJ | L 0–12 | 21,000 | |
| November 10 | Rutgers | Brown Stadium; Providence, RI | L 21–28 | 5,000 | |
| November 17 | at Harvard | Harvard Stadium; Boston, MA | L 21–34 | 12,000 | |
| November 24 | at Columbia | Baker Field; New York, NY | L 14–29 | 10,000 | |
^{†}Homecoming
