= 1951 Buffalo Bulls football team =

American college football season

1951 Buffalo Bulls football
- Conference: Independent
- Record: 4–4
- Head coach: James B. Wilson (4th season)
- Captain: Ed Gicewicz
- Home stadium: Civic Stadium

1951 Eastern college football independents records
	Conf.			Overall
Team	W	L	T	W		L		T
Bucknell		–		9	–	0	–	0
No. 6 Princeton		–		9	–	0	–	0
Susquehanna		–		6	–	0	–	0
Trenton State		–		6	–	0	–	0
Northeastern		–		6	–	0	–	1
No. 19 Holy Cross		–		8	–	2	–	0
Carnegie Tech		–		6	–	2	–	0
Hofstra		–		6	–	2	–	1
Cornell		–		6	–	3	–	0
No. 16 Boston University		–		6	–	4	–	0
Temple		–		6	–	4	–	0
Columbia		–		5	–	3	–	0
Villanova		–		5	–	3	–	0
Fordham		–		5	–	4	–	0
Franklin & Marshall		–		5	–	4	–	0
Penn		–		5	–	4	–	0
Penn State		–		5	–	4	–	0
Syracuse		–		5	–	4	–	0
Buffalo		–		4	–	4	–	0
Colgate		–		4	–	5	–	0
Dartmouth		–		4	–	5	–	0
Drexel		–		3	–	4	–	0
Harvard		–		3	–	5	–	1
Boston College		–		3	–	6	–	0
Yale		–		2	–	5	–	2
Pittsburgh		–		3	–	7	–	0
Geneva		–		2	–	5	–	0
Army		–		2	–	7	–	0
Brown		–		2	–	7	–	0
NYU		–		1	–	7	–	0
Tufts		–		0	–	7	–	2
Rankings from AP Poll

The 1951 Buffalo Bulls football team was an American football team that represented the University of Buffalo as an independent during the 1951 college football season. In its fourth and final season under head coach James B. Wilson, the team compiled a 4–4 record. The team played its home games at Civic Stadium in Buffalo, New York.

== Schedule ==
Date	Opponent	Site	Result	Attendance	Source
September 21	Cortland	Civic Stadium; Buffalo, NY	W 13–0		
September 29	Colgate	Civic Stadium; Buffalo, NY	L 13–47	26,126	
October 5	Ohio Wesleyan	Civic Stadium; Buffalo, NY	L 0–21	3,300	
October 13	at Alfred	Alfred, NY	W 31–6		
October 20	at Bucknell	Memorial Stadium; Lewisburg, PA	L 32–62	6,500	
October 27	Connecticut	Civic Stadium; Buffalo, NY	W 20–6		
November 3	at Miami (OH)	Miami Field; Oxford, OH	L 7–27		
November 17	RPI	Civic Stadium; Buffalo, NY	W 34–14		

== After the season ==
=== NFL draft ===
The following Bull was selected in the National Football League draft following the season.

Round	Pick	Player	Position	NFL club
18	206	Les Molnar	Tackle	New York Yanks
