= 1951 Penn Quakers football team =

American college football season

1951 Penn Quakers football
- Conference: Independent
- Record: 5–4
- Head coach: George Munger (14th season)
- Captain: Harry Warren
- Home stadium: Franklin Field

1951 Eastern college football independents records
| | Conf. | | | Overall |
| Team | W | L | T | W | | L | | T |
|---|---|---|---|---|---|---|---|---|
| Bucknell | | – | | 9 | – | 0 | – | 0 |
| No. 6 Princeton | | – | | 9 | – | 0 | – | 0 |
| Susquehanna | | – | | 6 | – | 0 | – | 0 |
| Trenton State | | – | | 6 | – | 0 | – | 0 |
| Northeastern | | – | | 6 | – | 0 | – | 1 |
| No. 19 Holy Cross | | – | | 8 | – | 2 | – | 0 |
| Carnegie Tech | | – | | 6 | – | 2 | – | 0 |
| Hofstra | | – | | 6 | – | 2 | – | 1 |
| Cornell | | – | | 6 | – | 3 | – | 0 |
| No. 16 Boston University | | – | | 6 | – | 4 | – | 0 |
| Temple | | – | | 6 | – | 4 | – | 0 |
| Columbia | | – | | 5 | – | 3 | – | 0 |
| Villanova | | – | | 5 | – | 3 | – | 0 |
| Fordham | | – | | 5 | – | 4 | – | 0 |
| Franklin & Marshall | | – | | 5 | – | 4 | – | 0 |
| Penn | | – | | 5 | – | 4 | – | 0 |
| Penn State | | – | | 5 | – | 4 | – | 0 |
| Syracuse | | – | | 5 | – | 4 | – | 0 |
| Buffalo | | – | | 4 | – | 4 | – | 0 |
| Colgate | | – | | 4 | – | 5 | – | 0 |
| Dartmouth | | – | | 4 | – | 5 | – | 0 |
| Drexel | | – | | 3 | – | 4 | – | 0 |
| Harvard | | – | | 3 | – | 5 | – | 1 |
| Boston College | | – | | 3 | – | 6 | – | 0 |
| Yale | | – | | 2 | – | 5 | – | 2 |
| Pittsburgh | | – | | 3 | – | 7 | – | 0 |
| Geneva | | – | | 2 | – | 5 | – | 0 |
| Army | | – | | 2 | – | 7 | – | 0 |
| Brown | | – | | 2 | – | 7 | – | 0 |
| NYU | | – | | 1 | – | 7 | – | 0 |
| Tufts | | – | | 0 | – | 7 | – | 2 |
Rankings from AP Poll

The 1951 Penn Quakers football team was an American football team that represented the University of Pennsylvania during the 1951 college football season. In their 14th year under head coach George Munger, the Quakers compiled a 5–4 record and outscored opponents 121 to 117. Harry Warren was the team captain.

Penn played its home games at Franklin Field adjacent to the university's campus in Philadelphia, Pennsylvania.

== Schedule ==
| Date | Opponent | Site | Result | Attendance | Source |
|---|---|---|---|---|---|
| September 29 | No. 5 California | Franklin Field; Philadelphia, PA | L 0–35 | 60,000 | |
| October 6 | Dartmouth | Franklin Field; Philadelphia, PA | W 39–14 | 35,000 | |
| October 13 | No. 13 Princeton | Franklin Field; Philadelphia, PA (rivalry) | L 7–13 | 60,000 | |
| October 20 | Columbia | Franklin Field; Philadelphia, PA | W 28–13 | 40,000 | |
| October 27 | Navy | Franklin Field; Philadelphia, PA | W 14–0 | 61,000 | |
| November 3 | William & Mary | Franklin Field; Philadelphia, PA | L 12–20 | 12,801 | |
| November 10 | at No. 9 Wisconsin | Camp Randall Stadium; Madison, WI | L 7–16 | 45,000 | |
| November 17 | Army | Franklin Field; Philadelphia, PA | W 7–6 | 40,000 | |
| November 24 | Cornell | Franklin Field; Philadelphia, PA (rivalry) | W 7–0 | 40,000 | |
Rankings from AP Poll released prior to the game
