= 1951 Colgate Red Raiders football team =

American college football season

1951 Colgate Red Raiders football
- Conference: Independent
- Record: 4–5
- Head coach: Paul Bixler (5th season)
- Captain: William Owens
- Home stadium: Colgate Athletic Field

1951 Eastern college football independents records
| | Conf. | | | Overall |
| Team | W | L | T | W | | L | | T |
|---|---|---|---|---|---|---|---|---|
| Bucknell | | – | | 9 | – | 0 | – | 0 |
| No. 6 Princeton | | – | | 9 | – | 0 | – | 0 |
| Susquehanna | | – | | 6 | – | 0 | – | 0 |
| Trenton State | | – | | 6 | – | 0 | – | 0 |
| Northeastern | | – | | 6 | – | 0 | – | 1 |
| No. 19 Holy Cross | | – | | 8 | – | 2 | – | 0 |
| Carnegie Tech | | – | | 6 | – | 2 | – | 0 |
| Hofstra | | – | | 6 | – | 2 | – | 1 |
| Cornell | | – | | 6 | – | 3 | – | 0 |
| No. 16 Boston University | | – | | 6 | – | 4 | – | 0 |
| Temple | | – | | 6 | – | 4 | – | 0 |
| Columbia | | – | | 5 | – | 3 | – | 0 |
| Villanova | | – | | 5 | – | 3 | – | 0 |
| Fordham | | – | | 5 | – | 4 | – | 0 |
| Franklin & Marshall | | – | | 5 | – | 4 | – | 0 |
| Penn | | – | | 5 | – | 4 | – | 0 |
| Penn State | | – | | 5 | – | 4 | – | 0 |
| Syracuse | | – | | 5 | – | 4 | – | 0 |
| Buffalo | | – | | 4 | – | 4 | – | 0 |
| Colgate | | – | | 4 | – | 5 | – | 0 |
| Dartmouth | | – | | 4 | – | 5 | – | 0 |
| Drexel | | – | | 3 | – | 4 | – | 0 |
| Harvard | | – | | 3 | – | 5 | – | 1 |
| Boston College | | – | | 3 | – | 6 | – | 0 |
| Yale | | – | | 2 | – | 5 | – | 2 |
| Pittsburgh | | – | | 3 | – | 7 | – | 0 |
| Geneva | | – | | 2 | – | 5 | – | 0 |
| Army | | – | | 2 | – | 7 | – | 0 |
| Brown | | – | | 2 | – | 7 | – | 0 |
| NYU | | – | | 1 | – | 7 | – | 0 |
| Tufts | | – | | 0 | – | 7 | – | 2 |
Rankings from AP Poll

The 1951 Colgate Red Raiders football team was an American football team that represented Colgate University as an independent during the 1951 college football season. In its fifth and final season under head coach Paul Bixler, the team compiled a 4–5 record and was outscored by a total of 187 to 184. William Owens was the team captain.

Colgate was ranked at No. 94 in the 1951 Litkenhous Ratings.

The team played its home games at Colgate Athletic Field in Hamilton, New York.

== Schedule ==
| Date | Opponent | Site | Result | Attendance | Source |
|---|---|---|---|---|---|
| September 29 | at Buffalo | Civic Stadium; Buffalo, NY | W 47–13 | 26,126 | |
| October 6 | Cornell | Colgate Athletic Field; Hamilton, NY (rivalry) | L 18–41 | 12,000 | |
| October 13 | at Western Reserve | Clarke Field; Cleveland, OH | W 28–7 | 6,500 | |
| October 20 | at Brown | Brown Stadium; Providence, RI | W 32–14 | 10,000 | |
| October 27 | at Yale | Yale Bowl; New Haven, CT | L 7–27 | 20,000 | |
| November 3 | at Holy Cross | Fitton Field; Worcester, MA | L 6–34 | 5,000 | |
| November 10 | Bucknell | Colgate Athletic Field; Hamilton, NY | L 20–21 | | |
| November 17 | at Syracuse | Archbold Stadium; Syracuse, NY (rivalry) | L 0–9 | 34,000 | |
| November 24 | at Rutgers | Rutgers Stadium; Piscataway, NJ | W 26–21 | 8,000 | |
