= Code Breakers (film) =

- Genre: Drama
- Based on: A Return to Glory by Bill McWilliams
- Written by: G. Ross Parker
- Directed by: Rod Holcomb
- Starring: Zachery Ty Bryan; Jeff Roop; Jake Busey; Corey Sevier; Theo Rossi; Robin Dunne; Adam Grimes; Jude Ciccolella; Dan Petronijevic; Richard Zeppieri; Scott Glenn
- Music by: Anthony Marinelli
- Country of origin: United States
- Original language: English

Production
- Executive producer: Orly Adelson
- Producer: Frank Siracusa
- Cinematography: Thomas Del Ruth
- Editor: Michael Brown
- Running time: 128 minutes
- Production company: Orly Adelson Productions

Original release
- Network: ESPN
- Release: December 10, 2005

Code Breakers is a 2005 American sports drama television film directed by Rod Holcomb and written by G. Ross Parker, based on the 2000 non-fiction book A Return to Glory by Bill McWilliams. The film chronicles the real-life 1951 cheating scandal at the United States Military Academy, and the impact on its football team. It stars Zachery Ty Bryan, Jeff Roop, Jake Busey, Corey Sevier, Theo Rossi, Robin Dunne, Adam Grimes, Jude Ciccolella, Dan Petronijevic, Richard Zeppieri, and Scott Glenn as Coach Earl "Red" Blaik.

The film aired on ESPN on December 10, 2005.

== Synopsis ==
The film chronicles the 1951 cheating scandal at West Point and its impact on Army's football team, which was forced to dismiss virtually its entire squad. The film begins going into the 1950 Army–Navy Game, the Cadets football team was heavily favored, yet went on to lose to a weak Midshipmen squad, 14–2. The Academy and football team were then thrown into a scandal when 90 cadets, including 37 lettering football players, resigned in a cheating scandal which broke the Academy's Honor Code. The film follows Brian Nolan, a cadet who is led to a ring of cheaters when he is need of academic help to pass. A serious piece of the film involves the relationship of Coach Blaik and his son Bob, one of the cadets responsible for cheating.

== Cast ==
- Zachery Ty Bryan as Brian Nolan
- Jeff Roop as George Holbrook
- Jake Busey as Straub
- Corey Sevier as Bob Blaik
- Theo Rossi as Desantis
- Robin Dunne as Trager
- Adam Grimes as Culpepper
- Jude Ciccolella as Commandant Harkins
- Dan Petronijevic as Corely
- Richard Zeppieri as Vince Lombardi
- Scott Glenn as Earl "Red" Blaik
- Shane Daly as Doug Kenna
- Damon Runyan as Firstie
- Jonathan Walker as Bellingham
- Sarah Gadon as Julia Nolan
- Jennifer Dale as Mrs. Nolan

== Production ==
Filming took place in Toronto. A principal shooting location was Victoria College. Cinematographer Thomas Del Ruth used the 1950 film The West Point Story, directed by his father Roy Del Ruth, as a template in recreating West Point in the 1950s.

== Release ==
The film aired on December 10, 2005 at 9 pm ET on ESPN and ESPN HD.

== See also ==
- List of American football films
