= 1951 Northeastern Huskies football team =

American college football season

1951 Northeastern Huskies football
- Conference: Independent
- Record: 6–0–1
- Head coach: Joe Zabilski (4th season)
- Captain: Sal Lombardo
- Home stadium: Kent Street Field

1951 Eastern college football independents records
	Conf.			Overall
Team	W	L	T	W		L		T
Bucknell		–		9	–	0	–	0
No. 6 Princeton		–		9	–	0	–	0
Susquehanna		–		6	–	0	–	0
Trenton State		–		6	–	0	–	0
Northeastern		–		6	–	0	–	1
No. 19 Holy Cross		–		8	–	2	–	0
Carnegie Tech		–		6	–	2	–	0
Hofstra		–		6	–	2	–	1
Cornell		–		6	–	3	–	0
No. 16 Boston University		–		6	–	4	–	0
Temple		–		6	–	4	–	0
Columbia		–		5	–	3	–	0
Villanova		–		5	–	3	–	0
Fordham		–		5	–	4	–	0
Franklin & Marshall		–		5	–	4	–	0
Penn		–		5	–	4	–	0
Penn State		–		5	–	4	–	0
Syracuse		–		5	–	4	–	0
Buffalo		–		4	–	4	–	0
Colgate		–		4	–	5	–	0
Dartmouth		–		4	–	5	–	0
Drexel		–		3	–	4	–	0
Harvard		–		3	–	5	–	1
Boston College		–		3	–	6	–	0
Yale		–		2	–	5	–	2
Pittsburgh		–		3	–	7	–	0
Geneva		–		2	–	5	–	0
Army		–		2	–	7	–	0
Brown		–		2	–	7	–	0
NYU		–		1	–	7	–	0
Tufts		–		0	–	7	–	2
Rankings from AP Poll

The 1951 Northeastern Huskies football team represented Northeastern University during the 1951 college football season. It was the program's 16th season and they finished with an undefeated record of 6–0–1. Their head coach was Joe Zabilski and their captain was Sal Lombardo. The quarterback was John Connelly.

== Schedule ==
Date	Opponent	Site	Result
September 22	Rhode Island	Kent Street Field; Brookline, MA	W 21–0
September 29	at American International	Springfield, MA	W 27–20
October 6	Tufts	Kent Street Field; Brookline, MA	W 39–7
October 13	at Colby	Waterville, ME	W 33–0
October 20	Bates	Kent Street Field; Brookline, MA	W 41–13
October 27	UMass	Kent Street Field; Brookline, MA	W 20–7
November 3	at Coast Guard	New London, CT	T 13–13
