= 1951 Fordham Rams football team =

American college football season

1951 Fordham Rams football
- Conference: Independent
- Record: 5–4
- Head coach: Ed Danowski (6th season)
- Captain: Chris Campbell
- Home stadium: Triborough Stadium

1951 Eastern college football independents records
	Conf.			Overall
Team	W	L	T	W		L		T
Bucknell		–		9	–	0	–	0
No. 6 Princeton		–		9	–	0	–	0
Susquehanna		–		6	–	0	–	0
Trenton State		–		6	–	0	–	0
Northeastern		–		6	–	0	–	1
No. 19 Holy Cross		–		8	–	2	–	0
Carnegie Tech		–		6	–	2	–	0
Hofstra		–		6	–	2	–	1
Cornell		–		6	–	3	–	0
No. 16 Boston University		–		6	–	4	–	0
Temple		–		6	–	4	–	0
Columbia		–		5	–	3	–	0
Villanova		–		5	–	3	–	0
Fordham		–		5	–	4	–	0
Franklin & Marshall		–		5	–	4	–	0
Penn		–		5	–	4	–	0
Penn State		–		5	–	4	–	0
Syracuse		–		5	–	4	–	0
Buffalo		–		4	–	4	–	0
Colgate		–		4	–	5	–	0
Dartmouth		–		4	–	5	–	0
Drexel		–		3	–	4	–	0
Harvard		–		3	–	5	–	1
Boston College		–		3	–	6	–	0
Yale		–		2	–	5	–	2
Pittsburgh		–		3	–	7	–	0
Geneva		–		2	–	5	–	0
Army		–		2	–	7	–	0
Brown		–		2	–	7	–	0
NYU		–		1	–	7	–	0
Tufts		–		0	–	7	–	2
Rankings from AP Poll

The 1951 Fordham Rams football team represented Fordham University as an independent during the 1951 college football season. In their sixth year under head coach Ed Danowski, the Rams compiled a 5–4 record. Chris Campbell was the team captain. The Rams were outscored 232 to 183. The team was ranked at No. 72a in the 1951 Litkenhous Ratings.

Fordham played two games at Triborough Stadium on Randalls Island in Manhattan, New York City, and the rest of its schedule on the road.

== Schedule ==
Date	Opponent	Site	Result	Attendance	Source
September 22	at Missouri	Memorial Stadium; Columbia, MO	W 34–20	18,000	
September 29	at Dartmouth	Memorial Field; Hanover, NH	W 14–6	11,000	
October 6	at Holy Cross	Fitton Field; Worcester, MA	L 20–54	23,000	
October 12	at Boston College	Braves Field; Boston, MA	W 35–19	15,600	
October 20	San Francisco	Triborough Stadium; New York, NY	L 26–32	15,250	
October 28	at Syracuse	Archbold Stadium; Syracuse, NY	L 20–33	15,000	
November 3	at Rutgers	Rutgers Stadium; Piscataway, NJ	L 7–13	5,000	
November 18	at Temple	Temple Stadium; Philadelphia, PA	W 35–6	7,500	
November 24	vs. NYU	Triborough Stadium; New York, NY	W 41–0	12,000	
