= 1951 Bucknell Bison football team =

American college football season

1951 Bucknell Bison football
- Conference: Independent
- Record: 9–0
- Head coach: Harry Lawrence (5th season)
- Captains: Robert R. Albert Jr.; George B. Young
- Home stadium: Memorial Stadium

1951 Eastern college football independents records
	Conf.			Overall
Team	W	L	T	W		L		T
Bucknell		–		9	–	0	–	0
No. 6 Princeton		–		9	–	0	–	0
Susquehanna		–		6	–	0	–	0
Trenton State		–		6	–	0	–	0
Northeastern		–		6	–	0	–	1
No. 19 Holy Cross		–		8	–	2	–	0
Carnegie Tech		–		6	–	2	–	0
Hofstra		–		6	–	2	–	1
Cornell		–		6	–	3	–	0
No. 16 Boston University		–		6	–	4	–	0
Temple		–		6	–	4	–	0
Columbia		–		5	–	3	–	0
Villanova		–		5	–	3	–	0
Fordham		–		5	–	4	–	0
Franklin & Marshall		–		5	–	4	–	0
Penn		–		5	–	4	–	0
Penn State		–		5	–	4	–	0
Syracuse		–		5	–	4	–	0
Buffalo		–		4	–	4	–	0
Colgate		–		4	–	5	–	0
Dartmouth		–		4	–	5	–	0
Drexel		–		3	–	4	–	0
Harvard		–		3	–	5	–	1
Boston College		–		3	–	6	–	0
Yale		–		2	–	5	–	2
Pittsburgh		–		3	–	7	–	0
Geneva		–		2	–	5	–	0
Army		–		2	–	7	–	0
Brown		–		2	–	7	–	0
NYU		–		1	–	7	–	0
Tufts		–		0	–	7	–	2
Rankings from AP Poll

The 1951 Bucknell Bison football team was an American football team that represented Bucknell University as an independent during the 1951 college football season.

In its fifth season under head coach Harry Lawrence, the team compiled a 9–0 record. Robert R. Albert Jr. and George B. Young were the team captains. The team was ranked at No. 64 in the 1951 Litkenhous Ratings.

The team played its home games at Memorial Stadium on the university campus in Lewisburg, Pennsylvania.

== Schedule ==
Date	Opponent	Site	Result	Attendance	Source
September 22	vs. Gettysburg	Hershey Stadium; Hershey, PA (Rotary Bowl)	W 41–7	12,000	
September 29	Muhlenberg	Memorial Stadium; Lewisburg, PA	W 54–19	6,500	
October 6	at Lehigh	Taylor Stadium; Bethlehem, PA	W 47–7	8,000	
October 13	at Kent State	Memorial Stadium; Kent, OH	W 13–7		
October 20	Buffalo	Memorial Stadium; Lewisburg, PA	W 62–32	6,500	
October 27	at Lafayette	Fisher Field; Easton, PA	W 40–21	5,000	
November 3	Temple^{†}	Memorial Stadium; Lewisburg, PA	W 28–7	10,000	
November 10	at Colgate	Colgate Athletic Field; Hamilton, NY	W 21–20		
November 17	Delaware	Memorial Stadium; Lewisburg, PA	W 33–6	7,000	
^{†}Homecoming
