= 1951 Syracuse Orangemen football team =

American college football season

1951 Syracuse Orangemen football
- Conference: Independent
- Record: 5–4
- Head coach: Ben Schwartzwalder (3rd season)
- Captains: Ed Dobrowolski; John Donati
- Home stadium: Archbold Stadium

1951 Eastern college football independents records
	Conf.			Overall
Team	W	L	T	W		L		T
Bucknell		–		9	–	0	–	0
No. 6 Princeton		–		9	–	0	–	0
Susquehanna		–		6	–	0	–	0
Trenton State		–		6	–	0	–	0
Northeastern		–		6	–	0	–	1
No. 19 Holy Cross		–		8	–	2	–	0
Carnegie Tech		–		6	–	2	–	0
Hofstra		–		6	–	2	–	1
Cornell		–		6	–	3	–	0
No. 16 Boston University		–		6	–	4	–	0
Temple		–		6	–	4	–	0
Columbia		–		5	–	3	–	0
Villanova		–		5	–	3	–	0
Fordham		–		5	–	4	–	0
Franklin & Marshall		–		5	–	4	–	0
Penn		–		5	–	4	–	0
Penn State		–		5	–	4	–	0
Syracuse		–		5	–	4	–	0
Buffalo		–		4	–	4	–	0
Colgate		–		4	–	5	–	0
Dartmouth		–		4	–	5	–	0
Drexel		–		3	–	4	–	0
Harvard		–		3	–	5	–	1
Boston College		–		3	–	6	–	0
Yale		–		2	–	5	–	2
Pittsburgh		–		3	–	7	–	0
Geneva		–		2	–	5	–	0
Army		–		2	–	7	–	0
Brown		–		2	–	7	–	0
NYU		–		1	–	7	–	0
Tufts		–		0	–	7	–	2
Rankings from AP Poll

The 1951 Syracuse Orangemen football team represented Syracuse University as an independent during the 1951 college football season. The Orangemen were led by third-year head coach Ben Schwartzwalder and played their home games at Archbold Stadium in Syracuse, New York. Syracuse finished the season with a 5–4 record and were not invited to a bowl game. The team was ranked at No. 65 in the 1951 Litkenhous Ratings.

== Schedule ==
Date	Opponent	Site	Result	Attendance	Source
September 21	Temple	Archbold Stadium; Syracuse, NY	W 19–0	17,000	
September 29	at No. 20 Cornell	Schoellkopf Field; Ithaca, NY	L 14–21	25,000	
October 6	Lafayette	Archbold Stadium; Syracuse, NY	W 46–0	13,000	
October 13	No. 7 Illinois	Archbold Stadium; Syracuse, NY	L 20–41	27,000	
October 20	at Dartmouth	Memorial Field; Hanover, NH	L 0–14	11,000	
October 27	Fordham	Archbold Stadium; Syracuse, NY	W 33–20	15,000	
November 10	at Penn State	New Beaver Field; University Park, PA (rivalry)	L 13–32	15,000	
November 17	Colgate	Archbold Stadium; Syracuse, NY (rivalry)	W 9–0	34,000	
November 24	at Boston University	Fenway Park; Boston, MA	W 26–19	10,148	
Rankings from AP Poll released prior to the game
