= Clipper Smith (American football, born 1898) =

American sports coach, athletics administrator (1898–1984)

Biographical details
- Born: October 15, 1898; Manteno, Illinois, U.S.
- Died: March 17, 1984 (aged 85); Laguna Beach, California, U.S.

Playing career

Football
- 1917–1920: Notre Dame
- Position: Guard

Coaching career (HC unless noted)

Football
- 1921–1924: Columbia (OR)
- 1925–1928: Gonzaga
- 1929–1935: Santa Clara
- 1936–1942: Villanova
- 1944: Cherry Point Marines
- 1946: San Francisco
- 1947–1948: Boston Yanks
- 1949–1951: Lafayette

Basketball
- 1922–1924: Columbia (OR)
- 1925–1929: Gonzaga

Baseball
- 1926: Gonzaga

Administrative career (AD unless noted)
- 1925–1929: Gonzaga

Head coaching record
- Overall: 7–16–1 (NFL); 73–75 (college basketball); 4–11 (college baseball)
- Bowls: 1–0–1

Maurice J. "Clipper" Smith (October 15, 1898 – March 17, 1984) was an American football player and coach of football, basketball, and baseball. He served as the head football coach at Gonzaga University (1925–1928), Santa Clara University (1929–1935), Villanova College—now known as Villanova University (1936–1942), the University of San Francisco (1946), and Lafayette College (1949–1951). Smith was also the head coach of the National Football League's Boston Yanks from 1947 to 1948, tallying a mark of 7–16–1. In addition, he was the head basketball coach at Gonzaga from 1925 to 1929 and the head baseball coach at the school for one season in 1926, notching a record of 4–11.

Smith died on March 17, 1984, at his home in Laguna Beach, California.

== Head coaching record ==
=== College football ===
Year	Team	Overall	Conference	Standing	Bowl/playoffs	AP^{#}
Gonzaga Bulldogs (Northwest Conference) (1925)
1925	Gonzaga	7–2–2	2–1–2	3rd		
Gonzaga Bulldogs (Independent) (1926–1928)
1926	Gonzaga	5–2–1				
1927	Gonzaga	5–3–1				
1928	Gonzaga	6–2–1				
Gonzaga:		23–9–5	2–1–2			
Santa Clara Missionites / Broncos (Independent) (1929–1935)
1929	Santa Clara	5–3				
1930	Santa Clara	5–3–1				
1931	Santa Clara	5–4–1				
1932	Santa Clara	6–3				
1933	Santa Clara	6–2–1			W New Year's Classic	
1934	Santa Clara	7–2–1				
1935	Santa Clara	3–6				
Santa Clara:		37–23–4				
Villanova Wildcats (Independent) (1936–1942)
1936	Villanova	7–2–1			T Bacardi	
1937	Villanova	8–0–1				6
1938	Villanova	8–0–1				18
1939	Villanova	6–2				
1940	Villanova	4–5				
1941	Villanova	4–4				
1942	Villanova	4–4				
Villanova:		41–17–3				
Cherry Point Marines Flying Leathernecks (Independent) (1944)
1944	Cherry Point Marines	3–6				
Cherry Point Marines:		3–6				
San Francisco Dons (Independent) (1946)
1946	San Francisco	3–6				
San Francisco:		3–6				
Lafayette Leopards (Middle Three Conference) (1949–1951)
1949	Lafayette	2–6	1–1	2nd		
1950	Lafayette	1–8	0–2	3rd		
1951	Lafayette	1–7	0–2	3rd		
Lafayette:		4–21	1–5			
Total:						
^{#}Rankings from final AP Poll.
