= 1951 Drexel Dragons football team =

American college football team

1951 Drexel Dragons football
- Conference: Independent
- Record: 3–4
- Head coach: Eddie Allen (2nd season)
- Captains: Tom Stazak; Kim Billings
- Home stadium: Drexel Field

1951 Eastern college football independents records
	Conf.			Overall
Team	W	L	T	W		L		T
Bucknell		–		9	–	0	–	0
No. 6 Princeton		–		9	–	0	–	0
Susquehanna		–		6	–	0	–	0
Trenton State		–		6	–	0	–	0
Northeastern		–		6	–	0	–	1
No. 19 Holy Cross		–		8	–	2	–	0
Carnegie Tech		–		6	–	2	–	0
Hofstra		–		6	–	2	–	1
Cornell		–		6	–	3	–	0
No. 16 Boston University		–		6	–	4	–	0
Temple		–		6	–	4	–	0
Columbia		–		5	–	3	–	0
Villanova		–		5	–	3	–	0
Fordham		–		5	–	4	–	0
Franklin & Marshall		–		5	–	4	–	0
Penn		–		5	–	4	–	0
Penn State		–		5	–	4	–	0
Syracuse		–		5	–	4	–	0
Buffalo		–		4	–	4	–	0
Colgate		–		4	–	5	–	0
Dartmouth		–		4	–	5	–	0
Drexel		–		3	–	4	–	0
Harvard		–		3	–	5	–	1
Boston College		–		3	–	6	–	0
Yale		–		2	–	5	–	2
Pittsburgh		–		3	–	7	–	0
Geneva		–		2	–	5	–	0
Army		–		2	–	7	–	0
Brown		–		2	–	7	–	0
NYU		–		1	–	7	–	0
Tufts		–		0	–	7	–	2
Rankings from AP Poll

The 1951 Drexel Dragons football team represented the Drexel Institute of Technology (renamed Drexel University in 1970) as an independent during the 1951 college football season. Eddie Allen was the team's head coach.

== Schedule ==
Date	Time	Opponent	Site	Result	Attendance	Source
September 29		Ursinus	Drexel Field; Philadelphia, PA	W 14–13		
October 6		Gettysburg	Gettysburg, PA	L 0–21	3,500	
October 20		at Pennsylvania Military	PMC Stadium; Chester, PA	W 16–0		
October 27		Dickinson	Drexel Field; Philadelphia, PA	L 8–13		
November 3		at Western Maryland	Hoffa Field; Westminster, MD	L 0–6		
November 10	1:30 pm	Swarthmore^{†}	Drexel Field; Philadelphia, PA	W 35–6		
November 17	1:30 pm	at West Chester	Wayne Field; West Chester, PA	L 0–13		
^{†}Homecoming; All times are in Eastern time

== Roster ==
1951 Drexel Dragons football team roster
Players
Coaches
Offense

Pos.	#	Name	Class
TE		Fred Haid
OT		Evan Adams
G	32	Carl Bauer
C	18	Frank Fogarty
G		Tom Grindler
OT	43	Kim Billings (C)
TE	27	Dick Spahr
HB		Archie Gross	Jr
HB	15	Joe Bigatel
FB	29	Art Fischer
QB		Gene Hug
TE	13	Tommy Lawler
TE		Asa Colson
OT		Dick Bjorklund
G	45	Dick Yasky
G, DE		Fred Ulmer
C		Ted Rubin
C		Paul Von Zech
G		Jim Hart
G		Ted Pettros
OT		Bob Duffield
OT		Chmielewski
TE	31	Leo Hayes	So
TE		Paul Reibrick
HB		Mike Di Venanzio
HB	19	Hank Vaders
HB		Tom Grebis	So
HB		Joe Haenn
FB		Tom Kolongowski
FB		John Dooney
FB	38	Tom Stazak (C)
QB		Auggie Campiglia
QB		George Meyers	Fr

Defense

Pos.	#	Name	Class

Special teams

Pos.	#	Name	Class

Head coach

- Eddie Allen (Penn)

Coordinators/assistant coaches

- Tom Miller
- Jack Hinkle (Syracuse)

Legend

- (C) Team captain
- (S) Suspended
- (I) Ineligible
- Injured
- Redshirt
