= 1951 Harvard Crimson football team =

American college football season

1951 Harvard Crimson football
- Conference: Independent
- Record: 3–5–1
- Head coach: Lloyd Jordan (2nd season)
- Captains: Carroll M. Lowenstein; Warren D. Wylie
- Home stadium: Harvard Stadium

1951 Eastern college football independents records
	Conf.			Overall
Team	W	L	T	W		L		T
Bucknell		–		9	–	0	–	0
No. 6 Princeton		–		9	–	0	–	0
Susquehanna		–		6	–	0	–	0
Trenton State		–		6	–	0	–	0
Northeastern		–		6	–	0	–	1
No. 19 Holy Cross		–		8	–	2	–	0
Carnegie Tech		–		6	–	2	–	0
Hofstra		–		6	–	2	–	1
Cornell		–		6	–	3	–	0
No. 16 Boston University		–		6	–	4	–	0
Temple		–		6	–	4	–	0
Columbia		–		5	–	3	–	0
Villanova		–		5	–	3	–	0
Fordham		–		5	–	4	–	0
Franklin & Marshall		–		5	–	4	–	0
Penn		–		5	–	4	–	0
Penn State		–		5	–	4	–	0
Syracuse		–		5	–	4	–	0
Buffalo		–		4	–	4	–	0
Colgate		–		4	–	5	–	0
Dartmouth		–		4	–	5	–	0
Drexel		–		3	–	4	–	0
Harvard		–		3	–	5	–	1
Boston College		–		3	–	6	–	0
Yale		–		2	–	5	–	2
Pittsburgh		–		3	–	7	–	0
Geneva		–		2	–	5	–	0
Army		–		2	–	7	–	0
Brown		–		2	–	7	–	0
NYU		–		1	–	7	–	0
Tufts		–		0	–	7	–	2
Rankings from AP Poll

The 1951 Harvard Crimson football team was an American football team that represented Harvard University as an independent during the 1951 college football season. In their second year under head coach Lloyd Jordan, the Crimson compiled a 3–5–1 record and were outscored 266 to 143. Carroll M. Lowenstein and Warren D. Wylie were the team captains.

Harvard played its home games at Harvard Stadium in the Allston neighborhood of Boston, Massachusetts.

== Schedule ==
Date	Opponent	Site	Result	Attendance	Source
September 22	Springfield	Harvard Stadium; Boston, MA	W 21–13	10,000	
September 29	Holy Cross	Harvard Stadium; Boston, MA	L 6–33	24,000	
October 6	at Columbia	Baker Field; New York, NY	L 0–35	15,000	
October 13	at No. 17 Cornell	Schoellkopf Field; Ithaca, NY	L 6–42	20,000	
October 20	Army	Harvard Stadium; Boston, MA	W 22–21	14,000	
October 27	Dartmouth	Harvard Stadium; Boston, MA (rivalry)	L 20–26	20,000	
November 10	No. 4 Princeton	Harvard Stadium; Boston, MA (rivalry)	L 13–54	22,000	
November 17	Brown	Harvard Stadium; Boston, MA	W 34–21	12,000	
November 24	at Yale	Yale Bowl; New Haven, CT (The Game)	T 21–21	43,000	
Rankings from AP Poll released prior to the game
