= 1951 Cornell Big Red football team =

American college football season

1951 Cornell Big Red football
- Conference: Independent
- Record: 6–3
- Head coach: George K. James (5th season)
- Captain: Vic Pujo
- Home stadium: Schoellkopf Field

1951 Eastern college football independents records
	Conf.			Overall
Team	W	L	T	W		L		T
Bucknell		–		9	–	0	–	0
No. 6 Princeton		–		9	–	0	–	0
Susquehanna		–		6	–	0	–	0
Trenton State		–		6	–	0	–	0
Northeastern		–		6	–	0	–	1
No. 19 Holy Cross		–		8	–	2	–	0
Carnegie Tech		–		6	–	2	–	0
Hofstra		–		6	–	2	–	1
Cornell		–		6	–	3	–	0
No. 16 Boston University		–		6	–	4	–	0
Temple		–		6	–	4	–	0
Columbia		–		5	–	3	–	0
Villanova		–		5	–	3	–	0
Fordham		–		5	–	4	–	0
Franklin & Marshall		–		5	–	4	–	0
Penn		–		5	–	4	–	0
Penn State		–		5	–	4	–	0
Syracuse		–		5	–	4	–	0
Buffalo		–		4	–	4	–	0
Colgate		–		4	–	5	–	0
Dartmouth		–		4	–	5	–	0
Drexel		–		3	–	4	–	0
Harvard		–		3	–	5	–	1
Boston College		–		3	–	6	–	0
Yale		–		2	–	5	–	2
Pittsburgh		–		3	–	7	–	0
Geneva		–		2	–	5	–	0
Army		–		2	–	7	–	0
Brown		–		2	–	7	–	0
NYU		–		1	–	7	–	0
Tufts		–		0	–	7	–	2
Rankings from AP Poll

The 1951 Cornell Big Red football team was an American football team that represented Cornell University as an independent during the 1951 college football season. In its fifth season under head coach George K. James, the team compiled a 6–3 record and outscored its opponents 207 to 139. Vic Pujo was the team captain.

Cornell played its home games at Schoellkopf Field in Ithaca, New York.

== Schedule ==
Date	Opponent	Rank	Site	Result	Attendance	Source
September 29	Syracuse	No. 20	Schoellkopf Field; Ithaca, NY	W 21–14	25,000	
October 6	at Colgate		Colgate Athletic Field; Hamilton, NY (rivalry)	W 41–18	12,000	
October 13	Harvard	No. 17	Schoellkopf Field; Ithaca, NY	W 42–6	20,000	
October 20	at Yale	No. 14	Yale Bowl; New Haven, CT	W 27–0	30,000	
October 27	at No. 8 Princeton	No. 12	Palmer Stadium; Princeton, NJ	L 15–53	49,000	
November 3	Columbia		Schoellkopf Field; Ithaca, NY (rivalry)	L 20–21	21,000	
November 10	Michigan		Schoellkopf Field; Ithaca, NY	W 20–7	35,300	
November 17	at Dartmouth		Memorial Field; Hanover, NH (rivalry)	W 21–13	14,000	
November 24	at Penn		Franklin Field; Philadelphia, PA (rivalry)	L 0–7	40,000	
Rankings from AP Poll released prior to the game
