= 1951 Susquehanna Crusaders football team =

American college football season

1951 Susquehanna Crusaders football
- Conference: Independent
- Record: 6–0
- Head coach: Amos Alonzo Stagg Jr. (17th season)

1951 Eastern college football independents records
| | Conf. | | | Overall |
| Team | W | L | T | W | | L | | T |
|---|---|---|---|---|---|---|---|---|
| Bucknell | | – | | 9 | – | 0 | – | 0 |
| No. 6 Princeton | | – | | 9 | – | 0 | – | 0 |
| Susquehanna | | – | | 6 | – | 0 | – | 0 |
| Trenton State | | – | | 6 | – | 0 | – | 0 |
| Northeastern | | – | | 6 | – | 0 | – | 1 |
| No. 19 Holy Cross | | – | | 8 | – | 2 | – | 0 |
| Carnegie Tech | | – | | 6 | – | 2 | – | 0 |
| Hofstra | | – | | 6 | – | 2 | – | 1 |
| Cornell | | – | | 6 | – | 3 | – | 0 |
| No. 16 Boston University | | – | | 6 | – | 4 | – | 0 |
| Temple | | – | | 6 | – | 4 | – | 0 |
| Columbia | | – | | 5 | – | 3 | – | 0 |
| Villanova | | – | | 5 | – | 3 | – | 0 |
| Fordham | | – | | 5 | – | 4 | – | 0 |
| Franklin & Marshall | | – | | 5 | – | 4 | – | 0 |
| Penn | | – | | 5 | – | 4 | – | 0 |
| Penn State | | – | | 5 | – | 4 | – | 0 |
| Syracuse | | – | | 5 | – | 4 | – | 0 |
| Buffalo | | – | | 4 | – | 4 | – | 0 |
| Colgate | | – | | 4 | – | 5 | – | 0 |
| Dartmouth | | – | | 4 | – | 5 | – | 0 |
| Drexel | | – | | 3 | – | 4 | – | 0 |
| Harvard | | – | | 3 | – | 5 | – | 1 |
| Boston College | | – | | 3 | – | 6 | – | 0 |
| Yale | | – | | 2 | – | 5 | – | 2 |
| Pittsburgh | | – | | 3 | – | 7 | – | 0 |
| Geneva | | – | | 2 | – | 5 | – | 0 |
| Army | | – | | 2 | – | 7 | – | 0 |
| Brown | | – | | 2 | – | 7 | – | 0 |
| NYU | | – | | 1 | – | 7 | – | 0 |
| Tufts | | – | | 0 | – | 7 | – | 2 |
Rankings from AP Poll

The 1951 Susquehanna Crusaders football team was an American football team that represented Susquehanna University as an independent during the 1951 college football season. The Crusaders compiled a perfect 6–0 record and outscored opponents by a total of 185 to 91.

Amos Alonzo Stagg Jr. was Susquehanna's head coach for the 19th year. His father, Amos Alonzo Stagg, at age 89, had been coaching the team with his son since 1947. After the team completed its undefeated season, Stagg Sr. said: "I haven't had this feeling since 1943 when I was voted Coach of the Year. It's definitely the best team we've had in the five years I've been here."

Susquehanna's Jim Hazlett was selected as the first-team center on the 1951 Little All-America college football team. Hazlett declined opportunities to play for larger colleges in order to play under Stagg. Stagg Sr. praised Hazlett and said that "without Jim Hazlett, Susquehanna wouldn't have enjoyed the success it did this year." Hazlett later returned to Susquehanna as its head football coach from 1966 to 1977.

Hazlett and halfback Rich Young were both selected as first team players on the Associated Press' 1951 All-Pennsylvania football team. Young was a triple-threat player who was only five-feet six inches ND 160 pounds. He scored nine touchdowns and 10 passing touchdowns and also handled punting and kicking for the team.

The team played its home games at Selinsgrove, Pennsylvania.

== Schedule ==
| Date | Opponent | Site | Result | Attendance | Source |
|---|---|---|---|---|---|
| October 6 | Johns Hopkins | Selinsgrove, PA | W 47–32 | | |
| October 20 | Wagner^{†} | University Field; Selinsgrove, PA | W 37–20 | 2,200 | |
| October 27 | National Agricultural | Selinsgrove, PA | W 34–6 | | |
| November 3 | at Juniata | Huntingdon, PA | W 21–12 | 3,000 | |
| November 10 | at Haverford | Haverford, PA | W 27–7 | | |
| November 17 | at Ursinus | Collegeville, PA | W 19–14 | | |
^{†}Homecoming
