= 1951 Villanova Wildcats football team =

American college football season

1951 Villanova Wildcats football
- Conference: Independent
- Record: 5–3
- Head coach: Art Raimo (1st season)
- Captains: Domenic Liotta; Joseph Rilo
- Home stadium: Shibe Park

1951 Eastern college football independents records
| | Conf. | | | Overall |
| Team | W | L | T | W | | L | | T |
|---|---|---|---|---|---|---|---|---|
| Bucknell | | – | | 9 | – | 0 | – | 0 |
| No. 6 Princeton | | – | | 9 | – | 0 | – | 0 |
| Susquehanna | | – | | 6 | – | 0 | – | 0 |
| Trenton State | | – | | 6 | – | 0 | – | 0 |
| Northeastern | | – | | 6 | – | 0 | – | 1 |
| No. 19 Holy Cross | | – | | 8 | – | 2 | – | 0 |
| Carnegie Tech | | – | | 6 | – | 2 | – | 0 |
| Hofstra | | – | | 6 | – | 2 | – | 1 |
| Cornell | | – | | 6 | – | 3 | – | 0 |
| No. 16 Boston University | | – | | 6 | – | 4 | – | 0 |
| Temple | | – | | 6 | – | 4 | – | 0 |
| Columbia | | – | | 5 | – | 3 | – | 0 |
| Villanova | | – | | 5 | – | 3 | – | 0 |
| Fordham | | – | | 5 | – | 4 | – | 0 |
| Franklin & Marshall | | – | | 5 | – | 4 | – | 0 |
| Penn | | – | | 5 | – | 4 | – | 0 |
| Penn State | | – | | 5 | – | 4 | – | 0 |
| Syracuse | | – | | 5 | – | 4 | – | 0 |
| Buffalo | | – | | 4 | – | 4 | – | 0 |
| Colgate | | – | | 4 | – | 5 | – | 0 |
| Dartmouth | | – | | 4 | – | 5 | – | 0 |
| Drexel | | – | | 3 | – | 4 | – | 0 |
| Harvard | | – | | 3 | – | 5 | – | 1 |
| Boston College | | – | | 3 | – | 6 | – | 0 |
| Yale | | – | | 2 | – | 5 | – | 2 |
| Pittsburgh | | – | | 3 | – | 7 | – | 0 |
| Geneva | | – | | 2 | – | 5 | – | 0 |
| Army | | – | | 2 | – | 7 | – | 0 |
| Brown | | – | | 2 | – | 7 | – | 0 |
| NYU | | – | | 1 | – | 7 | – | 0 |
| Tufts | | – | | 0 | – | 7 | – | 2 |
Rankings from AP Poll

The 1951 Villanova Wildcats football team represented the Villanova University during the 1951 college football season. The head coach was Art Raimo, coaching his first season with the Wildcats. The team played their home games at Villanova Stadium in Villanova, Pennsylvania.

== Schedule ==
| Date | Opponent | Rank | Site | Result | Attendance | Source |
|---|---|---|---|---|---|---|
| September 29 | at Army | | Michie Stadium; West Point, NY | W 21–7 | | |
| October 6 | vs. Penn State | | Allentown High Stadium; Allentown, PA | W 20–14 | | |
| October 12 | at Alabama | | Denny Stadium; Tuscaloosa, AL | W 41–18 | 15,000 | |
| October 20 | at Kentucky | No. 12 | Stoll Field/McLean Stadium; Lexington, KY | L 13–35 | 35,000 | |
| October 27 | at Houston | | Rice Stadium; Houston, TX | W 33–27 | | |
| November 10 | Detroit | | Shibe Park; Philadelphia, PA | W 26–7 | 7,500 | |
| November 17 | at Boston College | | Braves Field; Boston MA | L 13–20 | 7,782 | |
| November 24 | at LSU | | State Fair Stadium; Shreveport, LA | L 7–45 | 13,000 | |
| December 1 | at Tulsa | | Tulsa, OK | Cancelled | | |
Rankings from AP Poll released prior to the game
