= 1951 Princeton Tigers football team =

American college football season

1951 Princeton Tigers football

Eastern champion
- Conference: Independent

Ranking
- Coaches: No. 6
- AP: No. 6
- Record: 9–0
- Head coach: Charlie Caldwell (7th season)
- Captain: David F. Hickok
- Home stadium: Palmer Stadium

1951 Eastern college football independents records
| | Conf. | | | Overall |
| Team | W | L | T | W | | L | | T |
|---|---|---|---|---|---|---|---|---|
| Bucknell | | – | | 9 | – | 0 | – | 0 |
| No. 6 Princeton | | – | | 9 | – | 0 | – | 0 |
| Susquehanna | | – | | 6 | – | 0 | – | 0 |
| Trenton State | | – | | 6 | – | 0 | – | 0 |
| Northeastern | | – | | 6 | – | 0 | – | 1 |
| No. 19 Holy Cross | | – | | 8 | – | 2 | – | 0 |
| Carnegie Tech | | – | | 6 | – | 2 | – | 0 |
| Hofstra | | – | | 6 | – | 2 | – | 1 |
| Cornell | | – | | 6 | – | 3 | – | 0 |
| No. 16 Boston University | | – | | 6 | – | 4 | – | 0 |
| Temple | | – | | 6 | – | 4 | – | 0 |
| Columbia | | – | | 5 | – | 3 | – | 0 |
| Villanova | | – | | 5 | – | 3 | – | 0 |
| Fordham | | – | | 5 | – | 4 | – | 0 |
| Franklin & Marshall | | – | | 5 | – | 4 | – | 0 |
| Penn | | – | | 5 | – | 4 | – | 0 |
| Penn State | | – | | 5 | – | 4 | – | 0 |
| Syracuse | | – | | 5 | – | 4 | – | 0 |
| Buffalo | | – | | 4 | – | 4 | – | 0 |
| Colgate | | – | | 4 | – | 5 | – | 0 |
| Dartmouth | | – | | 4 | – | 5 | – | 0 |
| Drexel | | – | | 3 | – | 4 | – | 0 |
| Harvard | | – | | 3 | – | 5 | – | 1 |
| Boston College | | – | | 3 | – | 6 | – | 0 |
| Yale | | – | | 2 | – | 5 | – | 2 |
| Pittsburgh | | – | | 3 | – | 7 | – | 0 |
| Geneva | | – | | 2 | – | 5 | – | 0 |
| Army | | – | | 2 | – | 7 | – | 0 |
| Brown | | – | | 2 | – | 7 | – | 0 |
| NYU | | – | | 1 | – | 7 | – | 0 |
| Tufts | | – | | 0 | – | 7 | – | 2 |
Rankings from AP Poll

The 1951 Princeton Tigers football team represented Princeton University in the 1951 college football season. Led by seventh-year head coach Charlie Caldwell, the team played its home games on campus at Palmer Stadium in Princeton, New Jersey. The independent Tigers won all nine games and were considered the best team in the East, winning the Lambert-Meadowlands Trophy, and finished sixth in both major polls.

Senior back Dick Kazmaier was a consensus All-American and won the Heisman Trophy by a wide margin; he was the nation's total offense leader and most accurate passer.

== Schedule ==
| Date | Opponent | Rank | Site | Result | Attendance | Source |
|---|---|---|---|---|---|---|
| September 29 | NYU | No. 18 | Palmer Stadium; Princeton, NJ | W 54–20 | 12,000 | |
| October 6 | at Navy | No. 14 | Thompson Stadium; Annapolis, MD | W 24–20 | 21,000 | |
| October 13 | at Penn | No. 13 | Franklin Field; Philadelphia, PA (rivalry) | W 13–7 | 60,000 | |
| October 20 | Lafayette | No. 9 | Palmer Stadium; Princeton, NJ | W 60–7 | 15,000 | |
| October 27 | No. 12 Cornell | No. 8 | Palmer Stadium; Princeton, NJ | W 53–15 | 49,000 | |
| November 3 | Brown | No. 6 | Palmer Stadium; Princeton, NJ | W 12–0 | 21,000 | |
| November 10 | at Harvard | No. 4 | Harvard Stadium; Boston, MA (rivalry) | W 54–13 | 22,000 | |
| November 17 | Yale | No. 6 | Palmer Stadium; Princeton, NJ (rivalry) | W 27–0 | 45,000 | |
| November 24 | Dartmouth | No. 5 | Palmer Stadium; Princeton, NJ | W 13–0 | 27,000 | |
Rankings from AP Poll released prior to the game

== Awards and honors ==
- Dick Kazmaier: Heisman Trophy, Maxwell Award, consensus All-American

== NFL draft ==
Two Tigers were selected in the 1952 NFL draft, held on January 17.

| Player | Position | Round | Overall | Franchise |
| Dick Pivirotto | Back | 15 | 174 | Pittsburgh Steelers |
| Dick Kazmaier | Back | 15 | 176 | Chicago Bears |
