= 1951 Holy Cross Crusaders football team =

American college football season

1951 Holy Cross Crusaders football
- Conference: Independent

Ranking
- Coaches: No. 17
- AP: No. 19
- Record: 8–2
- Head coach: Eddie Anderson (8th season)
- Home stadium: Fitton Field

1951 Eastern college football independents records
	Conf.			Overall
Team	W	L	T	W		L		T
Bucknell		–		9	–	0	–	0
No. 6 Princeton		–		9	–	0	–	0
Susquehanna		–		6	–	0	–	0
Trenton State		–		6	–	0	–	0
Northeastern		–		6	–	0	–	1
No. 19 Holy Cross		–		8	–	2	–	0
Carnegie Tech		–		6	–	2	–	0
Hofstra		–		6	–	2	–	1
Cornell		–		6	–	3	–	0
No. 16 Boston University		–		6	–	4	–	0
Temple		–		6	–	4	–	0
Columbia		–		5	–	3	–	0
Villanova		–		5	–	3	–	0
Fordham		–		5	–	4	–	0
Franklin & Marshall		–		5	–	4	–	0
Penn		–		5	–	4	–	0
Penn State		–		5	–	4	–	0
Syracuse		–		5	–	4	–	0
Buffalo		–		4	–	4	–	0
Colgate		–		4	–	5	–	0
Dartmouth		–		4	–	5	–	0
Drexel		–		3	–	4	–	0
Harvard		–		3	–	5	–	1
Boston College		–		3	–	6	–	0
Yale		–		2	–	5	–	2
Pittsburgh		–		3	–	7	–	0
Geneva		–		2	–	5	–	0
Army		–		2	–	7	–	0
Brown		–		2	–	7	–	0
NYU		–		1	–	7	–	0
Tufts		–		0	–	7	–	2
Rankings from AP Poll

The 1951 Holy Cross Crusaders football team was an American football team that represented the College of the Holy Cross as an independent during the 1951 college football season. In its eighth year under head coach Eddie Anderson, the team compiled an 8–2 record. The team was ranked at No. 21 in the 1951 Litkenhous Ratings.

The team played its home games at Fitton Field in Worcester, Massachusetts.

== Schedule ==
Date	Opponent	Site	Result	Attendance	Source
September 29	at Harvard	Harvard Stadium; Boston, MA	W 33–6	24,000	
October 6	Fordham	Fitton Field; Worcester, MA (rivalry)	W 54–20	23,000	
October 13	at Tulane	Tulane Stadium; New Orleans, LA	L 14–20	30,000	
October 20	NYU	Fitton Field; Worcester, MA	W 53–6	8,000	
October 27	at Brown	Brown Stadium; Providence, RI	W 41–6	10,000	
November 3	Colgate^{†}	Fitton Field; Worcester, MA	W 34–6	5,000	
November 10	Marquette	Fitton Field; Worcester, MA	W 39–13	18,000	
November 18	Quantico Marines	Fitton Field; Worcester, MA	W 39–14	18,000	
November 24	Temple	Fitton Field; Worcester, MA	W 41–7	7,500	
December 1	vs. Boston College	Braves Field; Boston, MA (rivalry)	L 14–19	40,000	
^{†}Homecoming
