= 1951 Columbia Lions football team =

American college football season

1951 Columbia Lions football
- Conference: Independent
- Record: 5–3
- Head coach: Lou Little (22nd season)
- Captain: Howard Hansen
- Home stadium: Baker Field

1951 Eastern college football independents records
	Conf.			Overall
Team	W	L	T	W		L		T
Bucknell		–		9	–	0	–	0
No. 6 Princeton		–		9	–	0	–	0
Susquehanna		–		6	–	0	–	0
Trenton State		–		6	–	0	–	0
Northeastern		–		6	–	0	–	1
No. 19 Holy Cross		–		8	–	2	–	0
Carnegie Tech		–		6	–	2	–	0
Hofstra		–		6	–	2	–	1
Cornell		–		6	–	3	–	0
No. 16 Boston University		–		6	–	4	–	0
Temple		–		6	–	4	–	0
Columbia		–		5	–	3	–	0
Villanova		–		5	–	3	–	0
Fordham		–		5	–	4	–	0
Franklin & Marshall		–		5	–	4	–	0
Penn		–		5	–	4	–	0
Penn State		–		5	–	4	–	0
Syracuse		–		5	–	4	–	0
Buffalo		–		4	–	4	–	0
Colgate		–		4	–	5	–	0
Dartmouth		–		4	–	5	–	0
Drexel		–		3	–	4	–	0
Harvard		–		3	–	5	–	1
Boston College		–		3	–	6	–	0
Yale		–		2	–	5	–	2
Pittsburgh		–		3	–	7	–	0
Geneva		–		2	–	5	–	0
Army		–		2	–	7	–	0
Brown		–		2	–	7	–	0
NYU		–		1	–	7	–	0
Tufts		–		0	–	7	–	2
Rankings from AP Poll

The 1951 Columbia Lions football team was an American football team that represented Columbia University as an independent during the 1951 college football season. In their 22nd season under head coach Lou Little, the Lions compiled a 5–3 record, and outscored their opponents 149 to 103. Howard Hansen was the team captain. The team was ranked at No. 59 in the 1951 Litkenhous Ratings.

Only eight games were played, rather than the usual nine, because two Columbia players were stricken with polio late in the preseason, prompting the team to pull out of its planned season opener at Princeton. When testing showed that no other team members were affected, the Lions went ahead with the remaining eight games of their schedule.

Columbia played its home games at Baker Field in Upper Manhattan, in New York City.

== Schedule ==
Date	Opponent	Site	Result	Attendance	Source
September 29	at Princeton	Palmer Stadium; Princeton, NJ	Canceled		
October 6	Harvard^{†}	Baker Field; New York, NY	W 35–0	15,000	
October 13	Yale	Baker Field; New York, NY	W 14–0	25,000	
October 20	at Penn	Franklin Field; Philadelphia, PA	L 13–28	40,000	
October 27	at Army	Michie Stadium; West Point, NY	L 9–14	20,349	
November 3	at Cornell	Schoellkopf Field; Ithaca, NY (rivalry)	W 21–20	21,000	
November 10	Dartmouth	Baker Field; New York, NY	W 21–6	20,000	
November 17	Navy	Baker Field; New York, NY	L 7–21	25,300	
November 24	Brown	Baker Field; New York, NY	W 29–14	10,000	
^{†}Homecoming
