= 1951 Dartmouth Indians football team =

American college football season

1951 Dartmouth Indians football
- Conference: Independent
- Record: 4–5
- Head coach: Tuss McLaughry (9th season)
- Captain: William Vesprini
- Home stadium: Memorial Field

1951 Eastern college football independents records
	Conf.			Overall
Team	W	L	T	W		L		T
Bucknell		–		9	–	0	–	0
No. 6 Princeton		–		9	–	0	–	0
Susquehanna		–		6	–	0	–	0
Trenton State		–		6	–	0	–	0
Northeastern		–		6	–	0	–	1
No. 19 Holy Cross		–		8	–	2	–	0
Carnegie Tech		–		6	–	2	–	0
Hofstra		–		6	–	2	–	1
Cornell		–		6	–	3	–	0
No. 16 Boston University		–		6	–	4	–	0
Temple		–		6	–	4	–	0
Columbia		–		5	–	3	–	0
Villanova		–		5	–	3	–	0
Fordham		–		5	–	4	–	0
Franklin & Marshall		–		5	–	4	–	0
Penn		–		5	–	4	–	0
Penn State		–		5	–	4	–	0
Syracuse		–		5	–	4	–	0
Buffalo		–		4	–	4	–	0
Colgate		–		4	–	5	–	0
Dartmouth		–		4	–	5	–	0
Drexel		–		3	–	4	–	0
Harvard		–		3	–	5	–	1
Boston College		–		3	–	6	–	0
Yale		–		2	–	5	–	2
Pittsburgh		–		3	–	7	–	0
Geneva		–		2	–	5	–	0
Army		–		2	–	7	–	0
Brown		–		2	–	7	–	0
NYU		–		1	–	7	–	0
Tufts		–		0	–	7	–	2
Rankings from AP Poll

The 1951 Dartmouth Indians football team was an American football team that represented Dartmouth College as an independent during the 1951 college football season. In their ninth season under head coach Tuss McLaughry, the Indians compiled a 4–5 record, and were outscored 152 to 121 by their opponents. William Vesprini was the team captain. The team was ranked at No. 79 in the 1951 Litkenhous Ratings.

Dartmouth played its home games at Memorial Field on the college campus in Hanover, New Hampshire.

== Schedule ==
Date	Opponent	Site	Result	Attendance	Source
September 29	Fordham	Memorial Field; Hanover, NH	L 6–14	11,000	
October 6	at Penn	Franklin Field; Philadelphia, PA	L 14–39	35,000	
October 13	at Army	Michie Stadium; West Point, NY	W 28–14	20,242	
October 20	Syracuse	Memorial Field; Hanover, NH	W 14–0	11,000	
October 27	at Harvard	Harvard Stadium; Boston, MA (rivalry)	W 26–20	20,000	
November 3	at Yale	Yale Bowl; New Haven, CT	W 14–10	20,000	
November 10	at Columbia	Baker Field; New York, NY	L 6–21	20,000	
November 17	Cornell	Memorial Field; Hanover, NH (rivalry)	L 13–21	14,000	
November 24	at No. 5 Princeton	Palmer Stadium; Princeton, NJ	L 0–13	27,000	
Rankings from AP Poll released prior to the game
