= 1951 NYU Violets football team =

American college football season

1951 NYU Violets football
- Conference: Independent
- Record: 1–7
- Head coach: Hugh Devore (2nd season)
- Home stadium: Triborough Stadium

1951 Eastern college football independents records
| | Conf. | | | Overall |
| Team | W | L | T | W | | L | | T |
|---|---|---|---|---|---|---|---|---|
| Bucknell | | – | | 9 | – | 0 | – | 0 |
| No. 6 Princeton | | – | | 9 | – | 0 | – | 0 |
| Susquehanna | | – | | 6 | – | 0 | – | 0 |
| Trenton State | | – | | 6 | – | 0 | – | 0 |
| Northeastern | | – | | 6 | – | 0 | – | 1 |
| No. 19 Holy Cross | | – | | 8 | – | 2 | – | 0 |
| Carnegie Tech | | – | | 6 | – | 2 | – | 0 |
| Hofstra | | – | | 6 | – | 2 | – | 1 |
| Cornell | | – | | 6 | – | 3 | – | 0 |
| No. 16 Boston University | | – | | 6 | – | 4 | – | 0 |
| Temple | | – | | 6 | – | 4 | – | 0 |
| Columbia | | – | | 5 | – | 3 | – | 0 |
| Villanova | | – | | 5 | – | 3 | – | 0 |
| Fordham | | – | | 5 | – | 4 | – | 0 |
| Franklin & Marshall | | – | | 5 | – | 4 | – | 0 |
| Penn | | – | | 5 | – | 4 | – | 0 |
| Penn State | | – | | 5 | – | 4 | – | 0 |
| Syracuse | | – | | 5 | – | 4 | – | 0 |
| Buffalo | | – | | 4 | – | 4 | – | 0 |
| Colgate | | – | | 4 | – | 5 | – | 0 |
| Dartmouth | | – | | 4 | – | 5 | – | 0 |
| Drexel | | – | | 3 | – | 4 | – | 0 |
| Harvard | | – | | 3 | – | 5 | – | 1 |
| Boston College | | – | | 3 | – | 6 | – | 0 |
| Yale | | – | | 2 | – | 5 | – | 2 |
| Pittsburgh | | – | | 3 | – | 7 | – | 0 |
| Geneva | | – | | 2 | – | 5 | – | 0 |
| Army | | – | | 2 | – | 7 | – | 0 |
| Brown | | – | | 2 | – | 7 | – | 0 |
| NYU | | – | | 1 | – | 7 | – | 0 |
| Tufts | | – | | 0 | – | 7 | – | 2 |
Rankings from AP Poll

The 1951 NYU Violets football team was an American football team that represented New York University as an independent during the 1951 college football season.

In their second season under head coach Hugh Devore, the Violets compiled a 1–7 record, and were outscored 329–79.

The team played two games at Triborough Stadium on Randalls Island in Manhattan. The rest of its schedule was on the road. NYU played no games at its on-campus home field, Ohio Field in University Heights, Bronx.

== Schedule ==
| Date | Opponent | Site | Result | Attendance | Source |
|---|---|---|---|---|---|
| September 29 | at No. 18 Princeton | Princeton Stadium; Princeton, NJ | L 20–54 | 12,000 | |
| October 5 | at Merchant Marine | Tomb Field; Kings Point, NY | W 21–13 | | |
| October 13 | Rutgers | Triborough Stadium; New York, NY | L 0–55 | 6,000 | |
| October 20 | at Holy Cross | Fitton Field; Worcester, MA | L 6–53 | 8,000 | |
| October 27 | at Lehigh | Taylor Stadium; Bethlehem, PA | L 20–27 | 6,000 | |
| November 3 | at Boston University | Fenway Park; Boston, MA | L 6–52 | 5,000 | |
| November 10 | at Temple | Temple Stadium; Philadelphia, PA | L 6–34 | 5,000 | |
| November 24 | vs. Fordham | Triborough Stadium; New York, NY | L 0–41 | 12,000 | |
Rankings from AP Poll released prior to the game
