= 1951 Yale Bulldogs football team =

American college football season

1951 Yale Bulldogs football
- Conference: Independent
- Record: 2–5–2
- Head coach: Herman Hickman (4th season)
- Captain: Robert Spears
- Home stadium: Yale Bowl

1951 Eastern college football independents records
	Conf.			Overall
Team	W	L	T	W		L		T
Bucknell		–		9	–	0	–	0
No. 6 Princeton		–		9	–	0	–	0
Susquehanna		–		6	–	0	–	0
Trenton State		–		6	–	0	–	0
Northeastern		–		6	–	0	–	1
No. 19 Holy Cross		–		8	–	2	–	0
Carnegie Tech		–		6	–	2	–	0
Hofstra		–		6	–	2	–	1
Cornell		–		6	–	3	–	0
No. 16 Boston University		–		6	–	4	–	0
Temple		–		6	–	4	–	0
Columbia		–		5	–	3	–	0
Villanova		–		5	–	3	–	0
Fordham		–		5	–	4	–	0
Franklin & Marshall		–		5	–	4	–	0
Penn		–		5	–	4	–	0
Penn State		–		5	–	4	–	0
Syracuse		–		5	–	4	–	0
Buffalo		–		4	–	4	–	0
Colgate		–		4	–	5	–	0
Dartmouth		–		4	–	5	–	0
Drexel		–		3	–	4	–	0
Harvard		–		3	–	5	–	1
Boston College		–		3	–	6	–	0
Yale		–		2	–	5	–	2
Pittsburgh		–		3	–	7	–	0
Geneva		–		2	–	5	–	0
Army		–		2	–	7	–	0
Brown		–		2	–	7	–	0
NYU		–		1	–	7	–	0
Tufts		–		0	–	7	–	2
Rankings from AP Poll

The 1951 Yale Bulldogs football team represented Yale University in the 1951 college football season. The Bulldogs were led by fourth-year head coach Herman Hickman, played their home games at the Yale Bowl and finished the season with a 2–5–2 record.

Yale was ranked at No. 95 in the 1951 Litkenhous Ratings.

== Schedule ==
Date	Opponent	Site	Result	Attendance	Source
September 22	Bates	Yale Bowl; New Haven, CT	W 48–0	18,000	
September 29	Navy	Yale Bowl; New Haven, CT	T 7–7	55,000	
October 6	Brown	Yale Bowl; New Haven, CT	L 13–14	35,000	
October 13	at Columbia	Baker Field; New York, NY	L 0–14	25,000	
October 20	No. 14 Cornell	Yale Bowl; New Haven, CT	L 0–27	30,000	
October 27	Colgate	Yale Bowl; New Haven, CT	W 27–7	20,000	
November 3	Dartmouth	Yale Bowl; New Haven, CT	L 10–14	20,000	
November 17	at No. 6 Princeton	Palmer Stadium; Princeton, NJ (rivalry)	L 0–27	45,000	
November 24	Harvard	Yale Bowl; New Haven, CT (The Game)	T 21–21	43,000	
Rankings from AP Poll released prior to the game

== NFL draft ==
The following Bulldog was selected in the National Football League draft following the season.

Round	Pick	Player	Position	NFL team
16	188	Bob Spears	B	Chicago Bears
