= 1951 Penn State Nittany Lions football team =

American college football season

1951 Penn State Nittany Lions football
- Conference: Independent
- Record: 5–4
- Head coach: Rip Engle (2nd season)
- Captains: Art Betts; Len Shephard
- Home stadium: New Beaver Field

1951 Eastern college football independents records
	Conf.			Overall
Team	W	L	T	W		L		T
Bucknell		–		9	–	0	–	0
No. 6 Princeton		–		9	–	0	–	0
Susquehanna		–		6	–	0	–	0
Trenton State		–		6	–	0	–	0
Northeastern		–		6	–	0	–	1
No. 19 Holy Cross		–		8	–	2	–	0
Carnegie Tech		–		6	–	2	–	0
Hofstra		–		6	–	2	–	1
Cornell		–		6	–	3	–	0
No. 16 Boston University		–		6	–	4	–	0
Temple		–		6	–	4	–	0
Columbia		–		5	–	3	–	0
Villanova		–		5	–	3	–	0
Fordham		–		5	–	4	–	0
Franklin & Marshall		–		5	–	4	–	0
Penn		–		5	–	4	–	0
Penn State		–		5	–	4	–	0
Syracuse		–		5	–	4	–	0
Buffalo		–		4	–	4	–	0
Colgate		–		4	–	5	–	0
Dartmouth		–		4	–	5	–	0
Drexel		–		3	–	4	–	0
Harvard		–		3	–	5	–	1
Boston College		–		3	–	6	–	0
Yale		–		2	–	5	–	2
Pittsburgh		–		3	–	7	–	0
Geneva		–		2	–	5	–	0
Army		–		2	–	7	–	0
Brown		–		2	–	7	–	0
NYU		–		1	–	7	–	0
Tufts		–		0	–	7	–	2
Rankings from AP Poll

The 1951 Penn State Nittany Lions football team represented the Pennsylvania State University as an independent during the 1951 college football season. The team was coached by Rip Engle and played its home games in New Beaver Field in State College, Pennsylvania. The team was ranked at No. 60 in the 1951 Litkenhous Ratings.

== Schedule ==
Date	Opponent	Site	Result	Attendance	Source
September 29	Boston University	New Beaver Field; State College, PA	W 40–34	15,536	
October 6	vs. Villanova	Allentown High Stadium; Allentown, PA	L 14–20		
October 13	at Nebraska	Memorial Stadium; Lincoln, NE	W 15–7	39,000	
October 20	No. 3 Michigan State^{†}	New Beaver Field; State College, PA (rivalry)	L 21–32	30,684	
October 27	West Virginia	New Beaver Field; State College, PA (rivalry)	W 13–7	16,200–17,206	
November 3	at Purdue	Ross–Ade Stadium; West Lafayette, IN	L 0–28	21,000	
November 10	Syracuse	New Beaver Field; State College, PA (rivalry)	W 32–13	16,612	
November 17	at Rutgers	Rutgers Stadium; Piscataway, NJ	W 13–7	15,000	
November 24	at Pittsburgh	Pitt Stadium; Pittsburgh, PA (rivalry)	L 7–13	20,145–22,771	
^{†}Homecoming; Rankings from AP Poll released prior to the game
