= 1951 Lafayette Leopards football team =

American college football season

1951 Lafayette Leopards football
- Conference: Middle Three Conference
- Record: 1–7 (0–2 Middle Three)
- Head coach: Clipper Smith (3rd season)
- Captains: Melvin Everingham; Gordon Patrizio
- Home stadium: Fisher Field

1951 Middle Three Conference football standings
	Conf.					Overall
Team	W		L		T	W		L		T
Lehigh $	2	–	0	–	0	7	–	2	–	0
Rutgers	1	–	1	–	0	4	–	4	–	0
Lafayette	0	–	2	–	0	1	–	7	–	0
$ – Conference champion

The 1951 Lafayette Leopards football team was an American football team that represented Lafayette College in the Middle Three Conference during the 1951 college football season. In its third and final season under head coach Clipper Smith, the team compiled a 1–7 record. Melvin Everingham and Gordon Patrizio were the team captains. The team played home games at Fisher Field in Easton, Pennsylvania.

== Schedule ==
Date	Opponent	Site	Result	Attendance	Source
September 22	Albright*	Fisher Field; Easton, PA	L 6–12	5,000	
September 29	Rutgers	Fisher Field; Easton, PA	L 12–47	6,000	
October 6	at Syracuse*	Archbold Stadium; Syracuse, NY	L 0–46	13,000	
October 13	Muhlenberg*	Fisher Field; Easton, PA	W 14–7	5,000	
October 20	at Princeton*	Palmer Stadium; Princeton, NJ	L 7–60	15,000	
October 27	Bucknell*	Fisher Field; Easton, PA	L 21–40	5,000	
November 10	Delaware*	Fisher Field; Easton, PA	L 7–25	6,000	
November 17	at Lehigh	Liberty High School Stadium; Bethlehem, PA (The Rivalry)	L 0–38	15,000	
*Non-conference game
