= 1951 Boston University Terriers football team =

American college football season

1951 Boston University Terriers football
- Conference: Independent

Ranking
- AP: No. 16
- Record: 6–4
- Head coach: Aldo Donelli (5th season)
- Home stadium: Fenway Park

1951 Eastern college football independents records
| | Conf. | | | Overall |
| Team | W | L | T | W | | L | | T |
|---|---|---|---|---|---|---|---|---|
| Bucknell | | – | | 9 | – | 0 | – | 0 |
| No. 6 Princeton | | – | | 9 | – | 0 | – | 0 |
| Susquehanna | | – | | 6 | – | 0 | – | 0 |
| Trenton State | | – | | 6 | – | 0 | – | 0 |
| Northeastern | | – | | 6 | – | 0 | – | 1 |
| No. 19 Holy Cross | | – | | 8 | – | 2 | – | 0 |
| Carnegie Tech | | – | | 6 | – | 2 | – | 0 |
| Hofstra | | – | | 6 | – | 2 | – | 1 |
| Cornell | | – | | 6 | – | 3 | – | 0 |
| No. 16 Boston University | | – | | 6 | – | 4 | – | 0 |
| Temple | | – | | 6 | – | 4 | – | 0 |
| Columbia | | – | | 5 | – | 3 | – | 0 |
| Villanova | | – | | 5 | – | 3 | – | 0 |
| Fordham | | – | | 5 | – | 4 | – | 0 |
| Franklin & Marshall | | – | | 5 | – | 4 | – | 0 |
| Penn | | – | | 5 | – | 4 | – | 0 |
| Penn State | | – | | 5 | – | 4 | – | 0 |
| Syracuse | | – | | 5 | – | 4 | – | 0 |
| Buffalo | | – | | 4 | – | 4 | – | 0 |
| Colgate | | – | | 4 | – | 5 | – | 0 |
| Dartmouth | | – | | 4 | – | 5 | – | 0 |
| Drexel | | – | | 3 | – | 4 | – | 0 |
| Harvard | | – | | 3 | – | 5 | – | 1 |
| Boston College | | – | | 3 | – | 6 | – | 0 |
| Yale | | – | | 2 | – | 5 | – | 2 |
| Pittsburgh | | – | | 3 | – | 7 | – | 0 |
| Geneva | | – | | 2 | – | 5 | – | 0 |
| Army | | – | | 2 | – | 7 | – | 0 |
| Brown | | – | | 2 | – | 7 | – | 0 |
| NYU | | – | | 1 | – | 7 | – | 0 |
| Tufts | | – | | 0 | – | 7 | – | 2 |
Rankings from AP Poll

The 1951 Boston University Terriers football team was an American football team that represented Boston University as an independent during the 1951 college football season. Led their fifth season under head coach Aldo Donelli, the Terriers compiled a 6–4 record and outscored opponents 299 to 157. The team played home games at Fenway Park in Boston.

Boston University was ranked No. 16 in the final AP poll and No. 54 in the final Litkenhous Ratings.

== Schedule ==
| Date | Time | Opponent | Site | Result | Attendance | Source |
|---|---|---|---|---|---|---|
| September 22 | | at William & Mary | Cary Field; Williamsburg, VA | L 25–34 | 10,000 | |
| September 29 | | at Penn State | New Beaver Field; State College, PA | L 34–40 | 15,536 | |
| October 6 | | at Louisville | duPont Manual Stadium; Louisville, KY | W 39–7 | 10,000 | |
| October 13 | 2:00 p.m. | Camp Lejeune | Fenway Park; Boston, MA | W 16–0 | 5,900 | |
| October 19 | | No. 16 Pacific (CA) | Fenway Park; Boston, MA | W 27–12 | | |
| October 27 | | at Temple | Temple Stadium; Philadelphia, PA | L 13–20 | 10,000 | |
| November 3 | | NYU | Fenway Park; Boston, MA | W 52–6 | 5,000 | |
| November 10 | | Oregon | Fenway Park; Boston, MA | W 32–6 | | |
| November 17 | | Wichita | Fenway Park; Boston, MA | W 39–6 | 8,442 | |
| November 24 | | Syracuse | Fenway Park; Boston, MA | L 19–26 | 10,148 | |
Rankings from AP Poll released prior to the game; All times are in Eastern time
