= 1951 Temple Owls football team =

American college football season

1951 Temple Owls football
- Conference: Independent
- Record: 6–4
- Head coach: Albert Kawal (3rd season)
- Home stadium: Temple Stadium

1951 Eastern college football independents records
	Conf.			Overall
Team	W	L	T	W		L		T
Bucknell		–		9	–	0	–	0
No. 6 Princeton		–		9	–	0	–	0
Susquehanna		–		6	–	0	–	0
Trenton State		–		6	–	0	–	0
Northeastern		–		6	–	0	–	1
No. 19 Holy Cross		–		8	–	2	–	0
Carnegie Tech		–		6	–	2	–	0
Hofstra		–		6	–	2	–	1
Cornell		–		6	–	3	–	0
No. 16 Boston University		–		6	–	4	–	0
Temple		–		6	–	4	–	0
Columbia		–		5	–	3	–	0
Villanova		–		5	–	3	–	0
Fordham		–		5	–	4	–	0
Franklin & Marshall		–		5	–	4	–	0
Penn		–		5	–	4	–	0
Penn State		–		5	–	4	–	0
Syracuse		–		5	–	4	–	0
Buffalo		–		4	–	4	–	0
Colgate		–		4	–	5	–	0
Dartmouth		–		4	–	5	–	0
Drexel		–		3	–	4	–	0
Harvard		–		3	–	5	–	1
Boston College		–		3	–	6	–	0
Yale		–		2	–	5	–	2
Pittsburgh		–		3	–	7	–	0
Geneva		–		2	–	5	–	0
Army		–		2	–	7	–	0
Brown		–		2	–	7	–	0
NYU		–		1	–	7	–	0
Tufts		–		0	–	7	–	2
Rankings from AP Poll

The 1951 Temple Owls football team was an American football team that represented Temple University as an independent during the 1951 college football season. In its third season under head coach Albert Kawal, the team compiled a 6–4 record and was outscored by a total of 176 to 168. The team played its home games at Temple Stadium in Philadelphia.

Temple was ranked at No. 98 in the 1951 Litkenhous Ratings.

== Schedule ==
Date	Opponent	Site	Result	Attendance	Source
September 21	at Syracuse	Archbold Stadium; Syracuse, NY	L 0–19	18,000	
September 29	at Brown	Brown Stadium; Providence, RI	W 20–14	8,500	
October 6	Rutgers	Temple Stadium; Philadelphia, PA	W 14–7	5,000	
October 13	Albright	Temple Stadium; Philadelphia, PA	W 47–6		
October 20	at Delaware	Wilmington Park; Wilmington, DE	W 13–7	8,300	
October 26	Boston University	Temple Stadium; Philadelphia, PA	W 20–13	10,000	
November 3	at Bucknell	Memorial Stadium; Lewisburg, PA	L 7–28	10,000	
November 10	NYU	Temple Stadium; Philadelphia, PA	W 34–6	5,000	
November 17	Fordham	Temple Stadium; Philadelphia, PA	L 6–35	7,500	
November 24	at No. 16 Holy Cross	Fitton Field; Worcester, MA	L 7–41	7,500	
Rankings from AP Poll released prior to the game
