= 1951 Lehigh Engineers football team =

American college football season

1951 Lehigh Engineers football

Middle Three champion
- Conference: Middle Three Conference
- Record: 7–2 (2–0 Middle Three)
- Head coach: Bill Leckonby (6th season)
- Captains: John Bergman; Richard Pradetto
- Home stadium: Taylor Stadium

1951 Middle Three Conference football standings
| | Conf. | | | | | Overall |
| Team | W | | L | | T | W | | L | | T |
|---|---|---|---|---|---|---|---|---|---|---|
| Lehigh $ | 2 | – | 0 | – | 0 | 7 | – | 2 | – | 0 |
| Rutgers | 1 | – | 1 | – | 0 | 4 | – | 4 | – | 0 |
| Lafayette | 0 | – | 2 | – | 0 | 1 | – | 7 | – | 0 |
$ – Conference champion

The 1951 Lehigh Engineers football team was an American football team that represented Lehigh University as an independent during the 1951 college football season. Lehigh won the Middle Three Conference championship for the second year in a row. In their sixth year under head coach Bill Leckonby, the Engineers compiled a 7–2 record, winning both games against their conference opponents. John Bergman and Richard Pradetto were the team captains. Lehigh played home games at Taylor Stadium on the university's main campus in Bethlehem, Pennsylvania.

== Schedule ==
| Date | Opponent | Site | Result | Attendance | Source |
|---|---|---|---|---|---|
| September 22 | at Delaware* | Wilmington Park; Wilmington, DE (rivalry) | L 0–7 | 8,500 | |
| September 29 | Williams* | Taylor Stadium; Bethlehem, PA | W 20–6 | 7,000 | |
| October 6 | Bucknell* | Taylor Stadium; Bethlehem, PA | L 7–47 | 8,000 | |
| October 13 | at Gettysburg* | Musselman Stadium; Gettysburg, PA | W 9–7 | 3,000 | |
| October 20 | at Rutgers | Rutgers Stadium; Piscataway, NJ | W 21–6 | 17,000 | |
| October 27 | NYU* | Taylor Stadium; Bethlehem, PA | W 25–20 | 6,000 | |
| November 3 | at Muhlenberg* | Allentown High School Stadium; Allentown, PA | W 3–2 | 3,500 | |
| November 10 | at Carnegie Tech* | Forbes Field; Pittsburgh, PA | W 34–7 | 3,000 | |
| November 17 | Lafayette | Liberty High School Stadium; Bethlehem, PA (The Rivalry) | W 32–0 | 15,000 | |
*Non-conference game
