= Bob Blaik =

American football player and coach

Biographical details
- Born: May 22, 1929; Dayton, Ohio
- Died: April 17, 2026 (aged 96); Scottsdale, Arizona
- Education: Colorado College

Playing career
- 1949–1950: Army
- Position: Quarterback

Coaching career (HC unless noted)
- 1951: Colorado College (backfield)
- 1956: Minnesota (backfield)
- 1957–1958: Miami (backfield)
- 1959–1960: Oklahoma (backfield)

Robert Blaik is an American former football player and coach. He was the son of United States Military Academy head football coach Earl Blaik and played for his father until he was dismissed from the team due to his involvement in a cheating scandal.

== Early life ==
Blaik played football, baseball, and ice hockey at Highland Falls High School in Highland Falls, New York. In 1947, he played quarterback at Phillips Exeter Academy.

== College ==
Blaik entered the United States Military Academy in 1948. He made the varsity football team in 1949 and spent the year as the backup behind Arnold Galiffa. He received some playing time late in certain victories. He threw a 36-yard touchdown pass to Frank Fischl in a 42–7 victory over Penn State and scored two touchdowns (one passing and one rushing) in a 63–6 victory over Columbia.

Galiffa graduated in 1950 and Blaik replaced him as starting quarterback. Army won its first eight games of the season to extend its unbeaten streak to 28 games. However, in the season-ending Army–Navy Game, the Cadets were upset by the Midshipmen 14–2. In that game, Blaik and Fischl completed 6 of 24 passes for 60 yards and threw 5 interceptions. Blaik also earned letters in baseball and ice hockey.

Prior to the start of the 1951 season, 90 cadets, including Blaik and 42 other members of the football team, were found to have cheated on exams. The students were required to withdraw from the academy or receive a general discharge. Blaik enrolled at Colorado College on September 11, 1951. However, he was ineligible to play football because the NCAA required a transferring player to sit out a year. He instead served an unofficial assistant to coach William C. Heiss. Blaik was chosen by former Army assistant Herman Hickman to be a member of the North team in that year's North–South Shrine Game. The South, led by Bill Wade won 35–7, with the North's only touchdown coming on a 42-yard pass from Blaik to Johnny Turco.

== Post-playing career ==
Blaik was selected 233rd overall by the Philadelphia Eagles in the 20th round of the 1952 NFL draft, but never played a game for the team. He assisted Heiss during the 1952 spring football practice. After receiving his bachelor of arts degree, he worked at the Stratford Army Engine Plant, where he was an expeditor in the purchasing department of the Bridgeport–Lycoming division of Avco.

In 1956, Blaik became an assistant coach under former Army assistant Murray Warmath at Minnesota. In 1957, he joined the coaching staff at Miami. Miami's head coach, Andy Gustafson, was an assistant to Earl Blaik at Dartmouth and Army and had known the younger Blaik since he was five years old. In 1959, Blaik became the backfield coach at Oklahoma. He resigned after the 1960 season to enter private business.

In 1961, Blaik joined his brother, Bill, in the oil business in Oklahoma. In 1973, he moved to Colorado Springs, Colorado, where he was a cattle rancher and broker. As of 2018, he resides in Scottsdale, Arizona.
