= 1951 Rutgers Queensmen football team =

American college football season

1951 Rutgers Queensmen football
- Conference: Middle Three Conference
- Record: 4–4 (1–1 Middle Three)
- Head coach: Harvey Harman (10th season)
- Captain: Jim Monahan
- Home stadium: Rutgers Stadium

1951 Middle Three Conference football standings
	Conf.					Overall
Team	W		L		T	W		L		T
Lehigh $	2	–	0	–	0	7	–	2	–	0
Rutgers	1	–	1	–	0	4	–	4	–	0
Lafayette	0	–	2	–	0	1	–	7	–	0
$ – Conference champion

The 1951 Rutgers Queensmen football team represented Rutgers University in the 1951 college football season. In their 10th season under head coach Harvey Harman, the Queensemen compiled a 4–4 record and outscored their opponents 184 to 114.

Rutgers was ranked at No. 90 in the 1951 Litkenhous Ratings.

== Schedule ==
Date	Opponent	Site	Result	Attendance	Source
September 29	at Lafayette	Fisher Field; Easton, PA	W 47–12	6,000	
October 6	at Temple*	Temple Stadium; Philadelphia, PA	L 7–14	5,000	
October 13	at NYU*	Triborough Stadium; New York, NY	W 55–0	6,000	
October 20	Lehigh	Rutgers Stadium; Piscataway, NJ	L 6–21	17,000	
November 3	Fordham*	Rutgers Stadium; Piscataway, NJ	W 13–7	5,000	
November 10	at Brown*	Brown Stadium; Providence, RI	W 28–21	5,000	
November 17	Penn State*	Rutgers Stadium; Piscataway, NJ	L 7–13	15,000	
November 24	Colgate*	Rutgers Stadium; Piscataway, NJ	L 21–26	8,000	
*Non-conference game
