= George Ackerman (American football) =

American football and baseball coach

Biographical details
- Born: 1905; Paterson, New Jersey, U.S.
- Died: August 9, 1971 (aged 65); Toms River, New Jersey, U.S.
- Education: Springfield (MA) (1930)

Coaching career (HC unless noted)

Football
- 1946–1956: Trenton State

George L. Ackerman (1905 – August 9, 1971) was an American football and baseball coach. He served as the head football coach at Trenton State College—now known as The College of New Jersey—from 1946 to 1956. He also served as TCNJ's head baseball coach.
