= Sol Blume =

Music festival in Sacramento, California

- Status: Active
- Genre: Music Festival (R&B, Soul, Hip-Hop)
- Frequency: Annually (Late Summer from 2025)
- Venue: Discovery Park
- Location: Sacramento, California
- Country: United States
- Years active: 2019–present
- Inaugurated: April 28, 2018
- Founder: Fornati Kumeh, Justin Nordan
- Most recent: August 2023
- Next event: August 15–17, 2025
- Attendance: 46,000 (2023)
- Sponsors: ENT Legends

Sol Blume is an annual music festival held in Sacramento, California, focusing on R&B, soul, and hip-hop genres. Founded in 2017 by Fornati Kumeh and Justin Nordan, the festival aims to provide a platform for young and upcoming artists from diverse backgrounds.

== History ==
Sol Blume Festival was established in 2018 to provide a platform for R&B, Soul, and Hip Hop music enthusiasts. The inaugural festival took place downtown in Sacramento at Cesar Chavez Plaza on April 28, 2018. Despite being a relatively small-scale event, it attracted 5,800 people. Sol Blume garnered attention for its focus on young and emerging artists, especially women and people of color.

=== 2019 ===
Following the success of its first edition, Sol Blume returned for its second year on Saturday, April 27, 2019. Held again in Downtown Sacramento, the festival expanded its lineup and attracted over 6,500 attendees. Headliners for the 2019 edition included Miguel, Jessie Reyez, Queen Naija, J.I.D, Masego, Tierra Whack, Summer Walker, Kiana Ledé, Snoh Aalegra, and Raveena.

=== 2020–2021 ===
Sol Blume took an hiatus from 2020 to 2021 due to the global lockdowns caused by the outbreak of the COVID-19 pandemic.

=== 2022 ===
After a two-year break, and the exit of Co-Founder Justin Nordan, Sol Blume was scheduled to return to Sacramento for a third year, taking place on Saturday, April 30, 2022, and Sunday, May 1, 2022. The festival changed its location to Discovery Park and expanded its duration to two days. The lineup for the 2022 edition of Sol Blume featured predominantly R&B and soul artists, with headliners such as Jorja Smith, PARTYNEXTDOOR, Alina Baraz, Majid Jordan, SiR, Lucky Daye, Kiana Ledé, dvsn, Fousheé, Jhené Aiko, Summer Walker, Thundercat, Syd, BLST, Smino, Tinashe, and Victoria Monet.

=== 2023 ===
Preparations for the fourth annual Sol Blume festival commenced in 2022 with the organizers announcing the return of the festival on January 17, 2023. However, in March 2023, California experienced the impact of two consecutive atmospheric rivers, resulting in heavy rainfall, snowfall, and powerful winds. The elevated water levels on the Sacramento River surpassed 32 feet, leading to water overflow at the Fremont Weir and into the Yolo Bypass. Due to severe flooding caused by multiple atmospheric rivers in Northern California, Discovery Park experienced significant damage, leading to the postponement of the festival originally scheduled for April 29th and 30th. The decision to reschedule the event to August 19 and 20 was made by City of Sacramento park officials to ensure safety and proper preparation. Despite the challenges posed by the sudden change in plans, the organizers, ENT Legends, adapted and moved the festival to a summer date. The majority of the initially announced lineup remained unchanged, with headliners Brent Faiyaz and Kehlani leading the way. The festival also featured performances by Ella Mai, Jessie Reyez, Isaiah Rashad, Chloe, Joey Bada$$, Pink Sweat$, Nao, Sabrina Claudio, Pink Pantheress, and other artists.

=== 2024–2025 ===
In 2024, Sol Blume marked its return for its fifth anniversary in February of 2024. For the first time, the festival was scheduled to span three days, slated to take place from May 3rd to May 5th, 2024. The 2024 lineup included artists such as SZA, PARTYNEXTDOOR, Snoh Aalegra, Omar Apollo, Pink Pantheress, Kaytranada, Masego, SiR, Wale, Kelela, Ari Lennox, and Doechii. On April 19, 2024, Sol Blume announced that due to ongoing site damage and safety concerns resulting from adverse weather conditions, the 2024 festival could not proceed as planned and was rescheduled to August 15–17, 2025. This adjustment also marks a permanent transition of Sol Blume to late summer, aimed at avoiding weather-related conflicts in the future.
