= Yolo Causeway =

Viaduct carrying Interstate 80 from Davis to West Sacramento

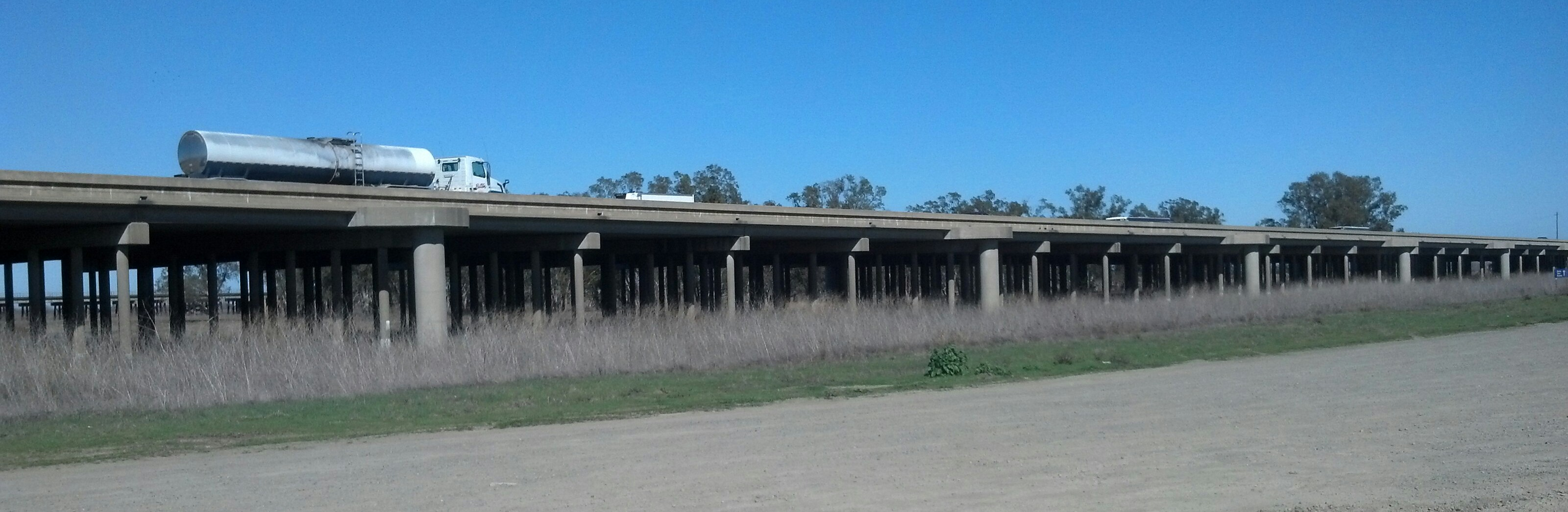
- Yolo Causeway from the Yolo Bypass Wildlife Area (2014)
- Coordinates: 38.563494°N 121.638392°W
- Carries: 6 lanes of I-80, pedestrians and bicycles
- Crosses: Yolo Bypass
- Locale: Yolo County, California
- Official name: Blecher-Freeman Memorial Causeway
- Maintained by: Caltrans
- NBI: 22 0044 & 22 0045

Characteristics
- Design: prestressed concrete tee beam
- Total length: 3.2 miles (5.1 km), divided into 877.8-metre (2,880 ft) western segment and 2,682.2-metre (8,800 ft) eastern segment
- Width: 35.7 metres (117 ft)
- No. of spans: 72 (western segment); 127 (eastern segment)

History
- Opened: 1916 (original), 1962 (current)

Statistics
- Daily traffic: 150,000 (2010)

Location
- Interactive map of Yolo Causeway

The Yolo Causeway is a 3.2-mile (5.1 km) long elevated highway viaduct on Interstate 80 that crosses the Yolo Bypass floodplain, connecting the cities of West Sacramento, California and Davis, California. It is officially named the Blecher-Freeman Memorial Causeway after two California Highway Patrol officers who were killed in the line of duty just east of the causeway.

== History ==
Ferry service was usually required to cross the Yolo Bypass basin during seasonal flooding; the first county seat of Yolo County was the town of Fremont, built near the ferry crossing near the confluence of the Sacramento and Feather Rivers. Fremont was wiped out during the floods of 1851. As an alternative, settlers established the Yolo Plankroad, which was a 4.5-mile-long (7.2 km) route that ended close to present-day Woodland, California.

Before a causeway was built, wheeled vehicles between Davis and Sacramento were forced to detour south through Tracy and Stockton during seasonal flooding. Once the ground was sufficiently dry to support vehicle traffic, the first vehicle to make it across the Yolo Bypass established the seasonal "Tule Jake" Road, which was typically passable only during the summer months.

=== 1916 causeway ===
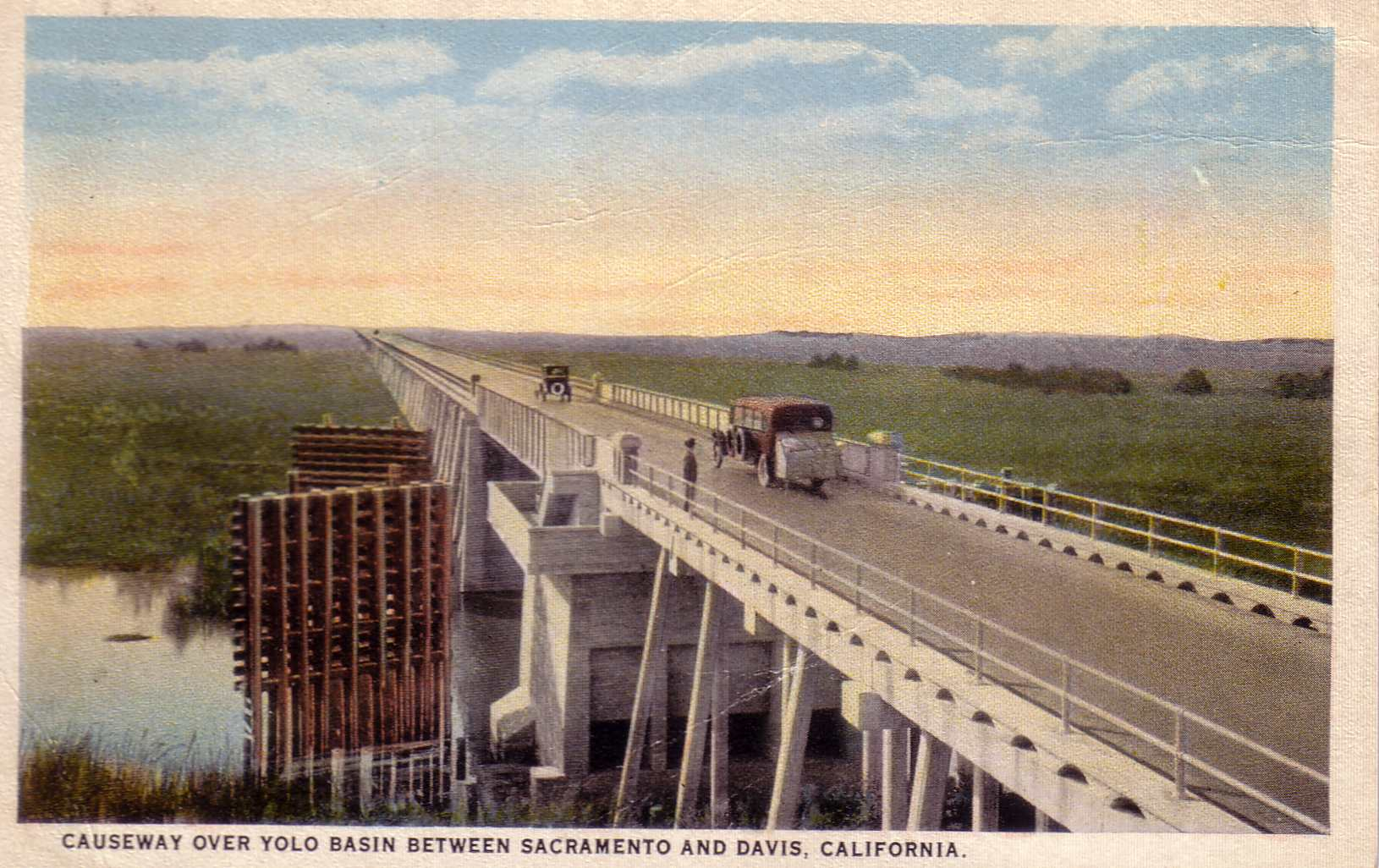
An artist's representation of the original Yolo Causeway, c. 1920

The original Yolo Causeway opened on March 18, 1916 as a two-lane structure 21 feet (6.4 m) wide and 16,538 feet (5,041 m; 3.1322 mi) long, connecting what is now the city of West Sacramento with Davis, California. Residents celebrated with the three day-long Causeway Celebration, held from May 11–14, 1916.

Initially, the causeway was composed of a timber trestle section (2,470 ft or 750 m long on the west) and a concrete trestle section (remaining length), with a 113-foot (34 m) plate girder bascule span, which was opened to permit passage of levee maintenance barges. The causeway width was doubled in 1933 when a new all-timber viaduct was added just south of the 1916 reinforced concrete structure; lights were added in 1950.

The Lincoln Highway association initially declined to shift its route to take advantage of the Yolo Causeway, but in 1928, following the completion of the Carquinez Bridge, it was made a part of the re-routed Lincoln Highway, the first road across America. Later, the causeway became a part of US Highways 40 and 99W.

=== 1962 causeway ===
The current causeway was built in 1962. From west to east, the causeway is composed of twinned 2,880-foot-long (880 m) concrete trestles, a 4,700-foot-long (1,400 m) earth fill segment, and twinned 8,800-foot-long (2,700 m) concrete trestles. The easternmost of the two bridges is the longer of the two and traffic reporters will sometimes refer to the two structures as the "long bridge" and the "short bridge". Each trestle carries a 46-foot-wide (14 m), three-lane roadway.

It was renamed the "Blecher-Freeman Memorial Causeway" in 1994, after two California Highway Patrol officers who were shot to death in 1978 after a highway stop near the causeway.

Vicinity of Yolo Causeway & Bypass
1 Fremont Weir Wildlife Area
2 Yolo Causeway (western segment/"short" bridge)
3 Yolo Causeway (earthen fill)
4 Yolo Causeway (eastern segment/"long" bridge)
5 Sacramento Bypass Wildlife Area
6 Yolo Bypass Wildlife Area

=== Proposed improvements ===
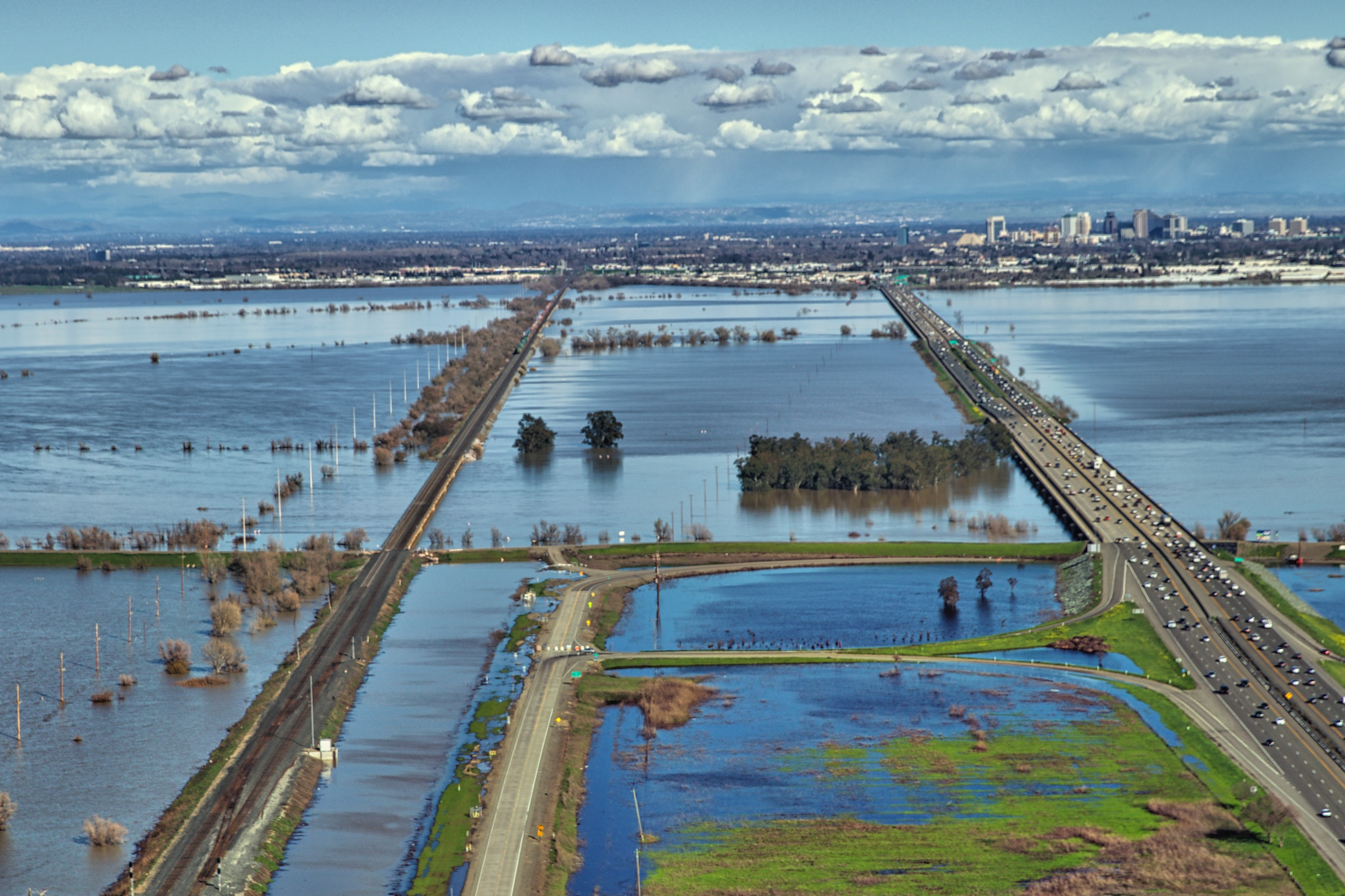
View east towards Sacramento during 2017 winter flooding; traffic on I-80 travels over the Yolo Causeway, on the right hand side of the photograph

In 2018, Caltrans announced plans to extend the carpool lane along I-80 from Solano County to Sacramento County, which includes plans to widen the causeway to four lanes in each direction. The proposed widening would not start until at least 2024, and the project is estimated to cost $800 million. One proposed alternative would use the extra lane as a toll lane.

Environmental groups such as the Natural Resources Defense Council and the Sierra Club are suing Caltrans citing a flawed environmental impact report that underestimates the impacts to traffic volumes, greenhouse gas emissions, and air quality. There are also concerns that the construction activities could impact the colony of Mexican free-tailed bats that live under the causeway, as well as the Swainson's hawks and Tricolored blackbirds that inhabit the area.

Under a 2013 amendment to the California Environmental Quality Act, Caltrans is required to mitigate environmental impact of additional traffic induced by any projects. However, the district director for Caltrans has stated that it is not feasible to fully mitigate the impacts of this project.

== Bypass ==
The 25,500-acre (10,300 ha) Yolo Bypass protects Sacramento and other California Central Valley communities from flooding. During wet seasons, it can be full of water. It contains the Vic Fazio Yolo Wildlife Area, the largest ecological restoration project west of the Everglades. Other nature preserves in it include the Fremont Weir Wildlife Area and Yolo Bypass Wildlife Area.

The Yolo Bypass begins at the Fremont Weir Wildlife Area, located approximately 15 miles (24 km) northwest of Sacramento and lying south of the Sacramento River, upstream from its confluence with the Feather River. When seasonal rains cause the river to rise, water is diverted via the concrete Fremont Weir into the Yolo Bypass floodplain. The Yolo Bypass can carry up to five times the capacity of the Sacramento River, preventing it from flooding Sacramento. The diverted water re-enters the Sacramento River delta near Rio Vista. A 2002 study showed that water begins to flow from the Sacramento into the Fremont Weir when the flow reaches approximately 2,000 cubic metres per second (4,200,000 cu ft/min); for comparison, the capacity of the Yolo Bypass is 14,000 to 15,000 cubic metres per second (30,000,000 to 32,000,000 cu ft/min).

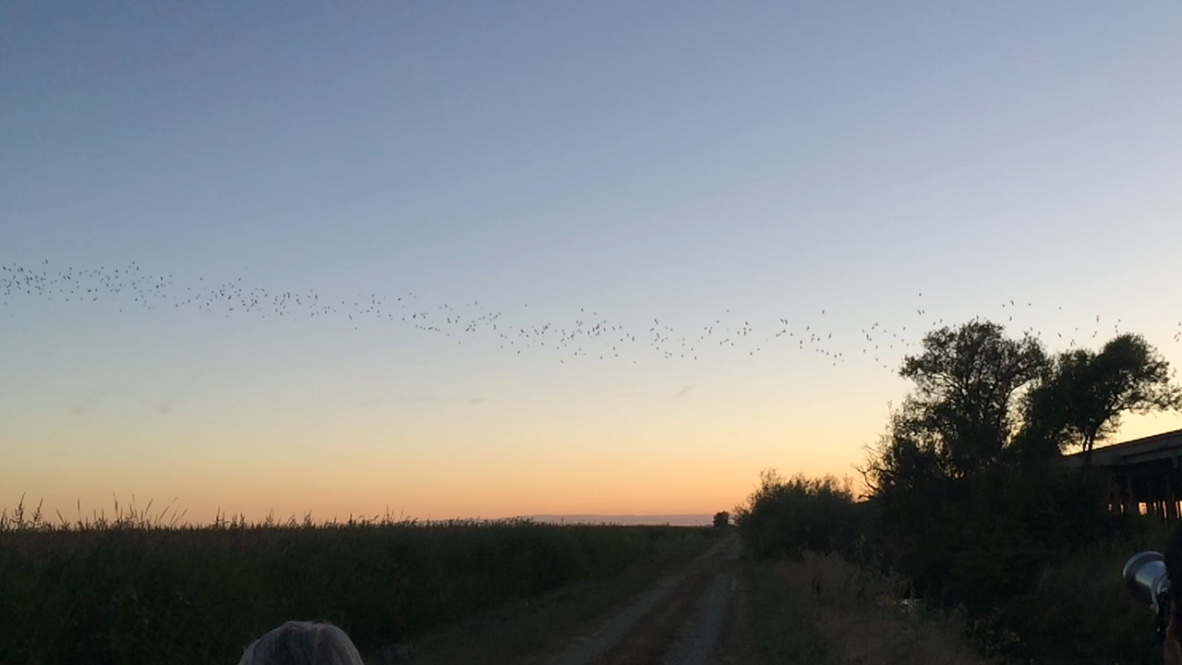
Bats fly out from under the Yolo Causeway (2018)

Approximately 250,000 Mexican free-tailed bats migrate to the Yolo Causeway every June. They roost in the expansion joints between the causeway segments, and feed on the insects that live in the wetlands formed by the Yolo Bypass.

== Causeway Classic ==
The Causeway Classic, an annual college football game between the Aggies of the University of California, Davis and the Hornets of California State University, Sacramento, is named after the causeway. A trophy made from a concrete core sample taken from the causeway is awarded to the winner.
