= 1954 Sacramento State Hornets football team =

American college football season

1954 Sacramento State Hornets football
- Conference: Far Western Conference
- Record: 0–7 (0–5 FWC)
- Head coach: Dave Strong (1st season)
- Home stadium: Charles C. Hughes Stadium

1954 Far Western Conference football standings
	Conf.					Overall
Team	W		L		T	W		L		T
San Francisco State $	5	–	0	–	0	8	–	2	–	0
Chico State	4	–	1	–	0	7	–	2	–	0
Humboldt State	3	–	2	–	0	5	–	5	–	0
Nevada	2	–	3	–	0	2	–	5	–	0
Cal Aggies	1	–	4	–	0	1	–	7	–	0
Sacramento State	0	–	5	–	0	0	–	7	–	0
$ – Conference champion; * – Second San Francisco State vs. Nevada game did not count in conference standings

The 1954 Sacramento State Hornets football team represented Sacramento State College—now known as California State University, Sacramento—as a member of the Far Western Conference (FWC) during the 1954 college football season. It was the program's inaugural season of intercollegiate play. Led by first-year head coach Dave Strong, Sacramento State compiled an overall record of 0–7 with a mark of 0–5 in conference play, placing last out of seven teams in the FWC. For the season the team was outscored by its opponents 217 to 40 and was held scoreless in four of the seven games. The Hornets played home games at Charles C. Hughes Stadium in Sacramento, California.

== Schedule ==
Date	Opponent	Site	Result	Attendance	Source
September 25	San Diego NTS (CA) (Note: Naval Training Center San Diego (Naval Training Station) was a U.S. Navy facility from 1923 to 1997.)*	Charles C. Hughes Stadium; Sacramento, CA	L 0–46		
October 2	Humboldt State	Hughes Stadium; Sacramento, CA	L 7–28	2,000	
October 9	Cal Aggies	Charles C. Hughes Stadium; Sacramento, CA (rivalry)	L 0–14		
October 23	Chico State	Charles C. Hughes Stadium; Sacramento, CA	L 0–40		
November 6	at Nevada	Mackay Stadium (Note: This stadium is the predecessor to the current Mackay Stadium, which was opened for the 1966 season.); Reno, NV	L 14–28		
November 12	at San Francisco State	Cox Stadium; San Francisco, CA	L 0–40		
November 20	at Alameda NAS (CA) (Note: Naval Air Station Alameda was a Naval Air Station from 1940 to 1997. For many years they fielded a team that played against colleges and other military teams.)	Alameda, CA	L 19–21		
*Non-conference game
