= 1954 Cal Aggies football team =

American college football season

1954 Cal Aggies football
- Conference: Far Western Conference
- Record: 1–7 (1–4 FWC)
- Head coach: Will Lotter (1st season)
- Captain: Duane Damron
- Home stadium: Aggie Field

1954 Far Western Conference football standings
	Conf.					Overall
Team	W		L		T	W		L		T
San Francisco State $	5	–	0	–	0	8	–	2	–	0
Chico State	4	–	1	–	0	7	–	2	–	0
Humboldt State	3	–	2	–	0	5	–	5	–	0
Nevada	2	–	3	–	0	2	–	5	–	0
Cal Aggies	1	–	4	–	0	1	–	7	–	0
Sacramento State	0	–	5	–	0	0	–	7	–	0
$ – Conference champion; * – Second San Francisco State vs. Nevada game did not count in conference standings

The 1954 Cal Aggies football team represented the College of Agriculture at Davis—now known as the University of California, Davis—as a member of the Far Western Conference (FWC) during the 1954 college football season. Led by first-year head coach Will Lotter, the Aggies compiled an overall record of 1–7 with a mark of 1–4 in conference play, placing fifth in the FWC. The team was outscored by its opponents 226 to 47 for the season. The Cal Aggies played home games at Aggie Field in Davis, California.

== Schedule ==
Date	Opponent	Site	Result	Source
September 24	California JV (Note: The University of California JV team was commonly known as the "Cal Ramblers".)*	Aggie Field; Davis, CA	L 6–35	
October 1	San Francisco State	Aggie Field; Davis, CA	L 7–41	
October 9	at Sacramento State	Charles C. Hughes Stadium; Sacramento, CA (rivalry)	W 14–0	
October 15	Humboldt State	Aggie Field; Davis, CA	L 0–21	
October 23	Nevada	Aggie Field; Davis, CA	L 0–13	
October 30	vs. Santa Barbara (Note: The game against Santa Barbara was part of an "All-UC Doubleheader" that was held annually from 1948 to 1963. The other game of the double-header was California vs. UCLA. The games were always held at the home stadium of either Cal or UCLA.)*	Los Angeles Memorial Coliseum; Los Angeles, CA	L 0–32	
November 6	at Occidental*	D.W. Patterson Field; Los Angeles, CA	L 13–44	
November 13	Chico State	Aggie Field; Davis, CA	L 7–40	
*Non-conference game
