= 1954 Humboldt State Lumberjacks football team =

American college football season

1954 Humboldt State Lumberjacks football
- Conference: Far Western Conference
- Record: 5–5 (3–2 FWC)
- Head coach: Phil Sarboe (4th season)
- Home stadium: Redwood Bowl

1954 Far Western Conference football standings
	Conf.					Overall
Team	W		L		T	W		L		T
San Francisco State $	5	–	0	–	0	8	–	2	–	0
Chico State	4	–	1	–	0	7	–	2	–	0
Humboldt State	3	–	2	–	0	5	–	5	–	0
Nevada	2	–	3	–	0	2	–	5	–	0
Cal Aggies	1	–	4	–	0	1	–	7	–	0
Sacramento State	0	–	5	–	0	0	–	7	–	0
$ – Conference champion; * – Second San Francisco State vs. Nevada game did not count in conference standings

The 1954 Humboldt State Lumberjacks football team represented Humboldt State College—now known as California State Polytechnic University, Humboldt—as a member of the Far Western Conference (FWC) during the 1954 college football season. Led by fourth-year head coach Phil Sarboe, the Lumberjacks compiled an overall record of 5–5 with a mark of 3–2 in conference play, placing third in the FWC, and outscored their opponents 174 to 116 for the season. The team played home games at the Redwood Bowl in Arcata, California.

== Schedule ==
Date	Opponent	Site	Result	Attendance	Source
September 18	Willamette*	Redwood Bowl; Arcata, CA	L 10–19	4,000	
September 25	Oakland Gaels*	Redwood Bowl; Arcata, CA	W 33–0		
October 2	at Sacramento State	Charles C. Hughes Stadium; Sacramento, CA	W 28–7	2,000	
October 9	Southern Oregon*	Redwood Bowl; Arcata, CA	W 34–0		
October 15	at Cal Aggies	Aggie Field; Davis, CA	W 21–0		
October 23	Stanford JV*	Redwood Bowl; Arcata, CA	L 13–31		
October 30	Chico State	Redwood Bowl; Arcata, CA	L 7–18		
November 6	San Francisco State	Redwood Bowl; Arcata, CA	L 7–14	2,500	
November 13	at Nevada	Mackay Stadium (Note: This stadium is the predecessor to the current Mackay Stadium, which was opened for the 1966 season.); Reno, NV	W 21–14		
November 19	at Cal Poly*	Mustang Stadium; San Luis Obispo, CA	L 0–13		
*Non-conference game
