= 1954 Chico State Wildcats football team =

American college football season

1954 Chico State Wildcats football
- Conference: Far Western Conference
- Record: 7–2 (4–1 FWC)
- Head coach: Gus Manolis (1st season)
- Offensive scheme: T formation
- Home stadium: Chico High School Stadium

1954 Far Western Conference football standings
	Conf.					Overall
Team	W		L		T	W		L		T
San Francisco State $	5	–	0	–	0	8	–	2	–	0
Chico State	4	–	1	–	0	7	–	2	–	0
Humboldt State	3	–	2	–	0	5	–	5	–	0
Nevada	2	–	3	–	0	2	–	5	–	0
Cal Aggies	1	–	4	–	0	1	–	7	–	0
Sacramento State	0	–	5	–	0	0	–	7	–	0
$ – Conference champion; * – Second San Francisco State vs. Nevada game did not count in conference standings

The 1954 Chico State Wildcats football team represented Chico State College—now known as California State University, Chico—as a member of the Far Western Conference (FWC) during the 1954 college football season. Led by first-year head coach Gus Manolis, Chico State compiled an overall record of 7–2 with a mark of 4–1 in conference play, placing second in the FWC. The team outscored its opponents 241 to 73 for the season. The Wildcats played home games at Chico High School Stadium in Chico, California.

Manolis had previously spent four years as the head football coach at Yuba Junior College. The team operated from a "California T" formation and had between 18 and 20 returning lettermen, including end George Maderos and halfback Frank Ferraiuolo.

== Schedule ==
Date	Opponent	Site	Result	Source
September 25	Naval Air Station Alameda (Note: Naval Air Station Alameda was a Naval Air Station from 1940 to 1997. For many years they fielded a team that played against colleges and other military teams.)*	Chico High School Stadium; Chico, CA	W 19–12	
October 2	Nevada	Chico High School Stadium; Chico, CA	W 32–0	
October 9	Pepperdine*	Chico High School Stadium; Chico, CA	L 13–14	
October 16	at Whittier*	Hadley Field; Whittier, CA	W 34–14	
October 23	at Sacramento State	Charles C. Hughes Stadium; Sacramento, CA	W 40–0	
October 30	at Humboldt State	Redwood Bowl; Arcata, CA	W 18–7	
November 6	Southern Oregon*	Chico High School Stadium; Chico, CA	W 39–12	
November 13	Cal Aggies	Chico High School Stadium; Chico, CA	W 40–7	
November 19	at San Francisco State	Cox Stadium; San Francisco, CA	L 6–7	
*Non-conference game

== 1955 NFL draft ==
The following Chico State players were selected in the 1955 NFL draft.

Player	Position	Round	Overall	NFL team
George Maderos	Defensive back	21	250	San Francisco 49ers
