= 1954 San Francisco State Gators football team =

American college football season

1954 San Francisco State Gators football

FWC champion
- Conference: Far Western Conference
- Record: 8–2 (5–0 FWC)
- Head coach: Joe Verducci (5th season)
- Home stadium: Cox Stadium

1954 Far Western Conference football standings
	Conf.					Overall
Team	W		L		T	W		L		T
San Francisco State $	5	–	0	–	0	8	–	2	–	0
Chico State	4	–	1	–	0	7	–	2	–	0
Humboldt State	3	–	2	–	0	5	–	5	–	0
Nevada	2	–	3	–	0	2	–	5	–	0
Cal Aggies	1	–	4	–	0	1	–	7	–	0
Sacramento State	0	–	5	–	0	0	–	7	–	0
$ – Conference champion; * – Second San Francisco State vs. Nevada game did not count in conference standings

The 1954 San Francisco State Gators football team represented San Francisco State College—now known as San Francisco State University—as a member of the Far Western Conference (FWC) during the 1954 college football season. Led by fifth-year head coach Joe Verducci, San Francisco State compiled an overall record of 8–2 with a mark of 5–0 in conference play, winning the FWC title. For the season the team outscored its opponents 253 to 120. The Gators played home games at Cox Stadium in San Francisco.

== Schedule ==
Date	Opponent	Site	Result	Attendance	Source
September 18	at San Quentin State Prison*	San Quentin Prison (Note: This was the first of six annual games against San Quentin Prison. All of the games were held within the walls of the prison itself.); San Quentin, CA	W 26–13		
September 25	at Nevada	Mackay Stadium (Note: This stadium is the predecessor to the current Mackay Stadium, which was opened for the 1966 season.); Reno, NV	W 39–19		
October 1	at Cal Aggies	Aggie Field; Davis, CA	W 41–7		
October 8	San Diego State*	Cox Stadium; San Francisco, CA	W 12–10	5,500	
October 16	at Cal Poly*	Mustang Stadium; San Luis Obispo, CA	L 0–19		
October 29	Nevada (Note: The second San Francisco State vs. Nevada game did not count as a conference game.)*	Cox Stadium; San Francisco, CA	W 54–0		
November 6	at Humboldt State	Redwood Bowl; Arcata, CA	W 14–7	2,500	
November 12	Sacramento State	Cox Stadium; San Francisco, CA	W 40–0		
November 19	Chico State	Cox Stadium; San Francisco, CA	W 7–6		
November 26	at Fresno State*	Ratcliffe Stadium; Fresno, CA	L 20–39	4,085	
*Non-conference game
