= Vic Fazio Yolo Wildlife Area =

Coordinates: 38.5614°N 121.6290°W

The Vic Fazio Yolo Wildlife Area is a 3,700 acres (15 km^{2}) wetland restoration project conducted by the United States Army Corps of Engineers and Ducks Unlimited within the Yolo Bypass Wildlife Area located in the Yolo Bypass in Yolo County, California, between the cities of Sacramento and Davis. The Yolo Causeway, part of Interstate 80, runs through it. The restoration was named for Congressman Vic Fazio, who lobbied for the project and was instrumental in appropriating funds for the initial construction. The Yolo Bypass Wildlife Area was dedicated in 1997 by President Bill Clinton. The facility is managed by the California Department of Fish and Wildlife while the educational programs and public tours are administered by the Yolo Basin Foundation, which works to educate and inform the public.

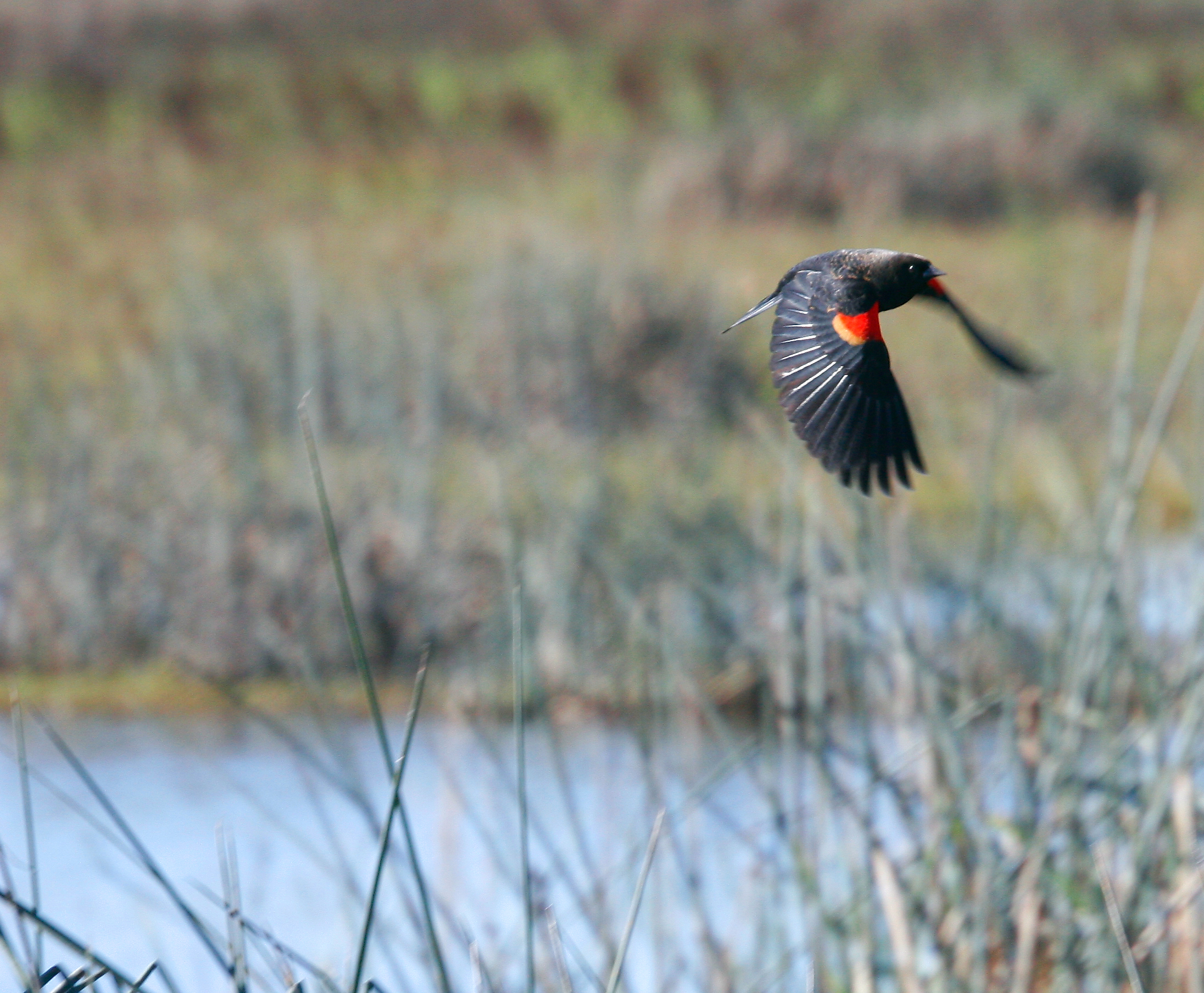
A Red-Winged Blackbird in flight at the Vic Fazio Wildlife Area.

In 2001, the Wildlife Area expanded to over 16,000 acres (65 km^{2}) through the acquisition of the Glide and Los Rios properties. Since this time, extensive wetland enhancement and restoration projects have proceeded rapidly. The Department of Fish and Wildlife has incorporated agriculture into the management of the property to generate operating income and to provide wildlife habitat.

The floodplain that makes up the Yolo Bypass receives water from the Sacramento River and provides an Important Bird Area of the Pacific Flyway for an impressive variety of waterfowl. Unless the area is impassable due to normal seasonal flooding, a dirt and gravel road is open to the public for driving and walking tours, and a docent-led tour is given once per month from October through June. The Wildlife Area is also home to the largest urban colony of Mexican free-tailed bats in California, and the Yolo Basin Foundation runs bat tours during the summer months.

It is one of the sites recommended by California's Department of Fish and Wildlife for wildlife viewing.
