= Will Lotter =

American athletics coach (1925–2019)

Biographical details
- Born: December 28, 1924; Alameda, California, U.S.
- Died: May 20, 2019 (aged 94); Davis, California, U.S.

Playing career

Football
- 1948: California

Coaching career (HC unless noted)

Football
- 1949–1951: San Ramon Valley HS (CA)
- 1952–1953: Cal Aggies (assistant)
- 1954: Cal Aggies
- 1956–1957: Cal Aggies
- 1959–1963: UC Davis

Baseball
- 1950–1952: San Ramon Valley HS (CA)
- 1953–1958: Cal Aggies

Men's soccer
- 1972–1987: UC Davis

Head coaching record
- Overall: 26–42–3 (college football); 45–98 (college baseball)

Accomplishments and honors

Championships
- Football; 2 Far Western (1956, 1963)

Williard Stanley Lotter (December 28, 1925 – May 20, 2019) was an American football, baseball, and soccer coach, and a university faculty member and administrator. He served as the head football coach for three stints at University of California, Davis (UC Davis)—known as the Northern Branch of the College of Agriculture before 1959—in 1954, from 1956 to 1957, and from 1959 to 1963, compiling a record of 26–42–3. Lotter was the head baseball coach at the school, serving from 1953 to 1958 and tallying a mark of 45–98. He also head coach of the men's soccer team as UC Davis from 1972 to 1987. Lotter played college football at the University of California, Berkeley. He graduated from Berkeley with a bachelor's degree in physical education in 1949, earned a Master of Education from California State University, Sacramento in 1955, and received a Doctor of Education from Berkeley in 1960. Lotter served as a faculty member of the Physical Education Department at UC Davis from 1952 to 1993. He was also the acting dean of students at UC Davis from 1969 to 1970.

Lotter grew up in Alameda, California. He died on May 20, 2019, at the age of 94, at his home in Davis, California.

== Head coaching record ==
=== College football ===
| Year | Team | Overall | Conference | Standing | Bowl/playoffs |
|---|---|---|---|---|---|
Cal Aggies (Far Western Conference) (1954)
| 1954 | Cal Aggies | 1–7 | 1–4 | 5th | |
Cal Aggies (Far Western Conference) (1956–1957)
| 1956 | Cal Aggies | 7–2 | 4–1 | T–1st | |
| 1957 | Cal Aggies | 0–7–1 | 0–5 | 6th | |
UC Davis Aggies (Far Western Conference) (1959–1963)
| 1959 | UC Davis | 1–8 | 0–5 | 6th | |
| 1960 | UC Davis | 0–8–1 | 0–5 | 6th | |
| 1961 | UC Davis | 5–4 | 3–2 | 3rd | |
| 1962 | UC Davis | 5–4 | 2–3 | T–4th | |
| 1963 | UC Davis | 6–2–1 | 3–1–1 | T–1st | |
| Cal Aggies / UC Davis: | | 26–42–3 | 10–16–2 | | |
| Total: | | 26–42–3 | | | |
National championship Conference title Conference division title or championship game berth
