= Walt E. Ambord =

American football player and coach (1930–2016)

Biographical details
- Born: September 25, 1930; Dorris, California, U.S.
- Died: February 19, 2016 (aged 85); San Clemente, California, U.S.

Playing career

Football
- 1951–1954: Los Angeles State
- Position: Halfback

Coaching career (HC unless noted)

Football
- 1955–1956: Mount Carmel HS (CA) (assistant)
- 1957–1959: Mount Carmel HS (CA)
- 1960–1961: Pomona (assistant)
- 1962–1977: Pomona/Pomona-Pitzer

Head coaching record
- Overall: 50–91–4 (college football)

Walter E. Ambord (September 25, 1930 – February 19, 2016) was an American football player and coach. He served as the head football coach at Pomona College in Claremont, California from 1962 to 1977, compiling a record of 50–91–4. Ambord also coached baseball, wrestling, and golf at Pomona and was an associate professor of physical education at the school from 1960 to 1986.

Ambord was born in Dorris, California and moved as a child with his family to San Fernando, California. He attended North Hollywood High School, lettering in football, baseball, and track before graduating in 1948. He spent two years at Valley Junior College in Van Nuys, co-captaining the football team as a sophomore and also participating in basketball, and baseball, and track. Ambord then moved on to Los Angeles State College—now known as California State University, Los Angeles. He played football for the Los Angeles Diablos, serving as team captain of the 1954 team and earning all-California Collegiate Athletic Association as a senior. In 1955, Ambord had a brief stint with the Washington Redskins of the National Football League (NFL).

Ambord began his coaching career in 1955 as an assistant varsity football coach at Mount Carmel High School in Los Angeles. During two years as an assistant coach, Mount Carmel won consecutive league titles. In 1957, Ambord was promoted to head coach at Mount Carmel and led the team for three seasons. He joined the coaching staff at Pomona in 1960 and was an assistant football coach for two seasons before succeeding Chuck Mills as head football coach in 1962.

== Head coaching record ==
=== College football ===
Year	Team	Overall	Conference	Standing	Bowl/playoffs	Coaches^{#}
Pomona / Pomona-Pitzer Sagehens (Southern California Intercollegiate Athletic Conference) (1962–1977)
1962	Pomona	4–5	2–3	T–4th		
1963	Pomona	5–3–1	1–2	T–3rd		
1964	Pomona	4–5	1–4	5th		
1965	Pomona	5–5	3–2	2nd		
1966	Pomona	6–2–1	3–1–1	T–2nd		
1967	Pomona	3–6	3–2	T–2nd		
1968	Pomona	4–5–1	2–3	5th		
1969	Pomona	3–6	2–3	4th		
1970	Pomona	6–3	2–2	T–3rd		
1971	Pomona	4–5	3–2	T–2nd		
1972	Pomona-Pitzer	2–7	1–4	T–4th		
1973	Pomona-Pitzer	1–7–1	0–5	6th		
1974	Pomona-Pitzer	1–8	1–4	T–4th		
1975	Pomona-Pitzer	0–9	0–5	6th		
1976	Pomona-Pitzer	2–7	0–5	6th		
1977	Pomona-Pitzer	0–8	0–5	6th		
Pomona / Pomona-Pitzer:		50–91–4	24–53–1			
Total:		50–91–4				
