= 1954 Pepperdine Waves football team =

American college football season

1954 Pepperdine Waves football
- Conference: California Collegiate Athletic Association
- Record: 6–2 (0–0 CCAA)
- Head coach: Gordon McEachron (2nd season)
- Home stadium: El Camino Stadium

1954 California Collegiate Athletic Association football standings
	Conf.					Overall
Team	W		L		T	W		L		T
Fresno State $	4	–	0	–	0	7	–	3	–	0
Cal Poly	3	–	1	–	0	6	–	4	–	0
San Diego State	2	–	2	–	0	5	–	4	–	0
Santa Barbara	1	–	3	–	0	4	–	5	–	0
Los Angeles State	0	–	4	–	0	2	–	6	–	1
Pepperdine *	0	–	0	–	0	6	–	2	–	0
$ – Conference champion; Pepperdine had a record of 1–2 against conference opponents, but those games did not count in the CCAA standings.

The 1954 Pepperdine Waves football team represented George Pepperdine College—now known as Pepperdine University as member of the California Collegiate Athletic Association (CCAA) during the 1954 college football season. Led by second-year head coach Gordon McEachron, the Waves compiled an overall record of 6–2. Pepperdine went 1–2 against conference opponents, but did not play a full conference schedule, and thus those games did not count in the CCAA standings. The team played home games at El Camino Stadium on the campus of El Camino College in Torrance, California.

== Schedule ==
Date	Opponent	Site	Result	Attendance	Source
September 25	at La Verne*	La Verne, CA	W 42–7		
October 2	Redlands*	El Camino Stadium; Torrance, CA	W 13–0		
October 9	at Chico State*	University Stadium; Chico, CA	W 14–13		
October 16	Occidental*	El Camino Stadium; Torrance, CA (Black and Blue Game)	W 14–0		
October 30	Whittier*	El Camino Stadium; Torrance, CA	W 22–6		
November 6	Santa Barbara*	El Camino Stadium; Torrance, CA	L 12–13		
November 13	at San Diego State*	Aztec Bowl; San Diego, CA	L 13–20	5,000	
November 19	Los Angeles State*	El Camino Stadium; Torrance, CA ("Old Shoe" rivalry)	W 6–0		
*Non-conference game

== Team players in the NFL ==
No Pepperdine players were selected in the 1955 NFL draft. The following finished their Pepperdine career in 1954, were not drafted, but played in the NFL.

Player	Position	First NFL team
Frank Williams	Fullback	1961 Los Angeles Rams
