= 1954 Santa Barbara Gauchos football team =

American college football season

1954 Santa Barbara Gauchos football
- Conference: California Collegiate Athletic Association
- Record: 4–5 (1–3 CCAA)
- Head coach: Stan Williamson (7th season)
- Home stadium: La Playa Stadium

1954 California Collegiate Athletic Association football standings
	Conf.					Overall
Team	W		L		T	W		L		T
Fresno State $	4	–	0	–	0	7	–	3	–	0
Cal Poly	3	–	1	–	0	6	–	4	–	0
San Diego State	2	–	2	–	0	5	–	4	–	0
Santa Barbara	1	–	3	–	0	4	–	5	–	0
Los Angeles State	0	–	4	–	0	2	–	6	–	1
Pepperdine *	0	–	0	–	0	6	–	2	–	0
$ – Conference champion; Pepperdine had a record of 1–2 against conference opponents, but those games did not count in the CCAA standings.

The 1954 UC Santa Barbara Gauchos football team represented Santa Barbara College (Note: University of California, Santa Barbara was known as Santa Barbara College of the University of California from 1944 to 1957.) during the 1954 college football season.

Santa Barbara competed in the California Collegiate Athletic Association (CCAA). The team was led by seventh-year head coach Stan Williamson, and played home games at La Playa Stadium in Santa Barbara, California. They finished the season with a record of four wins and five losses (4–5, 1–3 CCAA).

== Schedule ==
Date	Opponent	Site	Result	Attendance	Source
September 24	at Whittier*	Hadley Field; Whittier, CA	W 27–18		
October 1	at Occidental*	D.W. Patterson Field; Los Angeles, CA	L 0–2		
October 8	Cal Poly	La Playa Stadium; Santa Barbara, CA	L 6–47		
October 15	at Los Angeles State	Snyder Field; Los Angeles, CA	W 9–6		
October 23	Fresno State	La Playa Stadium; Santa Barbara, CA	L 20–26	5,000	
October 30	vs. Cal Aggies (Note: The game against the Cal Aggies was part of an "All-UC Doubleheader" that was held annually from 1948 to 1963. The other game of the double-header was California vs. UCLA. The games were always held at the home stadium of either Cal or UCLA.)*	Los Angeles Memorial Coliseum; Los Angeles, CA	W 32–0		
November 6	at Pepperdine*	El Camino Stadium; Torrance, CA	W 13–12		
November 12	Redlands*	La Playa Stadium; Santa Barbara, CA	L 0–20		
November 20	San Diego State	La Playa Stadium; Santa Barbara, CA	L 14–33	5,000	
*Non-conference game
