= 1954 Nevada Wolf Pack football team =

American college football season

1954 Nevada Wolf Pack football
- Conference: Far Western Conference
- Record: 2–5 (2–3 FWC)
- Head coach: Jake Lawlor (3rd season)
- Home stadium: Mackay Stadium

1954 Far Western Conference football standings
	Conf.					Overall
Team	W		L		T	W		L		T
San Francisco State $	5	–	0	–	0	8	–	2	–	0
Chico State	4	–	1	–	0	7	–	2	–	0
Humboldt State	3	–	2	–	0	5	–	5	–	0
Nevada	2	–	3	–	0	2	–	5	–	0
Cal Aggies	1	–	4	–	0	1	–	7	–	0
Sacramento State	0	–	5	–	0	0	–	7	–	0
$ – Conference champion; * – Second San Francisco State vs. Nevada game did not count in conference standings

The 1954 Nevada Wolf Pack football team represented the University of Nevada during the 1954 college football season. Nevada competed and returned as a sixteenth–year member of the Far Western Conference (FWC). The Wolf Pack were led by third-year head coach Jake Lawlor, who resigned after the end of the season. They played their home games at Mackay Stadium.

== Schedule ==
Date	Opponent	Site	Result	Attendance	Source
September 25	San Francisco State	Mackay Stadium; Reno, NV	L 19–39		
October 2	at Chico State	Chico High School Stadium; Chico, CA	L 0–32		
October 16	Fresno State*	Mackay Stadium; Reno, NV	L 6–52	2,500	
October 23	at Cal Aggies	Aggie Field; Davis, CA	W 13–0		
October 29	at San Francisco State*	Cox Stadium; San Francisco, CA	L 0–54		
November 6	Sacramento State^{†}	Mackay Stadium; Reno, NV	W 28–14		
November 13	Humboldt State	Mackay Stadium; Reno, NV	L 14–21		
*Non-conference game; ^{†}Homecoming
