= 1954 Fresno State Bulldogs football team =

American college football season

1954 Fresno State Bulldogs football

CCAA champion
- Conference: California Collegiate Athletic Association
- Record: 7–3 (4–0 CCAA)
- Head coach: Clark Van Galder (3rd season)
- Home stadium: Ratcliffe Stadium

1954 California Collegiate Athletic Association football standings
	Conf.					Overall
Team	W		L		T	W		L		T
Fresno State $	4	–	0	–	0	7	–	3	–	0
Cal Poly	3	–	1	–	0	6	–	4	–	0
San Diego State	2	–	2	–	0	5	–	4	–	0
Santa Barbara	1	–	3	–	0	4	–	5	–	0
Los Angeles State	0	–	4	–	0	2	–	6	–	1
Pepperdine *	0	–	0	–	0	6	–	2	–	0
$ – Conference champion; Pepperdine had a record of 1–2 against conference opponents, but those games did not count in the CCAA standings.

The 1954 Fresno State Bulldogs football team represented Fresno State College—now known as California State University, Fresno—as a member of the California Collegiate Athletic Association (CCAA) during the 1954 college football season. Led by third-year head coach Clark Van Galder, Fresno State compiled an overall record of 7–3 with a mark of 4–0 in conference play, winning the CCAA title. The Bulldogs played home games at Ratcliffe Stadium on the campus of Fresno City College in Fresno, California.

== Schedule ==
Date	Opponent	Site	Result	Attendance	Source
September 25	Hawaii*	Ratcliffe Stadium; Fresno, CA (rivalry)	L 20–25	9,871	
October 2	Los Angeles State	Ratcliffe Stadium; Fresno, CA	W 49–19	5,663	
October 9	Utah State*	Ratcliffe Stadium; Fresno, CA	W 23–13	7,204–9,000	
October 16	at Nevada*	Mackay Stadium (Note: This stadium is the predecessor to the current Mackay Stadium, which was opened for the 1966 season.); Reno, NV	W 52–6	2,500	
October 23	at Santa Barbara	La Playa Stadium; Santa Barbara, CA	W 26–20	5,000	
October 30	at San Diego State	Balboa Stadium; San Diego, CA (rivalry)	W 20–0	12,000	
November 7	Cal Poly	Ratcliffe Stadium; Fresno, CA	W 16–13	12,789	
November 10	San Diego Marines (Note: The Marine Corps Recruit Depot (MCRD) in San Diego fielded a team that played against colleges and other military teams from 1922 to 1964.)*	Ratcliffe Stadium; Fresno, CA	L 0–20	6,339	
November 19	at San Jose State*	Spartan Stadium; San Jose, CA (rivalry)	L 0–28	10,000–10,001	
November 26	San Francisco State*	Ratcliffe Stadium; Fresno, CA	W 39–20	4,085	
*Non-conference game
