= 1954 Los Angeles State Diablos football team =

American college football season

1954 Los Angeles State Diablos football
- Conference: California Collegiate Athletic Association
- Record: 2–6–1 (0–4 CCAA)
- Head coach: Leonard Adams (4th season)
- Captain: Walt E. Ambord
- Home stadium: Snyder Stadium

1954 California Collegiate Athletic Association football standings
	Conf.					Overall
Team	W		L		T	W		L		T
Fresno State $	4	–	0	–	0	7	–	3	–	0
Cal Poly	3	–	1	–	0	6	–	4	–	0
San Diego State	2	–	2	–	0	5	–	4	–	0
Santa Barbara	1	–	3	–	0	4	–	5	–	0
Los Angeles State	0	–	4	–	0	2	–	6	–	1
Pepperdine *	0	–	0	–	0	6	–	2	–	0
$ – Conference champion; Pepperdine had a record of 1–2 against conference opponents, but those games did not count in the CCAA standings.

The 1954 Los Angeles State Diablos football team represented Los Angeles State College—now known as California State University, Los Angeles—as a member of the California Collegiate Athletic Association (CCAA) during the 1954 college football season. Led by fourth-year head coach Leonard Adams, Los Angeles State compiled an overall record of 2–6–1 with a mark of 0–4 in conference play, placing last out of five teams in the CCAA. The Diablos played home games at Snyder Stadium in Los Angeles.

== Schedule ==
Date	Time	Opponent	Site	Result	Attendance	Source
September 24		Occidental*	Snyder Field; Los Angeles, CA	T 6–6		
October 2		at Fresno State	Ratcliffe Stadium; Fresno, CA	L 19–49	5,663	
October 8	8:00 pm	Caltech*	Snyder Field; Los Angeles, CA	W 20–12		
October 15	8:00 pm	Santa Barbara	Snyder Field; Los Angeles, CA	L 6–9		
October 23	2:00 pm	at San Diego State	Aztec Bowl; San Diego, CA	L 0–38	7,000	
October 30		at La Verne*	Bonita High School?; La Verne, CA	W 13–7		
November 6		at Whittier*	Memorial Stadium; Whittier, CA	L 0–21		
November 12	8:00 pm	Cal Poly	Snyder Field; Los Angeles, CA	L 0–47		
November 19	8:00 pm	at Pepperdine*	El Camino Stadium; Torrance, CA ("Old Shoe" rivalry)	L 0–6		
*Non-conference game
