= Jake Lawlor (American football) =

American football coach (1907–1980)

Biographical details
- Born: July 27, 1907; Victor, Iowa, U.S.
- Died: July 11, 1980 (aged 72); Reno, Nevada, U.S.

Playing career

Football
- 1926–1929: Nevada

Coaching career (HC unless noted)

Football
- 1952–1954: Nevada

Basketball
- 1942–1943: Nevada
- 1945–1959: Nevada

Baseball
- 1957–1960: Nevada

Administrative career (AD unless noted)
- 1951–1969: Nevada

Head coaching record
- Overall: 6–10 (football); 204–156 (basketball)

Glenn Joseph "Jake" Lawlor (July 27, 1907 – July 11, 1980) was an American football player, coach of football, basketball, and baseball and college athletics administrator. He served as the head football coach at the University of Nevada, Reno from 1952 to 1954, compiling a record of 6–10. Lawlor was also the head basketball coach at Nevada in 1942–43 and again from 1945 to 1959, amassing a record of 204–156. He was Nevada's head baseball coach from 1957 to 1960 and the school's athletic director from 1951 to 1969.

Lawlor died on July 11, 1980, at the age of 72, following treatment at St. Mary's Hospital in Reno for cancer. Opened in 1983, Lawlor Events Center on the University of Nevada, Reno campus, is named for him.

== Head coaching record ==
=== Football ===
Year	Team	Overall	Conference	Standing	Bowl/playoffs
Nevada Wolf Pack (Independent) (1952–1953)
1952	Nevada	2–2			
1953	Nevada	2–3			
Nevada Wolf Pack (Far Western Conference) (1954)
1954	Nevada	2–5	2–3	4th	
Nevada:		6–10	2–3		
Total:		6–10			
