= 1954 San Diego State Aztecs football team =

American college football season

1954 San Diego State Aztecs football
- Conference: California Collegiate Athletic Association
- Record: 5–4 (2–2 CCAA)
- Head coach: Bill Schutte (8th season)
- Home stadium: Aztec Bowl, Balboa Stadium

1954 California Collegiate Athletic Association football standings
	Conf.					Overall
Team	W		L		T	W		L		T
Fresno State $	4	–	0	–	0	7	–	3	–	0
Cal Poly	3	–	1	–	0	6	–	4	–	0
San Diego State	2	–	2	–	0	5	–	4	–	0
Santa Barbara	1	–	3	–	0	4	–	5	–	0
Los Angeles State	0	–	4	–	0	2	–	6	–	1
Pepperdine *	0	–	0	–	0	6	–	2	–	0
$ – Conference champion; Pepperdine had a record of 1–2 against conference opponents, but those games did not count in the CCAA standings.

The 1954 San Diego State Aztecs football team represented San Diego State College (Note: San Diego State University was known as San Diego State College from 1935 to 1971.) during the 1954 college football season.

San Diego State competed in the California Collegiate Athletic Association (CCAA). The team was led by eighth-year head coach Bill Schutte, and played home games at both Aztec Bowl and Balboa Stadium. They finished the season with five wins and four losses (5–4, 2–2 CCAA). Overall, the team outscored its opponents 177–141 for the season.

== Schedule ==
Date	Opponent	Site	Result	Attendance	Source
September 25	New Mexico*	Balboa Stadium; San Diego, CA	L 7–28	12,500	
October 2	at Cal Poly	Mustang Stadium; San Luis Obispo, CA	L 14–26		
October 8	at San Francisco State*	Cox Stadium; San Francisco, CA	L 10–12	5,500	
October 16	at San Diego Marines (Note: The Marine Corps Recruit Depot (MCRD) in San Diego fielded a team that played against colleges and other military teams from 1922 to 1964.)*	Balboa Stadium; San Diego, CA	W 14–0	7,000	
October 23	Los Angeles State^{†}	Aztec Bowl; San Diego, CA	W 38–0	7,000	
October 30	Fresno State	Balboa Stadium; San Diego, CA (rivalry)	L 0–20	12,000	
November 13	Pepperdine*	Aztec Bowl; San Diego, CA	W 20–13	5,000	
November 20	at Santa Barbara	La Playa Stadium; Santa Barbara, CA	W 33–14	5,000	
November 27	Whittier*	Aztec Bowl; San Diego, CA	W 41–28	4,000	
*Non-conference game; ^{†}Homecoming

== Team players in the NFL ==
The following San Diego State players were selected in the 1955 NFL draft.

Player	Position	Round	Overall	NFL team
Bob Newton	Guard	17	202	San Francisco 49ers
