= 1954 Cal Poly Mustangs football team =

American college football season

1954 Cal Poly Mustangs football
- Conference: California Collegiate Athletic Association
- Record: 6–4 (3–1 CCAA)
- Head coach: LeRoy Hughes (5th season)
- Home stadium: Mustang Stadium

1954 California Collegiate Athletic Association football standings
	Conf.					Overall
Team	W		L		T	W		L		T
Fresno State $	4	–	0	–	0	7	–	3	–	0
Cal Poly	3	–	1	–	0	6	–	4	–	0
San Diego State	2	–	2	–	0	5	–	4	–	0
Santa Barbara	1	–	3	–	0	4	–	5	–	0
Los Angeles State	0	–	4	–	0	2	–	6	–	1
Pepperdine *	0	–	0	–	0	6	–	2	–	0
$ – Conference champion; Pepperdine had a record of 1–2 against conference opponents, but those games did not count in the CCAA standings.

The 1954 Cal Poly Mustangs football team represented California Polytechnic State College—now known as California Polytechnic State University, San Luis Obispo—as a member of the California Collegiate Athletic Association (CCAA) during the 1954 college football season. Led by fifth-year head coach LeRoy Hughes, Cal Poly compiled an overall record of 6–4 with a mark of 3–1 in conference play, placing second in the CCAA. The team outscored its opponents 221 to 141 for the season. The Mustangs played home games at Mustang Stadium in San Luis Obispo, California.

== Schedule ==
Date	Opponent	Site	Result	Attendance	Source
September 18	San Diego Marines (Note: The Marine Corps Recruit Depot (MCRD) in San Diego fielded a team that played against colleges and other military teams from 1922 to 1964.)*	Mustang Stadium; San Luis Obispo, CA	L 3–23		
September 25	at Willamette*	McCulloch Stadium; Salem, OR	W 19–12		
October 2	San Diego State	Mustang Stadium; San Luis Obispo, CA	W 26–14		
October 8	at Santa Barbara	La Playa Stadium; Santa Barbara, CA	W 47–6		
October 16	San Francisco State*	Mustang Stadium; San Luis Obispo, CA	W 19–0		
October 23	at McMurry*	Indian Stadium; Abilene, TX	L 14–49		
November 6	at Fresno State	Ratcliffe Stadium; Fresno, CA	L 13–16	12,789	
November 12	at Los Angeles State	Snyder Field; Los Angeles, CA	W 47–0		
November 19	Humboldt State*	Mustang Stadium; San Luis Obispo, CA	W 13–0		
November 25	Western State (CO)*	Mustang Stadium; San Luis Obispo, CA	L 20–21		
*Non-conference game

== Team players in the NFL ==
The following were selected in the 1955 NFL draft.

Player	Position	Round	Overall	NFL team
Bob Heaston	Guard	24	285	San Francisco 49ers
Perry Jeter	Halfback	26	311	Chicago Bears
