= Fremont Weir Wildlife Area =

Protected area in California

Coordinates: 38.75°N 121.65°W

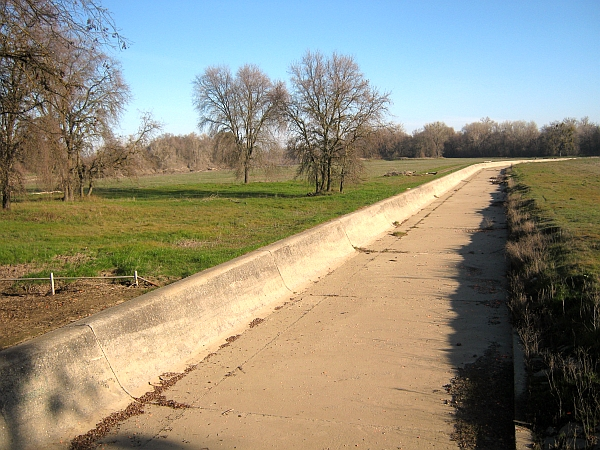
Fremont Weir

Fremont Weir Wildlife Area is 1,461 acres (591 ha) at the north end of the Yolo Bypass floodway along the Sacramento River in Sutter County and Yolo County. It is 6 miles north-east of the city of Woodland and 15 miles north of Yolo Bypass Wildlife Area and the nearby Sacramento Bypass Wildlife Area. Whenever water in the river exceeds the height of the weir the excess flow runs over the weir and down the Yolo Bypass floodway, thereby reducing the risks of flooding in the city of Sacramento and nearby urban areas along the river.

This flat, level Central Valley riparian habitat has an average elevation of 25 feet above sea level. It provides habitat for valley oaks, willows, sycamore, cottonwood trees, muskrat, river otter, pheasant, valley quail and waterfowl. Access from the east side by driving North from Highway 5 along the old river road on the west right descending bank side of the Sacramento River to Yolo County Road 16, then west on road 16 to east left descending bank levee of the Yolo Bypass. Road 16 is not paved and may be muddy during rainy season. Park where indicated on levee. Access from the west side is difficult. One may drive in from Knights Landing on Yolo County Road 16 and 16A. However, at the eastern end of 16A one will encounter a locked gate, which may be walked around
