= Causeway Classic =

American college football rivalry

- Sacramento State UC Davis
- Sport: Football
- First meeting: October 9, 1954; Northern Branch 14, Sacramento State 0
- Latest meeting: November 22, 2025; UC Davis 31, Sacramento State 27
- Next meeting: TBD
- Trophy: Causeway Classic Trophy

Statistics
- Total meetings: 72
- All-time series: UC Davis leads 49–23
- Regular season series: UC Davis leads 49–22
- Postseason results: Sacramento State, 1–0; November 19, 1988: Sacramento State 35, UC Davis 14
- Trophy series: UC Davis leads 46–19
- Largest victory: UC Davis, 51–6 (1982)
- Longest win streak: UC Davis: 18 (1970–1987); Sacramento State: 5 (1988–1991)
- Current win streak: UC Davis, 3 (2023–present)

Locations in Northern California

The Causeway Classic is the annual college football game between the Sacramento State Hornets and the UC Davis Aggies in the United States. The teams exchange a Causeway Classic Trophy made from cement taken from the Yolo Causeway.

With Sac State's departure from the Big Sky Conference after the end of the 2025 NCAA Division I FCS football season to the Mid American Conference, the rivalry was put on hold due to being a non-protected out of conference matchup.

== History of the game ==
The two teams first played each other in 1954, when the Davis campus was still officially known as the College of Agriculture at Davis, and have played every year since, including twice in 1988 when they met in the NCAA Division II playoffs. Games hosted by UC Davis are held at UC Davis Health Stadium. Games hosted by Sacramento State are held at Hornet Stadium.

The name "Causeway Classic" was introduced in the early 1980s and is credited to former Sacramento State sports information director Mike Duncan. It refers to the Yolo Causeway, a causeway over the Yolo Bypass on Interstate 80, which connects Davis and Sacramento, California.

== Trophy ==
A trophy made from a concrete core sample taken from the Yolo Causeway is awarded to the winner.

For a few decades starting in 1961, the winning team received the Causeway Carriage, an authentic 19th century carriage, as the trophy. Today, the Carriage is no longer exchanged between the two teams. The carriage was donated by Sac State alumnus Jeri Striezik in 1960 to serve as the perpetual trophy for the schools. It was refurbished at the prison in Folsom, California. It was transported to the winning campus at the losing school's expense.

== Football ==
UC Davis leads the trophy series with 46 wins to Sacramento State's 19. UC Davis also leads all-time in games between the two, 49 to 23. One of Sacramento State's victories was a playoff game between the two schools in 1988.

Ken O'Brien was the first player to play for both teams in the rivalry.

=== Game results ===
UC Davis victories	Sacramento State victories

No.	Date	Location	Winner	Score
1	October 9, 1954	Sacramento	UC Davis	14–0
2	October 15, 1955	Davis	UC Davis	29–0
3	October 13, 1956	Sacramento	UC Davis	33–26
4	November 17, 1957	Davis	Sacramento State	29–0
5	November 15, 1958	Sacramento	UC Davis	22–14
6	November 14, 1959	Davis	Sacramento State	21–6
7	November 19, 1960	Sacramento	Sacramento State	31–0
8	November 17, 1961	Davis	UC Davis	14–0
9	November 17, 1962	Sacramento	Sacramento State	26–7
10	November 16, 1963	Davis	UC Davis	17–8
11	November 14, 1964	Sacramento	Sacramento State	27–0
12	November 5, 1965	Davis	UC Davis	20–14
13	October 29, 1966	Sacramento	Sacramento State	34–26
14	October 20, 1967	Davis	Sacramento State	23–6
15	October 12, 1968	Sacramento	Sacramento State	24–7
16	October 4, 1969	Davis	Sacramento State	18–10
17	November 21, 1970	Sacramento	UC Davis	28–0
18	November 13, 1971	Davis	UC Davis	24–17
19	November 4, 1972	Sacramento	UC Davis	17–16
20	October 27, 1973	Davis	UC Davis	24–15
21	October 26, 1974	Sacramento	#14 UC Davis	22–17
22	October 18, 1975	Davis	UC Davis	38–3
23	October 23, 1976	Sacramento	UC Davis	34–0
24	October 15, 1977	Davis	UC Davis	28–0
25	October 14, 1978	Sacramento	#6 UC Davis	39–0
26	October 6, 1979	Davis	UC Davis	32–7
27	October 4, 1980	Sacramento	UC Davis	16–6
28	November 21, 1981	Davis	UC Davis	21–13
29	November 13, 1982	Davis	#3 UC Davis	51–6
30	November 12, 1983	Sacramento	#1 UC Davis	52–14
31	November 17, 1984	Davis	#6 UC Davis	38–21
32	November 23, 1985	Sacramento	#1 UC Davis	37–30
33	November 15, 1986	Davis	#2 UC Davis	29–6
34	November 14, 1987	Sacramento	#14 UC Davis	28–10
35	September 24, 1988	Davis	Sacramento State	31–28
36	November 19, 1988 (Note: 1988 Playoff game)	Davis	Sacramento State	35–14
37	September 23, 1989	Sacramento	Sacramento State	21–20

No.	Date	Location	Winner	Score
38	September 22, 1990	Sacramento	Sacramento State	16–12
39	October 5, 1991	Sacramento	#10 Sacramento State	50–18
40	October 3, 1992	Sacramento	UC Davis	21–14
41	November 13, 1993	Sacramento	#7 UC Davis	47–32
42	October 8, 1994	Davis	#16 UC Davis	27–24
43	October 28, 1995	Sacramento	UC Davis	52–42
44	September 21, 1996	Davis	Sacramento State	27–24
45	September 20, 1997	Sacramento	UC Davis	36–28
46	September 19, 1998	Davis	#2 UC Davis	35–17
47	September 18, 1999	Sacramento	Sacramento State	48–27
48	October 28, 2000	Sacramento	#1 UC Davis	13–10
49	October 27, 2001	Sacramento	#15 UC Davis	43–0
50	October 5, 2002	Sacramento	#9 UC Davis	38–21
51	October 4, 2003	Sacramento	UC Davis	31–27
52	September 25, 2004	Davis	UC Davis	58–23
53	September 24, 2005	Sacramento	UC Davis	37–7
54	November 18, 2006	Davis	UC Davis	30–16
55	November 3, 2007	Sacramento	UC Davis	31–26
56	November 8, 2008	Davis	Sacramento State	29–19
57	November 21, 2009	Sacramento	Sacramento State	31–28
58	November 20, 2010	Davis	UC Davis	17–16
59	November 19, 2011	Sacramento	UC Davis	23–19
60	November 17, 2012	Davis	UC Davis	34–27
61	November 23, 2013	Sacramento	UC Davis	34–7
62	November 22, 2014	Davis	Sacramento State	41–30
63	November 21, 2015	Sacramento	UC Davis	35–21
64	November 19, 2016	Davis	UC Davis	48–30
65	November 18, 2017	Sacramento	Sacramento State	52–47
66	November 17, 2018	Reno (Note: Game in Davis was moved to Reno due to unhealthy air quality as a result of the Camp Fire in Northern California.)	#9 UC Davis	56–13
67	November 23, 2019	Sacramento	#4 Sacramento State	27–17
68	November 20, 2021	Davis	#11 Sacramento State	27–7
69	November 19, 2022	Sacramento	#2 Sacramento State	27–21
70	November 18, 2023	Davis	UC Davis	31–21
71	November 23, 2024	Sacramento	#5 UC Davis	42–39
72	November 22, 2025	Davis	#15 UC Davis	31–27
Series: UC Davis leads 49–23

== Men's basketball ==
- Note: NCAA Division I play only
- Series table does not include results prior to the 1949–50 NCAA men's basketball season

Sacramento State victories	UC Davis victories	Tie games

No.	Date	Location	Winning team		Losing team	
1	March 1, 2008	Davis, CA	UC Davis	83	Sacramento State	77
2	December 3, 2008	Sacramento, CA	Sacramento State	82	UC Davis	70
3	December 2, 2009	Davis, CA	Sacramento State	59	UC Davis	57
4	November 23, 2010	Sacramento, CA	UC Davis	61	Sacramento State	54
5	November 22, 2011	Davis, CA	Sacramento State	69	UC Davis	61
6	November 20, 2012	Sacramento, CA	UC Davis	87	Sacramento State	76
7	November 26, 2013	Davis, CA	Sacramento State	73	UC Davis	67
8	November 24, 2015	Sacramento, CA	Sacramento State	84	UC Davis	79
9	December 2, 2015	Davis, CA	UC Davis	66	Sacramento State	61
10	November 21, 2016	Sacramento, CA	UC Davis	81	Sacramento State	72
11	November 21, 2017	Sacramento, CA	UC Davis	64	Sacramento State	47
12	November 20, 2018	Sacramento, CA	Sacramento State	58	UC Davis	55
13	November 20, 2019	Sacramento, CA	Sacramento State	61	UC Davis	51
14	November 23, 2021	Sacramento, CA	Sacramento State	75	UC Davis	63
15	November 22, 2022	Sacramento, CA	UC Davis	82	Sacramento State	71
16	November 26, 2023	Davis, CA	Sacramento State	69	UC Davis	63
17	December 14, 2024	Sacramento, CA	UC Davis	69	Sacramento State	62
18	November 14, 2025	Davis, CA	UC Davis	77	Sacramento State	73
19	November 14, 2026	Sacramento, CA	UC Davis	75	Sacramento State	56
Series: UC Davis leads 10–9

== Other sports ==
The two schools also have a "Causeway Classic" all-sports trophy called "The Causeway Cup". Initiated with UCD's move to Division I, the two schools created a trophy for all sports. Each of the schools' 18 common teams (men's and women's) compete for a pre-determined share of either five points, or if the teams play each other more than once a year, points will be divided by how many meetings occur. The school that collects the most points wins the Cup for that season.

In the inaugural cup in 2004–05, UCD claimed the trophy, however, Sacramento State won it in 2005–06 and again in 2006–2007. In 2007–2008, UCD reclaimed the trophy with a total score, however, lost it in 2008-2009 and once more in 2011-2012. Since then UCD has not relinquished the trophy, winning 11 in a row since 2012.

As with football, the Aggie's all sports move to the Mountain West Conference, and the Hornet's move to the Big West Conference, the Cup's future in uncertain.

=== Causeway Cup results ===
UC Davis victories	Sacramento State victories

No.	Date	Winner	Score
1	2004–05	UC Davis	–
2	2005–06	Sacramento State	66.25–38.75
3	2006–07	Sacramento State	52.66–52.34
4	2007–08	UC Davis	67.5–37.5
5	2008–09	Sacramento State	66.67–43.33
6	2009–10	UC Davis	55.83–44.17
7	2010–11	UC Davis	56.25–43.75
8	2011–12	Sacramento State	52.50–47.50
9	2012–13	UC Davis	60.42–39.58
10	2013–14	UC Davis	68.75–31.25
11	2014–15	UC Davis	58.33–31.67

No.	Date	Winner	Score
12	2015–16	UC Davis	53.75–26.25
13	2016–17	UC Davis	65.00–15.00
14	2017–18	UC Davis	42.50–30.00
15	2018–19	UC Davis	62.50–27.50
16	2021†–22	UC Davis	45.00–35.01
17	2022–23	UC Davis	55.85–34.18
18	2023–24	UC Davis	59.18–30.84
19	2024-25	UC Davis	49.80–24.80
20	2025-26^	UC Davis	42.50–7.50
Series: UC Davis leads 16–4

†Cups were not awarded 2020-2021 and 2021-2022 due to Covid-19.
^Current Cup underway, Davis leads with half of the attainable points, leading to a tie or a UC Davis win.

== See also ==
- List of NCAA college football rivalry games
