= Yolo Bypass Wildlife Area =

Protected area in California

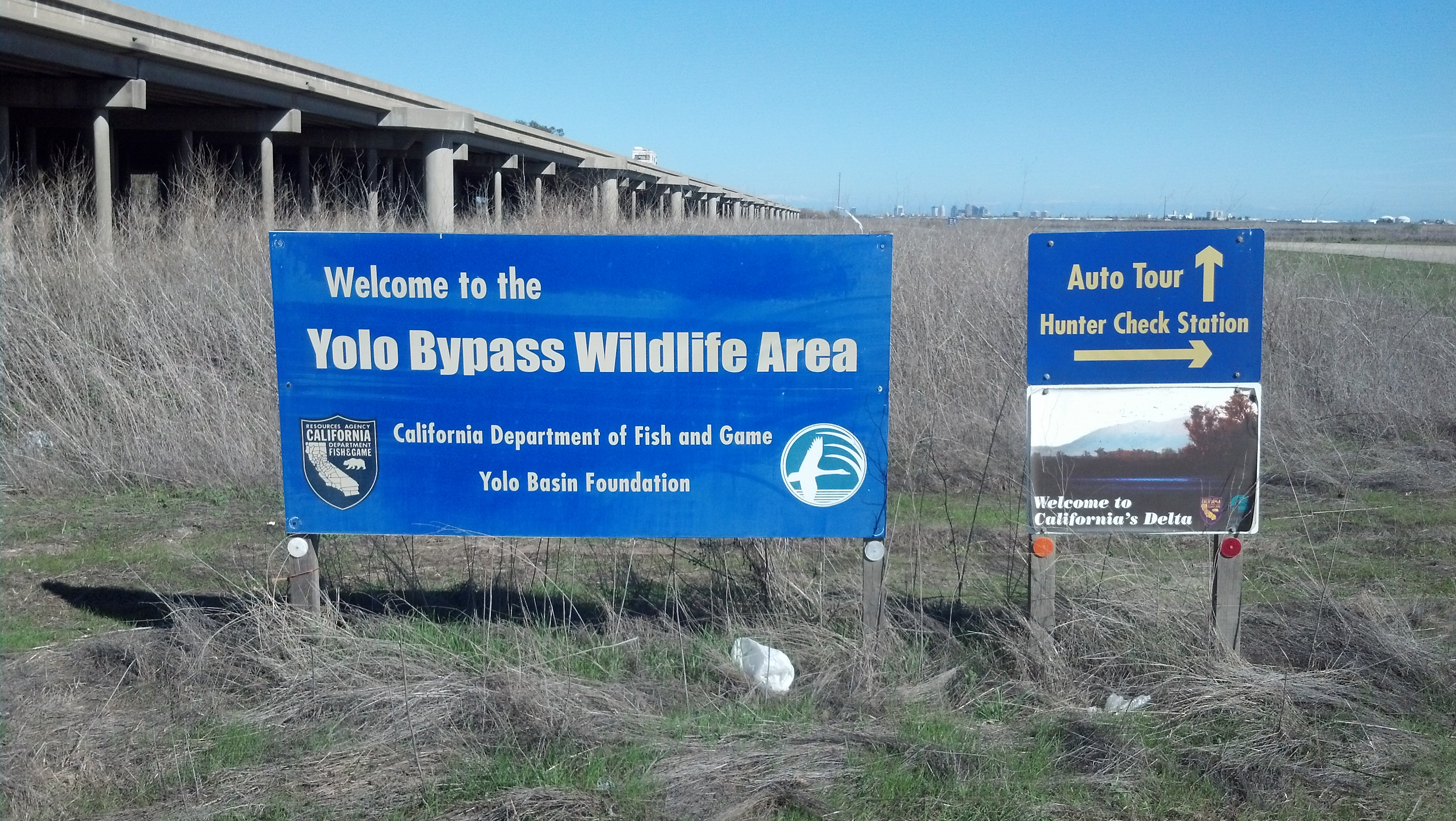
The entrance to the Yolo Bypass Wildlife Area with the Yolo Causeway to the left.

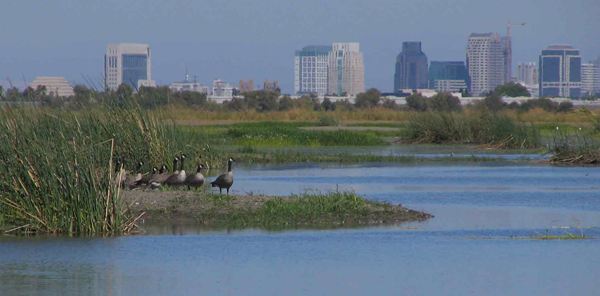
Canada geese at the Yolo Bypass Wildlife Area. Sacramento is on the horizon.

The Yolo Bypass Wildlife Area, located within the Yolo Bypass in Yolo County, California, is managed by the California Department of Fish and Wildlife with the intent of restoring and managing a variety of wildlife habitats in the Yolo Basin, a natural basin in the north part of the Sacramento-San Joaquin River Delta. The creation of the wildlife area was spearheaded by the Yolo Basin Foundation. The California Department of Fish and Wildlife and Yolo Basin Foundation are the core partners in the operation of this resource located at

== History ==
The wildlife area was open to the public in 1997 after extensive restoration efforts completed by Ducks Unlimited with federal funds appropriated through the United States Army Corps of Engineers. In 1999, this 3,700-acre (15 km^{2}) restoration project was named the Vic Fazio Yolo Wildlife Area in honor of congressman Vic Fazio who lobbied hard for the funds needed to build the project. In 2001, the wildlife area expanded to over 16,000 acres (65 km^{2}) with the acquisition of the Glide and Los Rios properties. These acquisitions included the 10,000-acre (40 km^{2}) Tule Ranch, a working cattle ranch with extensive vernal pool areas.

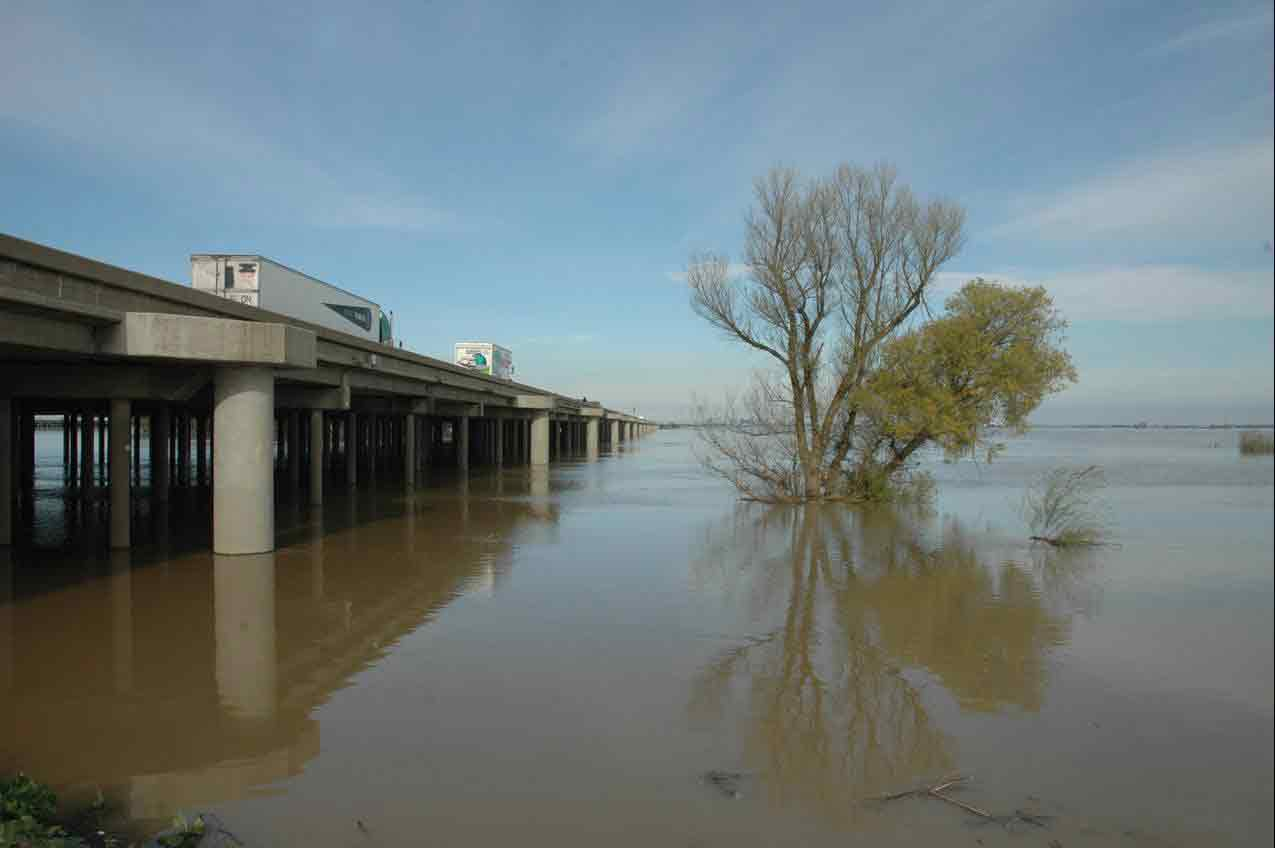
The entrance to the wildlife area during a major flood.

== Habitats, Flora, & Fauna ==
Most wetland in the wildlife area are managed as seasonal wetlands. They go through an extensive dry period during the spring and summer months. Typically, these ponds are drained on April 1 to stimulate the germination of Swamp Timothy. They may receive a brief summer irrigation and then be flooded in September to provide wetland habitat for migratory waterfowl and shorebirds.

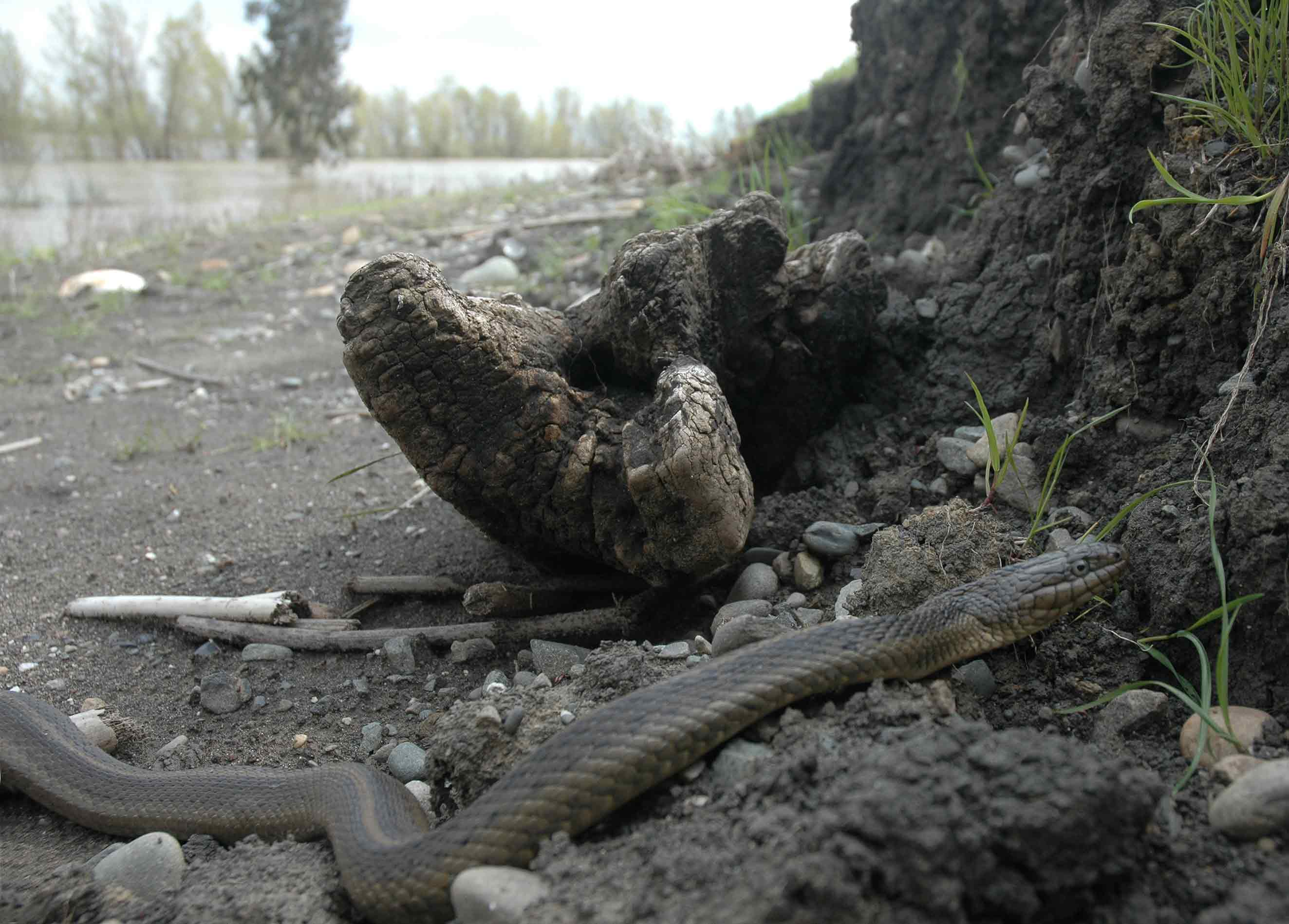
The threatened giant garter snake is found in aquatic habitats in much of the wildlife area.

Permanent wetlands are flooded year round and tend to be deeper and have more emergent vegetation. These ponds provide important brood water for resident aquatic birds such as mallards, common moorhens and pied-billed grebes. They also provide drinking water for wildlife as well as relief from intense summer heat. This habitat is used extensively for roosting by black-crowned night herons, egrets, and white-faced ibis. The giant garter snake also occurs in this habitat.

Upland habitats are used extensively by ground nesting birds such northern harriers, western meadowlarks, mallards and ring-necked pheasant. Vegetation is typically dominated by annual rye grass, curly dock and wild sunflower. Rodent populations in these areas provide prey for large numbers of wintering birds of prey.

Approximately 1,800 acres (7.3 km^{2}) of natural uplands occur in the southwest portion of the wildlife area. There are several vernal pools in this area that are home to such invertebrate species as tadpole shrimp, clam shrimp and the endangered conservancy fairy shrimp. Rare and endangered plants include Heckert's pepperweed and Ferris' alkali milk vetch. Grassland bird species in this area include grasshopper sparrow, Savannah sparrow and burrowing owl.

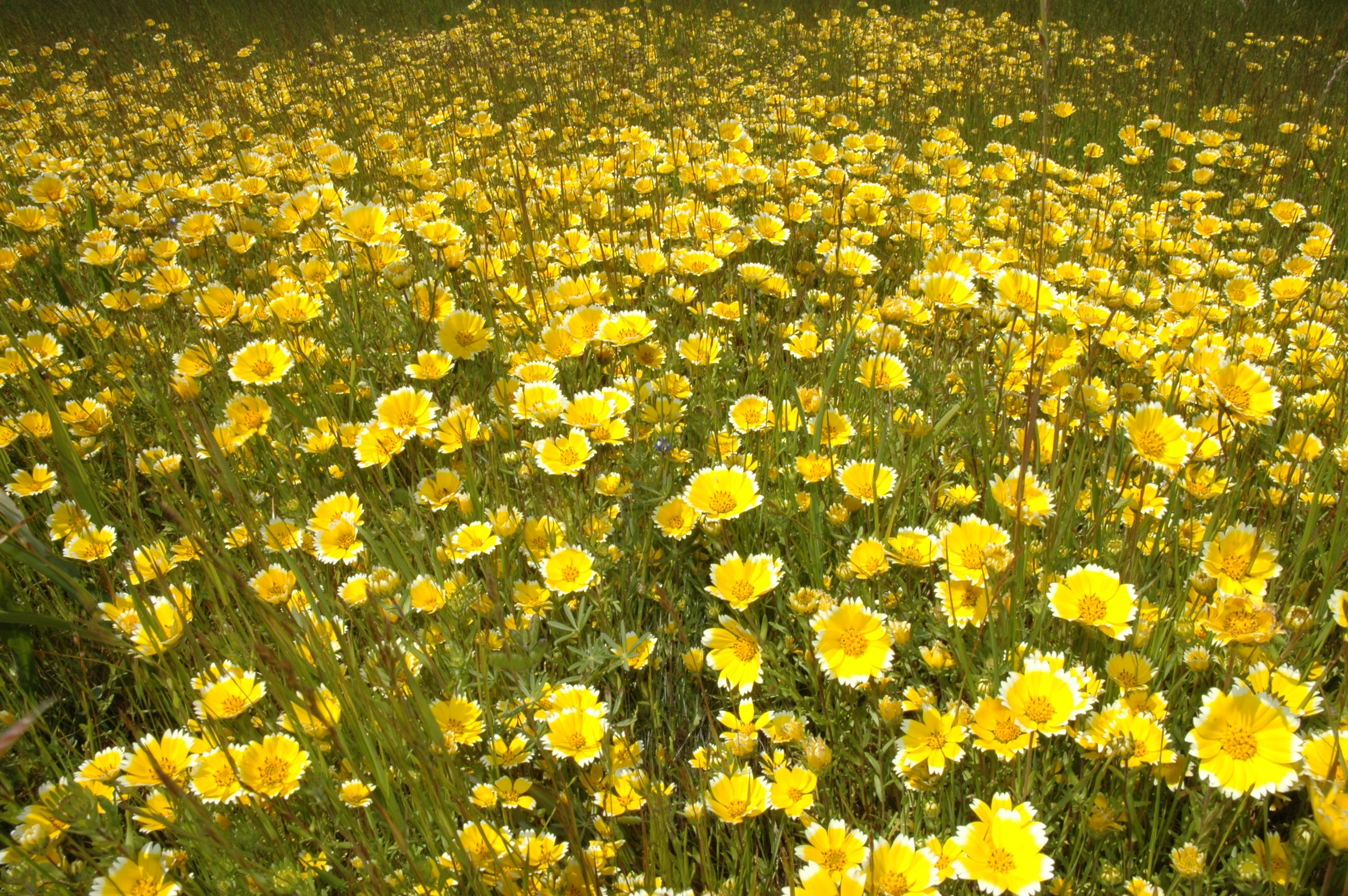
Extensive fields of wildflowers occur in the spring on the Tule Ranch.

Riparian vegetation consists of willows, cottonwoods, black walnut and other tree species. Nesting species here include Swainson's hawks, great-horned owls, wood ducks, tree swallows, and black phoebe. This habitat is very important for neo-tropical migrants such as blue grosbeak, ash-throated flycatchers, and a variety of warbler species. Most riparian vegetation is located along Putah Creek in the central part of the wildlife area.

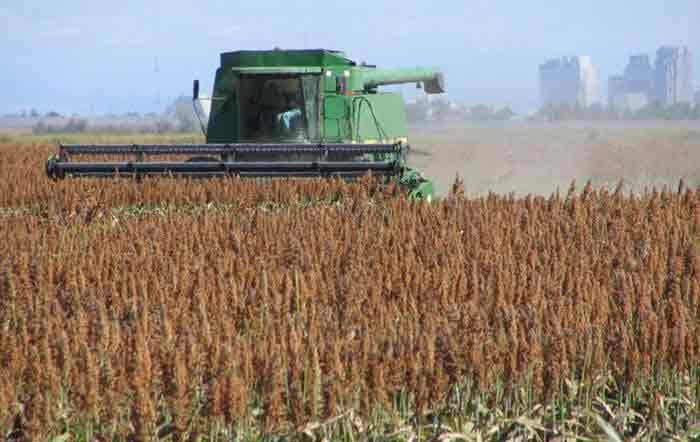
Agriculture is an integral part of the management of the wildlife area.

The Yolo Causeway has one of the largest colonies of bats in the state. Thousands of bats, consisting of Mexican free-tailed bats and two other species, roost under the Interstate 80 structure that crosses over the wildlife area.

== Other uses ==
=== Flood control ===
The Yolo Bypass is a 59,000-acre (240 km^{2}) flood control channel that protects Sacramento and other cities from flooding. The wildlife area was created with the understanding that it would remain completely compatible with this primary flood control function. For this reason, there are restrictions on the density of emergent vegetation and riparian trees within the wildlife area. These standards are determined through the use of hydrological models.

Located at the north end of the Yolo Basin where Putah Creek enters the Yolo Bypass, this part of the Delta is known as the Putah Sinks and hosts a diverse assemblage of wildlife species inhabiting seasonal wetlands, permanent wetlands, riparian forest, uplands, vernal pools and agricultural habitats.

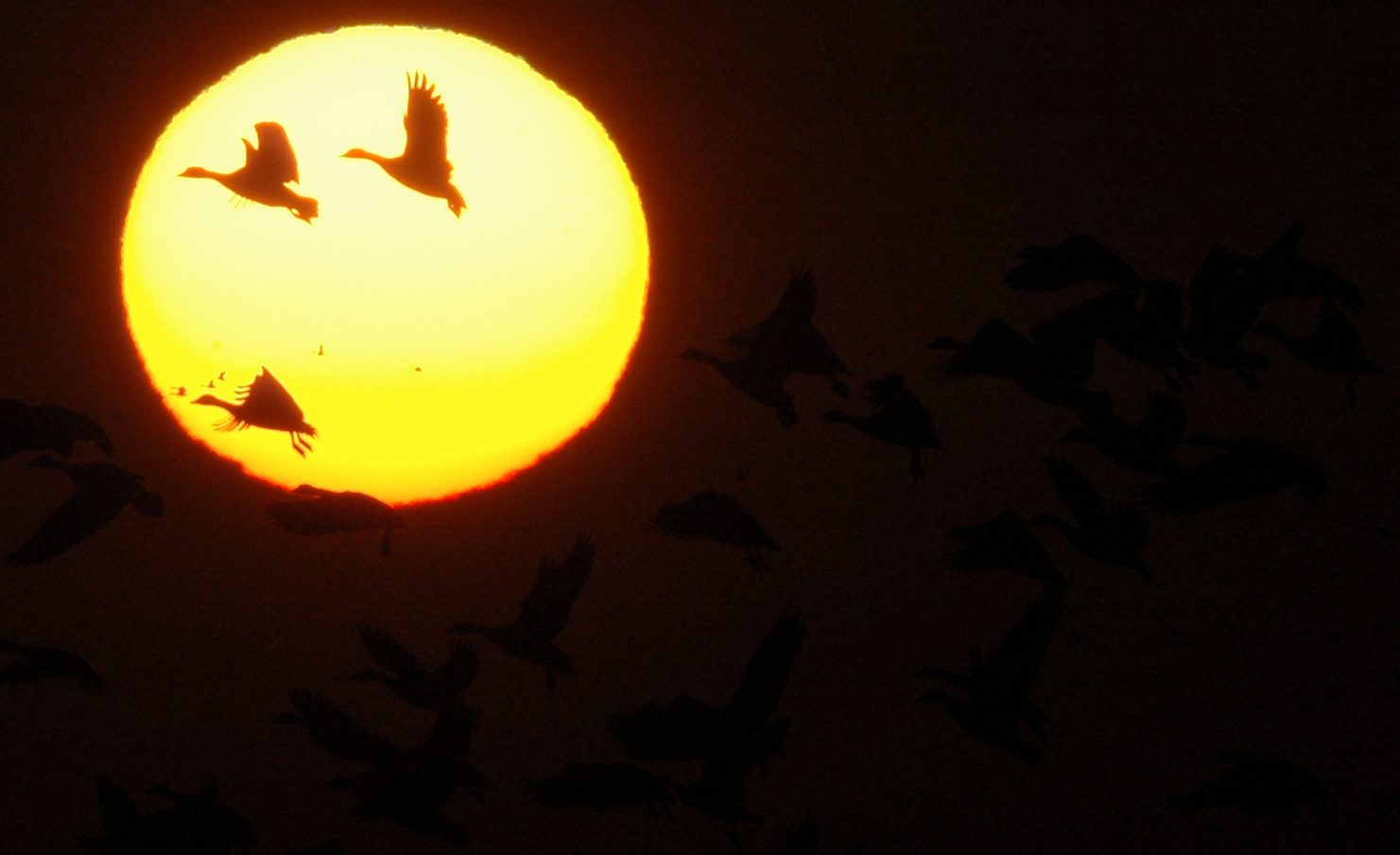
White-fronted geese rising into a November sunrise.

=== Agriculture ===
The extensive use of agriculture achieves its wildlife habitat goals, while providing important operating income. In the northern portions of the wildlife area, rice is grown, which is then flooded after harvest, attracting thousands of waterfowl and shorebirds in view of the automobiles on Interstate 80. Wildlife managers have instituted a crop rotation within the rice fields that allows for a fallow stage every three years. During this fallow stage, the field is managed for migratory shorebirds by flooding during the mid-summer months.

=== Public use ===
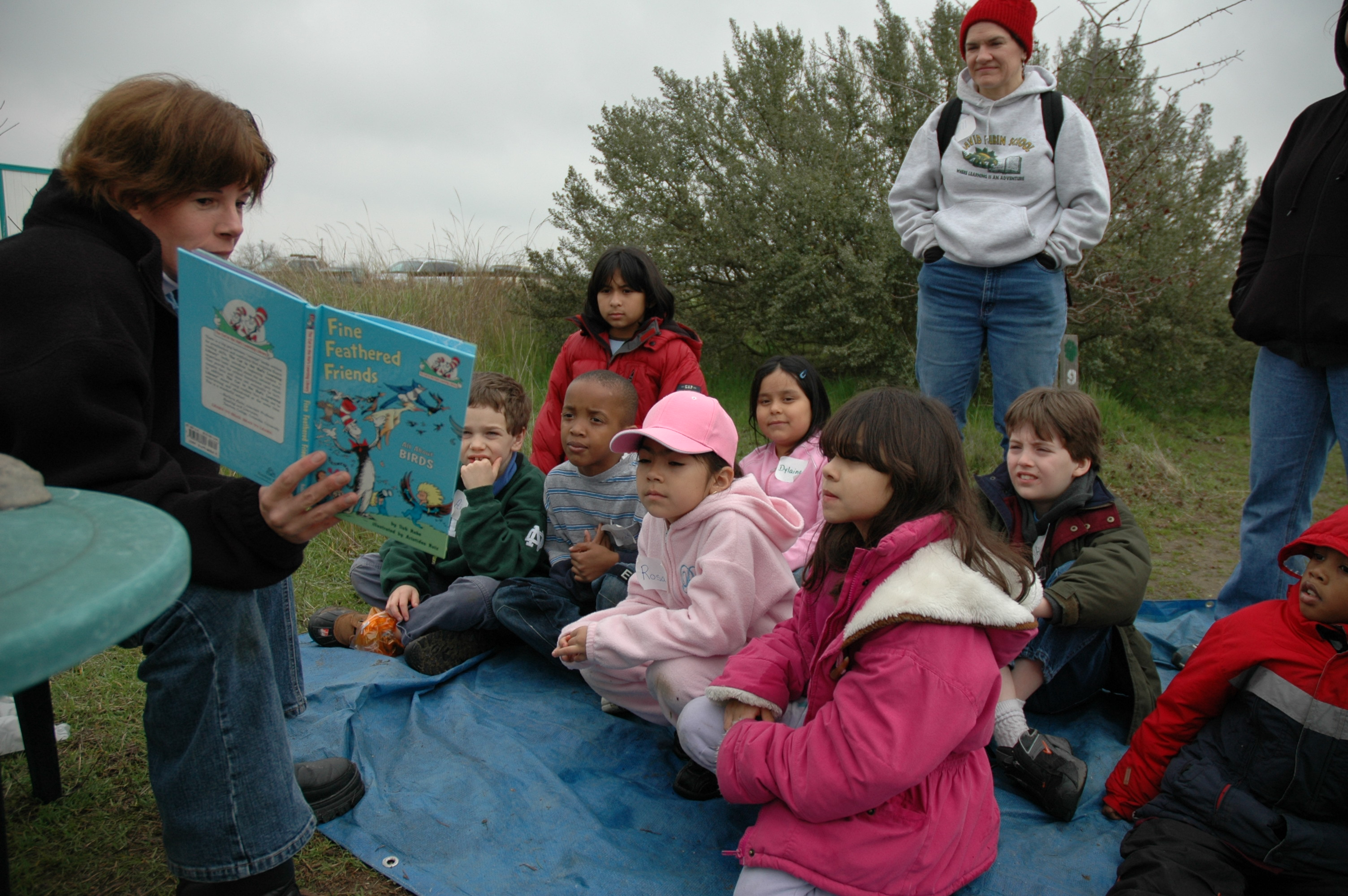
Kids learn about wetlands in the "Discover the Flyway" program.

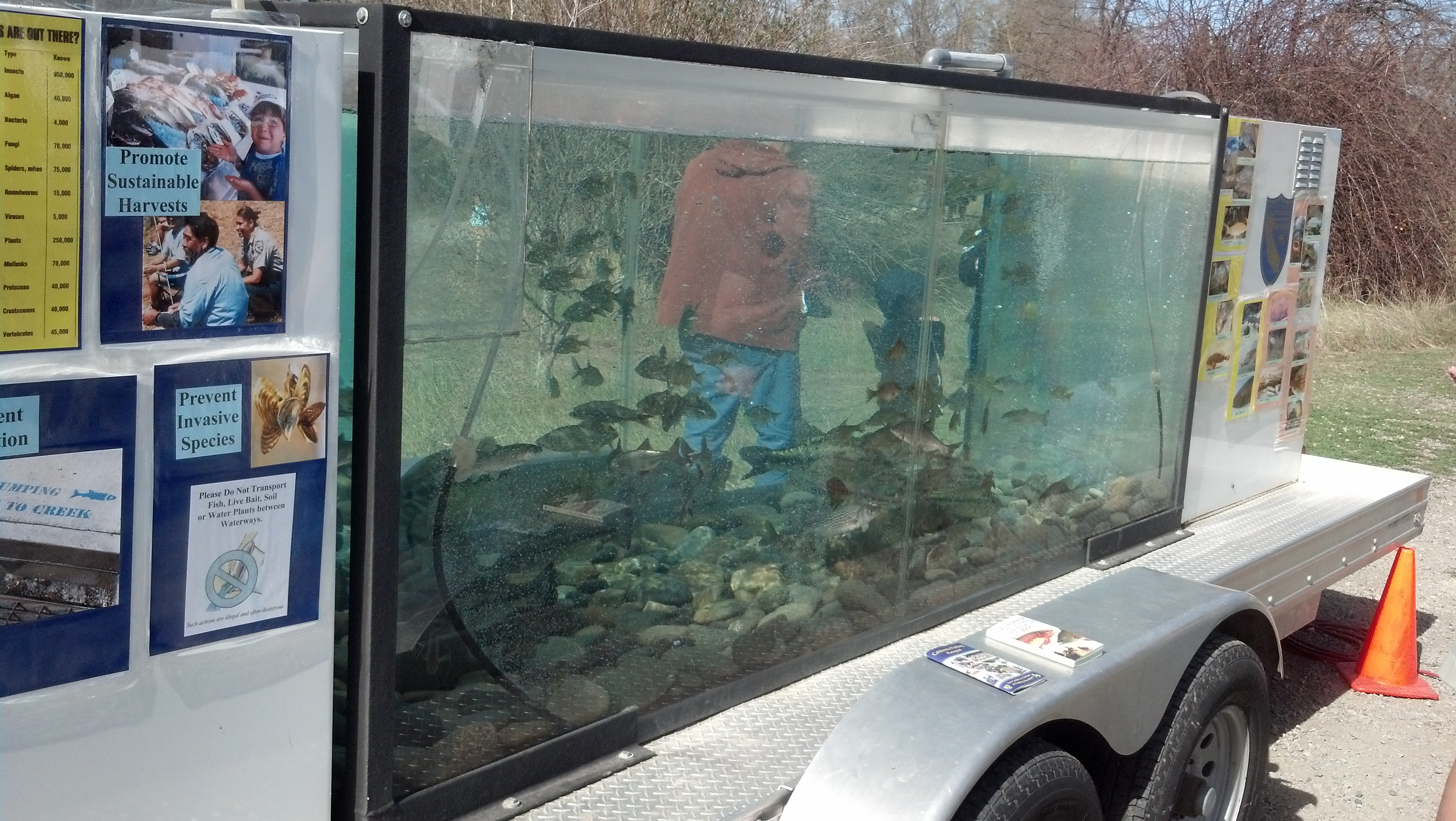
California Department of Fish and Wildlife mobile aquarium at California Duck Days

The wildlife area is open every day (except Christmas) for wildlife viewing and fishing. Tours are conducted by volunteers from the Yolo Basin Foundation. Other public use opportunities are provided by the Yolo Basin Foundation and Fish and Wildlife including bat tours, open houses and a speaker series.

Hunting for waterfowl, pheasant and mourning dove is conducted in specific area by the California Department of Fish and Wildlife during the fall and winter months.

The "Discover the Flyway" environmental education program annually brings approximately 4,000 students per year to learn about wetlands and visit the wildlife area. California Duck Days is an annual wildlife festival held each February, which includes educational exhibits and field trips to observe wildlife. Other activities include trout fishing for children, a mobile aquarium and displays of live captive raptors.

== Tule Ranch ==
This 10,000-acre (40 km^{2}) ranch was purchased in 2001 as part of a large expansion of the wildlife area. It had been owned by the Glide family for over 130 years. Since the acquisition, approximately 5,000 acres (20 km^{2}) of new wetlands have been restored on this property. The western portion of the Tule Ranch contains vernal pools within a mostly natural grassland. Spectacular wildflower displays occur in the spring. Some notable breeding grassland species include grasshopper sparrow, Savannah sparrow and western meadowlark. A prominent landmark in the area is the Umbrella Barn, a large wooden barn that is over 100 years old.

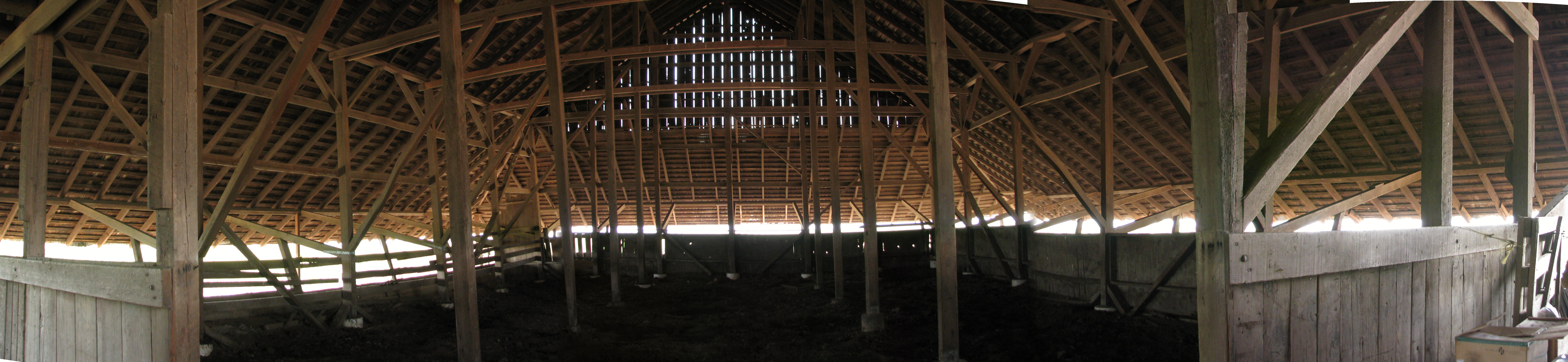
The cathedral like interior of the 100-year-old Umbrella Barn.

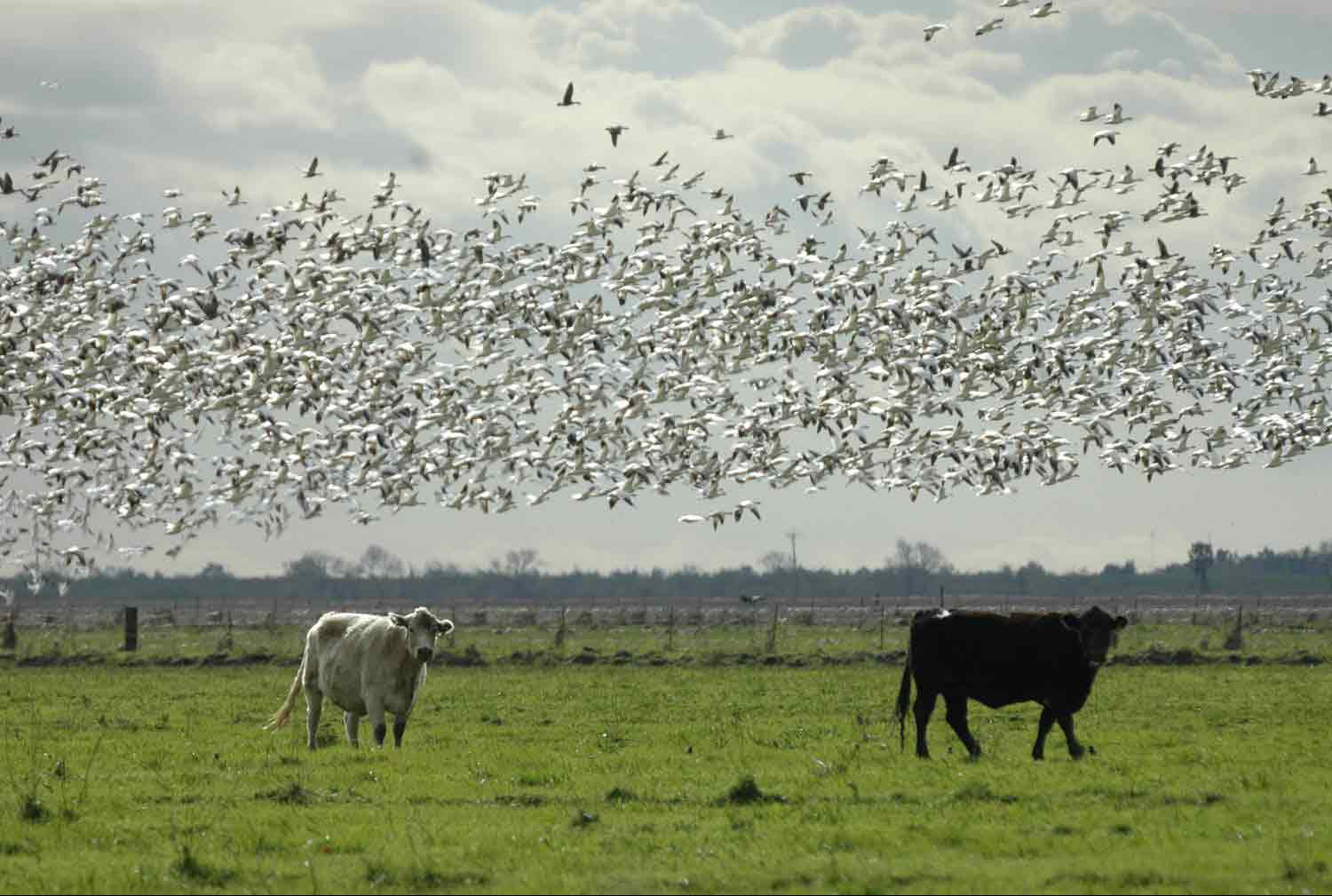
Snow geese descend upon irrigated pasture on the Tule Ranch

The Tule Ranch is host to a large grazing program. Some fields are managed for maximum nutritional value in the form of legumes such as burr clover. These fields also provide important forage for migratory snow geese and white-fronted geese. Cattle are the primary management tool in the vernal pool habitat area. Their removal of thatch from the thick stands of annual rye grass help facilitate the germination of native forbs in this area, resulting in spectacular blooms of wildflowers each spring. At the very bottom of the Tule Ranch is the Fireman's Club, a square mile of property that contains a historic slough that once drained into the Yolo Basin. This section of land was hunted by the Dixon Fire District employees for many years in exchange for their emergency services to the ranch.
