= Yolo Bypass =

Flood bypass in the Sacramento Valley

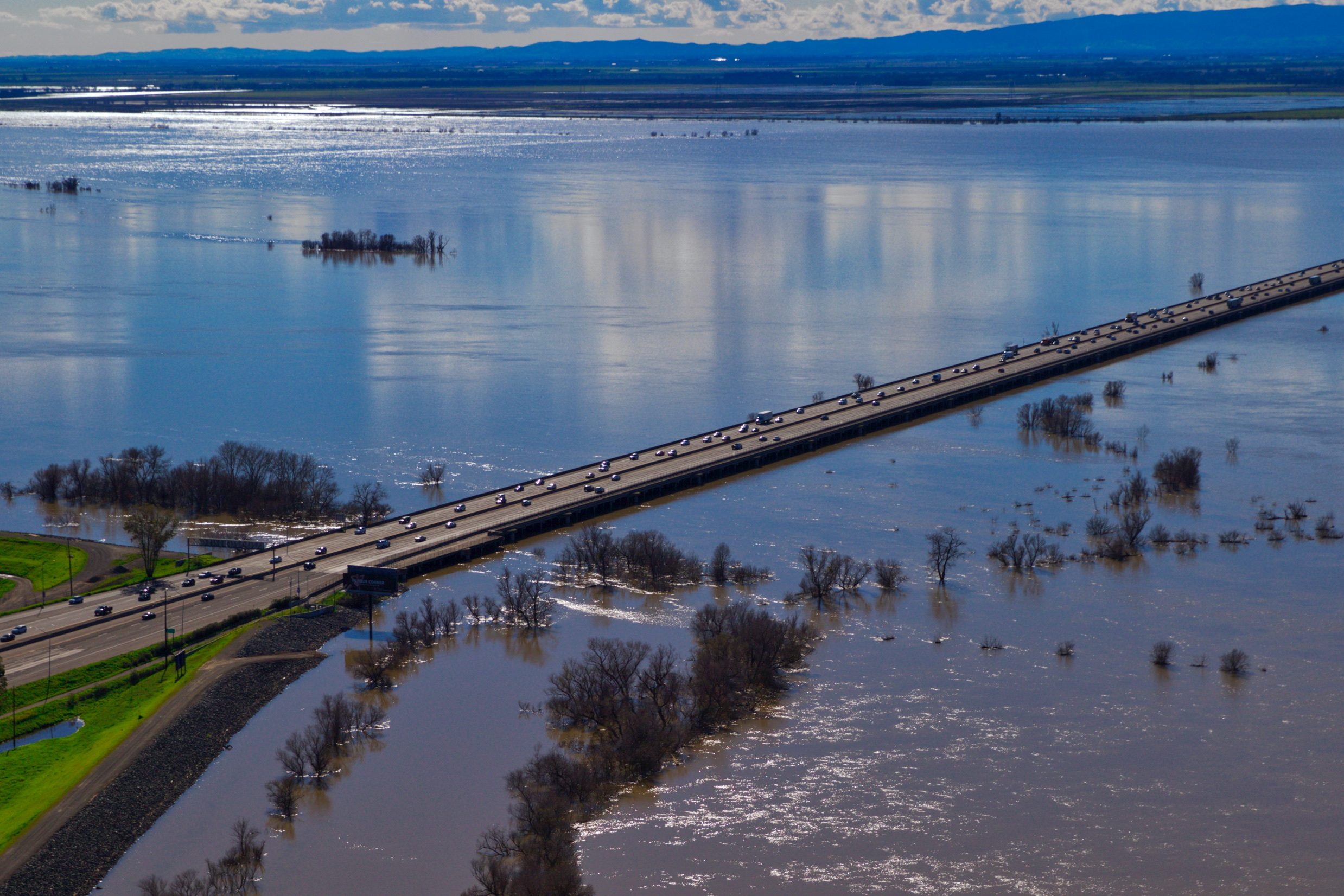
- View of the flooded Yolo Bypass, looking southwest from West Sacramento (2017)

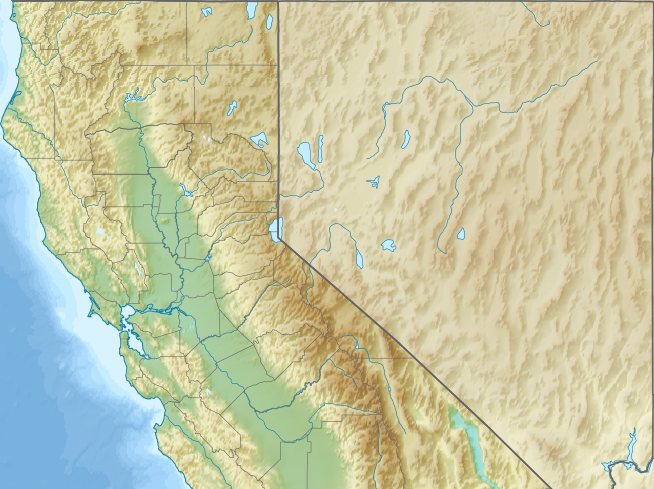
- Location within Northern California
- Coordinates: 38.55°N 121.60°W
- Country: United States
- State: California

Characteristics
- Area: 59,000 acres (24,000 ha)

Hydrology
- Rivers: Sacramento, San Joaquin, American

The Yolo Bypass is one of the two flood bypasses in California's Sacramento Valley located in Yolo and Solano Counties. Through a system of weirs, the bypass diverts floodwaters from the Sacramento River away from the state's capital city of Sacramento and other nearby riverside communities.

During wet years, the bypass can be full of water. The main input to the bypass is through the passive Fremont Weir, where water spills from the Sacramento into the bypass if it reaches the 33.5 feet (10.2 m) crest. Downstream, the Sacramento Weir, just north of the city of West Sacramento, can also be opened to divert additional waters from the Sacramento if needed. From the west, Cache Creek drains into the bypass. The bypass itself runs south, parallel to the Sacramento, and drains into the Sacramento-San Joaquin Delta, a few miles north of Rio Vista.

The bypass is crossed by the Yolo Causeway, a long highway bridge on Interstate 80, linking West Sacramento and the city of Davis, as well as by a rail causeway just north of the Yolo Causeway used by freight and Amtrak trains. To the north, Interstate 5 also crosses the bypass on the Elkhorn Causeway, east of the city of Woodland.

== History ==
Sacramento experienced several severe floods prior to construction of the bypass. The Yolo Basin, a depression formed during the last ice age, would fill up with water during the winter months from seasonal rainfall and runoff into the three rivers surrounding what is now the city of Sacramento (Sacramento, San Joaquin, and American). This created a diverse marsh ecosystem that could last more than 100 days. During the 1800s, seasonal flooding would limit travel and access between cities in the Sacramento River valley.

Destructive floods in 1862 and 1878 prompted various flood control measures, including the 11.5-mile (18.5 km) long Tule Canal (completed in 1864) along the eastern edge of the present-day Yolo Bypass; and the Elkhorn Weir (1897–1917), downstream of the confluence of the Feather and Sacramento Rivers.

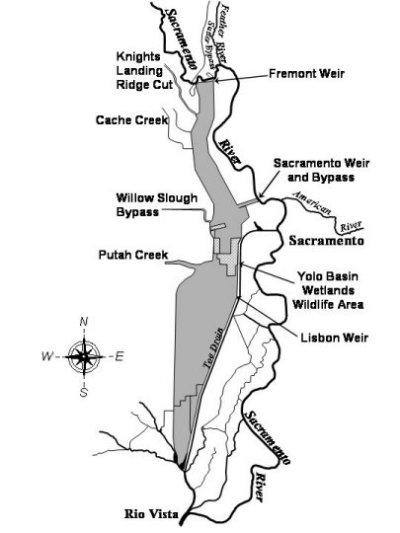
The California Department of Water Resources's schematic map of the Yolo Bypass, 2009.

Congress approved the Sacramento River Flood Control Project in 1911, with a plan to divert the water through multiple weirs and bypasses. The Yolo Bypass is one of two major bypasses in the Sacramento Valley that helps deter urban flooding. The other bypass is the Sutter Bypass, which lies upstream of the Yolo Bypass. The 59,000-acre (24,000 ha) Yolo Bypass floodplain was designed in the early 1930s by the US Army Corps of Engineers.

The Yolo Bypass extends approximately 41 miles (66 km) long, north to south, and 3 miles (4.8 km) wide. The western and eastern edges are defined by levees separated by a distance ranging from 7,000 to 16,000 feet (2,100 to 4,900 m) apart, except for an 8-mile (13 km) long segment immediately south of the mouth of Putah Creek. The two largest sources for the Yolo Bypass are the Sacramento Weir, completed in 1916, and the Fremont Weir, completed in 1929.

== Uses ==
Almost 75% of the Yolo Bypass is privately owned, while the rest belongs to the Yolo Bypass Wildlife Area. Most of the land is used for agriculture during the summer and spring, and the rest makes up marshland. This marshland is ideal for animal habitat, and is also utilized for fishing, hunting, and other recreational activities.

=== Flood control ===
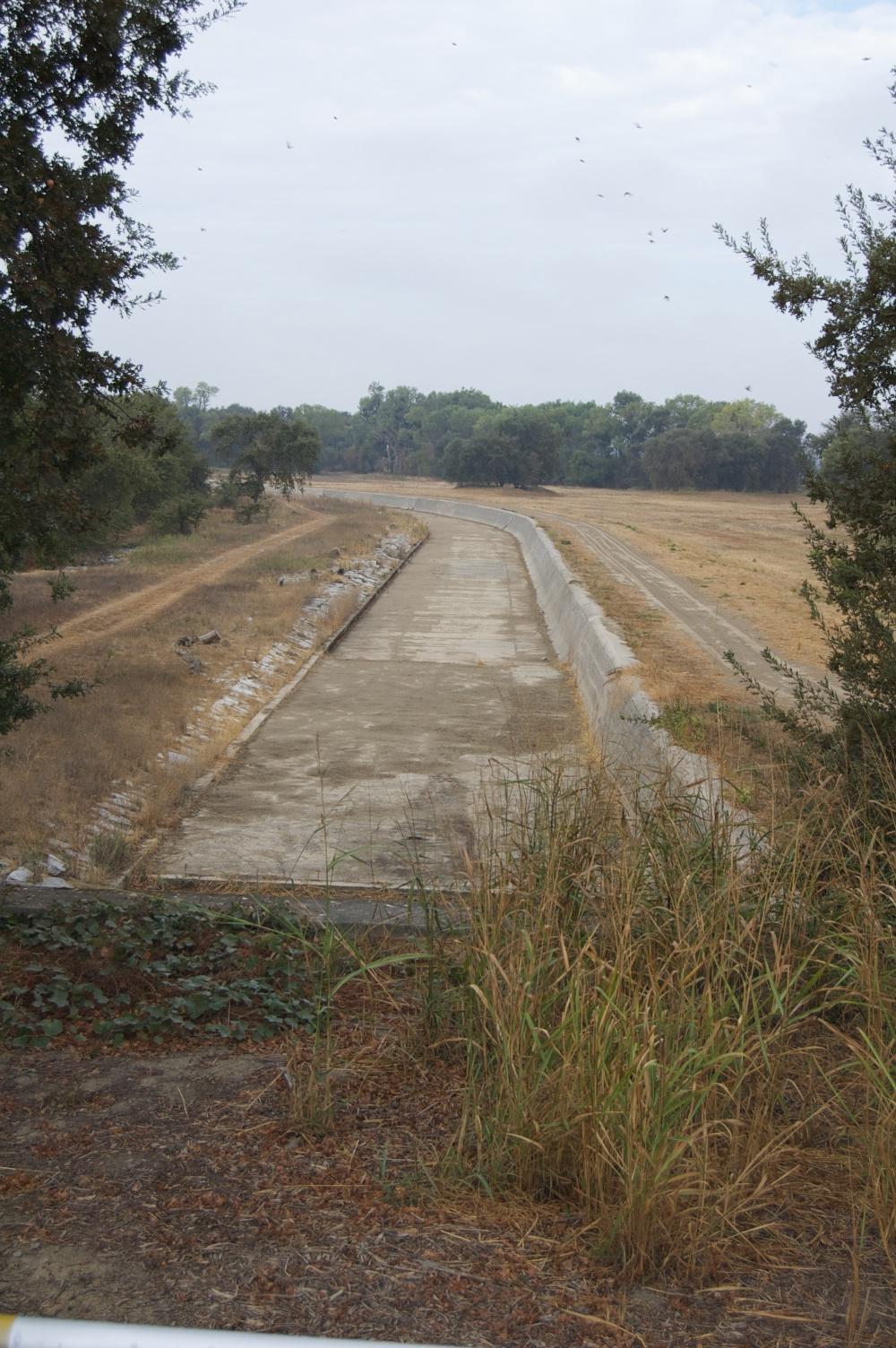
Fremont Weir (2010)

Flood control is the main purpose of the Yolo Bypass. When the flowrate of the Sacramento River exceeds approximately 55,000 cubic feet per second (93,000 m^{3}/min), the excess is released into the Yolo Bypass at the passive Fremont Weir, near that river's confluence with the Feather River. The Fremont Weir, which lies along the south bank of the Sacramento, is about 32 feet (9.8 m) tall, nearly 12 feet (3.7 m) shorter than the levee on the north bank. When the water reaches the 32 feet (9.8 m) mark it starts to flow out into the Yolo Basin.

North of where the Elkhorn Causeway crosses the Yolo Bypass, the Cache Creek flood control basin drains into the Yolo Bypass. The Knights Landing Ridge Cut, where the Colusa Basin Drainage Canal empties, also contributes to the flow in the Yolo Bypass near this point.

There is a second weir just north of West Sacramento, the Sacramento Weir, upstream of the confluence of the Sacramento and American Rivers. The Sacramento Weir is opened manually when the Sacramento River reaches 27.5 feet (8.4 m) at the I Street Bridge. It was built in 1916 by the City of Sacramento and contains 48 gates over its 1,920-foot (590 m) length; water from the Sacramento Weir flows through the 1 mile (1.6 km) long Sacramento Bypass and drains into the Yolo Bypass. The crest of the Sacramento Weir is at 25 feet (7.6 m) and the top of the moveable gates is 31 feet (9.4 m); each gate is 38.1 feet (11.6 m) long.

Yolo Bypass inlets
Name	Location	Capacity	Notes
Moulton Weir	8 miles (13 km) N of Colusa; 100 miles (160 km) N of Sacramento	25,000 ft^{3}/s 42,000 m^{3}/min	Releases from Sacramento River to Butte Basin
Colusa Weir & Bypass	1 mile (1.6 km) N of Colusa; 100 miles (160 km) N of Sacramento	70,000 ft^{3}/s 120,000 m^{3}/min	Releases from Sacramento River to Butte Basin
Tisdale Weir & Bypass	10 miles (16 km) SE of Meridian; 56 miles (90 km) N of Sacramento	38,000 ft^{3}/s 65,000 m^{3}/min	Releases from Sacramento River to Sutter Bypass
Fremont Weir	8 miles (13 km) NE of Woodland; 15 miles (24 km) NW of Sacramento	343,000 ft^{3}/s 583,000 m^{3}/min	Releases from Sacramento River
Sacramento Weir & Bypass	West Sacramento; 4 miles (6.4 km) N of Tower Bridge	112,000 ft^{3}/s 190,000 m^{3}/min	Only manual weir in the Yolo Bypass system
Cache Creek Settling Basin & Weir	2 miles (3.2 km) E of Woodland	30,000 ft^{3}/s 51,000 m^{3}/min	Covers 3,600 acres (1,500 ha)

Water flowing through the Yolo Bypass is drained through a riparian channel along its southeastern edge, named the Toe Drain. In the Liberty Farms area, the bypass joins first Prospect Slough and then Cache Slough adjacent to the connection of the Sacramento Deep Water Ship Channel. Cache Slough then reconnects with the Sacramento River just north of Rio Vista. The water eventually flows into the Sacramento-San Joaquin Delta, just above Rio Vista, and from there into San Francisco Bay.

The Yolo Bypass can hold approximately four times the flow of the Sacramento River. Together, the Sacramento River and Yolo Bypass are designed to handle a maximum flow of 600,000 cubic feet per second (1,000,000 m^{3}/min), of which the Sacramento handles 110,000 ft^{3}/s (190,000 m^{3}/min) and the bypass 500,000 ft^{3}/s (850,000 m^{3}/min). This flood management relieves pressure on the surrounding river levee systems and reduces the risk of urban flooding in nearby cities, such as Sacramento or Davis. During wet years, which occur during more than half of all rainy seasons, the Yolo Bypass is flooded; when flooded, it covers an area equal to 1/3 the area of San Francisco and San Pablo Bays, to a depth ranging from 6 to 10 feet (1.8 to 3.0 m).

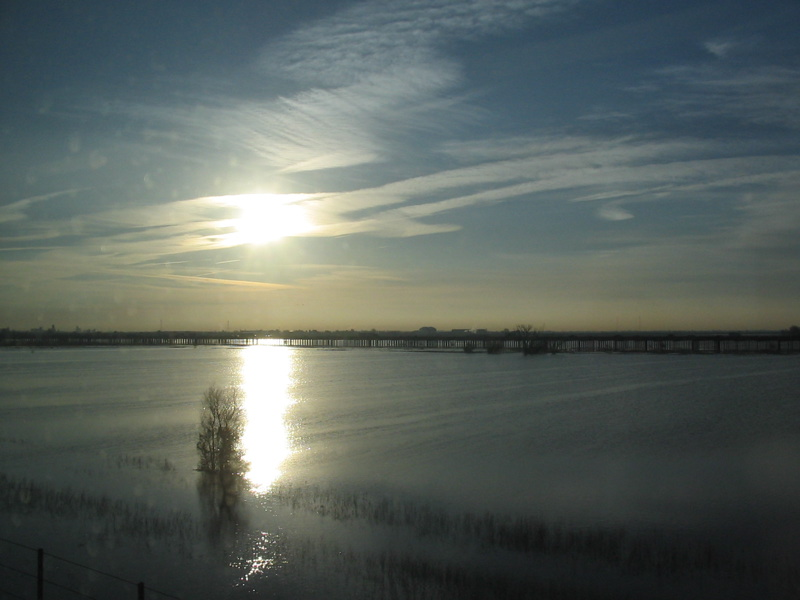
Flooded Yolo Bypass, February 2006. Interstate 80 runs along the causeway in the distance.

The state of California has the right to inundate any land in the Yolo Bypass with floodwater. These rights also limit landowners from growing vegetation or building structures that would significantly obstruct flow. There is no compensation for farmers who may lose crops or other losses due to flooding. The state manages the flooding of the Yolo Bypass with farmers and native species in mind. Using adaptive management, there is a balance between providing efficient flood protection, agriculture, and habitat benefits in the Yolo Bypass year-round.

=== Wildlife habitats ===
The Yolo Bypass contains the Fremont Weir Wildlife Area, Sacramento Weir Wildlife Area and Yolo Bypass Wildlife Area. The Vic Fazio Yolo Wildlife Area is also part of the Yolo Bypass Wildlife Area and was the largest public/private restoration project west of the Florida Everglades. The entire bypass forms a valuable wetland habitat when flooded during the winter and spring rainy season. In the summer, areas of the bypass outside the wildlife areas are used for agriculture.

The Yolo Bypass provides habitat for over 280 terrestrial vertebrate species, changing throughout the seasons. The natural flooding provides an exceptionally good nursery habitat for native fish species, including the endangered Chinook salmon. Juvenile salmon have been found to grow substantially better in the Yolo Bypass than the adjacent Sacramento River. Other special-status wildlife residing in the Yolo Bypass includes giant garter snake, fairy shrimp, bald eagle, Swainson's Hawk, and more. Wildlife managers occasionally flood certain areas to create wetlands for migratory waterfowl. The Yolo Bypass is somewhat of a pit stop for the waterfowl, and it provides nesting habitat and food for this abundance of birds. The Yolo Basin Wetlands Project is accounted as being one of the largest wetland restoration projects in the Western United States. Habitats in the Yolo Basin Wetlands includes seasonal wetlands, uplands, perennial wetlands, vernal pools and riparian forest. The Bypass also holds species of riparian vegetation such as cottonwoods, black walnut, willows, saltgrass, and other assorted tree and grass species. The Yolo Causeway has one of the largest colonies of bats in the state. Thousands of bats, consisting of Mexican free-tailed bats and two other species, roost under the Interstate 80 structure that crosses over the wildlife area.

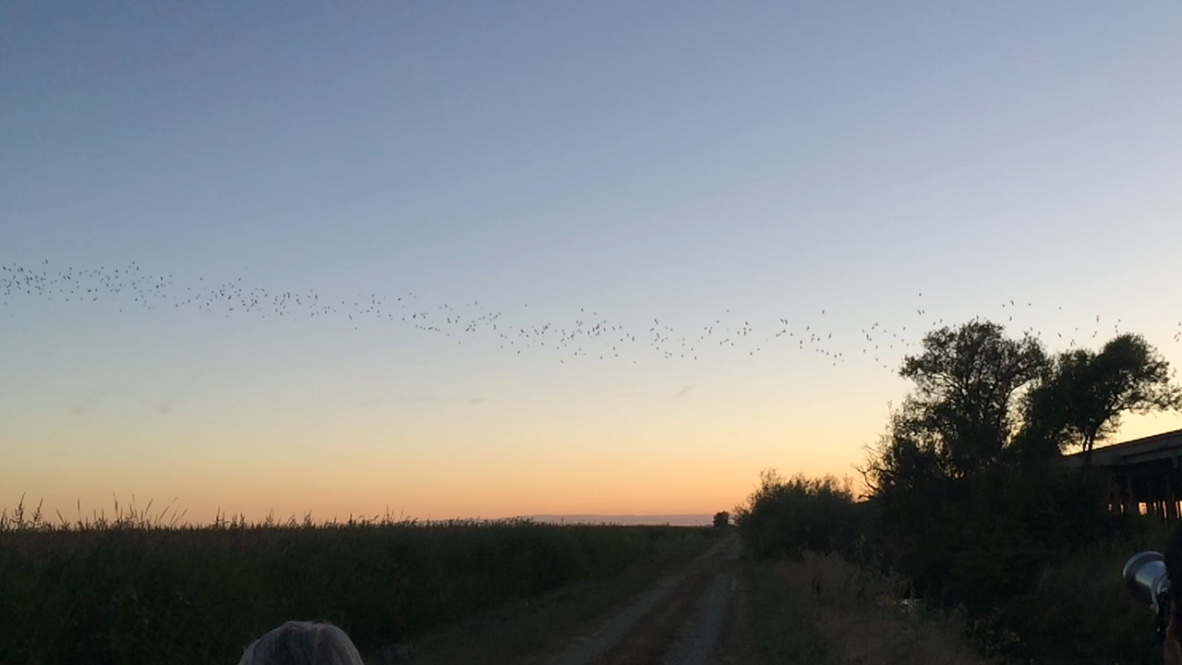
Approximately 250,000 Mexican free-tailed bats migrate to and nest under the Yolo Causeway during the summer (2018)

Habitat Management activities are monitored annually by the California Department of Fish and Wildlife's Wildlife Area Habitat Committee for area in the Yolo Bypass Wildlife Area. Each year they establish a specific management plan for different parts of the land. The targeted species for seasonal wetland management is the timothy species. This plant provides countless nutritional seeds for consumption by assorted migratory waterfowl. There are also quite a few nonnative species that are not necessarily wanted in the bypass such as dock and perennial pepperweed.

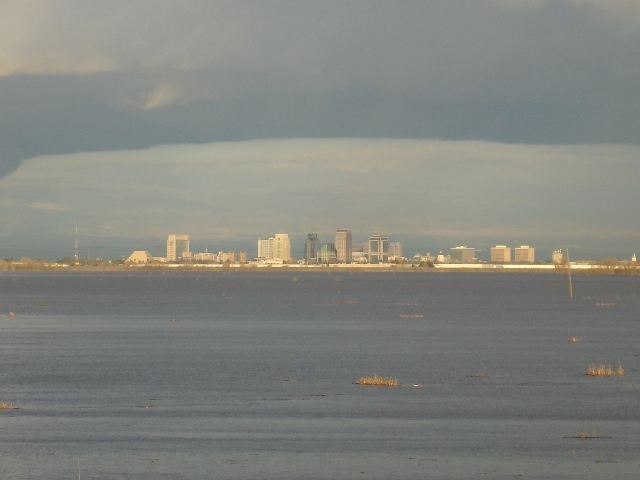
The Yolo Bypass in March 2006, looking east from Davis toward Sacramento. Heavy rainstorms in January led to total flooding in the bypass.

Years with high flows in the Yolo Bypass also benefit fish populations in the San Francisco Estuary. This is mainly because of increased habitat availability, food supply, larval transport, and reduced predation.

=== Agriculture ===
The floodplains of the Yolo Bypass are a surprisingly good farming ground for multiple seasonal crops. The California Department of Fish and Wildlife leases land to farmers through the Dixon Resource Conservation District. The most widely-grown crops include rice, safflower, processing tomatoes, corn, sunflower, and irrigated pasture. Half of the rice grown in the Yolo Bypass is wild due to its tolerance to colder weather. Farming is mainly done in late spring and summer when flooding does not usually occur, but farming can be halted or delayed depending on the water level in the Bypass.

Agricultural crops in Yolo County amount to about $300 million a year. Leftover crop residue is beneficial to animal habitat. The already-harvested land creates foraging area, and food opportunities, such as seeds for mourning dove and the non-native ring-necked pheasants.

=== Recreation and education ===
The Yolo Bypass provides a multitude of recreational uses and educational as well. The Yolo Bypass Wildlife Headquarters provides summer educational programs for children in kindergarten through high school. These programs include hands on activities on plants, animals, and wetlands, using the Yolo Bypass Wildlife Area as a classroom. They have summer camps, classes, and are open to schools wanting to coordinate field trips as well. The Bypass is also open for guided tours for all ages of the public every month.

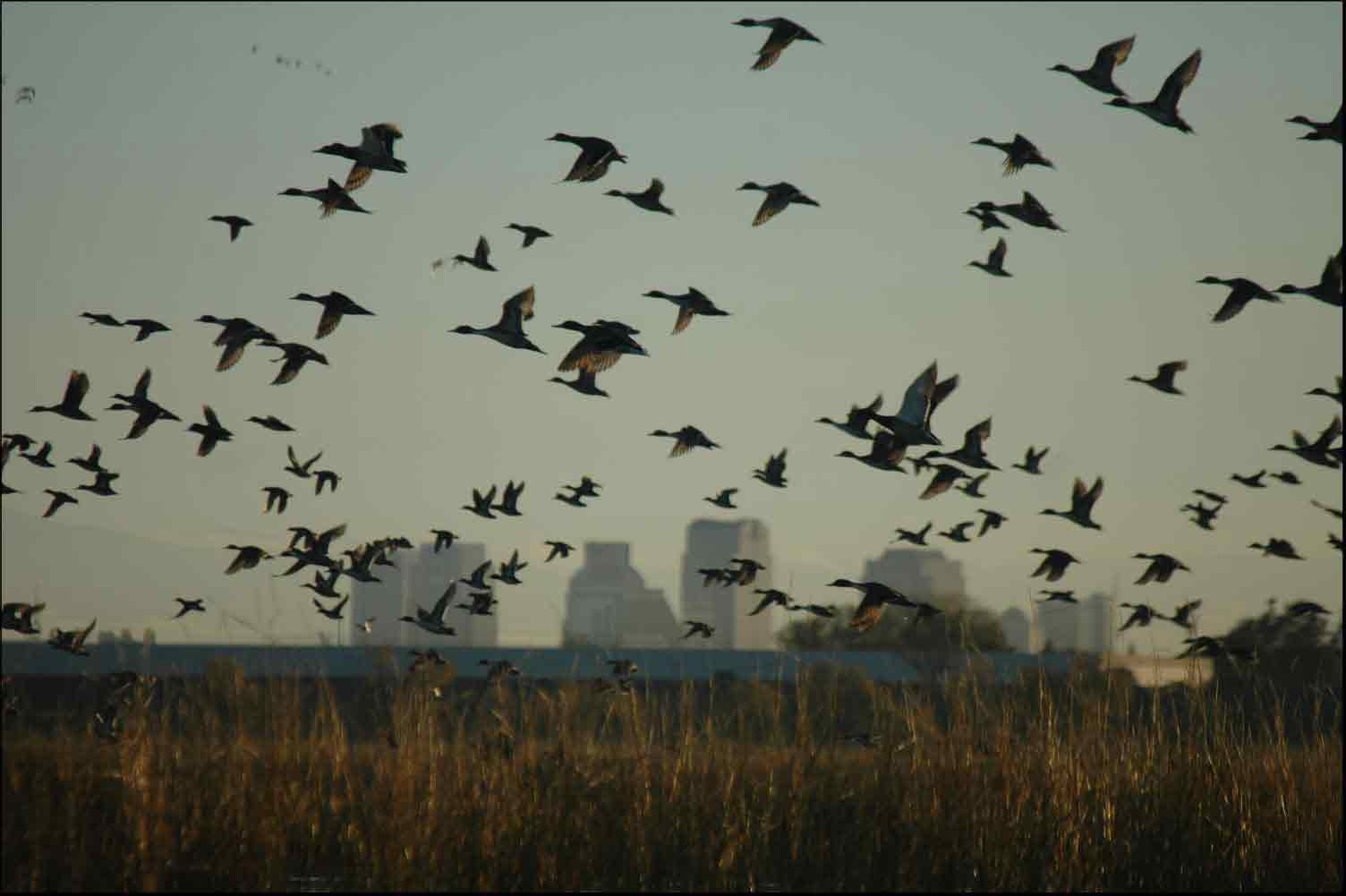
Ducks take flight at Yolo Bypass Wildlife Area (2007)

The Yolo Bypass is often used for bird watching, hunting, and hiking. Game species include waterfowl (when the bypass is flooded), ring-necked pheasant, and mourning dove. There are also assorted trails that loop around the wetlands in the Yolo Bypass that may be accessed by the public.

== Future ==
Recent modeling shows that increasing flow to the Yolo Bypass may be beneficial for animal habitat. An upcoming project looks to extend the Yolo Bypass by potentially pushing back the levees, and allowing more room for water to be released into the Yolo Bypass. Separately, the Bay Delta Conservation Plan includes plans to help restore fish habitat in the Yolo Bypass. Its plan is to put a notch at the top the Fremont Weir to allow for more water to flow, increasing the frequency of flooding for fish habitat.

=== The Nigiri Project ===
The Nigiri Project is a collaborative research study being done in the Yolo Bypass at Knaggs Ranch by the UC Davis Center for Watershed Sciences, the California Department of Water Resources, and the nonprofit organization California Trout.

This research is being conducted to determine how floodplains, particularly flooded rice fields, can provide habitat to endangered species such as the Chinook Salmon. In the summer these fields are used for the production of rice, while in the winter, the land can be flooded to create ideal wetland habitat for salmon. They have been experimenting for the past four consecutive winters, and have documented the fastest growth of juvenile Chinook Salmon ever recorded in the Central Valley. The experiment aims to mimic the natural annual flood cycle of the Sacramento River, which most native fish species relied upon.

This project is currently funded by the U.S. Bureau of Reclamation, California Trout, and the California Department of Water Resources.
