= 1951 Colorado Mines Orediggers football team =

American college football season

1951 Colorado Mines Orediggers football

RMC champion
- Conference: Rocky Mountain Conference
- Record: 7–2 (4–0 RMC)
- Head coach: Fritz S. Brennecke (5th season)

1951 Rocky Mountain Conference football standings
	Conf.					Overall
Team	W		L		T	W		L		T
Colorado Mines $	4	–	0	–	0	7	–	2	–	0
Colorado College	3	–	2	–	0	4	–	5	–	0
Idaho State	3	–	2	–	0	5	–	4	–	0
Colorado State–Greeley	2	–	3	–	0	4	–	3	–	0
Western State (CO)	2	–	3	–	0	3	–	5	–	0
Montana State	0	–	4	–	0	0	–	7	–	0
$ – Conference champion

The 1951 Colorado Mines Orediggers football team was an American football team that represented the Colorado School of Mines in the Rocky Mountain Conference (RMC) during the 1951 college football season. In their fifth year under head coach Fritz S. Brennecke, the team compiled a 7–2 record (4–0 against conference opponents), outscored opponents by a total of 123 to 119, and won the RMC championship. It was the school's first conference title since 1939.

Four Colorado Mines players were selected to the first team on the All-Rocky Mountain Conference team selected by the Associated Press: end Tom Wyman (offensive unit) tackle Darrell Beckley (offensive unit); halfback Ron Bethurum (offensive unit); and tackle Bill Cooke (defensive unit). Other Mines players receiving votes included end John Volosi, guard Wally Arnold, center Adam Thomas, and back Ed Ziokowski.

== Schedule ==
Date	Opponent	Site	Result	Attendance	Source
September 14	Chadron State*	Golden, CO	W 19–0		
September 22	at Idaho State	Pocatello, ID	W 14–12		
September 29	at Colorado A&M*	Colorado Field; Fort Collins, CO	L 0–41		
October 5	Western State	Golden, CO	W 27–26		
October 12	New Mexico A&M*	Golden, CO	W 7–0		
October 27	Colorado State–Greeley	Golden, CO	W 14–13		
November 3	at Eastern New Mexico*	Portales, NM	L 0–7	5,000	
November 10	Adams State*	Golden, CO	W 28–14		
November 17	at Colorado College	Colorado Springs, CO	W 14–6		
*Non-conference game
