= 1951 Utah State Aggies football team =

American college football season

1951 Utah State Aggies football
- Conference: Skyline Conference
- Record: 3–5–1 (2–4–1 Skyline)
- Head coach: John Roning (1st season)
- Home stadium: Romney Stadium

1951 Skyline Conference football standings
	Conf.					Overall
Team	W		L		T	W		L		T
Utah $	4	–	1	–	0	7	–	4	–	0
Wyoming	5	–	1	–	1	7	–	2	–	1
Denver	4	–	3	–	0	6	–	4	–	0
Colorado A&M	3	–	3	–	1	5	–	4	–	1
BYU	2	–	3	–	1	6	–	3	–	1
Utah State	2	–	4	–	1	3	–	5	–	1
New Mexico	2	–	4	–	0	4	–	7	–	0
Montana	1	–	4	–	0	2	–	7	–	0
$ – Conference champion

The 1951 Utah State Aggies football team was an American football team that represented Utah State University in the Skyline Conference during the 1951 college football season. In their first season under head coach John Roning, the Aggies compiled a 3–5–1 record (2–4–1 against Skyline opponents), finished sixth in the Skyline Conference, and were outscored by opponents by a total of 183 to 161.

== Schedule ==
Date	Opponent	Site	Result	Attendance	Source
September 22	Arizona State*	Romney Stadium; Logan, UT	L 27–33	5,800	
September 28	Wichita*	Romney Stadium; Logan, UT	W 21–7		
October 6	at Wyoming	War Memorial Stadium; Laramie, WY (rivalry)	L 0–37	7,400	
October 20	at Colorado A&M	Colorado Field; Fort Collins, CO	T 20–20		
October 27	Montana	Romney Stadium; Logan, UT	W 19–6	6,000	
November 3	Utah^{†}	Romney Stadium; Logan, UT (rivalry)	L 20–28	11,000	
November 10	at BYU	Cougar Stadium; Provo, UT (rivalry)	L 27–28	8,000	
November 17	at Denver	Hilltop Stadium; Denver, CO	W 14–7		
December 1	at New Mexico	Zimmerman Field; Albuquerque, NM	L 13–17		
*Non-conference game; ^{†}Homecoming
