= 1951 Wyoming Cowboys football team =

American college football season

1951 Wyoming Cowboys football
- Conference: Skyline Conference
- Record: 7–2–1 (5–1–1 Skyline)
- Head coach: Bowden Wyatt (5th season)
- Captain: James Martin
- Home stadium: War Memorial Stadium

1951 Skyline Conference football standings
	Conf.					Overall
Team	W		L		T	W		L		T
Utah $	4	–	1	–	0	7	–	4	–	0
Wyoming	5	–	1	–	1	7	–	2	–	1
Denver	4	–	3	–	0	6	–	4	–	0
Colorado A&M	3	–	3	–	1	5	–	4	–	1
BYU	2	–	3	–	1	6	–	3	–	1
Utah State	2	–	4	–	1	3	–	5	–	1
New Mexico	2	–	4	–	0	4	–	7	–	0
Montana	1	–	4	–	0	2	–	7	–	0
$ – Conference champion

The 1951 Wyoming Cowboys football team was an American football team that represented the University of Wyoming as a member of the Skyline Conference during the 1951 college football season. In their fifth season under head coach Bowden Wyatt, the Cowboys compiled a 7–2–1 record (5–1–1 against Skyline opponents), finished second in the conference, and outscored opponents by a total of 220 to 82. The team was ranked at No. 62 in the 1951 Litkenhous Ratings.

== Schedule ==
Date	Opponent	Site	Result	Attendance	Source
September 15	at Florida*	Gator Bowl Stadium; Jacksonville, FL	L 0–13	22,000–25,000	
September 22	Idaho*	War Memorial Stadium; Laramie, WY	W 28–0	12,401	
September 29	Denver	War Memorial Stadium; Laramie, WY	W 20–14	14,020	
October 6	Utah State	War Memorial Stadium; Laramie, WY (rivalry)	W 37–0	7,400	
October 13	at Colorado A&M	Colorado Field; Fort Collins, CO (rivalry)	L 7–14		
October 20	BYU^{†}	War Memorial Stadium; Laramie, WY	T 20–20	7,858	
October 27	at Utah	Ute Stadium; Salt Lake City, UT	W 13–0	15,738	
November 3	at Montana	Dornblaser Field; Missoula, MT	W 34–7		
November 10	at New Mexico	Zimmerman Field; Albuquerque, NM	W 41–7		
November 24	at Arizona State*	Goodwin Stadium; Tempe, AZ	W 20–7		
*Non-conference game; ^{†}Homecoming
