= 1956 Utah Utes football team =

American college football season

1956 Utah Utes football
- Conference: Skyline Conference
- Record: 5–5 (5–1 Skyline)
- Head coach: Jack Curtice (7th season)
- Home stadium: Ute Stadium

1956 Skyline Conference football standings
| | Conf. | | | | | Overall |
| Team | W | | L | | T | W | | L | | T |
|---|---|---|---|---|---|---|---|---|---|---|
| Wyoming | 7 | – | 0 | – | 0 | 10 | – | 0 | – | 0 |
| Utah | 5 | – | 1 | – | 0 | 5 | – | 5 | – | 0 |
| Denver | 4 | – | 3 | – | 0 | 6 | – | 4 | – | 0 |
| Utah State | 4 | – | 3 | – | 0 | 6 | – | 4 | – | 0 |
| Colorado A&M | 2 | – | 4 | – | 1 | 2 | – | 7 | – | 1 |
| New Mexico | 2 | – | 4 | – | 0 | 4 | – | 6 | – | 0 |
| BYU | 1 | – | 5 | – | 1 | 2 | – | 7 | – | 1 |
| Montana | 1 | – | 6 | – | 0 | 1 | – | 9 | – | 0 |
$ – Conference champion

The 1956 Utah Utes football team, or also commonly known as the Utah Redskins, was an American football team that represented the University of Utah as a member of the Skyline Conference during the 1956 college football season. In their seventh season under head coach Jack Curtice, the Utes compiled an overall record of 5–5 and a conference record of 5-1, placing second in the Skyline Conference.

== Schedule ==
| Date | Opponent | Site | Result | Attendance | Source |
|---|---|---|---|---|---|
| September 21 | at No. 17 UCLA* | Los Angeles Memorial Coliseum; Los Angeles, CA | L 7–13 | 37,038 | |
| September 29 | Montana | Ute Stadium; Salt Lake City, UT | W 26–6 | 18,587 | |
| October 5 | at BYU | Cougar Stadium; Provo, UT (rivalry) | W 41–6 | 15,055 | |
| October 13 | Denver | Ute Stadium; Salt Lake City, UT | W 27–13 | 17,849 | |
| October 20 | at Wyoming | War Memorial Stadium; Laramie, WY | L 20–30 | 16,833 | |
| October 27 | Idaho*^{†} | Ute Stadium; Salt Lake City, UT | L 21–27 | 11,520 | |
| November 3 | at Rice* | Rice Stadium; Houston, TX | L 0–27 | 22,000 | |
| November 10 | at Colorado A&M | Colorado Field; Fort Collins, CO | W 49–27 | 3,953 | |
| November 17 | Colorado* | Ute Stadium; Salt Lake City, UT (rivalry) | L 7–21 | 9,773 | |
| November 22 | Utah State | Ute Stadium; Salt Lake City, UT (rivalry) | W 29–7 | 18,169 | |
*Non-conference game; ^{†}Homecoming; Rankings from AP Poll released prior to the game
