= 1954 Colorado A&M Aggies football team =

American college football season

1954 Colorado A&M Aggies football
- Conference: Skyline Conference
- Record: 3–7 (3–4 Skyline)
- Head coach: Bob Davis (8th season)
- Home stadium: Colorado Field

1954 Skyline Conference football standings
	Conf.					Overall
Team	W		L		T	W		L		T
Denver $	6	–	1	–	0	9	–	1	–	0
Wyoming	5	–	1	–	0	6	–	4	–	0
Utah State	4	–	3	–	0	4	–	6	–	0
New Mexico	3	–	3	–	0	5	–	5	–	0
Utah	3	–	3	–	0	4	–	7	–	0
Colorado A&M	3	–	4	–	0	3	–	7	–	0
Montana	1	–	5	–	0	3	–	6	–	0
BYU	1	–	6	–	0	1	–	8	–	0
$ – Conference champion

The 1954 Colorado A&M Aggies football team represented Colorado State College of Agriculture and Mechanic Arts in the Skyline Conference during the 1954 college football season. In their eighth season under head coach Bob Davis, the Aggies compiled a 3–7 record (3–4 against Skyline opponents), finished sixth in the Skyline Conference, and were outscored by opponents by a total of 248 to 93.

== Schedule ==
Date	Opponent	Site	Result	Attendance	Source
September 18	at Kansas State*	Memorial Stadium; Manhattan, KS	L 0–29	10,500–12,000	
September 25	at Colorado*	Folsom Field; Boulder, CO (rivalry)	L 0–46	26,500	
October 2	BYU	Colorado Field; Fort Collins, CO	W 14–13	5,000	
October 9	Wyoming	Colorado Field; Fort Collins, CO (rivalry)	L 0–34	9,500	
October 16	Pacific (CA)*^{†}	Colorado Field; Fort Collins, CO	L 7–15	5,558	
October 23	at Utah State	Romney Stadium; Logan, UT	L 14–20		
October 30	Montana	Colorado Field; Fort Collins, CO	W 37–34	2,477	
November 6	Utah	Colorado Field; Fort Collins, CO	W 14–13	2,903	
November 13	at New Mexico	Zimmerman Field; Albuquerque, NM	L 7–10	7,500	
November 25	at Denver	DU Stadium; Denver, CO	L 0–34	23,902	
*Non-conference game; ^{†}Homecoming
