= 1951 Colorado A&M Aggies football team =

American college football season

1951 Colorado A&M Aggies football
- Conference: Skyline Conference
- Record: 5–4–1 (3–3–1 Skyline)
- Head coach: Bob Davis (5th season)
- Home stadium: Colorado Field

1951 Skyline Conference football standings
	Conf.					Overall
Team	W		L		T	W		L		T
Utah $	4	–	1	–	0	7	–	4	–	0
Wyoming	5	–	1	–	1	7	–	2	–	1
Denver	4	–	3	–	0	6	–	4	–	0
Colorado A&M	3	–	3	–	1	5	–	4	–	1
BYU	2	–	3	–	1	6	–	3	–	1
Utah State	2	–	4	–	1	3	–	5	–	1
New Mexico	2	–	4	–	0	4	–	7	–	0
Montana	1	–	4	–	0	2	–	7	–	0
$ – Conference champion

The 1951 Colorado A&M Aggies football team represented Colorado State College of Agriculture and Mechanic Arts in the Skyline Conference during the 1951 college football season. In their fifth season under head coach Bob Davis, the Aggies compiled a 5–4–1 record (3–3–1 against Skyline opponents), finished fourth in the Skyline Conference, and outscored all opponents by a total of 242 to 158.

== Schedule ==
Date	Opponent	Site	Result	Attendance	Source
September 22	at Colorado*	Folsom Field; Boulder, CO (rivalry)	L 13–28	18,913	
September 29	Colorado Mines*	Colorado Field; Fort Collins, CO	W 41–0		
October 6	at Colorado College*	Washburn Field; Colorado Springs, CO	W 54–13		
October 13	Wyoming	Colorado Field; Fort Collins, CO (Border War)	W 14–7		
October 20	Utah State^{†}	Colorado Field; Fort Collins, CO	T 20–20		
October 27	at New Mexico	Zimmerman Field; Albuquerque, NM	W 20–15	7,500	
November 3	at BYU	Cougar Stadium; Provo, UT	L 19–21	8,500	
November 10	Montana	Colorado Field; Fort Collins, CO	W 34–6	5,800	
November 17	at Utah	Ute Stadium; Salt Lake City, UT	L 21–27	9,038	
November 24	at Denver	Hilltop Stadium; Denver, CO	L 6–21		
*Non-conference game; ^{†}Homecoming
