= 1957 Utah State Aggies football team =

American college football season

1957 Utah State Aggies football
- Conference: Skyline Conference
- Record: 2–7–1 (1–5–1 Skyline)
- Head coach: Ev Faunce (3rd season)
- Home stadium: Romney Stadium

1957 Skyline Conference football standings
	Conf.					Overall
Team	W		L		T	W		L		T
Utah $	5	–	1	–	0	6	–	4	–	0
BYU	5	–	1	–	1	5	–	3	–	2
Denver	5	–	2	–	0	6	–	4	–	0
Wyoming	3	–	2	–	2	4	–	3	–	3
New Mexico	2	–	4	–	0	4	–	6	–	0
Colorado State	2	–	5	–	0	3	–	7	–	0
Montana	2	–	5	–	0	2	–	7	–	0
Utah State	1	–	5	–	1	2	–	7	–	1
$ – Conference champion

The 1957 Utah State Aggies football team was an American football team that represented Utah State University in the Skyline Conference during the 1957 college football season. In their third season under head coach Ev Faunce, the Aggies compiled a 2–7–1 record (1–5–1 against Skyline opponents), finished last in the Skyline Conference, and were outscored by opponents by a total of 255 to 153.

== Schedule ==
Date	Opponent	Site	Result	Attendance	Source
September 14	Hawaii*	Romney Stadium; Logan, UT	W 26–12	3,800–5,000	
September 28	at Iowa*	Iowa Stadium; Iowa City, IA	L 14–70	40,125	
October 5	at Wyoming	War Memorial Stadium; Laramie, WY (rivalry)	T 19–19	7,300	
October 12	New Mexico	Romney Stadium; Logan, UT	L 10–14	5,000	
October 19	Montana	Romney Stadium; Logan, UT	L 25–35	7,100	
October 26	at Colorado State	Colorado Field; Fort Collins, CO	W 27–14	9,000	
November 2	at BYU	Cougar Stadium; Provo, UT (rivalry)	L 0–14	7,244	
November 9	Idaho*	Romney Stadium; Logan, UT	L 7–35	4,000	
November 16	at Denver	DU Stadium; Denver, CO	L 19–21	3,680–4,400	
November 28	at Utah	Ute Stadium; Salt Lake City, UT (rivalry)	L 6–21	17,300	
*Non-conference game
