= 1956 Montana Grizzlies football team =

American college football season

1956 Montana Grizzlies football
- Conference: Skyline Conference
- Record: 1–9 (1–6 Skyline)
- Head coach: Jerry Williams (2nd season)
- Home stadium: Dornblaser Field

1956 Skyline Conference football standings
	Conf.					Overall
Team	W		L		T	W		L		T
Wyoming	7	–	0	–	0	10	–	0	–	0
Utah	5	–	1	–	0	5	–	5	–	0
Denver	4	–	3	–	0	6	–	4	–	0
Utah State	4	–	3	–	0	6	–	4	–	0
Colorado A&M	2	–	4	–	1	2	–	7	–	1
New Mexico	2	–	4	–	0	4	–	6	–	0
BYU	1	–	5	–	1	2	–	7	–	1
Montana	1	–	6	–	0	1	–	9	–	0
$ – Conference champion

The 1956 Montana Grizzlies football team represented the University of Montana in the 1956 college football season as a member of the Skyline Conference. The Grizzlies were led by second-year head coach Jerry Williams, played their home games at Dornblaser Field and finished the season with a record of one win and nine losses (1–9, 1–6 Skyline).

== Schedule ==
Date	Opponent	Site	Result	Attendance	Source
September 15	at Arizona*	Montgomery Stadium; Phoenix, AZ	L 12–27	12,000	
September 29	at Utah	Ute Stadium; Salt Lake City, UT	L 6–26	18,587	
October 5	at Denver	DU Stadium; Denver, CO	L 13–22	11,560–11,561	
October 13	Utah State^{†}	Dornblaser Field; Missoula, MT	L 13–27	7,500	
October 20	BYU	Dornblaser Field; Missoula, MT	W 21–14	6,000	
October 27	at Colorado A&M	Colorado Field; Fort Collins, CO	L 20–34	7,498	
November 3	Montana State*	Dornblaser Field; Missoula, MT (rivalry)	L 14–33	7,500	
November 10	vs. Wyoming	Daylis Stadium; Billings, MT (Midland Roundtable Grid Classic)	L 13–34	8,000	
November 17	at New Mexico	Zimmerman Field; Albuquerque, NM	L 13–14		
November 22	Idaho*	Dornblaser Field; Missoula, MT (Little Brown Stein)	L 0–14	3,000	
*Non-conference game; ^{†}Homecoming

== After the season ==
The following Grizzly was selected in the 1957 NFL draft after the season.

Round	Pick	Player	Position	NFL club
16	190	Terry Hurley	End	Chicago Cardinals
