= 1954 Utah Utes football team =

American college football season

1954 Utah Utes football
- Conference: Skyline Conference
- Record: 4–7 (3–3 Skyline)
- Head coach: Jack Curtice (5th season)
- Home stadium: Ute Stadium

1954 Skyline Conference football standings
	Conf.					Overall
Team	W		L		T	W		L		T
Denver $	6	–	1	–	0	9	–	1	–	0
Wyoming	5	–	1	–	0	6	–	4	–	0
Utah State	4	–	3	–	0	4	–	6	–	0
New Mexico	3	–	3	–	0	5	–	5	–	0
Utah	3	–	3	–	0	4	–	7	–	0
Colorado A&M	3	–	4	–	0	3	–	7	–	0
Montana	1	–	5	–	0	3	–	6	–	0
BYU	1	–	6	–	0	1	–	8	–	0
$ – Conference champion

The 1954 Utah Utes football team, or also commonly known as the Utah Redskins, was an American football team that represented the University of Utah as a member of the Skyline Conference during the 1954 college football season. In their fifth season under head coach Jack Curtice, the Utes compiled an overall record of 4–7 with a mark of 3–3 against conference opponents, tying for fourth place in the Skyline.

== Schedule ==
Date	Opponent	Site	Result	Attendance	Source
September 18	at Washington*	Husky Stadium; Seattle, WA	L 6–7	25,754	
September 25	Arizona*	Ute Stadium; Salt Lake City, UT	L 20–54	12,479	
October 2	at Oregon*	Hayward Field; Eugene, OR	W 7–6	11,000	
October 9	at BYU	Cougar Stadium; Provo, UT (rivalry)	W 12–7	13,702	
October 16	Denver	Ute Stadium; Salt Lake City, UT	L 20–28	18,137–18,179	
October 23	at Wyoming	War Memorial Stadium; Laramie, WY	W 14–7	14,734	
October 30	Idaho*^{†}	Ute Stadium; Salt Lake City, UT	L 13–14	14,065	
November 6	at Colorado A&M	Colorado Field; Fort Collins, CO	L 13–14	2,903	
November 13	Colorado*	Ute Stadium; Salt Lake City, UT (rivalry)	L 7–20	10,111	
November 20	at Montana	Dornblaser Field; Missoula, MT	W 41–20	5,500	
November 25	Utah State	Ute Stadium; Salt Lake City, UT (rivalry)	L 19–35	17,347	
*Non-conference game; ^{†}Homecoming

== NFL draft ==
Utah had two players selected in the 1955 NFL draft.

Player	Position	Round	Pick	NFL team
Don Henderson	Tackle	13	156	Detroit Lions
Max Pierce	Back	24	278	Chicago Cardinals
