= 1951 Arizona Wildcats football team =

American college football season

1951 Arizona Wildcats football
- Conference: Border Conference
- Record: 6–5 (3–3 Border)
- Head coach: Bob Winslow (3rd season)
- Captains: Jim Donarski; Bill Glazier
- Home stadium: Arizona Stadium

1951 Border Conference football standings
	Conf.					Overall
Team	W		L		T	W		L		T
Texas Tech $	4	–	0	–	0	7	–	4	–	0
Arizona State	4	–	1	–	0	6	–	3	–	1
Hardin–Simmons	4	–	1	–	0	6	–	6	–	0
Arizona	3	–	3	–	0	6	–	5	–	0
Texas Western	2	–	4	–	0	3	–	7	–	0
New Mexico A&M	1	–	4	–	0	1	–	9	–	0
West Texas State	1	–	5	–	0	2	–	7	–	0
Arizona State–Flagstaff	0	–	1	–	0	1	–	7	–	0
$ – Conference champion

The 1951 Arizona Wildcats football team represented the University of Arizona in the Border Conference during the 1951 college football season. In their third and final season under head coach Bob Winslow, the Wildcats compiled a 6–5 record (3–3 against Border opponents) and were outscored by their opponents, 270 to 246. The team captains were Jim Donarski and Bill Glazier. The team played its home games in Arizona Stadium in Tucson, Arizona.

== Schedule ==
Date	Time	Opponent	Site	Result	Attendance	Source
September 15		New Mexico A&M	Arizona Stadium; Tucson, AZ	W 67–13	16,000	
September 22		Utah*	Arizona Stadium; Tucson, AZ	L 7–27	21,500	
September 29		at Oregon*	Hayward Field; Eugene, OR	L 21–39		
October 6	8:00 p.m.	West Texas State	Arizona Stadium; Tucson, AZ	W 28–13	17,500	
October 13		Texas Western	Arizona Stadium; Tucson, AZ	W 19–15		
October 27		at Texas Tech	Jones Stadium; Lubbock, TX	L 0–41	16,000	
November 3		New Mexico*	Arizona Stadium; Tucson, AZ	W 32–20	15,000	
November 10		at Arizona State	Goodwin Stadium; Tempe, AZ (rivalry)	L 14–61		
November 17		Idaho*	Arizona Stadium; Tucson, AZ	W 13–6	16,000	
November 24		at Hardin–Simmons	Parramore Stadium; Abilene, TX	L 13–14	3,000	
December 21		at Hawaii*	Honolulu Stadium; Honolulu, Territory of Hawaii	W 32–21	7,500	
*Non-conference game; All times are in Central time
