= 1956 Wyoming Cowboys football team =

American college football season

1956 Wyoming Cowboys football

Skyline champion
- Conference: Skyline Conference

Ranking
- Coaches: No. 16
- Record: 10–0 (7–0 Skyline)
- Head coach: Phil Dickens (4th season)
- Captain: Ove Stapleton
- Home stadium: War Memorial Stadium

1956 Skyline Conference football standings
	Conf.					Overall
Team	W		L		T	W		L		T
Wyoming	7	–	0	–	0	10	–	0	–	0
Utah	5	–	1	–	0	5	–	5	–	0
Denver	4	–	3	–	0	6	–	4	–	0
Utah State	4	–	3	–	0	6	–	4	–	0
Colorado A&M	2	–	4	–	1	2	–	7	–	1
New Mexico	2	–	4	–	0	4	–	6	–	0
BYU	1	–	5	–	1	2	–	7	–	1
Montana	1	–	6	–	0	1	–	9	–	0
$ – Conference champion

The 1956 Wyoming Cowboys football team was an American football team that represented the University of Wyoming as a member of the Skyline Conference during the 1956 college football season. In their fourth season under head coach Phil Dickens, the Cowboys compiled a perfect 10–0 record (7–0 against Skyline opponents), won the Skyline Conference championship, and outscored opponents by a total of 252 to 112. The Cowboys were ranked No. 19 in the AP poll issued on November 19, 1956, but dropped out in the final poll.

The team's statistical leaders included Larry Zowada with 878 passing yards, Jim Crawford with 1,104 rushing yards and 72 points scored, and John Watts with 287 receiving yards. Crawford led the nation in rushing yards and went on to play five seasons for the Boston Patriots.

Believing that they would get a better bowl appearance, the team declined a Sun Bowl invitation. No other invitations came.

== Schedule ==
Date	Opponent	Site	Result	Attendance	Source
September 15	Western State (CO)*	War Memorial Stadium; Laramie, WY	W 40–13	6,618	
September 22	at Arizona*	Arizona Stadium; Tucson, AZ	W 26–20	23,000	
September 29	Denver	War Memorial Stadium; Laramie, WY	W 27–0	16,869	
October 6	at Colorado A&M	Colorado Field; Fort Collins, CO (rivalry)	W 20–12	11,138	
October 13	New Mexico	War Memorial Stadium; Laramie, WY	W 20–13	6,021	
October 20	Utah	War Memorial Stadium; Laramie, WY	W 30–20	16,833	
October 27	Kansas State*	War Memorial Stadium; Laramie, WY	W 27–15	6,731	
November 3	at Utah State	Romney Stadium; Logan, UT (rivalry)	W 21–0	9,000	
November 10	vs. Montana	Daylis Stadium; Billings, MT (Midland Roundtable Grid Classic)	W 34–13	8,000	
November 17	at BYU	Cougar Stadium; Provo, UT	W 7–6	4,447	
*Non-conference game
