= 1959 Colorado State Rams football team =

American college football season

1959 Colorado State Rams football
- Conference: Skyline Conference
- Record: 6–4 (5–2 Skyline)
- Head coach: Don Mullison (4th season)
- Home stadium: Colorado Field

1959 Skyline Conference football standings
	Conf.					Overall
Team	W		L		T	W		L		T
No. 16 Wyoming $	7	–	0	–	0	9	–	1	–	0
Colorado State	5	–	2	–	0	6	–	4	–	0
New Mexico	4	–	2	–	0	7	–	3	–	0
Utah	3	–	2	–	0	5	–	5	–	0
Utah State	2	–	5	–	0	5	–	6	–	0
BYU	2	–	5	–	0	3	–	7	–	0
Denver	2	–	5	–	0	2	–	8	–	0
Montana	1	–	5	–	0	1	–	8	–	0
$ – Conference champion; Rankings from AP Poll

The 1959 Colorado State Rams football team represented Colorado State University in the Skyline Conference during the 1959 college football season. In their fourth season under head coach Don Mullison, the Rams compiled a 6–4 record (5–2 against Skyline opponents), finished second in the Skyline Conference, and were outscored by opponents by a total of 147 to 123.

The team's statistical leaders included Bill Wade with 197 passing yards, Wayne Schneider with 457 rushing yards, and Al Fortune with 99 receiving yards.

== Schedule ==
Date	Opponent	Site	Result	Attendance	Source
September 19	at Pacific (CA)*	Pacific Memorial Stadium; Stockton, CA	W 9–6	17,000–17,500	
September 26	New Mexico	Colorado Field; Fort Collins, CO	W 14–9	8,500	
October 3	Denver	Colorado Field; Fort Collins, CO	W 15–0	9,100–9,101	
October 10	at Wyoming	War Memorial Stadium; Laramie, WY (rivalry)	L 0–29	12,824	
October 17	Arizona State*^{†}	Colorado Field; Fort Collins, CO	L 9–24	9,600	
October 24	at Army*	Michie Stadium; West Point, NY	L 6–25	19,950	
October 31	at Montana	Dornblaser Field; Missoula, MT	W 26–16	5,000	
November 7	Utah State	Colorado Field; Fort Collins, CO	W 10–7	4,000	
November 14	at Utah	Ute Stadium; Salt Lake City, UT	W 21–17	10,348	
November 21	at BYU	Cougar Stadium; Provo, UT	L 13–14	5,310	
*Non-conference game; ^{†}Homecoming
