= 1951 West Texas State Buffaloes football team =

American college football season

1951 West Texas State Buffaloes football
- Conference: Border Conference
- Record: 2–7 (1–5 Border)
- Head coach: Frank Kimbrough (5th season)
- Home stadium: Amarillo Stadium, Buffalo Stadium

1951 Border Conference football standings
	Conf.					Overall
Team	W		L		T	W		L		T
Texas Tech $	4	–	0	–	0	7	–	4	–	0
Arizona State	4	–	1	–	0	6	–	3	–	1
Hardin–Simmons	4	–	1	–	0	6	–	6	–	0
Arizona	3	–	3	–	0	6	–	5	–	0
Texas Western	2	–	4	–	0	3	–	7	–	0
New Mexico A&M	1	–	4	–	0	1	–	9	–	0
West Texas State	1	–	5	–	0	2	–	7	–	0
Arizona State–Flagstaff	0	–	1	–	0	1	–	7	–	0
$ – Conference champion

The 1951 West Texas State Buffaloes football team represented West Texas State College—now known as West Texas A&M University—as a member of the Border Conference during the 1951 college football season. Led by fifth-year head coach Frank Kimbrough, the team Buffaloes compiled an overall record of 2–7 with a mark of 1–5 in conference play, placing seventh in the Border Conference.

== Schedule ==
Date	Time	Opponent	Site	Result	Attendance	Source
September 15		Trinity (TX)*	Amarillo Stadium; Amarillo, TX	L 7–19		
September 22		at Texas Tech	Jones Stadium; Lubbock, TX	L 7–46	16,000	
September 29		McMurry*	Amarillo Stadium; Amarillo, TX	W 28–20		
October 6	9:00 p.m.	at Arizona	Arizona Stadium; Tucson, AZ	L 13–28	17,500	
October 12		North Texas State*	Amarillo Stadium; Amarillo, TX	L 14–42	3,000	
October 27	2:30 p.m.	Hardin–Simmons^{†}	Buffalo Stadium; Canyon, TX	L 6–27	6,000–7,000	
November 3	9:00 p.m.	at Arizona State	Goodwin Stadium; Tempe, AZ	L 0–34	13,000	
November 10		at New Mexico A&M	Memorial Stadium; Las Cruces, NM	W 50–20	2,000	
November 24	2:15 p.m.	Texas Western	Amarillo Stadium; Amarillo, TX	L 6–13	400	
*Non-conference game; ^{†}Homecoming; All times are in Central time
