= 1951 Arizona State Sun Devils football team =

American college football season

1951 Arizona State Sun Devils football
- Conference: Border Conference
- Record: 6–3–1 (4–1 Border)
- Head coach: Larry Siemering (1st season)
- Home stadium: Goodwin Stadium

1951 Border Conference football standings
| | Conf. | | | | | Overall |
| Team | W | | L | | T | W | | L | | T |
|---|---|---|---|---|---|---|---|---|---|---|
| Texas Tech $ | 4 | – | 0 | – | 0 | 7 | – | 4 | – | 0 |
| Arizona State | 4 | – | 1 | – | 0 | 6 | – | 3 | – | 1 |
| Hardin–Simmons | 4 | – | 1 | – | 0 | 6 | – | 6 | – | 0 |
| Arizona | 3 | – | 3 | – | 0 | 6 | – | 5 | – | 0 |
| Texas Western | 2 | – | 4 | – | 0 | 3 | – | 7 | – | 0 |
| New Mexico A&M | 1 | – | 4 | – | 0 | 1 | – | 9 | – | 0 |
| West Texas State | 1 | – | 5 | – | 0 | 2 | – | 7 | – | 0 |
| Arizona State–Flagstaff | 0 | – | 1 | – | 0 | 1 | – | 7 | – | 0 |
$ – Conference champion

The 1951 Arizona State Sun Devils football team was an American football team that represented Arizona State College (later renamed Arizona State University) in the Border Conference during the 1951 college football season. In their first season under head coach Larry Siemering, the Sun Devils compiled a 6–3–1 record (4–1 against Border opponents) and outscored their opponents by a combined total of 308 to 176. The team was ranked at No. 76 in the 1951 Litkenhous Ratings.

== Schedule ==
| Date | Time | Opponent | Site | Result | Attendance | Source |
|---|---|---|---|---|---|---|
| September 22 | | at Utah State* | Romney Stadium; Logan, UT | W 33–27 | 5,800 | |
| September 29 | | at Arkansas* | Razorback Stadium; Fayetteville, AR | L 13–30 | 10,000 | |
| October 6 | | Wayne* | Goodwin Stadium; Tempe, AZ | W 50–6 | | |
| October 13 | | Hardin–Simmons | Goodwin Stadium; Tempe, AZ | L 14–39 | | |
| October 20 | | at San Diego State* | Aztec Bowl; San Diego, CA | T 27–27 | 12,500 | |
| October 27 | | New Mexico A&M | Goodwin Stadium; Tempe, AZ | W 46–0 | | |
| November 3 | 8:00 p.m. | West Texas State^{†} | Goodwin Stadium; Tempe, AZ | W 34–0 | 13,000 | |
| November 10 | | Arizona | Goodwin Stadium; Tempe, AZ (rivalry) | W 61–14 | | |
| November 17 | | at Texas Western | Kidd Field; El Paso, TX | W 23–13 | 5,000 | |
| November 24 | | Wyoming* | Goodwin Stadium; Tempe, AZ | L 7–20 | | |
*Non-conference game; ^{†}Homecoming; All times are in Mountain time
