= 1959 New Mexico Lobos football team =

American college football season

1959 New Mexico Lobos football
- Conference: Skyline Conference
- Record: 7–3 (4–2 Skyline)
- Head coach: Marv Levy (2nd season)
- Home stadium: Zimmerman Field

1959 Skyline Conference football standings
	Conf.					Overall
Team	W		L		T	W		L		T
No. 16 Wyoming $	7	–	0	–	0	9	–	1	–	0
Colorado State	5	–	2	–	0	6	–	4	–	0
New Mexico	4	–	2	–	0	7	–	3	–	0
Utah	3	–	2	–	0	5	–	5	–	0
Utah State	2	–	5	–	0	5	–	6	–	0
BYU	2	–	5	–	0	3	–	7	–	0
Denver	2	–	5	–	0	2	–	8	–	0
Montana	1	–	5	–	0	1	–	8	–	0
$ – Conference champion; Rankings from AP Poll

The 1959 New Mexico Lobos football team represented the University of New Mexico in the Skyline Conference during the 1959 college football season. In their second and final season under head coach Marv Levy, the Lobos compiled a 7–3 record (4–2 against Skyline opponents), finished third in the conference, and outscored all opponents by a total of 260 to 135.

The team's statistical leaders included George Friberg with 361 passing yards and Don Perkins with 636 rushing yards, 226 receiving yards and 66 points scored. Perkins went on to play eight seasons for the Dallas Cowboys and played in six Pro Bowls.

In February 1960, New Mexico head coach Marv Levy was hired as the head football coach at the University of California. Levy compiled a 14–6 record in two seasons at New Mexico.

== Schedule ==
Date	Opponent	Site	Result	Attendance	Source
September 19	New Mexico A&M*	Zimmerman Field; Albuquerque, NM (rivalry)	L 12–29	17,500	
September 26	at Colorado State	Colorado Field; Fort Collins, CO	L 9–14	8,500	
October 3	Texas Western*	Zimmerman Field; Albuquerque, NM	W 17–7		
October 10	at Utah State	Romney Stadium; Logan, UT	W 28–6	5,000	
October 17	at Arizona*	Arizona Stadium; Tucson, AZ (rivalry)	W 28–7	25,500	
October 24	at Montana	Dornblaser Field; Missoula, MT	W 55–14	3,700	
October 31	Denver^{†}	Zimmerman Field; Albuquerque, NM	W 42–0		
November 7	BYU	Zimmerman Field; Albuquerque, NM	W 21–6	10,000	
November 14	Wyoming	Zimmerman Field; Albuquerque, NM	L 20–25	16,000	
November 21	at Air Force*	DU Stadium; Denver, CO	W 28–27	15,742	
*Non-conference game; ^{†}Homecoming
