= 1956 BYU Cougars football team =

American college football season

1956 BYU Cougars football
- Conference: Skyline Conference
- Record: 2–7–1 (1–5–1 Skyline Six)
- Head coach: Hal Kopp (1st season)
- Home stadium: Cougar Stadium

1956 Skyline Conference football standings
	Conf.					Overall
Team	W		L		T	W		L		T
Wyoming	7	–	0	–	0	10	–	0	–	0
Utah	5	–	1	–	0	5	–	5	–	0
Denver	4	–	3	–	0	6	–	4	–	0
Utah State	4	–	3	–	0	6	–	4	–	0
Colorado A&M	2	–	4	–	1	2	–	7	–	1
New Mexico	2	–	4	–	0	4	–	6	–	0
BYU	1	–	5	–	1	2	–	7	–	1
Montana	1	–	6	–	0	1	–	9	–	0
$ – Conference champion

The 1956 BYU Cougars football team was an American football team that represented Brigham Young University (BYU) as a member of the Skyline Conference during the 1956 college football season. In their first season under head coach Hal Kopp, the Cougars compiled an overall record of 2–7–1 with a mark of 1–5–1 against conference opponents, finished seventh in the Skyline, and were outscored by a total of 232 to 147.

The team's statistical leaders included Carroll Johnston with 945 passing yards and 1,025 yards of total offense, Steve Campora with 259 rushing yards and 24 points, and Burt Bullock with 291 receiving yards.

== Schedule ==
Date	Opponent	Site	Result	Attendance	Source
September 15	at Wichita*	Veterans Field; Wichita, KS	L 0–13	14,302	
September 22	Fresno State*	Cougar Stadium; Provo, UT	L 13–26	8,330	
September 29	at Colorado A&M	Colorado Field; Fort Collins, CO	T 0–0	6,740	
October 5	Utah	Cougar Stadium; Provo, UT (rivalry)	L 6–41	15,055	
October 20	at Montana	Dornblaser Field; Missoula, MT	L 14–21	6,000	
October 27	at Utah State	Romney Stadium; Logan, UT (rivalry)	L 7–33	10,000	
November 3	New Mexico	Cougar Stadium; Provo, UT	W 33–12	5,523	
November 10	at Denver	DU Stadium; Denver, CO	L 34–58	10,000–10,069	
November 17	Wyoming	Cougar Stadium; Provo, UT	L 6–7	4,447	
November 24	vs. Air Force*	DU Stadium; Denver, CO	W 34–21	7,127	
*Non-conference game
