= 1957 BYU Cougars football team =

American college football season

1957 BYU Cougars football
- Conference: Skyline Conference
- Record: 5–3–2 (5–1–1 Skyline Six)
- Head coach: Hal Kopp (2nd season)
- Home stadium: Cougar Stadium

1957 Skyline Conference football standings
	Conf.					Overall
Team	W		L		T	W		L		T
Utah $	5	–	1	–	0	6	–	4	–	0
BYU	5	–	1	–	1	5	–	3	–	2
Denver	5	–	2	–	0	6	–	4	–	0
Wyoming	3	–	2	–	2	4	–	3	–	3
New Mexico	2	–	4	–	0	4	–	6	–	0
Colorado State	2	–	5	–	0	3	–	7	–	0
Montana	2	–	5	–	0	2	–	7	–	0
Utah State	1	–	5	–	1	2	–	7	–	1
$ – Conference champion

The 1957 BYU Cougars football team was an American football team that represented Brigham Young University (BYU) as a member of the Skyline Conference during the 1957 college football season. In their second season under head coach Hal Kopp, the Cougars compiled an overall record of 5–3–2 with a mark of 5–1–1 against conference opponents, finished second in the Skyline, and were outscored by a total of 138 to 134.

The team's statistical leaders included Carroll Johnston with 447 passing yards, Weldon Jackson with 605 rushing yards and 605 yards of total offense, Steve Campora with 19 points, and R. K. Brown with 183 receiving yards. The roster also included Mel Brown.

== Schedule ==
Date	Opponent	Site	Result	Attendance	Source
September 21	at Arizona*	Arizona Stadium; Tucson, AZ	T 14–14	23,000	
September 28	at Kansas State*	Memorial Stadium; Manhattan, KS	L 7–36	13,000	
October 4	Montana	Cougar Stadium; Provo, UT	W 20–7	10,876	
October 12	at Utah	Ute Stadium; Salt Lake City, UT (rivalry)	L 0–27	26,175	
October 19	at Wyoming	War Memorial Stadium; Laramie, WY	T 0–0	9,018	
October 26	Denver^{†}	Cougar Stadium; Provo, UT	W 25–6	11,017	
November 2	Utah State	Cougar Stadium; Provo, UT (rivalry)	W 14–0	7,244	
November 9	at Fresno State*	Ratcliffe Stadium; Fresno, CA	L 14–27	7,523	
November 23	Colorado State	Cougar Stadium; Provo, UT	W 26–9	6,413	
November 30	at New Mexico	Zimmerman Field; Albuquerque, NM	W 14–12	6,000	
*Non-conference game; ^{†}Homecoming
