= 1951 New Mexico Lobos football team =

American college football season

1951 New Mexico Lobos football
- Conference: Skyline Conference
- Record: 4–7 (2–4 Skyline)
- Head coach: Dudley DeGroot (2nd season)
- Home stadium: Zimmerman Field

1951 Skyline Conference football standings
	Conf.					Overall
Team	W		L		T	W		L		T
Utah $	4	–	1	–	0	7	–	4	–	0
Wyoming	5	–	1	–	1	7	–	2	–	1
Denver	4	–	3	–	0	6	–	4	–	0
Colorado A&M	3	–	3	–	1	5	–	4	–	1
BYU	2	–	3	–	1	6	–	3	–	1
Utah State	2	–	4	–	1	3	–	5	–	1
New Mexico	2	–	4	–	0	4	–	7	–	0
Montana	1	–	4	–	0	2	–	7	–	0
$ – Conference champion

The 1951 New Mexico Lobos football team represented the University of New Mexico in the Skyline Conference during the 1951 college football season. In their second season under head coach Dudley DeGroot, the Lobos compiled a 4–7 record (2–4 against Skyline opponents), tied for sixth in the conference, and were outscored by opponents by a total of 262 to 213.

== Schedule ==
Date	Opponent	Site	Result	Attendance	Source
September 22	Arizona State–Flagstaff*	Zimmerman Field; Albuquerque, NM	W 55–6	7,500	
September 29	at Montana	Dornblaser Field; Missoula, MT	L 7–25		
October 6	at New Mexico A&M*	Memorial Stadium; Las Cruces, NM (rivalry)	W 20–0	6,200	
October 13	at Denver	Hilltop Stadium; Denver, CO	L 17–33		
October 20	at Texas Western*	Kidd Field; El Paso, TX	L 7–32		
October 27	Colorado A&M	Zimmerman Field; Albuquerque, NM	L 15–20	7,500	
November 3	at Arizona*	Arizona Stadium; Tucson, AZ (rivalry)	L 20–32	15,000	
November 10	Wyoming	Zimmerman Field; Albuquerque, NM	L 7–41		
November 17	BYU^{†}	Zimmerman Field; Albuquerque, NM	W 34–0	8,500	
November 24	Texas Tech*	Zimmerman Field; Albuquerque, NM	L 14–60		
December 1	Utah State	Zimmerman Field; Albuquerque, NM	W 17–13		
*Non-conference game; ^{†}Homecoming
