= 1959 Utah Utes football team =

American college football season

1959 Utah Utes football
- Conference: Skyline Conference
- Record: 5–5 (3–2 Skyline)
- Head coach: Ray Nagel (2nd season)
- Home stadium: Ute Stadium

1959 Skyline Conference football standings
	Conf.					Overall
Team	W		L		T	W		L		T
No. 16 Wyoming $	7	–	0	–	0	9	–	1	–	0
Colorado State	5	–	2	–	0	6	–	4	–	0
New Mexico	4	–	2	–	0	7	–	3	–	0
Utah	3	–	2	–	0	5	–	5	–	0
Utah State	2	–	5	–	0	5	–	6	–	0
BYU	2	–	5	–	0	3	–	7	–	0
Denver	2	–	5	–	0	2	–	8	–	0
Montana	1	–	5	–	0	1	–	8	–	0
$ – Conference champion; Rankings from AP Poll

The 1959 Utah Utes football team was an American football team that represented the University of Utah as a member of the Skyline Conference during the 1959 college football season. In their second season under head coach Ray Nagel, the Utes compiled an overall record of 5–5 with a mark of 3–2 against conference opponents, placing fourth in the Skyline. Home games were played on campus at Ute Stadium in Salt Lake City.

Utah was led on the field by junior quarterback Terry Nofsinger and senior safety and halfback Larry Wilson, a future member of the Pro Football Hall of Fame.

Conference members New Mexico and Montana were not played in 1960, and the Utes defeated both in-state rivals: BYU by 12 points and Utah State by 14. For the first of two consecutive seasons, Utah did not face longtime rival Colorado; they first played in 1903 and had met every year except two (1909, 1918). The series resumed in 1961 and 1962, then went on hiatus until 2011, when both schools joined the Pac-12 Conference.

== Schedule ==
Date	Opponent	Site	Result	Attendance	Source
September 26	at Oregon*	Hayward Field; Eugene, OR	L 6–21	15,200	
October 3	at Washington*	Husky Stadium; Seattle, WA	L 6–51	27,560	
October 9	BYU	Ute Stadium; Salt Lake City, UT (rivalry)	W 20–8	17,121	
October 16	at Denver	DU Stadium; Denver, CO	W 26–12	6,184	
October 24	Wyoming^{†}	Ute Stadium; Salt Lake City, UT	L 7–21	24,739	
October 31	Arizona*	Ute Stadium; Salt Lake City, UT	W 54–6	10,063	
November 7	vs. Idaho*	Bronco Stadium; Boise, ID	W 47–13	8,500	
November 14	Colorado State	Ute Stadium; Salt Lake City, UT	L 17–21	10,348	
November 21	Utah State	Ute Stadium; Salt Lake City, UT (rivalry)	W 35–21	13,809	
November 28	at No. 20 UCLA*	Los Angeles Memorial Coliseum; Los Angeles, CA	L 6–21	19,528–19,600	
*Non-conference game; ^{†}Homecoming; Rankings from AP Poll released prior to the game

== NFL draft ==
Utah had two players selected in the 1960 NFL draft.

Player	Position	Round	Pick	NFL team
Larry Wilson	Defensive back	7	74	St. Louis Cardinals
Tony Polychronis	Offensive tackle	18	216	New York Giants

Larry Wilson played 13 seasons in the National Football League and was inducted into the Pro Football Hall of Fame in 1978, his first year of eligibility.
