= 1951 Arizona State–Flagstaff Lumberjacks football team =

American college football season

1951 Arizona State–Flagstaff Lumberjacks football
- Conference: Border Conference
- Record: 1–7 (0–1 Border)
- Head coach: John Pederson (1st season)
- Home stadium: Skidmore Field

1951 Border Conference football standings
| | Conf. | | | | | Overall |
| Team | W | | L | | T | W | | L | | T |
|---|---|---|---|---|---|---|---|---|---|---|
| Texas Tech $ | 4 | – | 0 | – | 0 | 7 | – | 4 | – | 0 |
| Arizona State | 4 | – | 1 | – | 0 | 6 | – | 3 | – | 1 |
| Hardin–Simmons | 4 | – | 1 | – | 0 | 6 | – | 6 | – | 0 |
| Arizona | 3 | – | 3 | – | 0 | 6 | – | 5 | – | 0 |
| Texas Western | 2 | – | 4 | – | 0 | 3 | – | 7 | – | 0 |
| New Mexico A&M | 1 | – | 4 | – | 0 | 1 | – | 9 | – | 0 |
| West Texas State | 1 | – | 5 | – | 0 | 2 | – | 7 | – | 0 |
| Arizona State–Flagstaff | 0 | – | 1 | – | 0 | 1 | – | 7 | – | 0 |
$ – Conference champion

The 1951 Arizona State–Flagstaff Lumberjacks football team was an American football team that represented Arizona State College at Flagstaff (now known as Northern Arizona University) in the Border Conference during the 1951 college football season. In its first year under head coach John Pederson, the team compiled a 1–7 record (0–1 against conference opponents), was outscored by a total of 211 to 76, and finished last of eight teams in the Border Conference.

The team played its home games at Skidmore Field in Flagstaff, Arizona.

== Schedule ==
| Date | Opponent | Site | Result | Attendance | Source |
|---|---|---|---|---|---|
| September 14 | at New Mexico Highlands* | Las Vegas, NM | L 6–13 | | |
| September 22 | at New Mexico* | Zimmerman Field; Albuquerque, NM | L 6–55 | 7,500 | |
| September 29 | Caltech* | Skidmore Field; Flagstaff, AZ | L 14–28 | | |
| October 6 | Whittier* | Skidmore Field; Flagstaff, AZ | W 6–0 | | |
| October 20 | La Verne*^{†} | Skidmore Field; Flagstaff, AZ | L 12–13 | | |
| October 27 | at Idaho State* | Pocatello, ID | L 20–34 | | |
| November 3 | at New Mexico A&M | Memorial Stadium; Las Cruces, NM | L 12–48 | | |
| November 12 | New Mexico Western* | Skidmore Field; Flagstaff, AZ | L 0–20 | | |
*Non-conference game; ^{†}Homecoming
