= John Roning =

American football coach (1910–2001)

Biographical details
- Born: December 2, 1910; Red Wing, Minnesota, U.S.
- Died: October 3, 2001 (aged 90); Denver, Colorado, U.S.

Playing career
- 1932–1934: Minnesota
- Position: End

Coaching career (HC unless noted)
- 1937–1938: Red Wing HS (MN)
- 1939–1941: Gustavus Adolphus
- 1942: Minnesota (ends)
- 1943–1944: North Carolina Pre-Flight (ends)
- 1946–1950: Minnesota (backfield)
- 1951–1954: Utah Agricultural
- 1955–1960: Denver

Administrative career (AD unless noted)
- 1939–1942: Gustavus Adolphus
- 1961–1971: South Dakota
- 1971–1977: Big Sky (commissioner)

Head coaching record
- Overall: 61–59–3 (college)

Accomplishments and honors

Championships
- 1 MIAC (1940)

John Olaf Roning (December 2, 1910 – October 3, 2001) was an American college football player, coach, and athletics administrator. After he played end at the University of Minnesota from 1932 to 1934, Roning entered the coaching ranks. After a few years coaching in the high school ranks, Roning became the head football coach at Gustavus Adolphus College in 1939. He left in 1942 to return to Minnesota as an assistant and then was at North Carolina Pre-Flight. In 1951, Roning became the head football coach at Utah Agricultural College—now known as Utah State University—in Logan for four seasons and then at the University of Denver. He was the athletic director at the University of South Dakota from 1961 to 1971 and the second commissioner of the Big Sky Conference (1971–1977).

== Early life and career ==
Roning was an end for Bernie Bierman at Minnesota from the 1932 through the 1934 seasons. He started at end during their 1934 national championship season. In 1939, Roning took over at Gustavus Adolphus College where he served as athletic director, football, basketball and track coach. During his tenure as football head coach, Roning led the Gusties to an overall record of 17 wins, five losses and one tie (17–5–1). He led the Gusties to the 1940 Minnesota Intercollegiate Athletic Conference (MIAC) championship; however, the school was suspended from the MIAC for the 1941 season for its perceived "overemphasis" on collegiate athletics. From Adolphus, Roning served as an assistant coach at Minnesota, with North Carolina Pre-Flight and again at Minnesota before he became head coach at Utah Agricultural.

== Utah Agricultural and Denver ==
Roning was hired at Utah Agricultural in January 1951 to replace George Melinkovich. During his four-year tenure as head coach of the Aggies, Roning had an overall record of 18 wins, 21 losses and two ties (18–21–2). In February 1955, he became the head coach of the Denver Pioneers. During his six seasons there, Roning had a 27–13 overall record. After the 1960 season, the university decided to drop football due to the costs of operating the program.

== Later life ==
After the closure of the Denver football program, Roning accepted the position of athletic director at the University of South Dakota in Vermillion in 1961. He remained at South Dakota until 1971, when he followed Jack Friel as commissioner of the Big Sky Conference; he served until June 1977, succeeded by Steve Belko.

Roning retired to Denver, Colorado, where he resided until his death at age 90 on October 3, 2001.

== Head coaching record ==
Year	Team	Overall	Conference	Standing
Gustavus Adolphus Gusties (Minnesota Intercollegiate Athletic Conference) (1939–1941)
1939	Gustavus Adolphus	6–2	3–2	4th
1940	Gustavus Adolphus	7–1	5–0	1st
1941	Gustavus Adolphus	4–2–1		
Gustavus Adolphus:		17–5–1	8–2	
Utah State Aggies (Skyline Conference) (1951–1954)
1951	Utah State	3–5–1	2–4–1	6th
1952	Utah State	3–7–1	3–4	T–5th
1953	Utah State	8–3	5–4	2nd
1954	Utah State	4–6	4–3	3rd
Utah State:		18–21–2	14–15–1	
Denver Pioneers (Skyline Conference) (1955–1960)
1955	Denver	8–2	5–2	T–3rd
1956	Denver	6–4	4–3	T–3rd
1957	Denver	6–4	5–2	3rd
1958	Denver	2–8	2–5	T–6th
1959	Denver	2–8	2–5	T–5th
1960	Denver	3–7	1–6	T–7th
Denver:		27–33	19–23	
Total:		61–59–3		
National championship Conference title Conference division title or championship game berth
