= 1951 Utah Utes football team =

American college football season

1951 Utah Utes football

Skyline champion
- Conference: Skyline Conference
- Record: 7–4 (4–1 Skyline)
- Head coach: Jack Curtice (2nd season)
- Home stadium: Ute Stadium

1951 Skyline Conference football standings
	Conf.					Overall
Team	W		L		T	W		L		T
Utah $	4	–	1	–	0	7	–	4	–	0
Wyoming	5	–	1	–	1	7	–	2	–	1
Denver	4	–	3	–	0	6	–	4	–	0
Colorado A&M	3	–	3	–	1	5	–	4	–	1
BYU	2	–	3	–	1	6	–	3	–	1
Utah State	2	–	4	–	1	3	–	5	–	1
New Mexico	2	–	4	–	0	4	–	7	–	0
Montana	1	–	4	–	0	2	–	7	–	0
$ – Conference champion

The 1951 Utah Utes football team, or also commonly known as the Utah Redskins, was an American football team that represented the University of Utah as a member of the Skyline Conference during the 1951 college football season. In their second season under head coach Jack Curtice, the Utes compiled an overall record of 7–4 with a mark of 4–1 against conference opponents, winning Skyline title.

== Schedule ==
Date	Opponent	Site	Result	Attendance	Source
September 15	Montana State*	Ute Stadium; Salt Lake City, UT	W 55–6	10,273	
September 22	at Arizona*	Arizona Stadium; Tucson, AZ	W 27–7	21,500	
September 29	at Oregon State*	Bell Field; Corvallis, OR	L 28–61	9,000–10,000	
October 6	BYU	Ute Stadium; Salt Lake City, UT (rivalry)	W 7–6	21,459	
October 13	at Kansas*	Memorial Stadium; Lawrence, KS	L 7–26	20,000	
October 20	Denver^{†}	Ute Stadium; Salt Lake City, UT	W 17–14	12,277	
October 27	Wyoming	Ute Stadium; Salt Lake City, UT	L 0–13	15,738	
November 3	at Utah State	Romney Stadium; Logan, UT (rivalry)	W 28–20	11,000	
November 10	at Colorado*	Folsom Field; Boulder, CO (rivalry)	L 0–54	14,048	
November 17	Colorado A&M	Ute Stadium; Salt Lake City, UT	W 27–21	9,038	
November 22	Idaho*	Ute Stadium; Salt Lake City, UT	W 40–19	11,934	
*Non-conference game; ^{†}Homecoming

== NFL draft ==
Utah had two players selected in the 1952 NFL draft.

Player	Position	Round	Pick	NFL team
Wes Gardner	Center	7	82	Detroit Lions
Tom Dublinski	Quarterback	8	93	Detroit Lions
