= 1954 BYU Cougars football team =

American college football season

1954 BYU Cougars football
- Conference: Skyline Conference
- Record: 1–8 (1–6 Skyline Six)
- Head coach: Chick Atkinson (6th season)
- Home stadium: Cougar Stadium

1954 Skyline Conference football standings
| | Conf. | | | | | Overall |
| Team | W | | L | | T | W | | L | | T |
|---|---|---|---|---|---|---|---|---|---|---|
| Denver $ | 6 | – | 1 | – | 0 | 9 | – | 1 | – | 0 |
| Wyoming | 5 | – | 1 | – | 0 | 6 | – | 4 | – | 0 |
| Utah State | 4 | – | 3 | – | 0 | 4 | – | 6 | – | 0 |
| New Mexico | 3 | – | 3 | – | 0 | 5 | – | 5 | – | 0 |
| Utah | 3 | – | 3 | – | 0 | 4 | – | 7 | – | 0 |
| Colorado A&M | 3 | – | 4 | – | 0 | 3 | – | 7 | – | 0 |
| Montana | 1 | – | 5 | – | 0 | 3 | – | 6 | – | 0 |
| BYU | 1 | – | 6 | – | 0 | 1 | – | 8 | – | 0 |
$ – Conference champion

The 1954 BYU Cougars football team was an American football team that represented Brigham Young University (BYU) as a member of the Skyline Conference during the 1954 college football season. In their sixth season under head coach Chick Atkinson, the Cougars compiled an overall record of 1–8 with a mark of 1–6 against conference opponents, finished last out of eight teams in the Skyline, and were outscored by a total of 188 to 96.

The team's statistical leaders included Ron Bean with 441 yards of total offense (4 rushing, 437 passing), Dick Felt with 379 rushing yards, and Phil Oyler with 18 points scored.

== Schedule ==
| Date | Opponent | Site | Result | Attendance | Source |
|---|---|---|---|---|---|
| September 18 | New Mexico | Cougar Stadium; Provo, UT | L 12–21 | 5,641 | |
| September 24 | Arizona State* | Cougar Stadium; Provo, UT | L 19–28 | 5,683 | |
| October 2 | at Colorado A&M | Colorado Field; Fort Collins, CO | L 13–14 | 5,000 | |
| October 9 | Utah | Cougar Stadium; Provo, UT (rivalry) | L 7–12 | 13,702 | |
| October 23 | Montana | Cougar Stadium; Provo, UT | W 19–7 | 7,197 | |
| October 30 | at Utah State | Romney Stadium; Logan, UT (rivalry) | L 13–45 | 11,200 | |
| November 6 | Denver | Cougar Stadium; Provo, UT | L 0–20 | 12,903 | |
| November 13 | Wyoming | Cougar Stadium; Provo, UT | L 13–34 | 3,824 | |
| November 20 | vs. Idaho* | Bronco Stadium; Boise, ID | L 0–7 | 10,000 | |
*Non-conference game
