= 1959 Utah State Aggies football team =

American college football season

1959 Utah State Aggies football
- Conference: Skyline Conference
- Record: 5–6 (2–5 Skyline)
- Head coach: John Ralston (1st season)
- Home stadium: Romney Stadium

1959 Skyline Conference football standings
	Conf.					Overall
Team	W		L		T	W		L		T
No. 16 Wyoming $	7	–	0	–	0	9	–	1	–	0
Colorado State	5	–	2	–	0	6	–	4	–	0
New Mexico	4	–	2	–	0	7	–	3	–	0
Utah	3	–	2	–	0	5	–	5	–	0
Utah State	2	–	5	–	0	5	–	6	–	0
BYU	2	–	5	–	0	3	–	7	–	0
Denver	2	–	5	–	0	2	–	8	–	0
Montana	1	–	5	–	0	1	–	8	–	0
$ – Conference champion; Rankings from AP Poll

The 1959 Utah State Aggies football team was an American football team that represented Utah State University in the Skyline Conference during the 1959 college football season. In their first season under head coach John Ralston, the Aggies compiled a 5–6 record (2–5 against Skyline opponents), finished in a three-way tie for fifth in the Skyline Conference, and were outscored by opponents by a total of 185 to 181.

== Schedule ==
Date	Opponent	Site	Result	Attendance	Source
September 20	Idaho*	Romney Stadium; Logan, UT	W 14–0	3,200	
September 26	at Arizona State*	Sun Devil Stadium; Tempe, AZ	L 12–34	25,300	
October 3	at Wyoming	War Memorial Stadium (rivalry); Laramie, WY	L 2–27	9,685	
October 10	New Mexico	Romney Stadium; Logan, UT	L 6–28	5,000	
October 17	Montana	Romney Stadium; Logan, UT	W 28–0	3,400	
October 24	No. 10 Montana State*	Romney Stadium; Logan, UT	W 22–13	7,700	
October 31	at BYU	Cougar Stadium; Provo, UT (rivalry)	L 0–18	6,924	
November 7	at Colorado State	Colorado Field; Fort Collins, CO	L 7–10	4,000	
November 14	at Denver	DU Stadium; Denver, CO	W 21–14	7,265	
November 21	at Utah	Ute Stadium; Salt Lake City, UT (rivalry)	L 21–35	13,809	
December 11	at Hawaii*	Honolulu Stadium; Honolulu, HI	W 48–6	7,000	
*Non-conference game; Rankings from UPI Poll released prior to the game
