= Denver Pioneers football, 1950–1960 =

American college football season

1950–1960 Denver Pioneers football
- Conference: Skyline Conference
- Head coach: Johnny Baker (1948–1952); Bob Blackman (1953–1954); John Roning (1955–1960)

The Denver Ministers football program, 1950–1960 represented the University of Denver in college football from 1950 to 1960 as a member of the Skyline Conference. The program was led by three head coaches: Johnny Baker (1948–1952), Bob Blackman (1953–1954), and John Roning (1955–1960).

Highlights of the decade included:

- The 1954 team compiled a 9–1 record, won the Skyline championship, was ranked No. 18 in the final UPI poll, and outscored opponents by a total of 298 to 96.
- The 1955 team compiled an 8–2 record and outscored opponents by a total of 310 to 89.
- After compiling a combined record of 7–23 from 1958 to 1960, and with the program sustaining six-digit annual losses, the University of Denver announced in January 1961 that it was discontinuing its football program.

== 1950 ==
1950 Denver Pioneers football

Pineapple Bowl, L 27–28 vs. Hawaii
- Conference: Skyline Conference
- Record: 3–8–1 (2–2–1 Skyline)
- Head coach: Johnny Baker (3rd season)
- Home stadium: Hilltop Stadium

1950 Skyline Conference football standings
	Conf.					Overall
Team	W		L		T	W		L		T
No. 12 Wyoming $	5	–	0	–	0	10	–	0	–	0
Colorado A&M	4	–	1	–	0	6	–	3	–	0
Denver	2	–	2	–	1	3	–	8	–	1
Utah	1	–	2	–	2	3	–	4	–	3
BYU	1	–	3	–	1	4	–	5	–	1
Utah State	0	–	5	–	0	2	–	9	–	0
$ – Conference champion; Rankings from AP Poll

The 1950 Denver Pioneers football team represented the University of Denver as a member of the Skyline Conference during the 1950 college football season. In its third season under head coach Johnny Baker, the team compiled a 3–8–1 record (2–2–1 against conference opponents), finished third in the conference, lost to Hawaii in the Pineapple Bowl, and outscored all opponents by a total of 265 to 260. Gordon Cooper led all players in major college football in 1950 with 46 pass receptions, good for 569 yards and eight touchdowns.

=== Schedule ===
Date	Opponent	Site	Result	Attendance	Source
September 15	at Drake*	Drake Stadium; Des Moines, IA	L 0–7	8,000	
September 23	Colorado A&M	Hilltop Stadium; Denver, CO	L 14–30	27,000	
September 29	Kansas*	Hilltop Stadium; Denver, CO	L 6–46	14,218	
October 6	Pacific (CA)*	Hilltop Stadium; Denver, CO	L 6–41	12,000	
October 13	Utah	Hilltop Stadium; Denver, CO	T 14–14	11,754	
October 21	BYU	Hilltop Stadium; Denver, CO	W 42–3	11,000	
October 28	at Arizona*	Arizona Stadium; Tucson, AZ	L 14–19	18,000	
November 4	at San Francisco*	Kezar Stadium; San Francisco, CA	L 6–24	9,738	
November 11	Utah State	Hilltop Stadium; Denver, CO	W 48–0	7,960	
November 23	No. 12 Wyoming	Hilltop Stadium; Denver, CO	L 12–42	28,700	
December 25	at Leilehua All-Stars*	Honolulu Stadium; Honolulu, Territory of Hawaii	W 76–6	3,500	
January 1, 1951	at Hawaii*	Honolulu Stadium; Honolulu, Territory of Hawaii (Pineapple Bowl)	L 27–28	11,000	
*Non-conference game; Rankings from AP Poll released prior to the game

== 1951 ==
1951 Denver Pioneers football
- Conference: Skyline Conference
- Record: 6–4 (4–3 Skyline)
- Head coach: Johnny Baker (4th season)
- Home stadium: Hilltop Stadium

1951 Skyline Conference football standings
	Conf.					Overall
Team	W		L		T	W		L		T
Utah $	4	–	1	–	0	7	–	4	–	0
Wyoming	5	–	1	–	1	7	–	2	–	1
Denver	4	–	3	–	0	6	–	4	–	0
Colorado A&M	3	–	3	–	1	5	–	4	–	1
BYU	2	–	3	–	1	6	–	3	–	1
Utah State	2	–	4	–	1	3	–	5	–	1
New Mexico	2	–	4	–	0	4	–	7	–	0
Montana	1	–	4	–	0	2	–	7	–	0
$ – Conference champion

The 1951 Denver Pioneers football team represented the University of Denver as a member of the Skyline Conference during the 1951 college football season. In their fourth season under head coach Johnny Baker, the Pioneers compiled a 6–4 record (4–3 against conference opponents), finished third in the conference, and outscored opponents by a total of 283 to 133. The team was ranked at No. 77 in the 1951 Litkenhous Ratings.

=== Schedule ===
Date	Opponent	Site	Result	Attendance	Source
September 15	Colorado College*	Hilltop Stadium; Denver, CO	W 41–0		
September 22	Drake*	Hilltop Stadium; Denver, CO	L 7–20	15,680	
September 29	at Wyoming	War Memorial Stadium; Laramie, WY	L 14–20	14,020	
October 6	Montana	Hilltop Stadium; Denver, CO	W 55–0		
October 13	New Mexico	Hilltop Stadium; Denver, CO	W 33–17		
October 20	at Utah	Ute Stadium; Salt Lake City, UT	L 14–17	12,277	
October 27	BYU	Hilltop Stadium; Denver, CO	W 56–6	12,359	
November 10	at No. 19 Pacific (CA)*	Pacific Memorial Stadium; Stockton, CA	W 35–33	10,469	
November 17	Utah State	Hilltop Stadium; Denver, CO	L 7–14		
November 22	Colorado A&M	Hilltop Stadium; Denver, CO	W 21–6		
*Non-conference game; Rankings from Coaches' Poll released prior to the game

== 1952 ==
1952 Denver Pioneers football
- Conference: Skyline Conference
- Record: 3–7 (0–7 Skyline)
- Head coach: Johnny Baker (5th season)
- Home stadium: Hilltop Stadium

1952 Skyline Conference football standings
	Conf.					Overall
Team	W		L		T	W		L		T
Utah $	5	–	0	–	0	6	–	3	–	1
New Mexico	5	–	1	–	0	7	–	2	–	0
Colorado A&M	5	–	2	–	0	6	–	4	–	0
Wyoming	4	–	3	–	0	5	–	4	–	0
BYU	3	–	4	–	0	4	–	6	–	0
Utah State	3	–	4	–	0	3	–	7	–	1
Montana	1	–	5	–	0	2	–	7	–	1
Denver	0	–	7	–	0	3	–	7	–	0
$ – Conference champion

The 1952 Denver Pioneers football team represented the University of Denver as a member of the Skyline Conference during the 1952 college football season. In their fifth and final season under head coach Johnny Baker, the Pioneers compiled a 3–7 record (0–7 against conference opponents), finished last out of eight teams in the conference, and were outscored by a total of 190 to 143.

=== Schedule ===
Date	Time	Opponent	Site	Result	Attendance	Source
September 20		Colorado College*	Hilltop Stadium; Denver, CO	W 34–12		
September 27		Lowry Field*	Hilltop Stadium; Denver, CO	W 29–0	8,734	
October 4		Colorado A&M	Hilltop Stadium; Denver, CO	L 6–28		
October 11		Montana	Hilltop Stadium; Denver, CO	L 7–17		
October 18		Utah^{†}	Hilltop Stadium; Denver, CO	L 0–35	6,574	
October 25		at BYU	Cougar Stadium; Provo, UT	L 13–14	9,431	
November 1	12:30 p.m.	at Drake*	Drake Stadium; Des Moines, IA	W 27–19	6,000	
November 8		New Mexico	Hilltop Stadium; Denver, CO	L 0–15	4,000	
November 22		at Utah State	Romney Stadium; Logan, UT	L 13–29		
November 27		Wyoming	Hilltop Stadium; Denver, CO	L 14–21		
*Non-conference game; ^{†}Homecoming; All times are in Mountain time

== 1953 ==
1953 Denver Pioneers football
- Conference: Skyline Conference
- Record: 3–5–2 (1–5–1 Skyline)
- Head coach: Bob Blackman (1st season)
- Home stadium: DU Stadium

1953 Skyline Conference football standings
	Conf.					Overall
Team	W		L		T	W		L		T
Utah $	5	–	0	–	0	8	–	2	–	0
Utah State	5	–	2	–	0	8	–	3	–	0
Wyoming	4	–	2	–	1	5	–	4	–	1
New Mexico	3	–	2	–	1	5	–	3	–	1
Colorado A&M	3	–	4	–	0	4	–	5	–	0
Montana	2	–	4	–	0	3	–	5	–	0
Denver	1	–	5	–	1	3	–	5	–	2
BYU	1	–	5	–	1	2	–	7	–	1
$ – Conference champion

The 1953 Denver Pioneers football team represented the University of Denver as a member of the Skyline Conference during the 1953 college football season. In their first season under head coach Bob Blackman, the Pioneers compiled a 3–5–2 record (1–5–1 against conference opponents), tied for last place in the Skyline, and were outscored by a total of 195 to 159.

=== Schedule ===
Date	Opponent	Site	Result	Attendance	Source
September 18	at Colorado College*	Washburn Field; Colorado Springs, CO	W 19–13	7,052	
September 26	Drake*	DU Stadium; Denver, CO	W 33–14	7,055	
October 3	at Colorado A&M	Colorado Field; Fort Collins, CO	L 6–21	8,500–9,000	
October 10	Montana	DU Stadium; Denver, CO	L 13–22	7,675	
October 17	at Utah	Ute Stadium; Salt Lake City, UT	L 6–40	9,162	
October 23	BYU	DU Stadium; Denver, CO	W 27–19	5,168	
October 31	at New Mexico	Zimmerman Field; Albuquerque, NM	L 18–20	12,500	
November 7	at Wichita*	Veterans Field; Wichita, KS	T 12–12	6,775	
November 14	Utah State	DU Stadium; Denver, CO	L 12–21	12,858	
November 26	Wyoming	DU Stadium; Denver, CO	T 13–13	12,299	
*Non-conference game

== 1954 ==
1954 Denver Pioneers football

Skyline champion
- Conference: Skyline Conference

Ranking
- Coaches: No. 18
- Record: 9–1 (6–1 Skyline)
- Head coach: Bob Blackman (2nd season)
- Home stadium: Hilltop Stadium

1954 Skyline Conference football standings
	Conf.					Overall
Team	W		L		T	W		L		T
Denver $	6	–	1	–	0	9	–	1	–	0
Wyoming	5	–	1	–	0	6	–	4	–	0
Utah State	4	–	3	–	0	4	–	6	–	0
New Mexico	3	–	3	–	0	5	–	5	–	0
Utah	3	–	3	–	0	4	–	7	–	0
Colorado A&M	3	–	4	–	0	3	–	7	–	0
Montana	1	–	5	–	0	3	–	6	–	0
BYU	1	–	6	–	0	1	–	8	–	0
$ – Conference champion

The 1954 Denver Pioneers football team was an American football team that represented the University of Denver as a member of the Skyline Conference during the 1954 college football season. In their second and final season under head coach Bob Blackman, the Pioneers compiled a 9–1 record (6–1 against conference opponents), won the Skyline championship, were ranked No. 18 in the final Coaches Poll, and outscored opponents by a total of 298 to 96.

The 1954 team was inducted as a group into the University of Denver Athletic Hall of Fame in 2007. At the time, the group was "widely considered the greatest in DU history".

=== Schedule ===
Date	Time	Opponent	Site	Result	Attendance	Source
September 18		at Colorado College*	Hilltop Stadium; Denver, CO	W 72–0	19,000–19,008	
September 24	8:00 p.m.	at Drake*	Drake Stadium; Des Moines, IA	W 33–13	3,500	
October 2		at Wyoming	War Memorial Stadium; Laramie, WY	L 21–23	10,202–10,500	
October 8		Montana	Hilltop Stadium; Denver, CO	W 19–13	12,426–12,436	
October 16		at Utah	Ute Stadium; Salt Lake City, UT	W 28–20	18,137–18,179	
October 22		Wichita	Hilltop Stadium; Denver, CO	W 27–14	15,076	
October 29		New Mexico	Hilltop Stadium; Denver, CO	W 19–6	10,968	
November 6		at BYU^{†}	Cougar Stadium; Provo, UT	W 20–0	12,903	
November 13		at Utah State	Romney Stadium; Logan, UT	W 25–7	3,500	
November 25		Colorado A&M	Hilltop Stadium; Denver, CO	W 34–0	23,902	
*Non-conference game; ^{†}Homecoming; All times are in Mountain time

== 1955 ==
1955 Denver Pioneers football
- Conference: Skyline Conference
- Record: 8–2 (5–2 Skyline)
- Head coach: John Roning (1st season)
- Home stadium: Hilltop Stadium

1955 Skyline Conference football standings
	Conf.					Overall
Team	W		L		T	W		L		T
Colorado A&M $	6	–	1	–	0	8	–	2	–	0
Utah	4	–	1	–	0	6	–	3	–	0
Denver	5	–	2	–	0	8	–	2	–	0
Wyoming	5	–	2	–	0	8	–	3	–	0
Utah State	3	–	4	–	0	4	–	6	–	0
Montana	2	–	4	–	0	3	–	7	–	0
New Mexico	1	–	5	–	0	2	–	8	–	0
BYU	0	–	7	–	0	1	–	9	–	0
$ – Conference champion

The 1955 Denver Pioneers football team represented the University of Denver as a member of the Skyline Conference during the 1955 college football season. In their first season under head coach John Roning, the Pioneers compiled an 8–2 record (5–2 against conference opponents), tied for third in the Skyline, and outscored opponents by a total of 310 to 89.

=== Schedule ===
Date	Opponent	Site	Result	Attendance	Source
September 17	at Iowa State*	Clyde Williams Field; Ames, IA	W 19–7	12,217–14,000	
September 23	Drake*	Hilltop Stadium; Denver, CO	W 33–7	21,500	
October 1	at Colorado A&M*	Colorado Field; Fort Collins, CO	L 19–20	10,233	
October 8	at Montana	Dornblaser Field; Missoula, MT	W 61–13	9,000–10,000	
October 14	Utah	Hilltop Stadium; Denver, CO	L 7–27	22,000	
October 21	BYU	Hilltop Stadium; Denver, CO	W 33–0	8,000	
October 29	at New Mexico	Zimmerman Field; Albuquerque, NM	W 33–6	10,200	
November 5	Colorado College*	Hilltop Stadium; Denver, CO	W 60–0		
November 12	Utah State^{†}	Hilltop Stadium; Denver, CO	W 39–6	9,000–9,020	
November 24	Wyoming	Hilltop Stadium; Denver, CO	W 6–3	25,000	
*Non-conference game; ^{†}Homecoming

== 1956 ==
1956 Denver Pioneers football
- Conference: Skyline Conference
- Record: 6–4 (4–3 Skyline)
- Head coach: John Roning (2nd season)
- Home stadium: DU Stadium

1956 Skyline Conference football standings
	Conf.					Overall
Team	W		L		T	W		L		T
Wyoming	7	–	0	–	0	10	–	0	–	0
Utah	5	–	1	–	0	5	–	5	–	0
Denver	4	–	3	–	0	6	–	4	–	0
Utah State	4	–	3	–	0	6	–	4	–	0
Colorado A&M	2	–	4	–	1	2	–	7	–	1
New Mexico	2	–	4	–	0	4	–	6	–	0
BYU	1	–	5	–	1	2	–	7	–	1
Montana	1	–	6	–	0	1	–	9	–	0
$ – Conference champion

The 1956 Denver Pioneers football team represented the University of Denver as a member of the Skyline Conference during the 1956 college football season. In their second season under head coach John Roning, the Pioneers compiled a 6–4 record (4–3 against conference opponents), tied for third in the Skyline, and outscored opponents by a total of 250 to 206.

=== Schedule ===
Date	Opponent	Site	Result	Attendance	Source
September 15	Iowa State*	DU Stadium; Denver, CO	L 10–13	14,126	
September 22	at Utah State	Romney Stadium; Logan, UT	L 13–18	9,000	
September 29	at Wyoming	War Memorial Stadium; Laramie, WY	L 0–27	16,869	
October 5	Montana	DU Stadium; Denver, CO	W 22–13	11,560–11,561	
October 13	at Utah	Ute Stadium; Salt Lake City, UT	L 13–27	17,849	
October 19	Colorado College*	DU Stadium; Denver, CO	W 40–21	3,921	
October 26	New Mexico	DU Stadium; Denver, CO	W 20–14	9,183	
November 3	at San Jose State*	Spartan Stadium; San Jose, CA	W 35–26	12,000	
November 10	BYU^{†}	DU Stadium; Denver, CO	W 58–34	10,000–10,069	
November 22	Colorado A&M	DU Stadium; Denver, CO	W 39–13	13,128	
*Non-conference game; ^{†}Homecoming

== 1957 ==
1957 Denver Pioneers football
- Conference: Skyline Conference
- Record: 6–4 (5–2 Skyline)
- Head coach: John Roning (3rd season)
- Home stadium: DU Stadium

1957 Skyline Conference football standings
	Conf.					Overall
Team	W		L		T	W		L		T
Utah $	5	–	1	–	0	6	–	4	–	0
BYU	5	–	1	–	1	5	–	3	–	2
Denver	5	–	2	–	0	6	–	4	–	0
Wyoming	3	–	2	–	2	4	–	3	–	3
New Mexico	2	–	4	–	0	4	–	6	–	0
Colorado State	2	–	5	–	0	3	–	7	–	0
Montana	2	–	5	–	0	2	–	7	–	0
Utah State	1	–	5	–	1	2	–	7	–	1
$ – Conference champion

The 1957 Denver Pioneers football team represented the University of Denver as a member of the Skyline Conference during the 1957 college football season. In their third season under head coach John Roning, the Pioneers compiled a 6–4 record (5–2 against conference opponents), finished third in the Skyline, and were outscored by a total of 155 to 150.

=== Schedule ===
Date	Time	Opponent	Site	Result	Attendance	Source
September 21		at Iowa State*	Clyde Williams Field; Ames, IA	L 0–10	12,385	
September 27		San Jose State*	DU Stadium; Denver, CO	L 20–27	13,287	
October 5		at Colorado State	Colorado Field; Fort Collins, CO	L 6–27	6,434	
October 12	1:30 p.m.	at Montana	Dornblaser Field; Missoula, MT	W 26–13	8,000	
October 19		Utah^{†}	DU Stadium; Denver, CO	W 12–7	7,000–7,062	
October 26		at BYU	Cougar Stadium; Provo, UT	L 6–25	11,017	
November 2		at New Mexico	Zimmerman Field; Albuquerque, NM	W 19–0	14,000	
November 9		Air Force*	DU Stadium; Denver, CO	W 26–14	13,560	
November 16		Utah State	DU Stadium; Denver, CO	W 21–19	3,680–4,400	
November 28		Wyoming	DU Stadium; Denver, CO	W 14–13	16,000–16,084	
*Non-conference game; ^{†}Homecoming; All times are in Mountain time

== 1958 ==
1958 Denver Pioneers football
- Conference: Skyline Conference
- Record: 2–8 (2–5 Skyline)
- Head coach: John Roning (4th season)
- Home stadium: DU Stadium

1958 Skyline Conference football standings
	Conf.					Overall
Team	W		L		T	W		L		T
Wyoming $	6	–	1	–	0	8	–	3	–	0
New Mexico	5	–	1	–	0	7	–	3	–	0
BYU	5	–	2	–	0	6	–	4	–	0
Colorado State	4	–	3	–	0	6	–	4	–	0
Utah	3	–	3	–	0	4	–	7	–	0
Utah State	2	–	5	–	0	3	–	7	–	0
Denver	2	–	5	–	0	2	–	8	–	0
Montana	0	–	7	–	0	0	–	10	–	0
$ – Conference champion

The 1958 Denver Pioneers football team represented the University of Denver as a member of the Skyline Conference during the 1958 college football season. In their fourth season under head coach John Roning, the Pioneers compiled a 2–8 record (2–5 against conference opponents), tied for sixth place in the Skyline, and were outscored by a total of 163 to 135.

=== Schedule ===
Date	Opponent	Site	Result	Attendance	Source
September 20	Oklahoma State*	DU Stadium; Denver, CO	L 14–31	14,007–15,000	
September 26	at Utah State	Romney Stadium; Logan, UT	W 20–8	6,209–7,100	
October 4	at Wyoming	War Memorial Stadium; Laramie, WY	L 12–15	15,680	
October 10	Montana	DU Stadium; Denver, CO	W 29–0	7,944	
October 18	at Utah	Ute Stadium; Salt Lake City, UT	L 16–20		
October 25	at San Jose State*	Spartan Stadium; San Jose, CA	L 7–27	13,000	
October 31	New Mexico	DU Stadium; Denver, CO	L 15–21		
November 8	No. 10 Air Force*	DU Stadium; Denver, CO	L 7–10	18,047	
November 15	BYU	DU Stadium; Denver, CO	L 7–22	8,073	
November 27	Colorado State	DU Stadium; Denver, CO	L 8–9	4,130	
*Non-conference game; Rankings from AP Poll released prior to the game

== 1959 ==
1959 Denver Pioneers football
- Conference: Skyline Conference
- Record: 2–8 (2–5 Skyline)
- Head coach: John Roning (5th season)
- Home stadium: DU Stadium

1959 Skyline Conference football standings
	Conf.					Overall
Team	W		L		T	W		L		T
No. 16 Wyoming $	7	–	0	–	0	9	–	1	–	0
Colorado State	5	–	2	–	0	6	–	4	–	0
New Mexico	4	–	2	–	0	7	–	3	–	0
Utah	3	–	2	–	0	5	–	5	–	0
Utah State	2	–	5	–	0	5	–	6	–	0
BYU	2	–	5	–	0	3	–	7	–	0
Denver	2	–	5	–	0	2	–	8	–	0
Montana	1	–	5	–	0	1	–	8	–	0
$ – Conference champion; Rankings from AP Poll

The 1959 Denver Pioneers football team represented the University of Denver as a member of the Skyline Conference during the 1959 college football season. In their fifth season under head coach John Roning, the Pioneers compiled a 2–8 record (2–5 against conference opponents), tied for fifth place in the Skyline, and were outscored by a total of 230 to 104.

=== Schedule ===
Date	Opponent	Site	Result	Attendance	Source
September 18	San Jose State*	DU Stadium; Denver, CO	L 13–14	15,995–16,000	
September 25	Iowa State*	DU Stadium; Denver, CO	L 12–28	8,903–10,602	
October 3	at Colorado State	Colorado Field; Fort Collins, CO	L 0–15	9,100–9,101	
October 10	at Montana	Dornblaser Field; Missoula, MT	W 27–12	4,916–4,926	
October 16	Utah	DU Stadium; Denver, CO	L 12–26	6,184	
October 24	at BYU	Cougar Stadium; Provo, UT	W 14–7	9,305	
October 31	at New Mexico	Zimmerman Field; Albuquerque, NM	L 0–42		
November 7	at Oklahoma State*	Lewis Field; Stillwater, OK	L 12–20	15,000	
November 14	Utah State	DU Stadium; Denver, CO	L 14–21	7,265	
November 26	Wyoming	DU Stadium; Denver, CO	L 0–45	10,295	
*Non-conference game

== 1960 ==
1960 Denver Pioneers football
- Conference: Skyline Conference
- Record: 3–7 (1–6 Skyline)
- Head coach: John Roning (6th season)
- Home stadium: DU Stadium

1960 Skyline Conference football standings
	Conf.					Overall
Team	W		L		T	W		L		T
Utah State +	6	–	1	–	0	9	–	2	–	0
Wyoming +	6	–	1	–	0	8	–	2	–	0
Utah	5	–	1	–	0	7	–	3	–	0
New Mexico	4	–	2	–	0	5	–	5	–	0
Montana	2	–	5	–	0	5	–	5	–	0
BYU	2	–	5	–	0	3	–	8	–	0
Denver	1	–	6	–	0	3	–	7	–	0
Colorado State	1	–	6	–	0	2	–	8	–	0
+ – Conference co-champions

The 1960 Denver Pioneers football team represented the University of Denver in the Skyline Conference during the 1960 college football season. In their sixth season under head coach John Roning, the Pioneers compiled a 3–7 record (1–6 against Skyline opponents), tied for last place in the conference, and were outscored by a total of 300 to 133.

In January 1961, the University of Denver announced the cancellation of its football program. The program was operating at a net loss of $100,000 per year, and home attendance had dropped significantly.

=== Schedule ===
Date	Opponent	Site	Result	Attendance	Source
September 17	at Wichita*	Veterans Field; Wichita, KS	W 28–19	11,114	
September 23	Washington State*	DU Stadium; Denver, CO	W 28–26	19,504	
October 1	at Utah State	Romney Stadium; Logan, UT	L 8–31	8,300–8,663	
October 8	at Wyoming	War Memorial Stadium; Laramie, WY	L 2–41	12,030–12,039	
October 15	Montana	DU Stadium; Denver, CO	L 12–26	7,223	
October 22	at Utah	Ute Stadium; Salt Lake City, UT	L 16–49		
October 28	New Mexico	DU Stadium; Denver, CO	L 6–41	4,237	
November 5	vs. Air Force*	DU Stadium; Denver, CO	L 6–36	10,094	
November 12	BYU	DU Stadium; Denver, CO	L 6–19	3,775	
November 24	Colorado State	DU Stadium; Denver, CO	W 21–12	6,729–6,927	
*Non-conference game
