= 1954 New Mexico Lobos football team =

American college football season

1954 New Mexico Lobos football
- Conference: Skyline Conference
- Record: 5–5 (3–3 Skyline)
- Head coach: Bob Titchenal (2nd season)
- Home stadium: Zimmerman Field

1954 Skyline Conference football standings
	Conf.					Overall
Team	W		L		T	W		L		T
Denver $	6	–	1	–	0	9	–	1	–	0
Wyoming	5	–	1	–	0	6	–	4	–	0
Utah State	4	–	3	–	0	4	–	6	–	0
New Mexico	3	–	3	–	0	5	–	5	–	0
Utah	3	–	3	–	0	4	–	7	–	0
Colorado A&M	3	–	4	–	0	3	–	7	–	0
Montana	1	–	5	–	0	3	–	6	–	0
BYU	1	–	6	–	0	1	–	8	–	0
$ – Conference champion

The 1954 New Mexico Lobos football team represented the University of New Mexico in the Skyline Conference during the 1954 college football season. In their second season under head coach Bob Titchenal, the Lobos compiled a 5–5 record (3–3 against Skyline opponents), finished in a tie for fourth place in the conference, and were outscored by their opponents by a total of 168 to 152. Quarterback Jerry Lott led the team on offense.

== Schedule ==
Date	Opponent	Site	Result	Attendance	Source
September 18	at BYU	Cougar Stadium; Provo, UT	W 21–12	5,641	
September 25	at San Diego State*	Balboa Stadium; San Diego, CA	W 28–7	12,500	
October 2	Utah State	Zimmerman Field; Albuquerque, NM	L 0–6	11,500	
October 16	at Wyoming	War Memorial Stadium; Laramie, WY	L 7–9	7,642	
October 23	Arizona*	Zimmerman Field; Albuquerque, NM (rivalry)	L 7–41	11,000	
October 29	at Denver	DU Stadium; Denver, CO	L 6–19	10,968	
November 6	Montana^{†}	Zimmerman Field; Albuquerque, NM	W 20–14	11,000	
November 13	Colorado A&M	Zimmerman Field; Albuquerque, NM	W 10–7	7,500	
November 20	New Mexico A&M*	Zimmerman Field; Albuquerque, NM (rivalry)	W 39–27	5,500	
November 27	at San Jose State*	Spartan Stadium; San Jose, CA	L 14–26	9,000–10,000	
*Non-conference game; ^{†}Homecoming
