= 1951 Montana State Bobcats football team =

American college football season

1951 Montana State Bobcats football
- Conference: Rocky Mountain Conference
- Record: 0–7 (0–4 RMC)
- Head coach: John Mason (2nd season)
- Home stadium: Gatton Field

1951 Rocky Mountain Conference football standings
	Conf.					Overall
Team	W		L		T	W		L		T
Colorado Mines $	4	–	0	–	0	7	–	2	–	0
Colorado College	3	–	2	–	0	4	–	5	–	0
Idaho State	3	–	2	–	0	5	–	4	–	0
Colorado State–Greeley	2	–	3	–	0	4	–	3	–	0
Western State (CO)	2	–	3	–	0	3	–	5	–	0
Montana State	0	–	4	–	0	0	–	7	–	0
$ – Conference champion

The 1951 Montana State Bobcats football team was an American football team that represented Montana State University in the Rocky Mountain Conference (RMC) during the 1951 college football season. In its second and final season under head coach John Mason, the team compiled a 0–7 record.

== Schedule ==
Date	Opponent	Site	Result	Attendance	Source
September 15	at Utah*	Ute Stadium; Salt Lake City, UT	L 6–55	10,273	
September 22	at Eastern Washington*	Woodward Field; Cheney, WA	L 13–19		
September 29	at Colorado College	Washburn Field; Colorado Springs, CO	L 13–40		
October 6	Idaho State	Gatton Field; Bozeman, MT	L 6–19		
October 13	Colorado State–Greeley^{†}	Gatton Field; Bozeman, MT	L 0–24		
October 20	Montana*	Gatton Field; Bozeman, MT (rivalry)	L 0–38		
October 27	Western State (CO)	Gatton Field; Bozeman, MT	L 0–26		
*Non-conference game; ^{†}Homecoming
