= 1951 New Mexico A&M Aggies football team =

American college football season

1951 New Mexico A&M Aggies football
- Conference: Border Conference
- Record: 1–9 (1–4 Border)
- Head coach: Joseph T. Coleman (1st season)
- Home stadium: Memorial Stadium

1951 Border Conference football standings
	Conf.					Overall
Team	W		L		T	W		L		T
Texas Tech $	4	–	0	–	0	7	–	4	–	0
Arizona State	4	–	1	–	0	6	–	3	–	1
Hardin–Simmons	4	–	1	–	0	6	–	6	–	0
Arizona	3	–	3	–	0	6	–	5	–	0
Texas Western	2	–	4	–	0	3	–	7	–	0
New Mexico A&M	1	–	4	–	0	1	–	9	–	0
West Texas State	1	–	5	–	0	2	–	7	–	0
Arizona State–Flagstaff	0	–	1	–	0	1	–	7	–	0
$ – Conference champion

The 1951 New Mexico A&M Aggies football team was an American football team that represented New Mexico College of Agriculture and Mechanical Arts (now known as New Mexico State University) as a member of the Border Conference during the 1951 college football season In their first year under head coach Joseph T. Coleman, the Aggies compiled a 1–9 record (1–4 against conference opponents), finished sixth in the conference, and were outscored by a total of 337 to 115. The team played home games at Memorial Stadium in Las Cruces, New Mexico.

== Schedule ==
Date	Opponent	Site	Result	Attendance	Source
September 15	at Arizona	Arizona Stadium; Tucson, AZ	L 13–67	16,000	
September 22	Stephen F. Austin*	Memorial Stadium; Las Cruces, NM	L 7–27	5,000	
September 29	at Texas Western	Kidd Field; El Paso, TX (rivalry)	L 7–41	7,500	
October 6	New Mexico*	Memorial Stadium; Las Cruces, NM (rivalry)	L 0–20	6,200	
October 12	at Colorado Mines*	Alumni Field; Golden, CO	L 0–7		
October 20	at Bradley*	Peoria Stadium; Peoria, IL	L 6–34	4,500	
October 27	at Arizona State	Goodwin Stadium; Tempe, AZ	L 0–46		
November 3	Arizona State–Flagstaff	Memorial Stadium; Las Cruces, NM	W 48–12		
November 10	West Texas State	Memorial Stadium; Las Cruces, NM	L 20–50	2,000	
November 17	McMurry*	Memorial Stadium; Las Cruces, NM	L 14–33		
*Non-conference game
