= 1956 Colorado A&M Aggies football team =

American college football season

1956 Colorado A&M Aggies football
- Conference: Skyline Conference
- Record: 2–7–1 (2–4–1 Skyline)
- Head coach: Don Mullison (1st season)
- Home stadium: Colorado Field

1956 Skyline Conference football standings
	Conf.					Overall
Team	W		L		T	W		L		T
Wyoming	7	–	0	–	0	10	–	0	–	0
Utah	5	–	1	–	0	5	–	5	–	0
Denver	4	–	3	–	0	6	–	4	–	0
Utah State	4	–	3	–	0	6	–	4	–	0
Colorado A&M	2	–	4	–	1	2	–	7	–	1
New Mexico	2	–	4	–	0	4	–	6	–	0
BYU	1	–	5	–	1	2	–	7	–	1
Montana	1	–	6	–	0	1	–	9	–	0
$ – Conference champion

The 1956 Colorado A&M Aggies football team represented Colorado State College of Agriculture and Mechanic Arts in the Skyline Conference during the 1956 college football season. In their first season under head coach Don Mullison, the Aggies compiled a 2–7–1 record (2–4–1 against Skyline opponents), finished fifth in the Skyline Conference, and were outscored by opponents by a total of 314 to 156. On defense, the team gave up an average of 31.4 points per game, ranking 110 out of 111 major college teams in scoring defense.

Center Bob Weber received all-conference honors in 1956. The team's statistical leaders included Jerry Callahan with 342 passing yards, Wayne Walter with 471 rushing yards, and Ron McClary with 188 receiving yards.

== Schedule ==
Date	Opponent	Site	Result	Attendance	Source
September 22	at Pacific (CA)*	Pacific Memorial Stadium; Stockton, CA	L 14–39	5,000–18,006	
September 29	BYU	Colorado Field; Fort Collins, CO	T 0–0	6,740	
October 6	Wyoming	Colorado Field; Fort Collins, CO (rivalry)	L 12–20	11,138	
October 13	at Colorado*	Folsom Field; Boulder, CO (rivalry)	L 7–47	21,000	
October 20	at Utah State	Romney Stadium; Logan, UT	L 7–46	5,000	
October 27	Montana^{†}	Colorado Field; Fort Collins, CO	W 34–20	7,498	
November 3	at Xavier*	Corcoran Stadium; Cincinnati, OH	L 14–27	6,000	
November 10	Utah	Colorado Field; Fort Collins, CO	L 27–49	3,953	
November 22	at Denver	DU Stadium; Denver, CO	L 13–39	13,128	
December 1	at New Mexico	Zimmerman Field; Albuquerque, NM	W 28–27	9,500	
*Non-conference game; ^{†}Homecoming
