= Don Mullison =

American football player and coach (1924–2014)

Biographical details
- Born: July 4, 1924; Fort Morgan, Colorado, U.S.
- Died: September 14, 2013 (aged 89); Fort Collins, Colorado, U.S.

Playing career
- 1942: Colorado A&M
- 1946–1948: Colorado A&M
- Position: Guard

Coaching career (HC unless noted)
- 1952–1955: Colorado A&M (line)
- 1956–1961: Colorado A&M/State

Head coaching record
- Overall: 19–40–1

Accomplishments and honors

Awards
- Colorado State University Hall of Fame (1990)

Don "Tuffy" Mullison (July 4, 1924 – September 13, 2014) was an American college football coach. He served as the head football coach at Colorado State University from 1956 to 1961. Mullison played football for the Colorado A&M Aggies in 1942 before serving in the Pacific during World War II. He returned to Colorado A&M in 1946 playing until 1948 and was a member of Bob Davis' Raisin Bowl team. A champion wrestler also, Mullison returned to Colorado A&M as the assistant line coach in football in 1952. He helped Davis guide the 1955 Aggies to the Skyline Conference championship in 1955 before being named the head coach of football in 1956. He coached the football program until he was fired in December 1961.

== Head coaching record ==
| Year | Team | Overall | Conference | Standing |
|---|---|---|---|---|
Colorado A&M Aggies / Colorado State Rams (Skyline Conference) (1956–1961)
| 1956 | Colorado A&M | 2–7–1 | 2–4–1 | 5th |
| 1957 | Colorado State | 3–7 | 2–5 | T–6th |
| 1958 | Colorado State | 6–4 | 4–3 | 4th |
| 1959 | Colorado State | 6–4 | 5–2 | 2nd |
| 1960 | Colorado State | 2–8 | 1–6 | T–7th |
| 1961 | Colorado State | 0–10 | 0–6 | 7th |
| Colorado A&M: | | 19–40–1 | 14–26–1 | |
| Total: | | 19–40–1 | | |
