= 1959 Montana Grizzlies football team =

American college football season

1959 Montana Grizzlies football
- Conference: Skyline Conference
- Record: 1–8 (1–5 Skyline)
- Head coach: Ray Jenkins (2nd season)
- Home stadium: Dornblaser Field

1959 Skyline Conference football standings
	Conf.					Overall
Team	W		L		T	W		L		T
No. 16 Wyoming $	7	–	0	–	0	9	–	1	–	0
Colorado State	5	–	2	–	0	6	–	4	–	0
New Mexico	4	–	2	–	0	7	–	3	–	0
Utah	3	–	2	–	0	5	–	5	–	0
Utah State	2	–	5	–	0	5	–	6	–	0
BYU	2	–	5	–	0	3	–	7	–	0
Denver	2	–	5	–	0	2	–	8	–	0
Montana	1	–	5	–	0	1	–	8	–	0
$ – Conference champion; Rankings from AP Poll

The 1959 Montana Grizzlies football team represented the University of Montana in the 1959 college football season as a member of the Skyline Conference (Skyline). The Grizzlies were led by second-year head coach Ray Jenkins, played their home games at Dornblaser Field and finished the season with a record of one win and eight losses (1–8, 1–5 Skyline).

== Schedule ==
Date	Opponent	Site	Result	Attendance	Source
September 12	North Dakota*	Dornblaser Field; Missoula, MT	L 19–27	3,800	
September 19	vs. Wyoming	Daylis Stadium; Billings, MT (Midland Roundtable Grid Classic)	L 0–58	7,400	
October 3	at BYU	Cougar Stadium; Provo, UT	W 12–0		
October 10	Denver	Dornblaser Field; Missoula, MT	L 12–27	4,916–4,926	
October 17	at Utah State	Romney Stadium; Logan, UT	L 0–28	3,400	
October 24	New Mexico	Dornblaser Field; Missoula, MT	L 14–55	3,700	
October 31	Colorado State^{†}	Dornblaser Field; Missoula, MT	L 16–26	5,000	
November 7	at No. 15 Montana State*	Gatton Field; Bozeman, MT (rivalry)	L 6–40	7,963	
November 21	at Idaho*	Neale Stadium; Moscow, ID (Little Brown Stein)	L 6–9	4,000	
*Non-conference game; ^{†}Homecoming; Rankings from UPI Poll released prior to the game
