= 1959 Wyoming Cowboys football team =

American college football season

1959 Wyoming Cowboys football

Skyline champion
- Conference: Skyline Conference

Ranking
- AP: No. 16
- Record: 9–1 (7–0 Skyline)
- Head coach: Bob Devaney (3rd season)
- Captain: Len Kuczewski
- Home stadium: War Memorial Stadium

1959 Skyline Conference football standings
	Conf.					Overall
Team	W		L		T	W		L		T
No. 16 Wyoming $	7	–	0	–	0	9	–	1	–	0
Colorado State	5	–	2	–	0	6	–	4	–	0
New Mexico	4	–	2	–	0	7	–	3	–	0
Utah	3	–	2	–	0	5	–	5	–	0
Utah State	2	–	5	–	0	5	–	6	–	0
BYU	2	–	5	–	0	3	–	7	–	0
Denver	2	–	5	–	0	2	–	8	–	0
Montana	1	–	5	–	0	1	–	8	–	0
$ – Conference champion; Rankings from AP Poll

The 1959 Wyoming Cowboys football team was an American football team that represented the University of Wyoming as a member of the Skyline Conference during the 1959 college football season. In their third season under head coach Bob Devaney, the Cowboys compiled a 9–1 record (7–0 against Skyline opponents), won the Skyline Conference championship, and outscored opponents by a total of 287 to 62. The Cowboys were not ranked during the season, but after the season concluded they were ranked No. 16 in the final AP Poll.

The Cowboys ranked fourth out of 112 teams in major college football in scoring offense with an average of 28.7 points per game. They also ranked fifth in scoring defense, allowing an average of 6.2 points per game.

The team's statistical leaders included Jim Walden with 882 passing yards, Jerry Hill with 579 rushing yards and 50 points scored, and Dick Hamilton with 245 receiving yards. Jim Walden went on to play in the Canadian Football League for the BC Lions, Calgary Stampeders, and Edmonton Eskimos. Jerry Hill played 10 seasons in the National Football League with the Baltimore Colts.

Two players were named to the 1959 All-Skyline Conference team: guard Len Kuczewski; and quarterback Jim Walden.

== Schedule ==
Date	Opponent	Site	Result	Attendance	Source
September 19	vs. Montana	Daylis Stadium; Billings, MT (Midland Roundtable Grid Classic)	W 58–0	7,400	
September 26	Air Force*	War Memorial Stadium; Laramie, WY	L 7–20	20,527	
October 3	Utah State	War Memorial Stadium; Laramie, WY (rivalry)	W 27–2	9,685	
October 10	Colorado State	War Memorial Stadium; Laramie, WY (rivalry)	W 29–0	12,824	
October 17	BYU	War Memorial Stadium; Laramie, WY	W 21–6	12,723	
October 24	at Utah	Ute Stadium; Salt Lake City, UT	W 21–7	24,739	
October 31	at NC State*	Riddick Stadium; Raleigh, NC	W 26–0	13,500	
November 7	at San Jose State*	Spartan Stadium; San Jose, CA	W 28–7	17,000	
November 14	at New Mexico	Zimmerman Field; Albuquerque, NM	W 25–20	16,000	
November 26	at Denver	DU Stadium; Denver, CO	W 45–0	10,295	
*Non-conference game
