= 1954 Montana Grizzlies football team =

American college football season

1954 Montana Grizzlies football
- Conference: Skyline Conference
- Record: 3–6 (1–5 Skyline)
- Head coach: Ed Chinske (3rd season)
- Home stadium: Dornblaser Field

1954 Skyline Conference football standings
	Conf.					Overall
Team	W		L		T	W		L		T
Denver $	6	–	1	–	0	9	–	1	–	0
Wyoming	5	–	1	–	0	6	–	4	–	0
Utah State	4	–	3	–	0	4	–	6	–	0
New Mexico	3	–	3	–	0	5	–	5	–	0
Utah	3	–	3	–	0	4	–	7	–	0
Colorado A&M	3	–	4	–	0	3	–	7	–	0
Montana	1	–	5	–	0	3	–	6	–	0
BYU	1	–	6	–	0	1	–	8	–	0
$ – Conference champion

The 1954 Montana Grizzlies football team represented the University of Montana in the 1954 college football season as a member of the Skyline Conference. The Grizzlies were led by third-year head coach Ed Chinske, played their home games at Dornblaser Field and finished the season with a record of three wins and six losses (3–6, 1–5 MSC).

== Schedule ==
Date	Opponent	Site	Result	Attendance	Source
September 17	Fort Lewis*	Dornblaser Field; Missoula, MT	W 31–7	6,000	
October 2	at Iowa*	Kinnick Stadium; Iowa City, IA	L 6–48	37,590	
October 8	at Denver	DU Stadium; Denver, CO	L 13–19	12,426–12,436	
October 16	Utah State^{†}	Dornblaser Field; Missoula, MT	W 20–13	9,500	
October 23	at BYU	Cougar Stadium; Provo, UT	L 7–19	7,197	
October 30	at Colorado A&M	Colorado Field; Fort Collins, CO	L 34–37	2,477	
November 6	at New Mexico	Zimmerman Field; Albuquerque, NM	L 14–20	11,000	
November 13	Montana State*	Dornblaser Field; Missoula, MT (rivalry)	W 25–21	8,200	
November 20	Utah	Dornblaser Field; Missoula, MT	L 20–41	5,500	
*Non-conference game; ^{†}Homecoming
