= 1951 BYU Cougars football team =

American college football season

1951 BYU Cougars football
- Conference: Skyline Conference
- Record: 6–3–1 (2–3–1 Skyline Six)
- Head coach: Chick Atkinson (3rd season)
- Captain: Ray Oliverson
- Home stadium: Cougar Stadium

1951 Skyline Conference football standings
	Conf.					Overall
Team	W		L		T	W		L		T
Utah $	4	–	1	–	0	7	–	4	–	0
Wyoming	5	–	1	–	1	7	–	2	–	1
Denver	4	–	3	–	0	6	–	4	–	0
Colorado A&M	3	–	3	–	1	5	–	4	–	1
BYU	2	–	3	–	1	6	–	3	–	1
Utah State	2	–	4	–	1	3	–	5	–	1
New Mexico	2	–	4	–	0	4	–	7	–	0
Montana	1	–	4	–	0	2	–	7	–	0
$ – Conference champion

The 1951 BYU Cougars football team was an American football team that represented Brigham Young University as a member of the Skyline Conference during the 1951 college football season. In their third season under head coach Chick Atkinson, the Cougars compiled an overall record of 6–3–1 with a mark of 2–3–1 against conference opponents, finished fifth in the Skyline, and outscored opponents by a total of 215 to 184.

Ray Oliverson was the team captain. He was also selected as a first-team halfback on the 1951 All-Skyline Conference team selected by the Associated Press (AP). BYU's Jae Ballif also won first-team honors on the AP all-conference team as a defensive halfback.

== Schedule ==
Date	Opponent	Site	Result	Attendance	Source
September 14	Idaho State*	Cougar Stadium; Provo, UT	W 27–7	5,000	
September 22	Western State (CO)*	Cougar Stadium; Provo, UT	W 67–7	5,000	
September 29	Hawaii*	Cougar Stadium; Provo, UT	W 20–7	8,000–8,500	
October 6	at Utah	Ute Stadium; Salt Lake City, UT (rivalry)	L 6–7	21,459	
October 20	Wyoming	Cougar Stadium; Provo, UT	T 20–20	7,858	
October 27	at Denver	Hilltop Stadium; Denver, CO	L 6–56	12,359	
November 3	Colorado A&M^{†}	Cougar Stadium; Provo, UT	W 21–19	8,500	
November 10	Utah State	Cougar Stadium; Provo, UT (rivalry)	W 28–27	10,000	
November 17	at New Mexico	Zimmerman Field; Albuquerque, NM	L 0–34	8,500	
November 24	at Pepperdine*	El Camino Stadium; Torrance, CA	W 20–0		
*Non-conference game; ^{†}Homecoming
