= 1956 Utah State Aggies football team =

American college football season

1956 Utah State Aggies football
- Conference: Skyline Conference
- Record: 6–4 (4–3 Skyline)
- Head coach: Ev Faunce (2nd season)
- Home stadium: Romney Stadium

1956 Skyline Conference football standings
	Conf.					Overall
Team	W		L		T	W		L		T
Wyoming	7	–	0	–	0	10	–	0	–	0
Utah	5	–	1	–	0	5	–	5	–	0
Denver	4	–	3	–	0	6	–	4	–	0
Utah State	4	–	3	–	0	6	–	4	–	0
Colorado A&M	2	–	4	–	1	2	–	7	–	1
New Mexico	2	–	4	–	0	4	–	6	–	0
BYU	1	–	5	–	1	2	–	7	–	1
Montana	1	–	6	–	0	1	–	9	–	0
$ – Conference champion

The 1956 Utah State Aggies football team was an American football team that represented Utah State University in the Skyline Conference during the 1956 college football season. In their second season under head coach Ev Faunce, the Aggies compiled a 6–4 record (4–3 against Skyline opponents), tied for third place in the Skyline Conference, and outscored opponents by a total of 221 to 199.

== Schedule ==
Date	Opponent	Site	Result	Attendance	Source
September 15	at Drake*	Drake Stadium; Des Moines, IA	W 39–33	13,000	
September 22	Denver	Romney Stadium; Logan, UT	W 18–13	9,000	
September 29	at New Mexico	Zimmerman Field; Albuquerque, NM	L 19–27	12,000	
October 6	at Arizona*	Arizona Stadium; Tucson, AZ	W 12–7	20,500	
October 13	at Montana	Dornblaser Field; Missoula, MT	W 27–13	7,500	
October 20	Colorado A&M	Romney Stadium; Logan, UT	W 46–7	5,000	
October 27	BYU	Romney Stadium; Logan, UT (rivalry)	W 33–7	10,000	
November 3	Wyoming	Romney Stadium; Logan, UT (rivalry)	L 0–21	9,000	
November 10	vs. Idaho*	Bronco Stadium; Boise, ID	L 20–42	8,000	
November 22	at Utah	Ute Stadium; Salt Lake City, UT (rivalry)	L 7–29	18,169	
*Non-conference game
