= Tally Stevens =

American football player and coach (1923–1995)

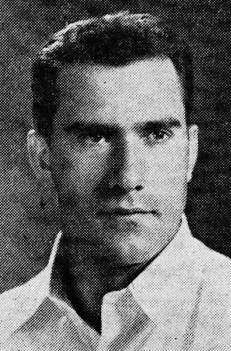
- Stevens, circa 1948

Biographical details
- Born: October 30, 1923; Oakley, Utah, U.S.
- Died: August 9, 1995 (aged 71); Salt Lake City, Utah, U.S.

Playing career
- 1942: Utah
- Position: End

Coaching career (HC unless noted)
- 1949: Morgan HS (UT)
- 1950–1955: East HS (UT)
- 1956–1958: BYU (assistant)
- 1959–1960: BYU

Head coaching record
- Overall: 6–15 (college)

Floyd Clair "Tally" Stevens (October 30, 1923 – August 9, 1995) was an American football player and coach. He served as the head football coach at Brigham Young University (BYU) from 1959 to 1960, compiling a record of 6–15. Steven played college football at the University of Utah as an end. He died on August 9, 1995.

Stevens interrupted his college football career to serve in the United States Army Air Forces during World War II. He was an assistant coach with BYU for three years before he became head coach for two.

== Head coaching record ==
=== College ===
Year	Team	Overall	Conference	Standing	Bowl/playoffs
BYU Cougars (Skyline Conference) (1959–1960)
1959	BYU	3–7	2–5	T–5th	
1960	BYU	3–8	2–5	T–5th	
BYU:		6–15	4–10		
Total:		6–15			
