= 1951 Montana Grizzlies football team =

American college football season

1951 Montana Grizzlies football
- Conference: Skyline Conference
- Record: 2–7 (1–4 Skyline)
- Head coach: Ted Shipkey (3rd season)
- Home stadium: Dornblaser Field

1951 Skyline Conference football standings
	Conf.					Overall
Team	W		L		T	W		L		T
Utah $	4	–	1	–	0	7	–	4	–	0
Wyoming	5	–	1	–	1	7	–	2	–	1
Denver	4	–	3	–	0	6	–	4	–	0
Colorado A&M	3	–	3	–	1	5	–	4	–	1
BYU	2	–	3	–	1	6	–	3	–	1
Utah State	2	–	4	–	1	3	–	5	–	1
New Mexico	2	–	4	–	0	4	–	7	–	0
Montana	1	–	4	–	0	2	–	7	–	0
$ – Conference champion

The 1951 Montana Grizzlies football team represented the University of Montana in the 1951 college football season as a member of the Skyline Conference. The Grizzlies were led by third-year head coach Ted Shipkey, played their home games on campus at Dornblaser Field in Missoula, and finished with a record of two wins and seven losses (2–7, 1–4 MSC).

== Schedule ==
Date	Opponent	Site	Result	Attendance	Source
September 22	at No. 8 Washington*	Husky Stadium; Seattle, WA	L 7–58	33,000–36,987	
September 29	New Mexico	Dornblaser Field; Missoula, MT	W 25–7		
October 6	at Denver	Hilltop Stadium; Denver, CO	L 0–55		
October 13	Idaho*^{†}	Dornblaser Field; Missoula, MT (Little Brown Stein)	L 9–12	9,000	
October 20	at Montana State*	Gatton Field; Bozeman, MT (rivalry)	W 38–0		
October 27	at Utah State	Romney Stadium; Logan, UT	L 6–19	6,000	
November 3	Wyoming	Dornblaser Field; Missoula, MT	L 7–34		
November 10	at Colorado A&M	Colorado Field; Fort Collins, CO	L 6–34	5,800	
November 17	at No. 17 Washington State*	Rogers Field; Pullman, WA	L 10–47	4,000	
*Non-conference game; ^{†}Homecoming; Rankings from AP Poll released prior to the game
