= 1957 Utah Utes football team =

American college football season

1957 Utah Utes football

Skyline champion
- Conference: Skyline Conference
- Record: 6–4 (5–1 Skyline)
- Head coach: Jack Curtice (8th season)
- Home stadium: Ute Stadium

1957 Skyline Conference football standings
	Conf.					Overall
Team	W		L		T	W		L		T
Utah $	5	–	1	–	0	6	–	4	–	0
BYU	5	–	1	–	1	5	–	3	–	2
Denver	5	–	2	–	0	6	–	4	–	0
Wyoming	3	–	2	–	2	4	–	3	–	3
New Mexico	2	–	4	–	0	4	–	6	–	0
Colorado State	2	–	5	–	0	3	–	7	–	0
Montana	2	–	5	–	0	2	–	7	–	0
Utah State	1	–	5	–	1	2	–	7	–	1
$ – Conference champion

The 1957 Utah Utes football team, or also commonly known as the Utah Redskins, was an American football team that represented the University of Utah as a member of the Skyline Conference during the 1957 college football season. In their eighth and final season under head coach Jack Curtice, the Utes compiled an overall record of 6–4 with a mark of 5–1 against conference opponents, winning the Skyline title. Home games were played on campus at Ute Stadium in Salt Lake City.

Curtice ran a wide-open offense. The Redskins were led on the field by transfer quarterback Lee Grosscup, who finished tenth in the balloting for the Heisman Trophy as a junior and was a second-team AP and UPI All-American. Sophomore Larry Wilson played safety and halfback and was later inducted into the Pro Football Hall of Fame after a career in the National Football League (NFL) with the St. Louis Cardinals.

After the season, Curtice left for Stanford University and was succeeded by Ray Nagel, the backfield coach at the University of California, Los Angeles (UCLA).

== Schedule ==
Date	Time	Opponent	Site	Result	Attendance	Source
September 21	8:00 p.m.	Montana	Ute Stadium; Salt Lake City, UT	W 32–13	16,179	
September 28		at Colorado*	Folsom Field; Boulder, CO (rivalry)	L 24–30	37,000	
October 5		vs. Idaho*	Bronco Stadium; Boise, ID	L 6–21	9,000	
October 12		BYU	Ute Stadium; Salt Lake City, UT (rivalry)	W 27–0	26,175	
October 19		at Denver	DU Stadium; Denver, CO	L 7–12	7,000–7,062	
October 26		Wyoming	Ute Stadium; Salt Lake City, UT	W 23–15	20,096	
November 3		Colorado State^{†}	Ute Stadium; Salt Lake City, UT	W 55–0	7,051	
November 9		at No. 8 Army*	Michie Stadium; West Point, NY	L 33–39	25,500–27,900	
November 16	2:00 p.m.	Air Force*	Ute Stadium; Salt Lake City, UT	W 34–0	11,440	
November 28		Utah State	Ute Stadium; Salt Lake City, UT (rivalry)	W 21–6	17,300	
*Non-conference game; ^{†}Homecoming; Rankings from AP Poll released prior to the game; All times are in Mountain time

== Personnel ==
- QB Lee Grosscup, Jr.

== NFL draft ==
Utah had three players selected in the 1958 NFL draft.

Player	Position	Round	Pick	NFL team
Merrill Douglas	Fullback	6	65	Chicago Bears
Everett Jones	Guard	21	247	Pittsburgh Steelers
Larry Fields	Back	23	275	San Francisco 49ers
