= 1957 Montana Grizzlies football team =

American college football season

1957 Montana Grizzlies football
- Conference: Skyline Conference
- Record: 2–7 (2–5 Skyline)
- Head coach: Jerry Williams (3rd season)
- Home stadium: Dornblaser Field

1957 Skyline Conference football standings
	Conf.					Overall
Team	W		L		T	W		L		T
Utah $	5	–	1	–	0	6	–	4	–	0
BYU	5	–	1	–	1	5	–	3	–	2
Denver	5	–	2	–	0	6	–	4	–	0
Wyoming	3	–	2	–	2	4	–	3	–	3
New Mexico	2	–	4	–	0	4	–	6	–	0
Colorado State	2	–	5	–	0	3	–	7	–	0
Montana	2	–	5	–	0	2	–	7	–	0
Utah State	1	–	5	–	1	2	–	7	–	1
$ – Conference champion

The 1957 Montana Grizzlies football team represented the University of Montana in the 1957 college football season as a member of the Skyline Conference. The Grizzlies were led by third-year head coach Jerry Williams, played their home games on campus at Dornblaser Field, and finished the season with a record of two wins and seven losses (2–7, 2–5 Skyline, seventh).

== Schedule ==
Date	Time	Opponent	Site	Result	Attendance	Source
September 21	8:00 p.m.	at Utah	Ute Stadium; Salt Lake City, UT	L 13–32		
September 28		vs. Wyoming	Daylis Stadium; Billings, MT	L 0–20	8,000	
October 4	8:05 p.m.	at BYU	Cougar Stadium; Provo, UT	L 7–20	10,876	
October 12	1:30 p.m.	Denver^{†}	Dornblaser Field; Missoula, MT	L 13–26	8,000	
October 19	1:30 p.m.	at Utah State	Romney Stadium; Logan, UT	W 35–25	7,100	
October 26	1:30 p.m.	New Mexico	Dornblaser Field; Missoula, MT	W 21–6		
November 2	2:30 p.m.	at Idaho*	Neale Stadium; Moscow, ID (Little Brown Stein)	L 13–31	4,000	
November 9		at Montana State*	Gatton Field; Bozeman, MT (rivalry)	L 13–22		
November 16		Colorado State	Dornblaser Field; Missoula, MT	L 7–19	4,000	
*Non-conference game; ^{†}Homecoming; All times are in Mountain time
