= 1954 Utah State Aggies football team =

American college football season

1954 Utah State Aggies football
- Conference: Skyline Conference
- Record: 4–6 (4–3 Skyline)
- Head coach: John Roning (4th season)
- Home stadium: Romney Stadium

1954 Skyline Conference football standings
	Conf.					Overall
Team	W		L		T	W		L		T
Denver $	6	–	1	–	0	9	–	1	–	0
Wyoming	5	–	1	–	0	6	–	4	–	0
Utah State	4	–	3	–	0	4	–	6	–	0
New Mexico	3	–	3	–	0	5	–	5	–	0
Utah	3	–	3	–	0	4	–	7	–	0
Colorado A&M	3	–	4	–	0	3	–	7	–	0
Montana	1	–	5	–	0	3	–	6	–	0
BYU	1	–	6	–	0	1	–	8	–	0
$ – Conference champion

The 1954 Utah State Aggies football team was an American football team that represented Utah State University in the Skyline Conference during the 1954 college football season. In their fourth season under head coach John Roning, the Aggies compiled a 4–6 record (4–3 against Skyline opponents), placed third in the Skyline Conference, and were outscored by opponents by a total of 187 to 158.

== Schedule ==
Date	Opponent	Site	Result	Attendance	Source
September 18	at San Jose State*	Spartan Stadium; San Jose, CA	L 0–20	11,000–12,000	
September 25	at Wichita*	Veterans Field; Wichita, KS	L 7–32	10,600–11,000	
October 2	at New Mexico	Zimmerman Field; Albuquerque, NM	W 6–0	11,500	
October 9	at Fresno State*	Ratcliffe Stadium; Fresno, CA	L 13–23	7,204–9,000	
October 16	at Montana	Dornblaser Field; Missoula, MT	L 13–20	9,500	
October 23	Colorado A&M	Romney Stadium; Logan, UT	W 20–14		
October 30	BYU^{†}	Romney Stadium; Logan, UT (rivalry)	W 45–13	11,200	
November 6	Wyoming	Romney Stadium; Logan, UT (rivalry)	L 12–21		
November 13	Denver	Romney Stadium; Logan, UT	L 7–25	3,500	
November 25	at Utah	Ute Stadium; Salt Lake City, UT (rivalry)	W 35–19	17,347	
*Non-conference game; ^{†}Homecoming
