= 1954 Wyoming Cowboys football team =

American college football season

1954 Wyoming Cowboys football
- Conference: Skyline Conference
- Record: 6–4 (5–1 Skyline)
- Head coach: Phil Dickens (2nd season)
- Captain: Frank Radella
- Home stadium: War Memorial Stadium

1954 Skyline Conference football standings
	Conf.					Overall
Team	W		L		T	W		L		T
Denver $	6	–	1	–	0	9	–	1	–	0
Wyoming	5	–	1	–	0	6	–	4	–	0
Utah State	4	–	3	–	0	4	–	6	–	0
New Mexico	3	–	3	–	0	5	–	5	–	0
Utah	3	–	3	–	0	4	–	7	–	0
Colorado A&M	3	–	4	–	0	3	–	7	–	0
Montana	1	–	5	–	0	3	–	6	–	0
BYU	1	–	6	–	0	1	–	8	–	0
$ – Conference champion

The 1954 Wyoming Cowboys football team was an American football team that represented the University of Wyoming as a member of the Skyline Conference during the 1954 college football season. In their second season under head coach Phil Dickens, the Cowboys compiled a 6–4 record (5–1 against Skyline opponents), finished second in the conference, and outscored opponents by a total of 215 to 171.

== Schedule ==
Date	Opponent	Site	Result	Attendance	Source
September 18	Oklahoma A&M*	War Memorial Stadium; Laramie, WY	L 6–14	14,871	
September 25	Kansas State*	War Memorial Stadium; Laramie, WY	L 13–21	9,042	
October 2	Denver	War Memorial Stadium; Laramie, WY	W 23–21	10,202–10,500	
October 9	at Colorado A&M	Colorado Field; Fort Collins, CO (rivalry)	W 34–0	9,500	
October 16	New Mexico	War Memorial Stadium; Laramie, WY	W 9–7	7,642	
October 23	Utah	War Memorial Stadium; Laramie, WY	L 7–14	14,734	
November 6	at Utah State	Romney Stadium; Logan, UT (rivalry)	W 21–12		
November 13	at BYU	Cougar Stadium; Provo, UT	W 34–13	3,824	
November 20	at Tulsa*	Skelly Field; Tulsa, OK	W 28–27	7,000	
November 27	at Arizona*	Arizona Stadium; Tucson, AZ	L 40–42	12,000	
*Non-conference game
