= 1951 Hardin–Simmons Cowboys football team =

American college football season

1951 Hardin–Simmons Cowboys football
- Conference: Border Conference
- Record: 6–6 (4–1 Border)
- Head coach: Warren B. Woodson (8th season)
- Home stadium: Parramore Stadium

1951 Border Conference football standings
	Conf.					Overall
Team	W		L		T	W		L		T
Texas Tech $	4	–	0	–	0	7	–	4	–	0
Arizona State	4	–	1	–	0	6	–	3	–	1
Hardin–Simmons	4	–	1	–	0	6	–	6	–	0
Arizona	3	–	3	–	0	6	–	5	–	0
Texas Western	2	–	4	–	0	3	–	7	–	0
New Mexico A&M	1	–	4	–	0	1	–	9	–	0
West Texas State	1	–	5	–	0	2	–	7	–	0
Arizona State–Flagstaff	0	–	1	–	0	1	–	7	–	0
$ – Conference champion

The 1951 Hardin–Simmons Cowboys football team was an American football team that represented Hardin–Simmons University in the Border Conference during the 1951 college football season. In its eighth and final season under head coach Warren B. Woodson, the team compiled a 6–6 record (4–1 against conference opponents), tied for second place in the conference, and outscored opponents by a total of 272 to 216. The team was ranked at No. 78 in the 1951 Litkenhous Ratings.

Four Hardin-Simmons players were named to the 1951 All-Border Conference football team: end Bill Cagle; halfback Dunny Goode, quarterback Bob Hart, and offensive tackle Cush Holder.

== Schedule ==
Date	Time	Opponent	Site	Result	Attendance	Source
September 22		at Pacific (CA)*	Pacific Memorial Stadium; Stockton, CA	L 7–33	19,134	
September 29		at Trinity (TX)*	Alamo Stadium; San Antonio, TX	W 20–6		
October 6		at Midwestern (TX)*	Coyote Stadium; Wichita Falls, TX	W 32–21	13,500	
October 13		at Arizona State	Goodwin Stadium; Tempe, AZ	W 39–14		
October 20		at Houston*	Rice Stadium; Houston, TX	L 27–35	15,000	
October 27	2:30 p.m.	at West Texas State	Buffalo Stadium; Canyon, TX	W 27–6	6,000–7,000	
November 3		Cincinnati*	Fair Park Stadium; Abilene, TX	L 12–13	8,000	
November 9		Texas Western	Parramore Stadium; Abilene, TX	W 46–0		
November 17		at Loyola (CA)*	Rose Bowl; Pasadena, CA	L 13–14	9,500	
November 24		Arizona	Parramore Stadium; Abilene, TX	W 14–13	3,000	
December 1		at Texas Tech	Jones Stadium; Lubbock, TX	L 21–28	17,000	
December 8		at Tulsa*	Skelly Field; Tulsa, OK	L 14–33	5,282	
*Non-conference game; All times are in Central time
