= 1951 Texas Tech Red Raiders football team =

American college football season

1951 Texas Tech Red Raiders football

Border champion

Sun Bowl, W 25–14 vs. Pacific (CA)
- Conference: Border Conference
- Record: 7–4 (4–0 Border)
- Head coach: DeWitt Weaver (1st season)
- Offensive scheme: T formation
- Base defense: 5–3
- Home stadium: Jones Stadium

1951 Border Conference football standings
	Conf.					Overall
Team	W		L		T	W		L		T
Texas Tech $	4	–	0	–	0	7	–	4	–	0
Arizona State	4	–	1	–	0	6	–	3	–	1
Hardin–Simmons	4	–	1	–	0	6	–	6	–	0
Arizona	3	–	3	–	0	6	–	5	–	0
Texas Western	2	–	4	–	0	3	–	7	–	0
New Mexico A&M	1	–	4	–	0	1	–	9	–	0
West Texas State	1	–	5	–	0	2	–	7	–	0
Arizona State–Flagstaff	0	–	1	–	0	1	–	7	–	0
$ – Conference champion

The 1951 Texas Tech Red Raiders football team represented Texas Technological College—now known as Texas Tech University—as a member of the Border Conference during the 1951 college football season. Led by first-year head coach DeWitt Weaver, the Red Raiders compiled an overall record of 7–4 with a mark of 4–0 in conference play, winning the Border Conference title. Texas Tech was invited to the Sun Bowl, where they beat the Pacific Tigers.

== Schedule ==
Date	Opponent	Site	Result	Attendance	Source
September 22	West Texas State	Jones Stadium; Lubbock, TX	W 46–7	16,000	
September 29	vs. No. 6 Texas A&M*	Cotton Bowl; Dallas, TX (rivalry)	L 7–20	27,000	
October 6	at Houston*	Rice Stadium; Houston, TX (rivalry)	L 0–6	15,000–24,000	
October 13	TCU*	Jones Stadium; Lubbock, TX (rivalry)	W 33–19	19,000	
October 20	at No. 10 Baylor*	Baylor Stadium; Waco, TX (rivalry)	L 20–40	22,000	
October 27	Arizona^{†}	Jones Stadium; Lubbock, TX	W 41–0	16,000	
November 3	at Texas Western	Kidd Field; El Paso, TX	W 27–7	8,500	
November 17	at Tulsa*	Skelly Stadium; Tulsa, OK	L 14–21	9,984–12,000	
November 24	at New Mexico	Zimmerman Field; Albuquerque, NM	W 60–14		
December 1	Hardin–Simmons	Jones Stadium; Lubbock, TX	W 28–21	17,000	
January 1	vs. Pacific (CA)	Kidd Field; El Paso, TX (Sun Bowl)	W 25–14	17,000	
*Non-conference game; ^{†}Homecoming; Rankings from AP Poll released prior to the game
