= 1959 BYU Cougars football team =

American college football season

1959 BYU Cougars football
- Conference: Skyline Conference
- Record: 3–7 (2–5 Skyline Six)
- Head coach: Tally Stevens (1st season)
- Home stadium: Cougar Stadium

1959 Skyline Conference football standings
	Conf.					Overall
Team	W		L		T	W		L		T
No. 16 Wyoming $	7	–	0	–	0	9	–	1	–	0
Colorado State	5	–	2	–	0	6	–	4	–	0
New Mexico	4	–	2	–	0	7	–	3	–	0
Utah	3	–	2	–	0	5	–	5	–	0
Utah State	2	–	5	–	0	5	–	6	–	0
BYU	2	–	5	–	0	3	–	7	–	0
Denver	2	–	5	–	0	2	–	8	–	0
Montana	1	–	5	–	0	1	–	8	–	0
$ – Conference champion; Rankings from AP Poll

The 1959 BYU Cougars football team was an American football team that represented Brigham Young University (BYU) in the Skyline Conference during the 1959 college football season. In their first season under head coach Tally Stevens, the Cougars compiled an overall record of 3–7 with a mark of 2–5 against conference opponents, tied for fifth place in the Skyline, and were outscored by a total of 169 to 101.

The team's statistical leaders included Gary Dunn with 223 passing yards, LeGrand Young with 423 rushing yards and 423 yards of total offense, Jack Gifford with 32 points, and Howard Ringwood with 130 receiving yards.

== Schedule ==
Date	Opponent	Site	Result	Attendance	Source
September 19	at Arizona*	Arizona Stadium; Tucson, AZ	W 18–14	22,000	
September 26	at Fresno State*	Ratcliffe Stadium; Fresno, CA	L 16–27	8,234	
October 3	Montana	Cougar Stadium; Provo, UT	L 0–12		
October 9	at Utah	Ute Stadium; Salt Lake City, UT (rivalry)	L 8–20	17,121	
October 17	at Wyoming	War Memorial Stadium; Laramie, WY	L 6–21	12,723	
October 24	Denver^{†}	Cougar Stadium; Provo, UT	L 7–14	9,305	
October 31	Utah State	Cougar Stadium; Provo, UT (rivalry)	W 18–0	6,924	
November 7	at New Mexico	Zimmerman Field; Albuquerque, NM	L 6–21	10,000	
November 14	at Arizona State*	Sun Devil Stadium; Tempe, AZ	L 8–27	25,200	
November 21	Colorado State	Cougar Stadium; Provo, UT	W 14–13	5,310	
*Non-conference game; ^{†}Homecoming
