= 1957 Wyoming Cowboys football team =

American college football season

1957 Wyoming Cowboys football
- Conference: Skyline Conference
- Record: 4–3–3 (3–2–2 Skyline)
- Head coach: Bob Devaney (1st season)
- Captain: Greg Maushart
- Home stadium: War Memorial Stadium

1957 Skyline Conference football standings
	Conf.					Overall
Team	W		L		T	W		L		T
Utah $	5	–	1	–	0	6	–	4	–	0
BYU	5	–	1	–	1	5	–	3	–	2
Denver	5	–	2	–	0	6	–	4	–	0
Wyoming	3	–	2	–	2	4	–	3	–	3
New Mexico	2	–	4	–	0	4	–	6	–	0
Colorado State	2	–	5	–	0	3	–	7	–	0
Montana	2	–	5	–	0	2	–	7	–	0
Utah State	1	–	5	–	1	2	–	7	–	1
$ – Conference champion

The 1957 Wyoming Cowboys football team was an American football team that represented the University of Wyoming as a member of the Skyline Conference during the 1957 college football season. In their first season under head coach Bob Devaney, the Cowboys compiled a 4–3–3 record (3–2–2 against Skyline opponents), finished fourth in the Skyline Conference, and outscored opponents by a total of 139 to 135.

The 1957 season was Bob Devaney's first as a head coach. He was later inducted into the College Football Hall of Fame.

== Schedule ==
Date	Opponent	Site	Result	Attendance	Source
September 21	Kansas State*	War Memorial Stadium; Laramie, WY	W 12–7	12,733	
September 28	vs. Montana	Daylis Stadium; Billings, MT	W 20–0	8,000	
October 5	Utah State	War Memorial Stadium; Laramie, WY	T 19–19	7,300	
October 12	Colorado State	War Memorial Stadium; Laramie, WY (rivalry)	W 27–13	9,300	
October 19	BYU	War Memorial Stadium; Laramie, WY	T 0–0	9,018	
October 26	at Utah	Ute Stadium; Salt Lake City, UT	L 15–23	20,096	
November 2	Air Force*	War Memorial Stadium; Laramie, WY	T 7–7	7,600–7,678	
November 9	at Oklahoma State*	Lewis Field; Stillwater, OK	L 6–39	14,000	
November 16	at New Mexico	Zimmerman Field; Albuquerque, NM	W 20–13		
November 28	at Denver	DU Stadium; Denver, CO	L 13–14	16,000–16,084	
*Non-conference game
