= 1951 Texas Western Miners football team =

American college football season

1951 Texas Western Miners football
- Conference: Border Conference
- Record: 3–7 (2–4 Border)
- Head coach: Mike Brumbelow (2nd season)
- Home stadium: Kidd Field

1951 Border Conference football standings
	Conf.					Overall
Team	W		L		T	W		L		T
Texas Tech $	4	–	0	–	0	7	–	4	–	0
Arizona State	4	–	1	–	0	6	–	3	–	1
Hardin–Simmons	4	–	1	–	0	6	–	6	–	0
Arizona	3	–	3	–	0	6	–	5	–	0
Texas Western	2	–	4	–	0	3	–	7	–	0
New Mexico A&M	1	–	4	–	0	1	–	9	–	0
West Texas State	1	–	5	–	0	2	–	7	–	0
Arizona State–Flagstaff	0	–	1	–	0	1	–	7	–	0
$ – Conference champion

The 1951 Texas Western Miners football team was an American football team that represented Texas Western College (now known as University of Texas at El Paso) as a member of the Border Conference during the 1951 college football season. In its second season under head coach Mike Brumbelow, the team compiled a 3–7 record (2–4 against Border Conference opponents), finished fifth in the conference, and were outscored by a total of 241 to 152.

== Schedule ==
Date	Time	Opponent	Site	Result	Attendance	Source
September 22		North Texas State*	Kidd Field; El Paso, TX	L 0–33	11,000	
September 29		New Mexico A&M	Kidd Field; El Paso, TX (rivalry)	W 41–7	7,500	
October 6		vs. Abilene Christian*	Midland Memorial Stadium; Midland, TX	L 13–20	5,000	
October 13		at Arizona	Arizona Stadium; Tucson, AZ	L 15–19		
October 20		New Mexico*	Kidd Field; El Paso, TX	W 32–7		
October 27		at Cincinnati*	Nippert Stadium; Cincinnati, OH	L 18–53	16,000	
November 3		Texas Tech^{†}	Kidd Field; El Paso, TX	L 7–27	8,500	
November 9		at Hardin–Simmons	Parramore Stadium; Abilene, TX	L 0–46		
November 17		Arizona State	Kidd Field; El Paso, TX	L 13–23	5,000	
November 24	1:15 p.m.	at West Texas State	Amarillo Stadium; Amarillo, TX	W 13–6	400	
*Non-conference game; ^{†}Homecoming; All times are in Mountain time
