= 1957 Colorado State Rams football team =

American college football season

1957 Colorado State Rams football
- Conference: Skyline Conference
- Record: 3–7 (2–5 Skyline)
- Head coach: Don Mullison (2nd season)
- Home stadium: Colorado Field

1957 Skyline Conference football standings
	Conf.					Overall
Team	W		L		T	W		L		T
Utah $	5	–	1	–	0	6	–	4	–	0
BYU	5	–	1	–	1	5	–	3	–	2
Denver	5	–	2	–	0	6	–	4	–	0
Wyoming	3	–	2	–	2	4	–	3	–	3
New Mexico	2	–	4	–	0	4	–	6	–	0
Colorado State	2	–	5	–	0	3	–	7	–	0
Montana	2	–	5	–	0	2	–	7	–	0
Utah State	1	–	5	–	1	2	–	7	–	1
$ – Conference champion

The 1957 Colorado State Rams football team represented Colorado State University in the Skyline Conference during the 1957 college football season. In their second season under head coach Don Mullison, the Rams compiled a 3–7 record (2–5 against Skyline opponents), tied for sixth place in the Skyline Conference, and were outscored by opponents by a total of 224 to 109.

The team's statistical leaders included Louie Long with 328 passing yards and Frank Gupton with 540 rushing yards and 162 receiving yards.

== Schedule ==
Date	Opponent	Site	Result	Attendance	Source
September 28	New Mexico	Colorado Field; Fort Collins, CO	L 7–30	6,000	
October 5	Denver	Colorado Field; Fort Collins, CO	W 27–6		
October 12	at Wyoming	War Memorial Stadium; Laramie, WY (rivalry)	L 13–27	9,300	
October 19	at Bradley*	Peoria Stadium; Peoria, IL	L 0–19	7,500	
October 26	Utah State^{†}	Colorado Field; Fort Collins, CO	L 14–27	9,000	
November 3	at Utah	Ute Stadium; Salt Lake City, UT	L 0–55	7,051	
November 9	Colorado*	Colorado Field; Fort Collins, CO (rivalry)	L 0–20	7,000	
November 16	at Montana	Dornblaser Field; Missoula, MT	W 19–7	4,000	
November 23	at BYU	Cougar Stadium; Provo, UT	L 9–26	6,413	
November 30	at Air Force*	DU Stadium; Denver, CO (rivalry)	W 20–7	5,879	
*Non-conference game; ^{†}Homecoming
