= 1956 New Mexico Lobos football team =

American college football season

1956 New Mexico Lobos football
- Conference: Skyline Conference
- Record: 4–6 (2–4 Skyline)
- Head coach: Dick Clausen (1st season)
- Home stadium: Zimmerman Field

1956 Skyline Conference football standings
	Conf.					Overall
Team	W		L		T	W		L		T
Wyoming	7	–	0	–	0	10	–	0	–	0
Utah	5	–	1	–	0	5	–	5	–	0
Denver	4	–	3	–	0	6	–	4	–	0
Utah State	4	–	3	–	0	6	–	4	–	0
Colorado A&M	2	–	4	–	1	2	–	7	–	1
New Mexico	2	–	4	–	0	4	–	6	–	0
BYU	1	–	5	–	1	2	–	7	–	1
Montana	1	–	6	–	0	1	–	9	–	0
$ – Conference champion

The 1956 New Mexico Lobos football team represented the University of New Mexico in the Skyline Conference during the 1956 college football season. In their first season under head coach Dick Clausen, the Lobos compiled a 4–6 record (2–4 against Skyline opponents), finished in a tie for fifth in the conference, and were outscored by opponents by a total of 205 to 167.

On December 29, 1955, the university announced the hiring of Dick Clausen as the new head football coach. Clausen had been the head coach at Coe College in Cedar Rapids, Iowa, from 1948 to 1955.

== Schedule ==
Date	Opponent	Site	Result	Attendance	Source
September 22	at New Mexico A&M*	Memorial Stadium; Las Cruces, NM (rivalry)	W 14–6	7,000	
September 29	Utah State	Zimmerman Field; Albuquerque, NM	W 27–19	12,000	
October 6	at Texas Western*	Kidd Field; El Paso, TX	L 0–34		
October 13	at Wyoming	War Memorial Stadium; Laramie, WY	L 13–20	6,021	
October 20	Arizona*	Zimmerman Field; Albuquerque, NM (rivalry)	L 12–26	13,127	
October 26	at Denver	DU Stadium; Denver, CO	L 14–20	9,183	
November 3	at BYU	Cougar Stadium; Provo, UT	L 12–33	5,523	
November 17	Montana^{†}	Zimmerman Field; Albuquerque, NM	W 14–13		
November 24	San Diego State*	Zimmerman Field; Albuquerque, NM	W 34–6	6,000	
December 1	Colorado A&M	Zimmerman Field; Albuquerque, NM	L 27–28	9,500	
*Non-conference game; ^{†}Homecoming
