= 1957 New Mexico Lobos football team =

American college football season

1957 New Mexico Lobos football
- Conference: Skyline Conference
- Record: 4–6 (2–4 Skyline)
- Head coach: Dick Clausen (2nd season)
- Home stadium: Zimmerman Field

1957 Skyline Conference football standings
| | Conf. | | | | | Overall |
| Team | W | | L | | T | W | | L | | T |
|---|---|---|---|---|---|---|---|---|---|---|
| Utah $ | 5 | – | 1 | – | 0 | 6 | – | 4 | – | 0 |
| BYU | 5 | – | 1 | – | 1 | 5 | – | 3 | – | 2 |
| Denver | 5 | – | 2 | – | 0 | 6 | – | 4 | – | 0 |
| Wyoming | 3 | – | 2 | – | 2 | 4 | – | 3 | – | 3 |
| New Mexico | 2 | – | 4 | – | 0 | 4 | – | 6 | – | 0 |
| Colorado State | 2 | – | 5 | – | 0 | 3 | – | 7 | – | 0 |
| Montana | 2 | – | 5 | – | 0 | 2 | – | 7 | – | 0 |
| Utah State | 1 | – | 5 | – | 1 | 2 | – | 7 | – | 1 |
$ – Conference champion

The 1957 New Mexico Lobos football team represented the University of New Mexico in the Skyline Conference during the 1957 college football season. In their second and final season under head coach Dick Clausen, the Lobos compiled a 4–6 record (2–4 against Skyline opponents), finished fifth in the conference, and were outscored by opponents by a total of 144 to 140. The Lobos won four of five games to open the season, but closed the season with five consecutive losses.

The team's statistical leaders included Chuck Roberts with 305 passing yards and Don Perkins with 744 rushing yards and 162 receiving yards.

In May 1958, Dick Clausen retired as New Mexico's head football coach to become the athletic director at the University of Arizona. Clausen was immediately replaced by Marv Levy.

== Schedule ==
| Date | Opponent | Site | Result | Attendance | Source |
|---|---|---|---|---|---|
| September 21 | New Mexico A&M* | Zimmerman Field; Albuquerque, NM (rivalry) | W 25–7 | 12,000 | |
| September 28 | at Colorado State | Colorado Field; Fort Collins, CO | W 30–7 | 4,900 | |
| October 5 | Texas Western* | Zimmerman Field; Albuquerque, NM | L 13–15 | | |
| October 12 | at Utah State | Romney Stadium; Logan, UT | W 14–10 | 5,000 | |
| October 19 | at Arizona* | Arizona Stadium; Tucson, AZ (rivalry) | W 27–0 | 23,000 | |
| October 26 | at Montana | Dornblaser Field; Missoula, MT | L 6–21 | 4,200 | |
| November 2 | Denver^{†} | Zimmerman Field; Albuquerque, NM | L 0–19 | 14,000 | |
| November 16 | Wyoming | Zimmerman Field; Albuquerque, NM | L 13–20 | | |
| November 23 | at Air Force* | DU Stadium; Denver, CO | L 0–31 | 5,500 | |
| November 30 | BYU | Zimmerman Field; Albuquerque, NM | L 12–14 | 6,000 | |
*Non-conference game; ^{†}Homecoming
