= Fritz S. Brennecke =

American football player and coach (1911–1996)

Biographical details
- Born: August 28, 1911; Montana, U.S.
- Died: September 23, 1996 (aged 85)

Playing career
- 1932–1934: Colorado Agricultural

Coaching career (HC unless noted)
- 1936: Steamboat Springs HS (CO)
- 1937–1941: Golden HS (CO)
- 1942: Denver South HS (CO)
- 1946: Denver South HS (CO)
- 1947–1968: Colorado Mines

Head coaching record
- Overall: 78–113–8 (college)

Accomplishments and honors

Championships
- 2 RMC (1951, 1958)

Fritz S. Brennecke (August 28, 1911 – September 23, 1996) was an American football player and coach. He served as the head football coach at the Colorado School of Mines in Golden, Colorado from 1947 to 1968, compiling a record of 78–113–8. Brennecke played college football at Colorado Agricultural College (now known as Colorado State University) in Fort Collins, Colorado from 1932 to 1934. After graduating, he served as a high school football coach at several locations in Colorado.

== Head coaching record ==
=== College ===
Year	Team	Overall	Conference	Standing	Bowl/playoffs
Colorado Mines Orediggers (Rocky Mountain Athletic Conference) (1947–1968)
1947	Colorado Mines	1–7	1–2	4th	
1948	Colorado Mines	3–6	0–3	4th	
1949	Colorado Mines	4–4–1	2–1	2nd	
1950	Colorado Mines	4–6	0–4	6th	
1951	Colorado Mines	7–2	4–0	1st	
1952	Colorado Mines	4–5	2–3	4th	
1953	Colorado Mines	3–4–1	1–3–1	5th	
1954	Colorado Mines	4–5	4–4	T–3rd	
1955	Colorado Mines	2–5–2	2–4–2	4th	
1956	Colorado Mines	2–7	0–5	6th	
1957	Colorado Mines	0–6–3	0–3–2	5th	
1958	Colorado Mines	7–3	4–1	T–1st	
1959	Colorado Mines	4–6	1–3	6th	
1960	Colorado Mines	6–3	3–2	3rd	
1961	Colorado Mines	3–6	2–2	T–2nd	
1962	Colorado Mines	4–5	1–3	4th	
1963	Colorado Mines	6–3	1–3	4th	
1964	Colorado Mines	0–9	0–3	4th	
1965	Colorado Mines	4–5	0–3	4th	
1966	Colorado Mines	5–5	1–2	3rd	
1967	Colorado Mines	1–7–1	0–3	4th	
1968	Colorado Mines	4–4	0–2	4th	
Colorado Mines:		78–113–8	29–59–5		
Total:		78–113–8			
National championship Conference title Conference division title or championship game berth
