= List of NFL players (D) =

This is a list of players who have appeared in at least one regular season or postseason game in the National Football League (NFL), American Football League (AFL), or All-America Football Conference (AAFC) and have a last name that starts with "D". This list is accurate through the end of the 2025 NFL season.

== Daa–Dau ==
- Jerry Daanen
- Carlton Dabney
- Drake Dabney
- Carson Dach
- Weston Dacus
- Bill Daddio
- Dave D'Addio
- Harrie Dadmun
- Ted Daffer
- Bernard Dafney
- Dominique Dafney
- Fred DaGata
- Frank D'Agostino
- Lou D'Agostino
- Bob Dahl
- Craig Dahl
- Harvey Dahl
- Joe Dahl
- George Dahlgren
- Tom Dahms
- Anthony Daigle
- Casey Dailey
- Ted Dailey
- Dave Dalby
- Carroll Dale
- Jeffery Dale
- Roland Dale
- Bill Daley
- Dennis Daley
- Ken Dallafior
- DeeJay Dallas
- Dilly Dally
- Chris Dalman
- Drew Dalman
- Pete D'Alonzo
- Slats Dalrymple
- Andy Dalton
- Antico Dalton
- Jalen Dalton
- Lional Dalton
- Moxie Dalton
- Oakley Dalton
- Brad Daluiso
- Scott Daly
- Mike D'Amato
- Frank Damiani
- Maury Damkroger
- John Damore
- Boley Dancewicz
- Dick Danehe
- Joe Danelo
- Bill Danenhauer
- Eldon Danenhauer
- George Daney
- Jordan Dangerfield
- Chase Daniel
- Eugene Daniel
- Kenny Daniel
- Robertson Daniel
- Trevor Daniel
- Willie Daniel
- Ave Daniell
- Jim Daniell
- B. J. Daniels
- Calvin Daniels
- Clem Daniels
- Darrell Daniels
- Darrion Daniels
- Dave Daniels
- David Daniels
- Dexter Daniels
- Dick Daniels
- Jack Daniels
- James Daniels
- Jayden Daniels
- Jerome Daniels
- Kahzin Daniels
- LeShun Daniels (born 1974)
- LeShun Daniels (born 1995)
- Matt Daniels
- Mike Daniels
- Owen Daniels
- Phillip Daniels
- Stanley Daniels
- Torrance Daniels
- Travis Daniels
- Gary Danielson
- Ernie Danjean
- Rick Danmeier
- Michael Danna
- Ed Danowski
- Karlos Dansby
- Cameron Dantzler
- Woodrow Dantzler
- Fred Danziger
- Neno DaPrato
- Kirby Dar Dar
- Amara Darboh
- Al Darby
- Byron Darby
- Chuck Darby
- Frank Darby
- Kenneth Darby
- Matt Darby
- Paul Darby
- Ronald Darby
- J. P. Darche
- Ramsey Dardar
- Jaelon Darden
- Thom Darden
- Tony Darden
- Marcell Dareus
- Trey Darilek
- Donovin Darius
- Chris Darkins
- Orleans Darkwa
- Boob Darling
- Devard Darling
- James Darling
- Bill Darnall
- Sam Darnold
- Phil Darns
- Matt Darr
- Dan Darragh
- Bernie Darre
- Chris Darrington
- Christian Darrisaw
- Barry Darrow
- Jaxson Dart
- Matt Darwin
- Dane Dastillung
- Russell Daugherity
- Bob Daugherty
- Dick Daugherty
- Ron Daugherty
- Lou Daukas
- Nick Daukas
- Mitch Daum
- Red Daum

== Dav ==
- Charles Davenport
- Joe Dean Davenport
- Julién Davenport
- Marcus Davenport
- Najeh Davenport
- Ron Davenport
- Wayne Davenport
- Don Davey
- Rohan Davey
- Bob David
- Jason David
- Jim David
- Lavonte David
- Stan David
- Norberto Davidds-Garrido
- Ben Davidson
- Bill Davidson
- Chy Davidson
- Cotton Davidson
- DJ Davidson
- Greg Davidson
- Itzy Davidson
- James Davidson
- Jeff Davidson
- Joe Davidson
- Kenny Davidson
- Marlon Davidson
- Pete Davidson
- Zach Davidson
- A. J. Davis
- Akeem Davis
- Andra Davis
- Andre Davis (born 1975)
- André Davis (born 1979)
- Andy Davis
- Anthony Davis (born 1952)
- Anthony Davis (born 1969)
- Anthony Davis (born 1980)
- Anthony Davis (born 1989)
- Antone Davis
- Art Davis
- Ashtyn Davis
- Austin Davis
- Ben Davis
- Bill Davis
- Billy Davis (born 1961)
- Billy Davis (born 1972)
- Bob Davis (born 1914)
- Bob Davis (born 1921)
- Bob Davis (born 1927)
- Bob Davis (born 1945)
- Brad Davis
- Brian Davis
- Britt Davis
- Bruce Davis (born 1956)
- Bruce Davis (born 1963)
- Bruce Davis (born 1985)
- Buddy Davis
- Buster Davis
- Butch Davis
- C. J. Davis
- Carey Davis
- Carl Davis (born 1903)
- Carl Davis (born 1992)
- Carlos Davis
- Carlton Davis
- Charlie Davis (born 1951)
- Charlie Davis (born 1952)
- Chauncey Davis
- Chris Davis (born 1963)
- Chris Davis (born 1979)
- Chris Davis (born 1983)
- Chris Davis (born 1984)
- Chris Davis (born 1990)
- Clarence Davis
- Cody Davis
- Corbett Davis
- Corey Davis
- Craig Davis
- Darrell Davis
- Dave Davis
- Davion Davis
- Demario Davis
- Derius Davis
- Dexter Davis (born 1970)
- Dexter Davis (born 1986)
- Dick Davis (born 1938)
- Dick Davis (born 1946)
- Doc Davis
- Dominique Davis
- Dominique Davis
- Don Davis (born 1943)
- Don Davis (born 1972)
- Donnie Davis
- Dorsett Davis
- Doug Davis
- Drew Davis
- Edward Davis
- Elgin Davis
- Eric Davis
- Frank Davis
- Fred Davis (born 1918)
- Fred Davis (born 1964)
- Fred Davis (born 1986)
- Gabe Davis
- Gaines Davis
- Gary Davis
- Geremy Davis
- Glenn Davis (born 1924)
- Glenn Davis (born 1934)
- Greg Davis
- Hall Davis
- Harper Davis
- Harrison Davis
- Henry Davis
- Herb Davis
- Hermit Davis
- Isaac Davis
- Isaiah Davis
- Jack Davis (born 1932)
- Jack Davis (born 1933)
- Jaden Davis
- Ja'Gared Davis
- Jalen Davis
- Jamal Davis II
- James Davis (born 1957)
- James Davis (born 1979)
- James Davis (born 1986)
- Jamin Davis
- Jarrad Davis
- Jason Davis
- Javaris Davis
- Jawill Davis
- Jeff Davis
- Jerome Davis (born 1962)
- Jerome Davis (born 1974)
- Jerry Davis (born 1924)
- Jerry Davis (born 1951)
- Jesse Davis
- Jim Davis
- Joe Davis
- John Davis (born ?)
- John Davis (born 1965)
- John Davis (born 1973)
- Johnny Davis
- Jordan Davis
- Justin Davis
- Kaden Davis
- Kalia Davis
- Kanorris Davis
- Keionta Davis
- Keith Davis
- Kellen Davis
- Kelvin Davis
- Kenneth Davis
- Khalil Davis
- Knile Davis
- Kyle Davis
- Lamar Davis
- Lee Davis
- Leonard Davis
- Lorenzo Davis
- Malik Davis
- Marvin Davis (born 1943)
- Marvin Davis (born 1952)
- Michael Davis
- Mike Davis (born 1956)
- Mike Davis (born 1972)
- Mike Davis (born 1993)
- Milt Davis
- Nate Davis
- Nathan Davis
- Nick Davis
- Norman Davis
- Oliver Davis
- Pahl Davis
- Paschall Davis
- Paul Davis (born 1925)
- Paul Davis (born 1958)
- Pernell Davis
- Preston Davis
- Raekwon Davis
- Ralph Davis
- Rashard Davis
- Rashied Davis
- Ray Davis (born 1907)
- Ray Davis (born 1999)
- Red Davis
- Reggie Davis
- Reuben Davis
- Ricky Davis
- Rob Davis
- Robert Davis
- Rod Davis
- Roger Davis
- Ron Davis (born 1950)
- Ron Davis (born 1972)
- Rosey Davis
- Russell Davis (born 1956)
- Russell Davis (born 1975)
- Ryan Davis
- Sam Davis
- Sammy Davis
- Scott Davis (born 1965)
- Scott Davis (born 1970)
- Sean Davis
- Shawn Davis
- Shockmain Davis
- Sonny Davis (born 1938)
- Sonny Davis (born 1948)
- Stan Davis
- Stephen Davis
- Steve Davis
- Tae Davis
- Ted Davis
- Terrell Davis
- Thabiti Davis
- Thomas Davis
- Todd Davis
- Tommy Davis
- Tony Davis
- Travis Davis (born 1966)
- Travis Davis (born 1973)
- Trevor Davis
- Troy Davis (born 1975)
- Troy Davis (born 1991)
- Tyler Davis (born 1997)
- Tyler Davis (born 2000)
- Tyree Davis
- Tyrone Davis (born 1961)
- Tyrone Davis (born 1972)
- Van Davis
- Vern Davis
- Vernon Davis
- Vontae Davis
- Wayne Davis (born 1963)
- Wayne Davis (born 1964)
- Wendell Davis (born 1966)
- Wendell Davis (born 1973)
- Wendell Davis (born 1975)
- Will Davis (born 1986)
- Will Davis (born 1990)
- Willie Davis (born 1934)
- Willie Davis (born 1967)
- Wyatt Davis
- Zola Davis
- Akeem Davis-Gaither
- Tyrion Davis-Price
- Andrew Davison
- Jerone Davison
- Tyeler Davison
- Mike Davlin

== Daw–Del ==
- Brian Dawkins
- Dale Dawkins
- Dalyn Dawkins
- Dion Dawkins
- Everett Dawkins
- Joe Dawkins
- Julius Dawkins
- Noah Dawkins
- Sean Dawkins
- Tommy Dawkins
- Fred Dawley
- Lawrence Dawsey
- Stacey Dawsey
- Bill Dawson
- Clifton Dawson
- Dale Dawson
- Dermontti Dawson
- Doug Dawson
- Duke Dawson
- Gib Dawson
- JaJuan Dawson
- Keyunta Dawson
- Lake Dawson
- Len Dawson
- Lin Dawson
- Mike Dawson
- Paul Dawson
- Phil Dawson
- Rhett Dawson
- Skye Dawson
- Al Day
- Eagle Day
- Fred Day
- Sheldon Day
- Terry Day
- Tom Day
- Matthew Dayes
- Harry Dayhoff
- Tony Daykin
- Ron Dayne
- Brian de la Puente
- Divine Deablo
- Brandon Deaderick
- Rufus Deal
- Floyd Dean
- Fred Dean (born 1952)
- Fred Dean (born 1955)
- Hal Dean
- Jamel Dean
- Jimmy Dean
- Kevin Dean
- Larry Dean
- Nakobe Dean
- Randy Dean
- Ted Dean
- Tom Dean
- Vernon Dean
- Walter Dean
- James Dearth
- Kiki DeAyala
- Donte Deayon
- Steve DeBerg
- Fred DeBernardi
- Case deBruijn
- Nick DeCarbo
- Art DeCarlo
- David DeCastro
- Dom DeCicco
- Eric Decker
- Taylor Decker
- Evan Deckers
- Frank DeClerk
- Bill DeCorrevont
- Thomas DeCoud
- Treston Decoud
- Austin Deculus
- Justin Dedich
- Bob Dee
- Donnie Dee
- Don Deeks
- Branson Deen
- Dick Deer Slayer
- Bob Dees
- Derrick Deese
- Nick DeFelice
- Lou DeFilippo
- Joe DeForest
- Chris DeFrance
- Bob DeFruiter
- Chris DeGeare
- Dick Degen
- Allen DeGraffenreid (born 1970)
- Allen DeGraffenreid (born 1974)
- Tony Degrate
- Cy DeGree
- Jack DeGrenier
- Josiah Deguara
- Art Deibel
- Michael Deiter
- Cooper DeJean
- Charles DeJurnett
- Al Dekdebrun
- Jonathan Dekker
- Paul Dekker
- Jack Del Bello
- Jim Del Gaizo
- Al Del Greco
- Jack Del Rio
- Ryan Delaire
- Joe DeLamielleure
- Dee Delaney
- Jeff Delaney
- Joe Delaney
- Darroll DeLaPorte
- Bob deLauer
- Tom DeLeone
- Burt Delevan
- Jake Delhomme
- Steve DeLine
- Jim DeLisle
- Tank Dell
- Jeff Dellenbach
- Spiro Dellerba
- Garrett Dellinger
- Larry Dellinger
- Johnny Dell Isola
- Louis Delmas
- Jerry DeLoach
- Ralph DeLoach
- Curtis DeLoatch
- Greg DeLong
- Keith DeLong
- Steve DeLong
- Jack Deloplaine
- Robert Delpino
- Grant Delpit
- Ben DeLuca
- Nick DeLuca
- Sam DeLuca
- Tony DeLuca
- Jerry DeLucca

== Dem–Dex ==
- Al DeMao
- Enoch DeMar
- Bob DeMarco
- Brian DeMarco
- Mario DeMarco
- Chris Demaree
- John Demarie
- George Demas
- Jamil Demby
- Kenny Demens
- Emari Demercado
- Calvin Demery
- George Demko
- John Demmy
- Bill Demory
- Bob DeMoss
- Jeff Demps
- Quintin Demps
- Will Demps
- Frank Dempsey
- Jack Dempsey
- Tom Dempsey
- Rick DeMulling
- Vern Den Herder
- Trevor Denbow
- Patrick Dendy
- Fred Denfeld
- Anthony Denham
- Anthony Denman
- Alfonzo Dennard
- Darqueze Dennard
- Mark Dennard
- Preston Dennard
- Jerry Dennerlein
- Mike Dennery
- Vince Dennery
- Austin Denney
- John Denney
- Ryan Denney
- Al Dennis
- Guy Dennis
- Mark Dennis
- Mike Dennis (born 1944)
- Mike Dennis (born 1958)
- Pat Dennis
- SirVocea Dennis
- Doug Dennison
- Glenn Dennison
- Rick Dennison
- Earl Denny
- Al Denson
- Autry Denson
- Damon Denson
- Keith Denson
- Moses Denson
- Akeem Dent
- Burnell Dent
- Richard Dent
- Bob Denton
- Tim Denton
- Winnie Denton
- John Denvir
- Steve DeOssie
- Zak DeOssie
- Andrew DePaola
- Carmine DePascal
- Tom DePaso
- Henry DePaul
- Jack Depler
- John Depner
- Jerry DePoyster
- Lee DeRamus
- Jimmy DeRatt
- A. J. Derby
- Dean Derby
- Glenn Derby
- John Derby
- Dan Dercher
- Art Deremer
- Fred DeRiggi
- Robert Derleth
- Al DeRogatis
- Brian DeRoo
- Dan DeRose
- Ben Derr
- Paul Des Jardien
- Dan DeSantis
- Dick Deschaine
- Chuck DeShane
- Pierre Desir
- Versil Deskin
- Donald R. Deskins, Jr.
- Darrell Dess
- Fred DeStefano
- Wayne DeSutter
- Harold Deters
- Koy Detmer
- Ty Detmer
- Chuck Detwiler
- John Detwiler
- Seth DeValve
- Kyle DeVan
- Dennis DeVaughn
- James Develin
- Jordan Devey
- Kevin Devine
- Rob DeVita
- Mike DeVito
- Tommy DeVito
- Chuck DeVleigher
- Chris Devlin
- Joe Devlin
- Mark Devlin
- Mike Devlin
- Todd Devoe
- Tyson DeVree
- Jared DeVries
- Jed DeVries
- Jim Dewar
- Ebby DeWeese
- Billy Dewell
- Herb DeWitz
- Rufe DeWitz
- Willard Dewveall
- Gervon Dexter
- James Dexter

== Di ==
- Mohamoud Diabate
- YaYa Diaby
- Alan Dial
- Benjy Dial
- Buddy Dial
- Marcellas Dial
- Quinton Dial
- Bill Diamond
- Charley Diamond
- Lorenzo Diamond
- Rich Diana
- Jorge Diaz
- David Diaz-Infante
- John Dibb
- Dorne Dibble
- Rick DiBernardo
- Jim Dick
- Dan Dickel
- Cameron Dicker
- Andy Dickerson
- Anthony Dickerson
- Dorin Dickerson
- Eric Dickerson
- Garrett Dickerson
- Kori Dickerson
- Landon Dickerson
- Matt Dickerson
- Ron Dickerson, Jr.
- Charlie Dickey
- Curtis Dickey
- Eldridge Dickey
- Lynn Dickey
- Wallace Dickey
- Bo Dickinson
- Parnell Dickinson
- Tom Dickinson
- Ed Dickson
- Michael Dickson
- Paul Dickson
- Chuck Dicus
- Clint Didier
- Mark Didio
- John Didion
- Dahrran Diedrick
- Charlie Diehl
- Dave Diehl
- David Diehl
- John Diehl
- Wally Diehl
- Doug Dieken
- Kris Dielman
- Ryan Diem
- Dan Dierdorf
- Scott Dierking
- Gehrig Dieter
- Herb Dieter
- Chris Dieterich
- Evan Dietrich-Smith
- John Diettrich
- Dave diFilippo
- Fadil Diggs
- Na'il Diggs
- Quandre Diggs
- Shelton Diggs
- Stefon Diggs
- Trevon Diggs
- Curt DiGiacomo
- John DiGiorgio
- Bernie Digris
- Chimere Dike
- Christian DiLauro
- Zac Diles
- Trent Dilfer
- Ken Dilger
- Scott Dill
- Ellis Dillahunt
- Andre Dillard
- Jarett Dillard
- Phillip Dillard
- Stacey Dillard
- A. J. Dillon
- Bobby Dillon
- Brandon Dillon
- Corey Dillon
- K. J. Dillon
- Terry Dillon
- Steve Dils
- Bucky Dilts
- Anthony Dilweg
- LaVern Dilweg
- Jayson DiManche
- Babe Dimancheff
- Patrick DiMarco
- Tony DiMidio
- Tom Dimitroff, Sr.
- Rich Dimler
- Don Dimmick
- Tom Dimmick
- Ryan D'Imperio
- Charles Dimry
- Victor Dimukeje
- Gennaro DiNapoli
- Adrian Dingle
- Antonio Dingle
- Mike Dingle
- Nate Dingle
- Tom Dinkel
- Darnell Dinkins
- Howard Dinkins
- Ben DiNucci
- Terry Dion
- Jerry Diorio
- Ray DiPierro
- CJ Dippre
- Johnnie Dirden
- Fred DiRenzo
- J.D. DiRenzo
- Robert DiRico
- Mike Dirks
- Tony Discenzo
- Leo Disend
- Chris Dishman
- Cris Dishman
- Will Dissly
- Mike Ditka
- John Dittrich
- Lamar Divens
- Joe DiVito
- Ahmad Dixon
- Al Dixon
- Andre Dixon
- Anthony Dixon
- Antonio Dixon
- Brandon Dixon
- Brian Dixon
- Cal Dixon
- David Dixon
- De'Shaan Dixon
- Dennis Dixon
- Dwayne Dixon
- Ernest Dixon
- Floyd Dixon
- Gerald Dixon
- Hanford Dixon
- Hewritt Dixon
- James Dixon
- Joe Dixon
- Kenneth Dixon
- Marcus Dixon
- Mark Dixon
- Randy Dixon
- Rich Dixon
- Rickey Dixon
- Riley Dixon
- Ron Dixon
- Ronnie Dixon
- Titus Dixon
- Tony Dixon
- Travell Dixon
- Zachary Dixon
- Jordon Dizon

== Doa–Dor ==
- Dinger Doane
- Herb Dobbins
- J.K. Dobbins
- Ollie Dobbins
- Tim Dobbins
- Demarcus Dobbs
- Glenn Dobbs
- Joshua Dobbs
- Dick Dobeleit
- Bob Dobelstein
- Conrad Dobler
- Emil Dobry
- Aaron Dobson
- Derrick Dockery
- James Dockery
- John Dockery
- Kevin Dockery
- Darnell Dockett
- Josh Doctson
- Al Dodd
- Kevin Dodd
- Dedrick Dodge
- Kirk Dodge
- Matt Dodge
- Dale Dodrill
- Les Dodson
- Tyrel Dodson
- John Doehring
- Sonny Doell
- Fred Doelling
- Jerry Doerger
- Chris Doering
- Jason Doering
- Michael Dogbe
- Kevin Dogins
- George Doherty
- Mel Doherty
- Tom Dohring
- Steve Doig
- Phil Dokes
- Shaun Dolac
- Cliff Dolaway
- Jack Dolbin
- Chris Doleman
- Don Doll
- Tony Dollinger
- Dick Dolly
- JoJo Domann
- Paul Dombroski
- Brandyn Dombrowski
- Jim Dombrowski
- Leon Dombrowski
- Matt Dominguez
- Joe Domnanovich
- Marty Domres
- Tom Domres
- Dylan Donahue
- Jack Donahue
- Mark Donahue
- Mitch Donahue
- Oscar Donahue
- Ryan Donahue
- Aaron Donald
- Gene Donaldson (born 1930)
- Gene Donaldson (born 1942)
- Jeff Donaldson
- John Donaldson
- Ray Donaldson
- Waldo Don Carlos
- Tom Donchez
- Bill Donckers
- Al Donelli
- Doug Donley
- Jim Donlin
- Roger Donnahoo
- Andrew Donnal
- Kevin Donnalley (born 1958)
- Kevin Donnalley (born 1968)
- Rick Donnalley
- Ben Donnell
- Larry Donnell
- George Donnelly
- Rick Donnelly
- Mark D'Onofrio
- Bill Donohoe
- Mike Donohoe
- Leon Donohue
- Art Donovan
- Pat Donovan
- Tom Donovan
- Jack Doolan
- Jim Dooley
- John Dooley
- Dan Doornink
- Vontarrius Dora
- Jim Doran
- Joe D'Orazio
- Jon Dorenbos
- Art Dorfman
- Makinton Dorleant
- Brandon Dorlus
- Myles Dorn
- Torin Dorn
- Thom Dornbrook
- Keith Dorney
- Dale Dorning
- Al Dorow
- Andy Dorris
- Derek Dorris
- Travis Dorsch
- Anthony Dorsett
- Matthew Dorsett
- Phillip Dorsett
- Tony Dorsett
- Char-ron Dorsey
- Dean Dorsey
- DeDe Dorsey
- Dick Dorsey
- Eric Dorsey
- Glenn Dorsey
- John Dorsey
- Ken Dorsey
- Kevin Dorsey
- Khalil Dorsey
- Larry Dorsey
- Nat Dorsey
- Nate Dorsey
- Greg Dortch

== Dos–Doz ==
- Keelan Doss
- Lorenzo Doss
- Mike Doss
- Noble Doss
- Reggie Doss
- Tandon Doss
- Al Dotson
- Demar Dotson
- DeWayne Dotson
- Earl Dotson
- Elijah Dotson
- Jahan Dotson
- Kevin Dotson
- Lionel Dotson
- Santana Dotson
- John Dottley
- Dan Doubiago
- Romeo Doubs
- Early Doucet
- Forrest Douds
- Bob Dougherty
- Phil Dougherty
- Glenn Doughty
- Reed Doughty
- Ben Douglas
- Bob Douglas
- Dameane Douglas
- David Douglas (born 1963)
- David Douglas (born 1989)
- Demario Douglas
- Derrick Douglas
- Dewayne Douglas
- Dominic Douglas
- Freddie Douglas
- Harry Douglas
- Hugh Douglas
- Jamil Douglas
- Jay Douglas
- John Douglas
- John Douglas
- Leland Douglas
- Marques Douglas
- Merrill Douglas
- Omar Douglas
- Otis Douglas
- Rasul Douglas
- Robert Douglas
- Steve Douglas
- Bobby Douglass
- Leo Douglass
- Maurice Douglass
- Mike Douglass
- Ty Douthard
- Earl Douthitt
- Leger Douzable
- Bob Dove
- Eddie Dove
- Jerome Dove
- Wes Dove
- Harley Dow
- Ken Dow
- Woody Dow
- Jerry Dowd
- Harry Dowda
- Marcus Dowdell
- Corey Dowden
- Steve Dowden
- Mike Dowdle
- Rico Dowdle
- Andrew Dowell
- Colton Dowell
- Mule Dowell
- Boyd Dowler
- Tommy Dowler
- Brian Dowling
- Jonathan Dowling
- Pat Dowling
- Ras-I Dowling
- Sean Dowling
- Eric Downing
- Walt Downing
- Bob Downs
- Devante Downs
- Ethan Downs
- Gary Downs
- Josh Downs
- Michael Downs
- Xavier Downwind
- Perry Dowrick
- Marcus Dowtin
- Todd Doxzon
- Dick Doyle
- Ed Doyle
- Eddie Doyle
- Jack Doyle
- Ted Doyle
- Tommy Doyle
- Cornelius Dozier
- D. J. Dozier
- Dakota Dozier

== Dr–Dul ==
- Chris Draft
- Oscar Dragon
- Scott Dragos
- Bill Drake
- Jerry Drake
- Joe Drake
- Johnny Drake
- Kenyan Drake
- Troy Drake
- Tyronne Drakeford
- Dwight Drane
- Spencer Drango
- Shaun Draughn
- Leo Draveling
- Jim Dray
- Clarence Drayer
- Troy Drayton
- Chuck Drazenovich
- Dave Drechsler
- Joel Dreessen
- Ferd Dreher
- Justin Drescher
- Chris Dressel
- Chuck Dressen
- Doug Dressler
- Willie Drewrey
- Ted Drews
- Wally Dreyer
- Jack Driscoll
- Paddy Driscoll
- Jeff Driskel
- Ethan Driskell
- Joe Driskill
- Donald Driver
- Stacey Driver
- Tony Driver
- Shane Dronett
- Jeff Drost
- Tom Drougas
- Reuben Droughns
- Darren Drozdov
- Jim Druckenmiller
- Al Drulis
- Chuck Drulis
- Dylan Drummond
- Eddie Drummond
- Kurtis Drummond
- Robert Drummond
- Wop Drumstead
- Elbert Drungo
- Hoot Drury
- Rick Druschel
- Johnny Druze
- Fred Dryer
- Ron Drzewiecki
- George Duarte
- Thomas Duarte
- Elbert Dubenion
- Greg Dubinetz
- Tom Dublinski
- Maury Dubofsky
- Phil DuBois
- Demetrius DuBose
- Doug DuBose
- Grant DuBose
- Jimmy DuBose
- Walt Dubzinski
- Vladimir Ducasse
- Storm Duck
- Mark Duckens
- Damane Duckett
- Forey Duckett
- Kenny Duckett
- T. J. Duckett
- Robert Ducksworth
- Bobby Duckworth
- Joe Duckworth
- Tim Duckworth
- Moon Ducote
- Greg Ducre
- Mark Duda
- Joe Dudek
- Mitch Dudek
- Dick Duden
- Andy Dudish
- Bill Dudley
- Brian Dudley
- Kevin Dudley
- Paul Dudley
- Rickey Dudley
- Dave Duerson
- Paul Dufault
- Don Dufek
- Joe Dufek
- Bill Duff
- Jamal Duff
- John Duff
- Jim Dufft
- Pat Duffy
- Roger Duffy
- Dukes Duford
- Dan Dufour
- Bill Dugan
- Fred Dugan
- Jeff Dugan
- Len Dugan
- Ron Dugans
- Eddie Duggan
- Gil Duggan
- Jack Dugger
- Kyle Dugger
- Herb Duggins
- Paul Duhart
- A. J. Duhe
- Bobby Duhon
- Steve Duich
- Khalid Duke
- Paul Duke
- Wesley Duke
- Chad Dukes
- Jamie Dukes
- Mike Dukes
- Bill DuLac
- Mike Dulaney
- Greg Dulcich
- Chris Duliban
- Ashton Dulin
- Gary Dulin

== Dum–Dz ==
- Mike Dumas
- Troy Dumas
- Jon Dumbauld
- Elvis Dumervil
- Doug Dumler
- Bill DuMoe
- Joe DuMoe
- Jim Dumont
- Craig Dunaway
- Dave Dunaway
- Jim Dunaway
- Jo-Lonn Dunbar
- Jubilee Dunbar
- Karl Dunbar
- Lance Dunbar
- LaTarence Dunbar
- Quinton Dunbar
- Steven Dunbar
- Vaughn Dunbar
- Brian Duncan
- Clyde Duncan
- Curtis Duncan
- Frank Duncan
- Howard Duncan
- Jaelyn Duncan
- Jamie Duncan
- Jim Duncan (born 1924)
- Jim Duncan (born 1946)
- Ken Duncan
- Maury Duncan
- Randy Duncan
- Rick Duncan
- Ron Duncan
- Speedy Duncan
- Tim Duncan
- Bob Duncum
- Ken Dunek
- Tony Dungy
- Tom Duniven
- Bob Dunlap
- Carlos Dunlap
- King Dunlap
- Lenny Dunlap
- Anthony Dunn
- Bob Dunn
- Brandon Dunn
- Casey Dunn
- Coye Dunn
- Damon Dunn
- David Dunn
- Earl Dunn
- Gary Dunn
- Isaiah Dunn
- Jason Dunn
- K. D. Dunn
- Michael Dunn
- Paul Dunn
- Perry Lee Dunn
- Red Dunn
- Roddy Dunn
- Warrick Dunn
- Pat Dunnigan
- Pat Dunsmore
- Bill Dunstan
- Elwyn Dunstan
- Reggie Dupard
- Mark Duper
- Charlie Dupre
- L. G. Dupre
- Malachi Dupre
- Billy Joe DuPree
- Bud Dupree
- Marcus Dupree
- Myron Dupree
- Ryan Durand
- Pete Duranko
- Cobie Durant
- Justin Durant
- Yasir Durant
- Don Durdan
- Cory Durden
- Kenneth Durden
- Clarence Duren
- Kris Durham
- Payne Durham
- Steve Durham
- Jack Durishan
- Charlie Durkee
- John Durko
- Sandy Durko
- Jeff Durkota
- Mike Durrette
- Mark Dusbabek
- Brad Dusek
- Bill Dusenbery
- Joe DuSossoit
- Bill Dutton
- John Dutton (born 1951)
- Earl Duvall
- Devin Duvernay
- Laurent Duvernay-Tardif
- Dusty Dvoracek
- Ben Dvorak
- Rick Dvorak
- Ross Dwelley
- Tim Dwight
- Dan Dworsky
- Michael Dwumfour
- Bob Dwyer
- Jack Dwyer
- Jonathan Dwyer
- Mike Dwyer
- Mike Dyal
- Donteea Dye
- Ernest Dye
- Les Dye
- Tony Dye
- Troy Dye
- Deon Dyer
- Henry Dyer
- Ken Dyer
- Donald Dykes
- Hart Lee Dykes
- Keilen Dykes
- Sean Dykes
- Chris Dyko
- Andre Dyson
- Kenny Dyson
- Kevin Dyson
- Matt Dyson
- Nick Dzubnar
