= List of Xavier Musketeers in the NFL draft =

This is a list of Xavier Musketeers football players in the NFL draft.

== Key ==
B	Back	K	Kicker	NT	Nose tackle
C	Center	LB	Linebacker	FB	Fullback
DB	Defensive back	P	Punter	HB	Halfback
DE	Defensive end	QB	Quarterback	WR	Wide receiver
DT	Defensive tackle	RB	Running back	G	Guard
E	End	T	Offensive tackle	TE	Tight end

== Selections ==
Year	Round	Pick	Player	Team	Position
1939	22	197	Al Howe	Detroit Lions	T
1943	20	182	Chet Mutryn	Philadelphia Eagles	B
1943	28	262	Jim Arata	Philadelphia Eagles	T
1947	24	221	Stanton Hense	Philadelphia Eagles	E
1948	28	265	Ray Stackhouse	Chicago Cardinals	T
1949	15	150	Bob McQuade	Chicago Cardinals	B
1950	16	209	Jim Marck	Philadelphia Eagles	T
1951	1	8	Chet Mutryn	Philadelphia Eagles	B
1951	6	65	John Martinkovic	Washington Redskins	E
1951	18	209	Jim Murphy	San Francisco 49ers	T
1951	19	222	Jim Liber	Green Bay Packers	B
1952	4	42	Jack Gearding	Pittsburgh Steelers	T
1952	5	54	Jack Hoffman	Chicago Bears	E
1952	9	108	Bob Finnell	Cleveland Browns	B
1952	10	114	George Gilmartin	Pittsburgh Steelers	B
1952	30	360	John Saban	Cleveland Browns	B
1954	5	58	Art Hauser	Los Angeles Rams	T
1956	23	275	Don St. John	Washington Redskins	B
1956	26	303	Francis E. Sweeney	Pittsburgh Steelers	G
1957	4	48	Steve Junker	Detroit Lions	E
1957	27	318	Bob Konkoly	Pittsburgh Steelers	B
1958	20	240	Ed Serieka	Cleveland Browns	B
1959	19	226	Joe Schroeder	Cleveland Browns	T
1959	24	287	Russ Goings	Cleveland Browns	G
1960	5	60	Edward Mazurek	St. Louis Cardinals	T
1962	11	154	Jim Thrush	Green Bay Packers	T
1962	16	217	John Nelson	Chicago Bears	C
1963	14	195	Bill O'Brien	Detroit Lions	T
1964	19	263	Jim Higgins	Cleveland Browns	G
1965	20	277	George Wilson	Detroit Lions	QB
1966	19	276	Walt Mainer	Atlanta Falcons	DB
1967	15	391	Dennis Caponi	Kansas City Chiefs	RB
1967	17	420	Danny Abramowicz	New Orleans Saints	RB
1968	14	362	Ray Blunk	Miami Dolphins	TE
1969	1	17	John Shinners	New Orleans Saints	G
1969	6	132	Richard Barnhorst	Philadelphia Eagles	TE
1969	15	371	Bill Waller	New Orleans Saints	WR
1969	17	427	Tom Krallman	Miami Dolphins	DE
1970	16	402	Vic Nolting	New York Giants	DB
1974	12	306	Rudy McClinon	Cincinnati Bengals	DB
