= Robert Sykes =

Robert or Bob Sykes may refer to:

- Bob Sykes (American football) (born 1927), former American football fullback
- Bob Sykes (baseball) (born 1954), retired Major League Baseball pitcher
- Bob Sykes (ice hockey) (born 1951), ice hockey player
- Robert "Pliers" Sykes, Wing Commander character
- Prof. Robert Sykes, see Snowburst

== See also ==
- Bob Sikes (1906–1994), American politician
- Bob Sikes Airport
