= List of Pepperdine Waves in the NFL draft =

This is a list of Pepperdine Waves football players in the NFL draft.

== Key ==
B	Back	K	Kicker	NT	Nose tackle
C	Center	LB	Linebacker	FB	Fullback
DB	Defensive back	P	Punter	HB	Halfback
DE	Defensive end	QB	Quarterback	WR	Wide receiver
DT	Defensive tackle	RB	Running back	G	Guard
E	End	T	Offensive tackle	TE	Tight end

== Selections ==
Year	Round	Pick	Player	Team	Position
1951	23	274	Jack Bighead	Philadelphia Eagles	E
1952	15	170	Jack Bighead	Dallas Texans	E
1952	29	349	Gerry Perry	Los Angeles Rams	DE

* Pick was made as part of the original AFL draft to stock the new league.
** Pick was made in the regular AFL draft (1961–1966).
*** Pick was made in the AFL Redshirt draft (1965–1966).
