= List of Eastern Michigan Eagles in the NFL draft =

This is a list of Eastern Michigan Eagles in the NFL draft.

== Key ==
B	Back	K	Kicker	NT	Nose tackle
C	Center	LB	Linebacker	FB	Fullback
DB	Defensive back	P	Punter	HB	Halfback
DE	Defensive end	QB	Quarterback	WR	Wide receiver
DT	Defensive tackle	RB	Running back	G	Guard
E	End	T	Offensive tackle	TE	Tight end

== Selections ==
Year	Round	Pick	Overall	Player	Team	Position
1955	21	2	243	Nick Manych	Baltimore Colts	E
1967	13	13	328	Robert Rodwell	Washington Redskins	LB
1970	14	15	353	Bob Lints	Green Bay Packers	G
1971	3	20	72	Al Clark	Detroit Lions	DB
1972	6	12	142	Dave Pureifory	Green Bay Packers	LB
1972	7	14	170	Will Foster	Philadelphia Eagles	LB
1972	8	14	196	Larry Ratcliff	Philadelphia Eagles	RB
1972	13	13	325	Sam Elmore	New England Patriots	DB
1973	7	11	167	Bill DuLac	Los Angeles Rams	G
1973	10	26	260	Ron Fernandes	Miami Dolphins	DE
1974	6	2	132	Jim Pietrzak	New York Giants	T
1974	11	25	285	Dave Boone	Minnesota Vikings	DE
1974	13	21	333	Frank Kolch	Pittsburgh Steelers	QB
1975	14	25	363	Mike Strickland	Minnesota Vikings	RB
1976	7	22	204	Clarence Chapman	Oakland Raiders	WR
1977	10	13	264	Mark Carter	Miami Dolphins	TE
1977	12	12	319	Jim Stansik	San Diego Chargers	TE
1978	1	22	22	Ron Johnson	Pittsburgh Steelers	DB
1981	7	25	191	Ken Miller	Dallas Cowboys	DB
1988	7	7	172	Gary Patton	New York Jets	RB
1998	2	30	60	Charlie Batch	Detroit Lions	QB
1999	1	21	21	L. J. Shelton	Arizona Cardinals	T
2003	7	41	255	Kevin Walter	New York Giants	WR
2005	7	23	237	Chris Roberson	Jacksonville Jaguars	DB
2008	2	23	54	Jason Jones	Tennessee Titans	DE
2009	4	9	109	T. J. Lang	Green Bay Packers	T
2016	6	41	216	Darius Jackson	Dallas Cowboys	RB
2017	7	32	250	Pat O'Connor	Detroit Lions	DE
2019	4	4	106	Maxx Crosby	Oakland Raiders	DE
2023	4	15	117	Sidy Sow	New England Patriots	G
2023	6	19	196	Jose Ramirez	Tampa Bay Buccaneers	LB

== Notable undrafted players ==
Note: No drafts held before 1920

Debut year	Player name	Position	Debut NFL/AFL team	Notes
1960	Al Day	LB	Denver Broncos	—
1960	Chuck Shonta	CB	Boston Patriots	—
1969	Garry Grady	DB	Miami Dolphins	—
1975	John Banaszak	DT	Pittsburgh Steelers	—
