= January 1966 North American blizzard =

Natural disaster in Canada and the US

The Blizzard of 1966
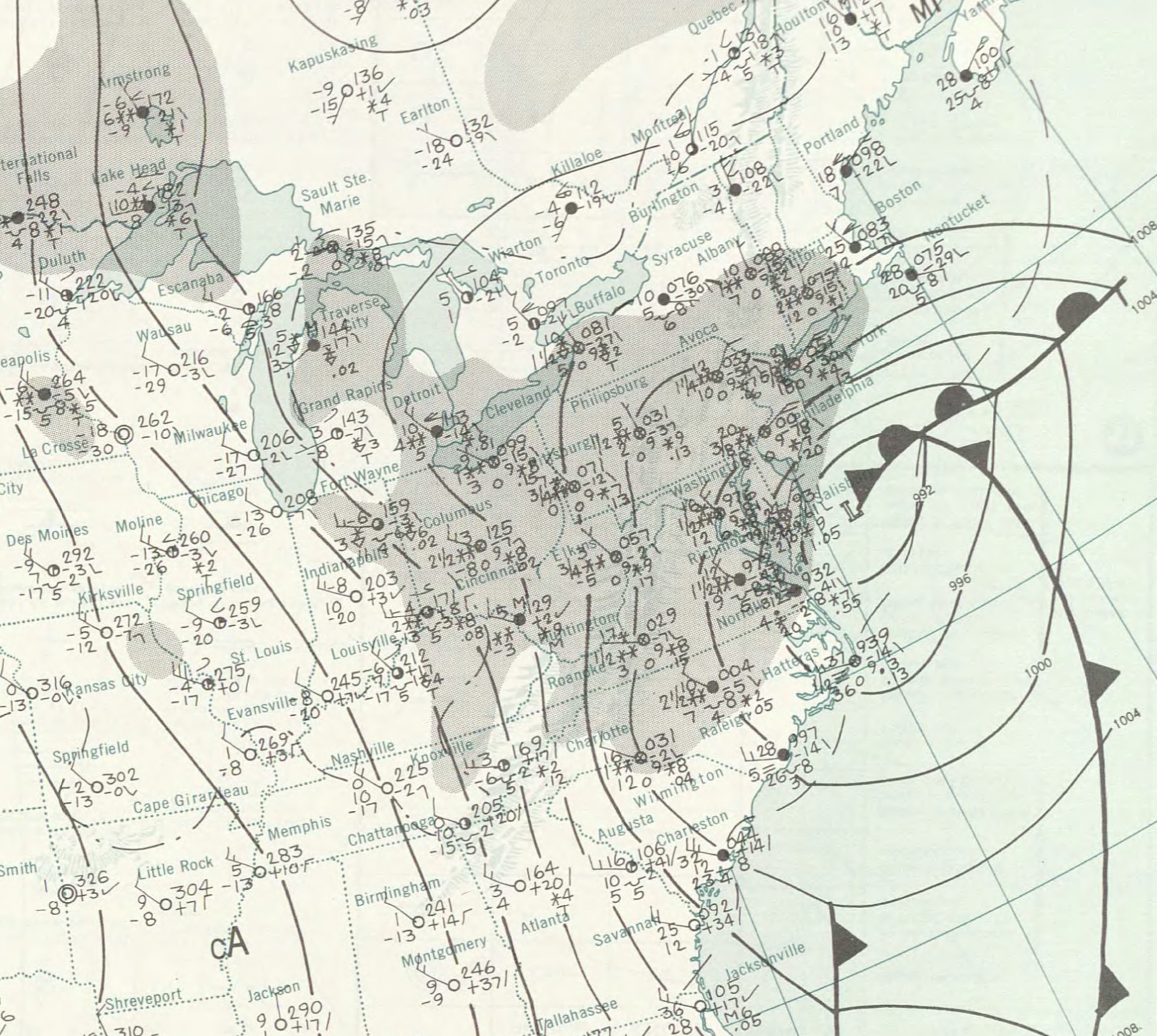
- Weather map of the storm on January 30

Meteorological history
- Formed: January 27, 1966
- Dissipated: January 31, 1966

Category 4 "Crippling" blizzard
- Regional snowfall index: 12.28 (NOAA)
- Maximum snowfall or ice accretion: 103 inches (260 cm) Oswego, New York

Overall effects
- Fatalities: 201

The Blizzard of 1966 was a nor'easter that impacted the Northeastern United States and Eastern Canada from January 29 to February 1, 1966. Heavy lake effect snows preceded the cyclonic storm southeast of Lake Ontario. In and around the Lake Ontario snow belt, the storm period is considered to have lasted from January 27 to February 1, 1966, and the blizzard was a combination nor'easter and lake effect event in this region.

== Preceding weather ==
On January 22–23, 1966, a cyclone that preceded the Blizzard of 1966 impacted Western New York and Southern Ontario. Toronto received 44 centimetres (17 in) of snow. The city of Batavia, New York, and Genesee County had 2 feet (0.61 m) of snow fall on that Saturday night alone. The only thing that prevented that snowstorm from becoming a true blizzard like this infamous one of the very next weekend was the lack of high winds.

Prior to the event, temperatures plunged to record low levels in central and northern New York as Arctic air dominated in the wake of an earlier cyclone. Syracuse, New York, tied its official record low of −26 °F (−32 °C) on January 26.

== The blizzard ==
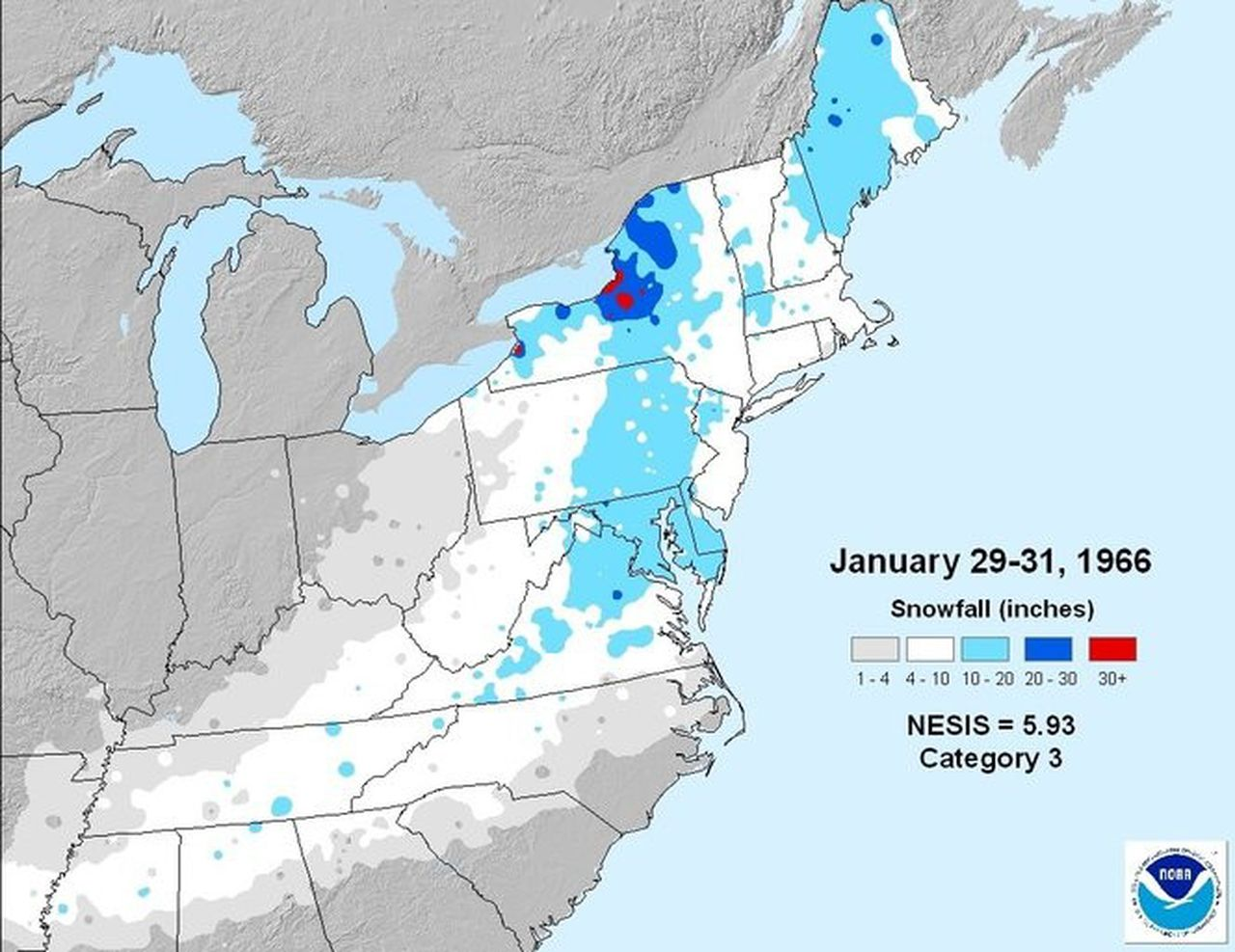
Snowfall totals from the storm through January 29-31

Within days, at least 142 people would be killed. 31 had frozen to death, and 46 died in fires that started while they were trying to heat their homes. Others died from heart attacks while shovelling snow or pushing cars, or from traffic accidents caused by slick roads. The death toll reached 201 by Wednesday, February 2, as the storm eased.

New Market, Alabama, recorded a state record low of −27 °F or −32.8 °C on January 30, while on the same morning Corinth, Mississippi also recorded an all-time state coldest temperature of −19 °F or −28.3 °C.

On Monday, January 31, federal government employees in Washington were excused from reporting to work, and international airports were closed from Boston to Washington, D.C. The additional accumulation raised the snow level to 13 inches or 0.33 metres in Norfolk, Virginia.

== East of Lake Ontario ==
Heavy lake effect snow fell southeast of Lake Ontario on January 27, 28, and 29, before the heavy snows from the cyclone reached the area on January 30. Lake effect bands continued to impact northern Cayuga, Onondaga, Madison, Oswego, and Oneida counties even during the cyclonic portion of the event on January 30–31.

Winds were more than 60 miles per hour (97 km/h) during the storm. The snow was badly drifted and roads and schools closed as long as a week. Drifts covered entire two-story houses.

A total of 102 inches or 2.6 metres of snow was recorded at Southwest Oswego by meteorologist and associate earth science professor Robert Sykes Jr. His total includes 50 inches or 1.3 metres of this falling on the calendar day of January 31 alone. Sykes' measurement methodology was designed to arrive at a "true" snowfall total and account for the settling effects of the wind on snow accumulation. His methodology included estimation and frequent measurements. While Sykes methodology was certainly rigorous and scientific, it is not directly comparable to official snowfall measuring practices utilized by the National Weather Service.

The official Oswego snowfall total for the storm, measured by the cooperative observer at the State University College at Oswego was 68 inches or 1.7 metres. Retired former federal meteorologist and cooperative observer at Oswego, Elmer Loveridge, maintained a private weather station at his home on Ellen Street in Oswego after the Weather Bureau Office in Oswego was closed in the early 1950s. Loveridge measured 71.5 inches or 1.8 metres of snow during the event using standard methodology.

The heaviest snowfall centered from northern Cayuga and western Oswego County inland through central Oswego County into the southern Tug Hill of northern Oneida County. Storm totals of roughly seven feet were observed in central Oswego and northwest Oneida counties. Official storm totals include 89.5 inches (2.3 m) at Mallory, Oswego County, 84 inches (2.1 m) at Bennetts Bridge, Oswego County, and 80.7 inches (2.0 m) at Camden, Oneida County.

50 inches or 1.3 metres of snow were recorded at Camden, New York on January 31. This is the official largest single day snowfall in New York history. The last day of the blizzard the winds subsided and snowburst conditions prevailed, with the snow falling straight down. Fair Haven did not have official snowfall records at the time, but state troopers reported measuring 100 inches (2.5 m) of snow on the level, where none had been prior to the storm. Syracuse, New York received a record snowfall of 42.3 inches (1.1 m) which remained their heaviest storm on record, until the Blizzard of 1993.

At Oswego, the storm lasted from January 27 to January 31, 1966, a total of 4½ days. The daily snowfall totals for Southwest Oswego, as measured by Professor Robert Sykes Jr, are as follows.

- January 27, 1966: 8 inches (0.20 m)
- January 28, 1966: 12 inches (0.30 m)
- January 29, 1966: 11 inches (0.28 m)
- January 30, 1966: 21 inches (0.53 m)
- January 31, 1966: 50 inches (1.3 m)

== See also ==
- List of regional snowfall index category 4 winter storms
