= Darn =

Darn may refer to:

- Darning, a sewing technique
- Darn, a minced oath for "damn"

== See also ==
- Phil Darns (born 1959), American football player
