= Marv Berschet =

American football player (1929–2011)

No. 60
- Positions: Defensive end, guard

Personal information
- Born: December 28, 1929; Arlington Heights, Illinois, U.S.
- Died: July 12, 2011 (aged 81); South Charleston, Ohio, U.S.
- Listed height: 6 ft 2 in (1.88 m)
- Listed weight: 220 lb (100 kg)

Career information
- High school: Arlington (Arlington Heights)
- College: Illinois (1950–1951)
- NFL draft: 1952: 16th round, 187th overall pick

Career history
- Washington Redskins (1954–1955)

Career NFL statistics
- Games played: 16
- Games started: 10
- Fumble recoveries: 1
- Stats at Pro Football Reference

Marvin Walter Berschet (December 28, 1929 - July 12, 2011) was an American professional football defensive end and guard in the National Football League (NFL) for the Washington Redskins. He played college football at the University of Illinois and was selected in the sixteenth round of the 1952 NFL draft.
