= Tom McCormick (American football) =

American football player and coach (1930–2012)

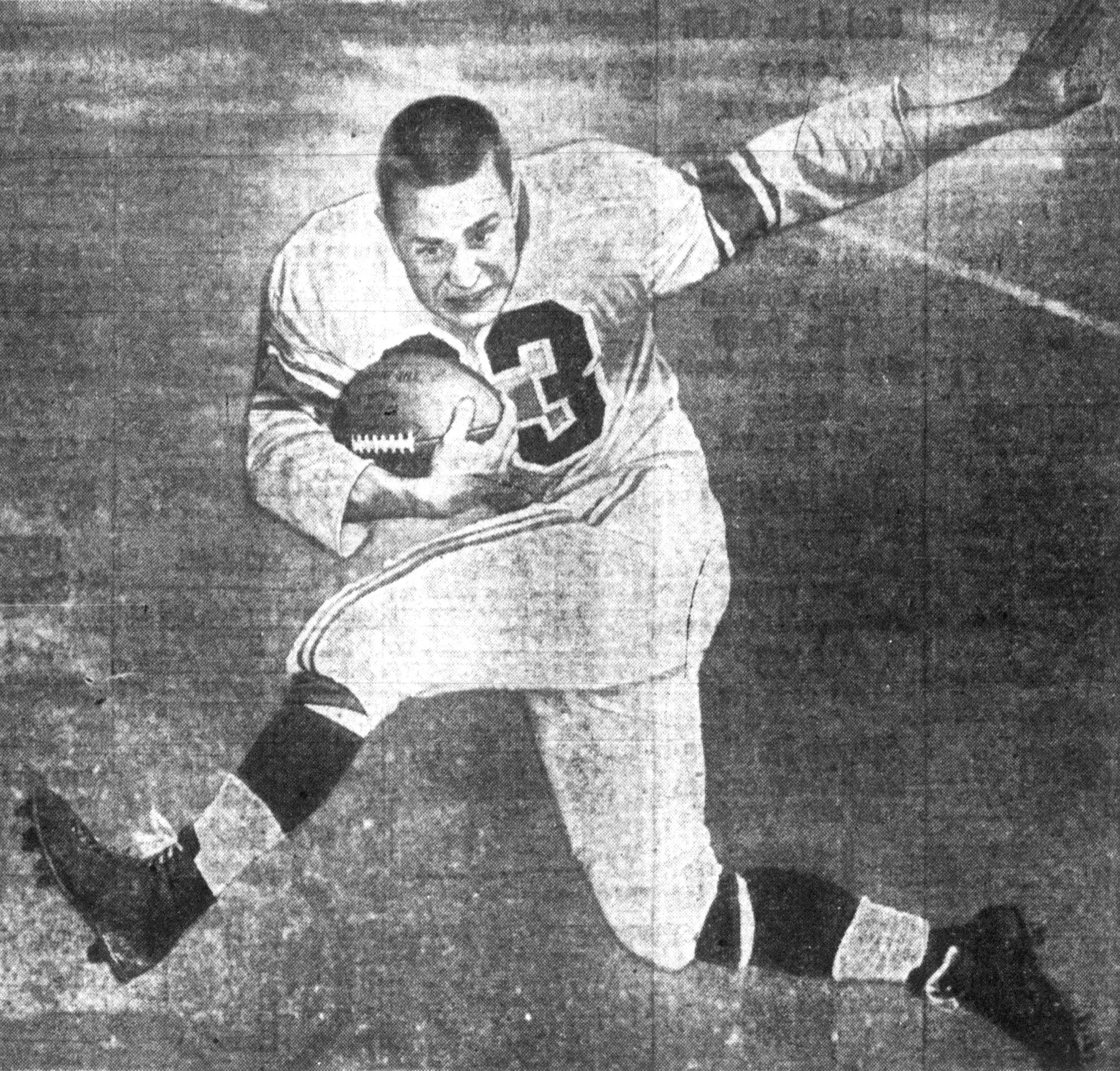

No. 23, 43, 85
- Position: Halfback

Personal information
- Born: May 16, 1930; Waco, Texas, U.S.
- Died: September 20, 2012 (aged 82); Flippin, Arkansas, U.S.
- Listed height: 5 ft 11 in (1.80 m)
- Listed weight: 185 lb (84 kg)

Career information
- High school: San Francisco Polytechnic (San Francisco, California)
- College: Pacific (CA) (1950–1952)
- NFL draft: 1952: 8th round, 97th overall pick

Career history

Playing
- Los Angeles Rams (1953–1955); San Francisco 49ers (1956); Toronto Argonauts (1957)

Coaching
- Minnesota Vikings (1963–1966) Offensive backs coach; Green Bay Packers (1967–1968) Offensive backs coach

Awards and highlights
- Second-team All-PCC (1952)

Career NFL statistics
- Rushing yards: 272
- Rushing average: 3.2
- Receptions: 11
- Receiving yards: 129
- Total touchdowns: 1
- Stats at Pro Football Reference

Thomas Mike McCormick (May 16, 1930 – September 20, 2012) was an American professional football player and coach. He played professionally as a halfback in the National Football League (NFL) for the Los Angeles Rams and San Francisco 49ers. He played college football at the University of Pacific.

McCormick was drafted by the Los Angeles Rams in the eighth round (97th overall) of the 1952 NFL draft. He played three seasons for the Rams from 1953 to 1955. He then played for the San Francisco 49ers in 1956.

During his four-year career he played in 32 games and gained 272 yards rushing on 86 carries. He had one career touchdown. As a kick return man he gained 10 yards on 9 punt returns and 243 yards on 11 kickoff returns for the Rams and 49ers. He recovered four fumbles during his professional career.

McCormick was as an assistant coach under Norm Van Brocklin with the Minnesota Vikings and under Vince Lombardi for the Super Bowl Champion Green Bay Packers.
