= Dick Horn =

American football player (1930–2022)

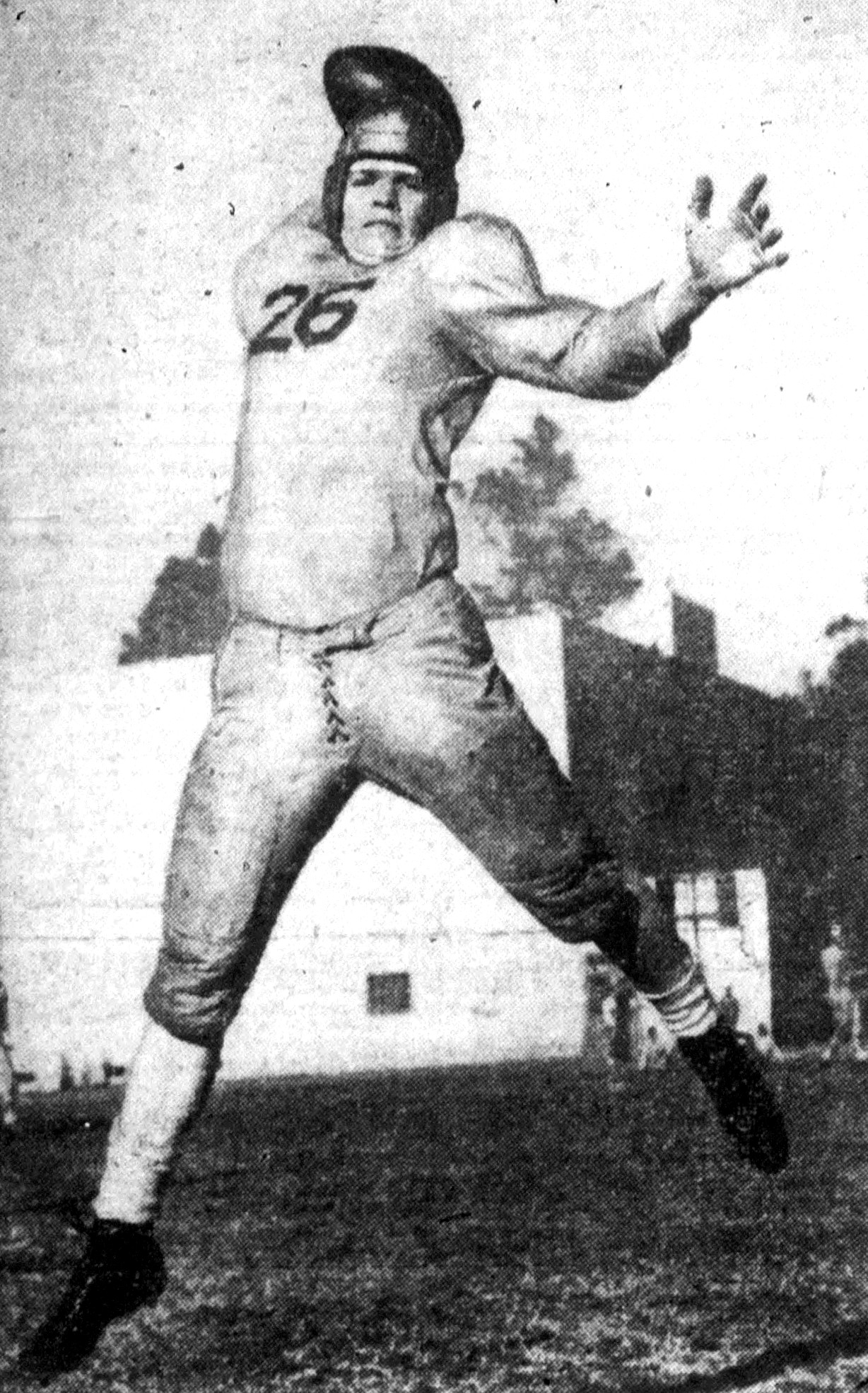
- Horn, circa 1947

No. 18
- Position: Quarterback

Personal information
- Born: March 18, 1930; Santa Monica, California, U.S.
- Died: October 22, 2022 (aged 92); Palo Alto, California, U.S.
- Listed height: 6 ft 1 in (1.85 m)
- Listed weight: 195 lb (88 kg)

Career information
- High school: Santa Monica
- College: Stanford (1948–1951)
- NFL draft: 1952: 17th round, 197th overall pick

Career history
- New York Yanks (1952)*; Baltimore Colts (1958)
- * Offseason or practice squad member only

Awards and highlights
- NFL champion (1958)

Career NFL statistics
- Punts: 19
- Punting yards: 617
- Longest punt: 48
- Stats at Pro Football Reference

Richard Henry Horn (March 18, 1930 – October 22, 2022) was a professional American football quarterback in the National Football League (NFL). He played one season with the Baltimore Colts in 1958.

Horn played safety and was the backup quarterback for Stanford. He completed Stanford Medical School in 1959.

Horn died on October 22, 2022, at the age of 92.
