= Marv McFadden =

American football player (1930–2007)

No. 64, 61
- Position: Guard

Personal information
- Born: January 18, 1930; Columbus City, Iowa, U.S.
- Died: December 22, 2007 (aged 77); Venice, Florida, U.S.
- Listed height: 6 ft 0 in (1.83 m)
- Listed weight: 223 lb (101 kg)

Career information
- High school: Eastern (Lansing, Michigan)
- College: Michigan State
- NFL draft: 1952: 12th round, 138th overall pick

Career history
- Pittsburgh Steelers (1953, 1956)

Career NFL statistics
- Games played: 24
- Games started: 22
- Fumble recoveries: 1
- Stats at Pro Football Reference

Marvin Gene McFadden (January 18, 1930 – December 22, 2007) was an American professional football player. He played college football as a tackle for the Michigan State Spartans (1950–1951) and professional football as a guard for the Pittsburgh Steelers (1953, 1956).

== Early life ==
McFadden was born in Columbus City, Iowa, in 1930. He attended Eastern High School in Lansing, Michigan. He played guard for the football team in high school and won all-conference honors.

== Michigan State ==
He played college football at the tackle position for the Michigan State Spartans in 1950 and 1951. His blocking was a key to the rush offense of the undefeated 1951 Michigan State team that was recognized as national champion. He majored in physical education and was a member of the ROTC program at Michigan State.

== Pittsburgh Steelers ==
He also played professional football in the National Football League for the Pittsburgh Steelers in 1953 and 1956. His professional football career was interrupted by two years of military service as a lieutenant with the U.S. Army in Germany. He was a player-coach for the 36th Field Artillery football team while in Germany. After completing his military service, McFadden won a spot as a starter at guard with the Steelers. He appeared in a total of 24 NFL games, 22 of them as a starter.

== Later life ==
McFadden was hired in January 1957 to work in the Michigan State Spartans business office. He was initially assigned as assistant to the ticket sales manager. He died in 2007 at Venice, Florida.
