= Gordon Cooper (American football) =

American football player and coach (1930–2022)

- Cooper during his playing career, c. 1949–1951

No. 99
- Position: End

Personal information
- Born: April 1, 1930; McGill, Nevada, U.S.
- Died: March 15, 2022 (aged 91); Rifle, Colorado, U.S.
- Listed height: 6 ft 2 in (1.88 m)
- Listed weight: 200 lb (91 kg)

Career information
- High school: White Pine (Ely, Nevada)
- College: Denver (1948–1951)
- NFL draft: 1952: 6th round, 69th overall pick

Career history

Playing
- Detroit Lions (1952, 1954)*; Montreal Alouettes (1955)*
- * Offseason or practice squad member only

Coaching
- Denver (1955) Freshman ends coach; Rifle High School (1956–1987) Football, baseball, wrestling, and track coach

Awards and highlights
- National receptions leader (1950); 3× First-team All-Skyline Conference (1949–1951); University of Denver Athletic Hall of Fame (2010)

Gordon Roger Cooper (April 1, 1930 – March 15, 2022) was an American college football player and sports coach. He played collegiately for the Denver Pioneers as an end, where he was the national receptions leader in 1950, and later was selected by the Detroit Lions in the sixth round of the 1952 NFL draft. He was drafted to serve in the United States Army prior to the 1952 NFL season and suffered an injury when he returned to the team in 1954. After a brief stint with the Montreal Alouettes in 1955, he retired from playing and began a long career as a coach, starting with his alma mater, Denver, and then with Rifle High School from 1956 to 1987, where he coached multiple sports and was athletic director. He was inducted into the University of Denver Athletic Hall of Fame in 2010.

== Early life ==
Cooper was born on April 1, 1930, in McGill, Nevada. He grew up playing multiple sports there and in Ely, both small towns in the desert of White Pine County. He attended White Pine High School in Ely where he was a standout football, basketball and track and field athlete; he also played baseball in American Legion leagues as White Pine had no varsity team. As a senior, he was selected all-state in football and the most outstanding member of the track and field team.

In 1948, when Cooper graduated from White Pine at the age of 18, he received an offer to play minor league baseball for the Cincinnati Reds. Shortly after, he received an offer to play college football and baseball for the University of Denver, and choose that route instead of joining the Reds. He received the Denver offer after a local sportswriter informed coach Johnny Baker of a "speedy kid with glue-like hands wrecking havoc in the desert."

== College career ==
Cooper attended the University of Denver from 1948 to 1951. He won nine varsity letters while playing three sports, as an end in football, shortstop in baseball and a participant in the javelin throw for the track and field team. In three years on the football team, he and quarterback Sam Etcheverry formed one of the nation's top passing duos, with each of Cooper's receiving yards totals placing in the top three in school history. Coach Baker described him as the best receiver he had ever seen, and the Associated Press (AP) published a report stating him to be such an outstanding player that "the adjective supply [was] exhausted" in trying to describe him.

Cooper was chosen first-team All-Skyline Conference in all three seasons at Denver. He caught 36 passes for 607 yards and three touchdowns during his sophomore season, 1949, and then followed it up by being the nation's leader in receptions in 1950 with 46 catches for 596 yards and eight touchdowns. As a senior in 1951, he broke Art Weiner's national record for career receptions. He ended his collegiate career with 113 receptions for 1,577 yards and 18 touchdowns, all Denver records that were never broken (the team was discontinued in 1960). He graduated from Denver with a degree in physical education.

== Professional career ==
Cooper was selected in the sixth round (69th overall) of the 1952 NFL draft by the Detroit Lions. He appeared in three exhibition games and was considered, according to Cooper, as one of the fastest members of the team. He said that he "was sure [he] would have made the team," but was drafted into the United States Army prior to the regular season and served 21 months, including 16 overseas in Germany. While in the Army, he continued playing football and was a member of the U.S. All-Service team in 1953. Cooper was released early from the Army to re-join the Lions in 1954, but he had suffered a knee injury during his military service that resulted in him losing his speed. He missed the regular season due to the injury and was not re-signed for the 1955 season. He signed to play in Canada for the Montreal Alouettes in March 1955, but did not make the team.

== Later life and death ==
Cooper retired from football after his stint with the Alouettes and returned to the University of Denver, receiving a master's degree in secondary education while coaching the ends for the freshman football team. He moved to Rifle, Colorado, in 1956, to serve as a physical education teacher at Rifle High School, also becoming the football and track and field coach, later adding the duty of athletic director. He also founded the school's baseball team and wrestling program and coached both of them as well.

Cooper served with the school for 31 years, retiring in 1987. With the football team, he won six conference championships and the state championship twice – in 1961 and 1973. He led the baseball team to their only state championships in 1981 and 1985 and totaled over 200 wins, with eight league championships. He also coached a championship track team in 1963 and helped three wrestlers to top placements at state tournaments. He was named the state's Coach of the Year in baseball three times (1981, 1984, 1986) and once in football (1973). He was inducted into the University of Denver Athletic Hall of Fame in 2010, into the Colorado Dugout Club Coaches Association Hall of Fame in 2020, and the baseball field at Rifle High School was named Gordon Cooper Field in his honor.

Cooper also was a volunteer for the Rifle Fire Department from 1959 to 1979. He was married and had two sons. Cooper died on March 15, 2022, at the age of 91.

== See also ==
- List of NCAA major college football yearly receiving leaders
