= Don Menasco =

American football player (1929–1998)

No. 38, 27
- Position: Defensive back

Personal information
- Born: October 11, 1929; Howard County, Texas, U.S.
- Died: May 5, 1998 (aged 68); Biloxi, Mississippi, U.S.
- Listed height: 6 ft 0 in (1.83 m)
- Listed weight: 185 lb (84 kg)

Career information
- High school: Longview (Longview, Texas)
- College: Texas
- NFL draft: 1952: 4th round, 47th overall pick

Career history
- New York Giants (1952–1953); Philadelphia Eagles (1954)*; Washington Redskins (1954)
- * Offseason or practice squad member only

Awards and highlights
- First-team All-American (1950)

Career NFL statistics
- Interceptions: 5
- Stats at Pro Football Reference

Donald Dean Menasco (October 18, 1929 – May 11, 1998) was an American professional football defensive back in the National Football League (NFL) for the New York Giants and Washington Redskins. He played college football at the University of Texas and was selected by the Giants in the fourth round of the 1952 NFL draft, where he wore #38 in the 1952-53 season.
