= Burrell Shields =

American football player (1929–1997)

No. 37, 31
- Position: Halfback

Personal information
- Born: September 6, 1929; Cleveland, Ohio, U.S.
- Died: January 15, 1997 (aged 67); Cleveland, Ohio, U.S.
- Listed height: 6 ft 2 in (1.88 m)
- Listed weight: 203 lb (92 kg)

Career information
- High school: East Tech (Cleveland)
- College: John Carroll (1948–1951)
- NFL draft: 1952: 6th round, 72nd overall pick

Career history
- Pittsburgh Steelers (1954); Baltimore Colts (1955)

Career NFL statistics
- Rushing yards: 62
- Rushing average: 3.6
- Receptions: 4
- Receiving yards: 49
- Stats at Pro Football Reference

Burrell Shields (September 6, 1929 – January 15, 1997) was an American professional football halfback. He played for the Pittsburgh Steelers in 1954 and for the Baltimore Colts in 1955.
