= Bill Hegarty =

American football player (1931–2002)

No. 76, 79
- Positions: Defensive end, Tackle

Personal information
- Born: June 30, 1931; Medford, Massachusetts, U.S.
- Died: October 31, 2002 (aged 71)
- Listed height: 6 ft 4 in (1.93 m)
- Listed weight: 240 lb (109 kg)

Career information
- High school: Medford; Aquinas Institute (Rochester, New York)
- College: Georgia; Villanova (1951–1952)
- NFL draft: 1952: 15th round, 181st overall pick

Career history
- Pittsburgh Steelers (1953); Washington Redskins (1953)

Career NFL statistics
- Games played: 3
- Stats at Pro Football Reference

William Michael Hegarty (June 30, 1931 – October 31, 2002) was an American professional football offensive tackle in the National Football League (NFL) for the Pittsburgh Steelers and Washington Redskins. He played college football at the University of Georgia and Villanova University and was selected by the Los Angeles Rams in the fifteenth round of the 1952 NFL draft. Hegarty died on October 31, 2002, at the age of 71.
