= Dick Doyle (American football) =

American football player (1930–2003)

Richard Doyle
No. 41, 14, 15
- Position: Defensive back

Personal information
- Born: March 26, 1930; Cambridge, Maryland, U.S.
- Died: April 7, 2003 (aged 73)
- Listed height: 6 ft 3 in (1.91 m)
- Listed weight: 193 lb (88 kg)

Career information
- High school: Rochester (Rochester, Pennsylvania)
- College: Ohio State (1949–1950, 1952)
- NFL draft: 1952: 27th round, 318th overall pick

Career history
- Pittsburgh Steelers (1955); Denver Broncos (1960)

Awards and highlights
- Rose Bowl champion (1950)

Career NFL/AFL statistics
- Games played: 18
- Games started: 1
- Interceptions: 2
- Interception yards: 28
- Stats at Pro Football Reference

Richard Albert Doyle (March 26, 1930 – April 7, 2003) was an American professional football defensive back who played two seasons for two different teams, the Pittsburgh Steelers and the Denver Broncos of the AFL and National Football League (NFL). He was drafted by the Steelers in the 27th round with the 318th overall pick of the 1952 NFL draft. He played college football at Ohio State University for the Ohio State Buckeyes football team.
