= Ted Daffer =

American football player (1929–2006)

No. 64, 62
- Positions: Guard, defensive end

Personal information
- Born: September 24, 1929; Norfolk, Virginia, U.S.
- Died: March 1, 2006 (aged 76); Atlanta, Georgia, U.S.
- Listed height: 6 ft 0 in (1.83 m)
- Listed weight: 198 lb (90 kg)

Career information
- High school: Maury (Norfolk)
- College: Tennessee (1948–1951)
- NFL draft: 1952: 21st round, 248th overall pick

Career history
- Chicago Bears (1954); Ottawa Rough Riders (1955)

Awards and highlights
- National champion (1951); 2× First-team All-American (1950, 1951); 2× First-team All-SEC (1950, 1951)

Career NFL statistics
- Fumble recoveries: 1
- Stats at Pro Football Reference

Terrell Edwin "Ted" Daffer (September 24, 1929 – March 1, 2006) was an American professional football player. He played college football for the Tennessee Volunteers football team at the guard position from 1949 to 1951. He was selected by the American Football Coaches Association (AFCA), Associated Press (AP), Football Writers Association of America (FWAA) and the International News Service (INS) as a first-team guard on the 1950 College Football All-America Team. The following year, he was again selected by the INS and the Newspaper Enterprise Association as a first-team player on the 1951 All-America Team. Daffer was selected 248th overall by the Chicago Bears in the 21st round of the 1952 NFL draft. After two years of service in the United States Army, he played for the Bears during the 1954 NFL season. In 1955, he later played for the Ottawa Rough Riders in the Canadian Football League (CFL).
