= Joe Dean Davenport =

American football player (born 1976)

No. 80
- Position: Tight end

Personal information
- Born: October 29, 1976 (age 50); Springdale, Arkansas, U.S.
- Listed height: 6 ft 6 in (1.98 m)
- Listed weight: 268 lb (122 kg)

Career information
- High school: Springdale
- College: Arkansas
- NFL draft: 2000: undrafted

Career history
- San Francisco 49ers (2000)*; Indianapolis Colts (2001–2003); Washington Redskins (2004)*
- * Offseason or practice squad member only

Awards and highlights
- Second-team All-SEC (1999); SEC West Division champion, 1998; 2000 Cotton Bowl Classic champion

Career NFL statistics
- Receptions: 11
- Yards: 93
- Touchdowns: 0
- Stats at Pro Football Reference

Joe Dean Davenport II (born October 29, 1976) is an American former professional football player who was a tight end for the Indianapolis Colts of the National Football League (NFL) from 2001 to 2003. He played college football for the Arkansas Razorbacks.
