= Bob Dees =

American football player (1929–1997)

No. 76
- Positions: Defensive tackle, offensive tackle

Personal information
- Born: September 26, 1929; St. Louis, Missouri, U.S.
- Died: July 5, 1997 (aged 67); Penn Valley, California, U.S.
- Listed height: 6 ft 4 in (1.93 m)
- Listed weight: 245 lb (111 kg)

Career information
- High school: Southwest (St. Louis)
- College: Southwest Missouri State (1948–1951)
- NFL draft: 1952: 18th round, 217th overall pick

Career history
- Los Angeles Rams (1952)*; Green Bay Packers (1952)
- * Offseason or practice squad member only

Career NFL statistics
- Games played: 9
- Games started: 2
- Stats at Pro Football Reference

Robert Leslie Dees (September 26, 1929 – July 5, 1997) was an American professional football defensive tackle in the National Football League (NFL) who played for the Green Bay Packers. Dees played collegiate ball for Southwest Missouri State University before being selected 217th overall by the Los Angeles Rams in the 18th round of the 1952 NFL draft. He played in the NFL for one season, in 1952.
