= Steve Dowden =

American football player (1929–2001)

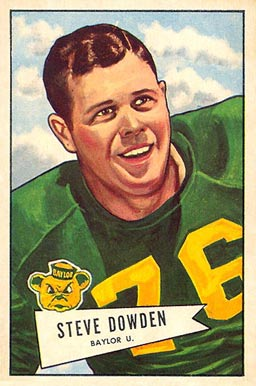
- Dowden on a 1952 Bowman football card

No. 70
- Position: Offensive tackle

Personal information
- Born: February 14, 1929; Natchitoches, Louisiana, U.S.
- Died: January 24, 2001 (aged 71); Spring, Texas, U.S.
- Listed height: 6 ft 4 in (1.93 m)
- Listed weight: 205 lb (93 kg)

Career information
- High school: Odessa (Odessa, Texas)
- College: Baylor
- NFL draft: 1952: 10th round, 117th overall pick

Career history
- Green Bay Packers (1952)

Career NFL statistics
- Games played: 12
- Games started: 12
- Stats at Pro Football Reference

Stephen Henry Dowden (February 24, 1929 – January 24, 2001) was an American professional football player who was a tackle for the Green Bay Packers of the National Football League (NFL). Dowden was born in 1929 in Natchitoches, Louisiana, and played college football for the Baylor Bears. He was selected 117th overall by the Detroit Lions in the 10th round of the 1952 NFL draft and played that season with Green Bay.
