= Jack Hoffman (American football) =

American football player (1930–2001)

No. 82
- Position: Defensive end

Personal information
- Born: March 11, 1930; Cincinnati, Ohio, U.S.
- Died: December 13, 2001 (aged 71); Cincinnati, Ohio, U.S.
- Listed height: 6 ft 5 in (1.96 m)
- Listed weight: 234 lb (106 kg)

Career information
- High school: Purcell Marian (Cincinnati)
- College: Xavier
- NFL draft: 1952: 5th round, 54th overall pick

Career history
- Chicago Bears (1952, 1955–1958)

Career NFL statistics
- Fumble recoveries: 5
- Interceptions: 2
- Receptions: 6
- Receiving yards: 86
- Stats at Pro Football Reference

Jack Howard Hoffman (March 11, 1930 – December 13, 2001) was an American professional football defensive end who played five seasons with the Chicago Bears of the National Football League (NFL). He was selected by the Bears in the fifth round of the 1952 NFL draft after playing college football at Xavier University.

== Early life and college ==
Jack Howard Hoffman was born on March 11, 1930, in Cincinnati, Ohio. He graduated from Purcell Marian High School in Cincinnati in 1948.

Hoffman played college football at Xavier University, where he graduated with a bachelor's degree in business in 1952.

== Professional career ==
Hoffman was selected by the Chicago Bears in the fifth round, with the 54th overall pick, of the 1952 NFL draft. Hoffman started all 12 games during his rookie year. He missed the 1953 and 1954 seasons while serving in the United States Army during the Korean War era. A stalwart on the Bears defensive line, he started 43 consecutive games from 1955 to 1958 until dislocating his elbow against the Green Bay Packers in 1958, leading to his retirement. He was an offensive end as well in 1955, catching six passes for 86 yards that year.

== Personal life ==
Hoffman later became a car salesman in Cincinnati, with son Jack Jr. doing the same.
