= Zippy Morocco =

American basketball player (1930–2016)

Anthony Joseph "Zippy" Morocco (March 10, 1930 – April 24, 2016) was an American two-sport athlete at the University of Georgia (UGA). From Youngstown, Ohio, Morocco played point guard for the school's basketball team and was the tailback for the school's football team. Morocco was an All-American in basketball and a record-setting tailback for the football team. Morocco holds the third-best record for yards gained on punt returns at 14.2 in UGA's record book. Morocco also averaged ten yards a carry and was called "the best pass-receiving back I've ever coached" by head coach Wally Butts.

Morocco was drafted by the Philadelphia Eagles in 1951, but returned to UGA to play basketball, where he flourished on the court. In 1951 Morocco scored 590 points and lead the league in scoring while setting the single-season scoring record. Morocco holds the school record for free-throw shooting percentage in a single game, and the school record for free-throw shooting percentage in a single season. After the season Morocco was named the SEC's most valuable player and an All-American. He signed a contract with the Montreal Alouettes in May 1953. Morocco's athletic career ended after a hamstring injury he obtained while serving in the United States military.

Morocco owned a highly successful real estate business in Athens, Georgia, after his college career. Morocco was inducted into the UGA Ring of Honor in 2002. Morocco committed suicide on April 24, 2016, after battling cancer and depression.
