= 1952 NFL draft =

National Football League draft

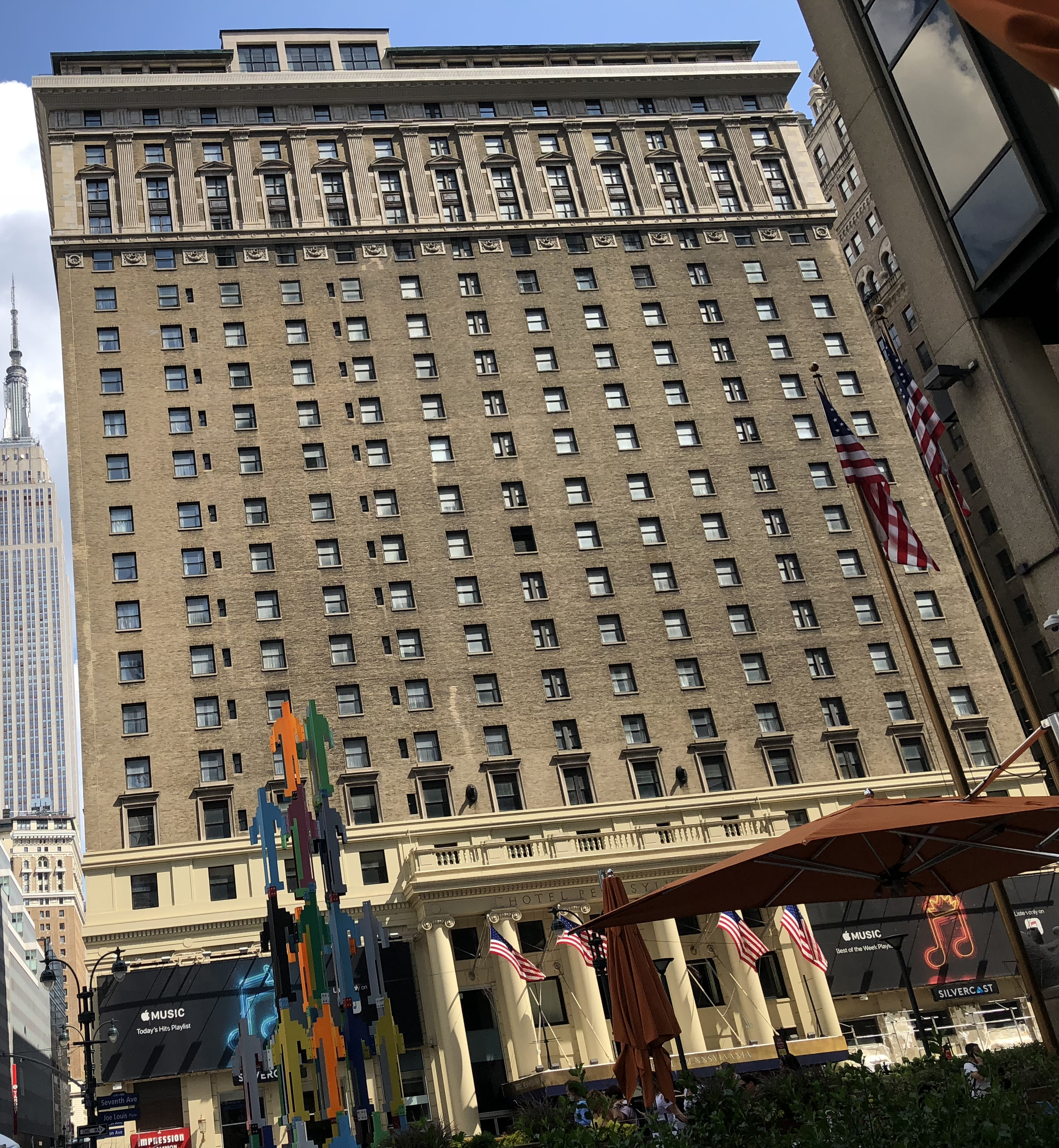
- The former Hotel Statler (location of the draft), photographed in 2018

General information
- Date: January 17, 1952
- Location: Hotel Statler in New York City

Overview
- 360 total selections in 30 rounds
- League: NFL
- First selection: Bill Wade, QB; Los Angeles Rams
- Most selections (36): Cleveland Browns
- Fewest selections (27): Detroit Lions
- Hall of Famers: 9: LB Les Richter; HB Ollie Matson; HB Hugh McElhenny; HB Frank Gifford; DE Gino Marchetti; S Bobby Dillon; S Yale Lary; OT George Young; CB Night Train Lane

The 1952 NFL draft was held on January 17, 1952, at Hotel Statler in New York. Selections made by New York Yanks were assigned to the new Dallas Texans.

This was the sixth year that the first overall pick was a bonus pick determined by lottery, with the previous five winners (Chicago Bears in 1947, Washington Redskins in 1948, Philadelphia Eagles in 1949, Detroit Lions in 1950, and New York Giants in 1951) ineligible from the draw; it was won by the Los Angeles Rams, who selected quarterback Bill Wade.

The Washington Post sportswriter Mo Siegel later claimed that Washington Redskins owner George Preston Marshall let him choose a late-round pick. Siegel, he said, chose Tennessee Tech's Flavious Smith to force the first black player onto the all-white Redskins. If true, Marshall likely persuaded NFL Commissioner Bert Bell to remove the choice from the official records. (Smith, who did not hear the story until years later, was white.)

== Player selections ==
= Pro Bowler	= Hall of Famer

=== Round 1 ===
Pick #	NFL team	Player	Position	College
1	Los Angeles Rams ^{(Lottery bonus pick)}	Bill Wade	Quarterback	Vanderbilt
2	New York Yanks	Les Richter	Guard	California
3	Chicago Cardinals	Ollie Matson	Halfback	San Francisco
4	Green Bay Packers	Babe Parilli	Quarterback	Kentucky
5	Philadelphia Eagles	Johnny Bright	Back	Drake
6	Pittsburgh Steelers	Ed Modzelewski	Fullback	Maryland
7	Washington Redskins	Larry Isbell	Back	Baylor
8	Chicago Bears	Jim Dooley	Back	Miami (FL)
9	San Francisco 49ers	Hugh McElhenny	Halfback	Washington
10	Cleveland Browns ^{(From Detroit Lions)}	Bert Rechichar	Back	Tennessee
11	New York Giants	Frank Gifford	Halfback	USC
12	Cleveland Browns	Harry Agganis	Quarterback	Boston University
13	Los Angeles Rams	Bob Carey	End	Michigan State

=== Round 2 ===
Pick #	NFL team	Player	Position	College
14	New York Yanks	Gino Marchetti	Defensive end	San Francisco
15	Green Bay Packers	Billy Howton	End	Rice
16	Chicago Cardinals	Johnny Karras	Back	Illinois
17	Philadelphia Eagles	Jim Weatherall	Tackle	Oklahoma
18	Pittsburgh Steelers	George Tarasovic	Center	LSU
19	Washington Redskins	Andy Davis	Back	George Washington
20	Chicago Bears	Eddie Macon	Back	Pacific
21	Chicago Cardinals	Pete Brewster	End	Purdue
22	San Francisco 49ers	Bob Toneff	Tackle	Notre Dame
23	New York Giants	Ray Beck	Guard	Georgia Tech
24	Cleveland Browns	Bill Hughes	Center	Michigan State
25	Los Angeles Rams	Bob Griffin	Tackle	Arkansas

=== Round 3 ===
Pick #	NFL team	Player	Position	College
26	Cleveland Browns	Don Klosterman	Quarterback	Loyola (CA)
27	San Francisco 49ers	Gene Shannon	Back	Houston
28	Green Bay Packers	Bobby Dillon	Back	Texas
29	Philadelphia Eagles	Lum Snyder	Tackle	Georgia Tech
30	Pittsburgh Steelers	Steve Wadiak	Back	South Carolina
31	Washington Redskins	Al Dorow	Quarterback	Michigan State
32	Chicago Bears	Bill McColl	End	Stanford
33	San Francisco 49ers	Billy Tidwell	Back	Texas A&M
34	Detroit Lions	Yale Lary	Safety	Texas A&M
35	New York Giants	Don Heinrich	Quarterback	Washington
36	Cleveland Browns	Joe Campanella	Tackle	Ohio State
37	Los Angeles Rams	Dewey McConnell	End	Wyoming

=== Round 4 ===
Pick #	NFL team	Player	Position	College
38	New York Giants	Merwin Hodel	Back	Colorado
39	Cleveland Browns	Elmer Costa	Guard	NC State
40	Los Angeles Rams	Ken Casner	Tackle	Baylor
41	Philadelphia Eagles	Chuck Ulrich	Tackle	Illinois
42	Pittsburgh Steelers	Jack Gearding	Tackle	Xavier
43	Washington Redskins	Dick Hightower	Center	SMU
44	Chicago Bears	Herman Clark	Tackle	Oregon State
45	Detroit Lions	Pat Summerall	Kicker	Arkansas
46	San Francisco 49ers	Marion Campbell	Tackle	Georgia
47	New York Giants	Don Menasco	End	Texas
48	Cleveland Browns	Ray Renfro	Back	North Texas State
49	Los Angeles Rams	Skeets Quinlan	Back	San Diego State

=== Round 5 ===
Pick #	NFL team	Player	Position	College
50	New York Yanks	Jack Jorgenson	Tackle	Colorado
51	Chicago Cardinals	Dick Fugler	Tackle	Tulane
52	Green Bay Packers	Dave Hanner	Tackle	Arkansas
53	New York Yanks	Mel Sinquefield	Center	Ole Miss
54	Chicago Bears	Jack Hoffman	End	Xavier
55	Washington Redskins	Jim Clark	Guard	Oregon State
56	Chicago Bears	Fred Williams	Tackle	Arkansas
57	San Francisco 49ers	Pat O'Donahue	End	Wisconsin
58	Detroit Lions	Bob Miller	Tackle	Virginia
59	New York Giants	Bob Patton	Tackle	Clemson
60	Cleveland Browns	Keever Jankovich	End	Pacific
61	Los Angeles Rams	Gordon Polofsky	Back	Tennessee

=== Round 6 ===
Pick #	NFL team	Player	Position	College
62	New York Yanks	Dave Cianelli	Center	Maryland
63	Green Bay Packers	Tom Johnson	Tackle	Michigan
64	Chicago Cardinals	John Hancock	Guard	Baylor
65	Philadelphia Eagles	Dick Lemmon	Back	California
66	Los Angeles Rams	Duane Putnam	Guard	Pacific
67	Washington Redskins	Ed Kensler	Guard	Maryland
68	Chicago Bears	Ed Brown	Back	San Francisco
69	Detroit Lions	Gordon Cooper	End	Denver
70	San Francisco 49ers	Jim Beasley	Center	Tulsa
71	New York Giants	Jim MacKenzie	Tackle	Kentucky
72	Cleveland Browns	Burrell Shields	Back	John Carroll
73	Los Angeles Rams	Jerrell Price	Tackle	Texas Tech

=== Round 7 ===
Pick #	NFL team	Player	Position	College
74	New York Yanks	John Petitbon	Back	Notre Dame
75	Chicago Cardinals	Harry Jabbusch	Center	South Carolina
76	Green Bay Packers	Bill Reichardt	Back	Iowa
77	Philadelphia Eagles	John Thomas	End	Oregon State
78	Pittsburgh Steelers	Claude Hipps	Back	Georgia
79	Washington Redskins	Vic Janowicz	Halfback	Ohio State
80	Chicago Bears	Joe Fortunato	Back	Mississippi State
81	San Francisco 49ers	Don Robison	Back	California
82	Detroit Lions	Wes Gardner	Center	Utah
83	New York Giants	Val Joe Walker	Back	SMU
84	Cleveland Browns	John Pace	Tackle	Mississippi State
85	Los Angeles Rams	Burt Delavan	Tackle	Pacific

=== Round 8 ===
Pick #	NFL team	Player	Position	College
86	Cleveland Browns	Stan Williams	End	Baylor
87	Green Bay Packers	Mel Becket	Center	Indiana
88	Chicago Cardinals	Don Coleman	Tackle	Michigan State
89	Philadelphia Eagles	Wayne Robinson	Center	Minnesota
90	Chicago Bears	Bill Bishop	Tackle	North Texas State
91	Washington Redskins	Hubert Johnston	Tackle	Iowa
92	Chicago Bears	Billy Jurney	End	Arkansas
93	Detroit Lions	Tom Dublinski	Back	Utah
94	San Francisco 49ers	Jerry Smith	Tackle	Wisconsin
95	New York Giants	Billy Shipp	Tackle	Alabama
96	Cleveland Browns	Herschel Forester	Guard	SMU
97	Los Angeles Rams	Tom McCormick	Back	Pacific

=== Round 9 ===
Pick #	NFL team	Player	Position	College
98	New York Yanks	Jim Lansford	Tackle	Texas
99	Chicago Cardinals	Malcolm Cook	Back	Georgia
100	Green Bay Packers	Deral Teteak	Guard	Wisconsin
101	Philadelphia Eagles	Maury Nipp	Guard	Loyola (CA)
102	Pittsburgh Steelers	Herky Payne	Back	Tennessee
103	Washington Redskins	Dick Alban	Safety	Northwestern
104	Chicago Bears	Bobby Cross	Tackle	Stephen F. Austin
105	San Francisco 49ers	Glen Christian	Back	Idaho
106	Detroit Lions	Sonny Gandee	End	Ohio State
107	New York Giants	John Kastan	Back	Boston University
108	Cleveland Browns	Bob Finnell	Back	Xavier
109	Los Angeles Rams	Byron Townsend	Back	Texas

=== Round 10 ===
Pick #	NFL team	Player	Position	College
110	New York Yanks	Jim Hammond	Back	Wisconsin
111	Green Bay Packers	Art Kleinschmidt	Guard	Tulane
112	Chicago Cardinals	John Feltch	Tackle	Holy Cross
113	Philadelphia Eagles	Gerry McGinley	Guard	Penn
114	Pittsburgh Steelers	George Gilmartin	Back	Xavier
115	Washington Redskins	Chet Ostrowski	End	Notre Dame
116	Green Bay Packers	William Roffler	Back	Washington State
117	Detroit Lions	Steve Dowden	Tackle	Baylor
118	San Francisco 49ers	Carl West	Back	Ole Miss
119	New York Giants	Pat Knight	End	SMU
120	Cleveland Browns	Pat Ribiero	Tackle	Pacific
121	Los Angeles Rams	Luke Welch	Tackle	Baylor

=== Round 11 ===
Pick #	NFL team	Player	Position	College
122	New York Yanks	Pat Cannamela	Guard	USC
123	Chicago Cardinals	Leo Sugar	End	Purdue
124	Green Bay Packers	Billy Burkhalter	Back	Rice
125	Philadelphia Eagles	Ralph Goldston	Back	Youngstown
126	Pittsburgh Steelers	Jack Spinks	Back	Alcorn A&M
127	Washington Redskins	Orlando Mazza	End	Michigan State
128	Chicago Bears	Bill Miller	Back	Wake Forest
129	San Francisco 49ers	J. D. Kimmel	Tackle	Houston
130	Detroit Lions	Keith Flowers	Center	TCU
131	New York Giants	Charlie Harris	Center	California
132	Cleveland Browns	Dick Logan	Tackle	Ohio State
133	Los Angeles Rams	Sam Baker	Back	Oregon State

=== Round 12 ===
Pick #	NFL team	Player	Position	College
134	New York Yanks	Jim Mutscheller	End	Notre Dame
135	Green Bay Packers	Bill Wilson	Tackle	Texas
136	Chicago Cardinals	Joe Masnaghetti	Tackle	Marquette
137	Philadelphia Eagles	Jack Blount	Tackle	Mississippi State
138	Pittsburgh Steelers	Marv McFadden	Tackle	Michigan State
139	Washington Redskins	Frank Middendorf	Center	Cincinnati
140	Chicago Bears	Andy Kozar	Back	Tennessee
141	Detroit Lions	Jim Roshto	Back	LSU
142	San Francisco 49ers	Fred Snyder	End	Loyola (CA)
143	New York Giants	Dick Ochoa	Back	Texas
144	Cleveland Browns	Roy Thompson	Back	Florida State
145	Los Angeles Rams	Jake Roberts	Back	Tulsa

=== Round 13 ===
Pick #	NFL team	Player	Position	College
146	New York Yanks	Bill Ward	Guard	Arkansas
147	Chicago Cardinals	Mel Massucco	Back	Holy Cross
148	Green Bay Packers	Billy Hair	Back	Clemson
149	Philadelphia Eagles	Ed Hamilton	Back	Kentucky
150	Pittsburgh Steelers	Dave Flood	Back	Notre Dame
151	Washington Redskins	Ray Potter	Tackle	LSU
152	Chicago Bears	Rich Athan	Back	Northwestern
153	San Francisco 49ers	Rudy Yeager	Tackle	LSU
154	Detroit Lions	Carroll McDonald	Center	Florida
155	New York Giants	Pat Brady	Back	Nevada
156	Cleveland Browns	Tom Cosgrove	Center	Maryland
157	Los Angeles Rams	Red Phillips	Center	Texas Tech

=== Round 14 ===
Pick #	NFL team	Player	Position	College
158	New York Yanks	Paul Williams	End	Texas
159	Green Bay Packers	Jack Morgan	Tackle	Michigan State
160	Chicago Cardinals	Tom Tofaute	Center	NC State
161	Philadelphia Eagles	Bob Stringer	Back	Tulsa
162	Pittsburgh Steelers	June Davis	Guard	Texas
163	Washington Redskins	Doug Conway	Tackle	TCU
164	Chicago Bears	Gale Galloway	Center	Baylor
165	Detroit Lions	Ray Oliverson	Back	BYU
166	San Francisco 49ers	Frank Simons	End	Nebraska
167	New York Giants	Hal Mitchell	Tackle	UCLA
168	Cleveland Browns	Steve Ruzich	Guard	Ohio State
169	Los Angeles Rams	Joe Moss	Tackle	Maryland

=== Round 15 ===
Pick #	NFL team	Player	Position	College
170	New York Yanks	Jack Bighead	End	Pepperdine
171	Chicago Cardinals	John Davis	Back	Indiana
172	Green Bay Packers	Bobby Jack Floyd	Back	TCU
173	Philadelphia Eagles	Malcolm Schmidt	End	Iowa State
174	Pittsburgh Steelers	Dick Pivirotto	Back	Princeton
175	Washington Redskins	Julius Wittman	Tackle	Ohio State
176	Chicago Bears	Dick Kazmaier	Halfback	Princeton
177	San Francisco 49ers	Haldo Norman	End	Gustavus Adolphus
178	Detroit Lions	John Burgamy	Guard	Georgia
179	New York Giants	Paul Bischoff	End	West Virginia
180	Cleveland Browns	Holly Alpin	End	Tampa
181	Los Angeles Rams	Bill Hegarty	Tackle	Villanova

=== Round 16 ===
Pick #	NFL team	Player	Position	College
182	New York Yanks	Vince Kaseta	End	Tennessee
183	Green Bay Packers	Johnny Coatta	Back	Wisconsin
184	Chicago Cardinals	Mike Mergen	Guard	San Francisco
185	Philadelphia Eagles	Jim Brewer	Guard	North Texas State
186	Pittsburgh Steelers	Pete Ladygo	Guard	Maryland
187	Washington Redskins	Marv Berschet	Tackle	Illinois
188	Chicago Bears	Bob Spears	Back	Yale
189	Cleveland Browns	Herb Neathery	Back	Illinois
190	San Francisco 49ers	Bob Meyers	Back	Stanford
191	New York Giants	Paul Burns	Guard	Notre Dame
192	Cleveland Browns	Ed Rowlands	Tackle	Oklahoma
193	Los Angeles Rams	Bob Hooks	End	USC

=== Round 17 ===
Pick #	NFL team	Player	Position	College
194	New York Yanks	Dick Horn	Back	Stanford
195	Chicago Cardinals	Darrell Crawford	Back	Georgia Tech
196	Green Bay Packers	Don Peterson	Back	Michigan
197	Philadelphia Eagles	John Weigle	End	Oklahoma A&M
198	Pittsburgh Steelers	Pat Smithwick	End	St. Norbert
199	Washington Redskins	Gil Bocetti	Back	Washington & Lee
200	Chicago Bears	John Carroll	Tackle	Houston
201	San Francisco 49ers	Al Baldock	End	USC
202	Detroit Lions	Hank Lauricella	Back	Tennessee
203	New York Giants	Bob Karpe	Tackle	California
204	Cleveland Browns	Stew Sheets	Tackle	Penn State
205	Los Angeles Rams	John Griggs	Center	Kentucky

=== Round 18 ===
Pick #	NFL team	Player	Position	College
206	New York Yanks	Les Molnar	Tackle	Buffalo
207	Green Bay Packers	Howard Tisdale	Tackle	Stephen F. Austin
208	Chicago Cardinals	Bill Pyron	Tackle	Mississippi State
209	Philadelphia Eagles	Ed Romanowski	Back	Scranton
210	Pittsburgh Steelers	Andy MacDonald	Back	Central Michigan
211	Washington Redskins	Ed Bartlett	End	California
212	Chicago Bears	Tommy O'Connell	Back	Illinois
213	Detroit Lions	Stan Campbell	Guard	Iowa State
214	San Francisco 49ers	Bill Carey	End	Michigan State
215	New York Giants	Gene Little	Guard	Rice
216	Cleveland Browns	Ken Mirich	Guard	Santa Clara
217	Los Angeles Rams	Bob Dees	Tackle	Southwest Missouri State

=== Round 19 ===
Pick #	NFL team	Player	Position	College
218	New York Yanks	Gene Felker	End	Wisconsin
219	Chicago Cardinals	Ed Listopad	Tackle	Wake Forest
220	Green Bay Packers	Johnny Pont	Back	Miami (OH)
221	Philadelphia Eagles	Talbott Trammell	End	Washington & Lee
222	Pittsburgh Steelers	Gary Kerkorian	Quarterback	Stanford
223	Washington Redskins	Joe Marvin	Back	UCLA
224	Chicago Bears	Ken Reidenbach	Tackle	Drake
225	Cleveland Browns	Sam Talarico	Tackle	Indiana
226	Detroit Lions	Blaine Earon	End	Duke
227	New York Giants	Frank Cahill	End	Northern Illinois State
228	Cleveland Browns	Mike Maccioli	Back	Purdue
229	Los Angeles Rams	Harry Geldien	Back	Wyoming

=== Round 20 ===
Pick #	NFL team	Player	Position	College
230	New York Yanks	John Adams	End	Texas
231	Green Bay Packers	Chuck Boerio	Center	Illinois
232	Chicago Cardinals	Frank Fischel	End	Arkansas
233	Philadelphia Eagles	Bob Blaik	Back	Colorado College
234	Pittsburgh Steelers	Dan Simeone	Tackle	Villanova
235	Washington Redskins	Roger Kinson	Center	Missouri
236	Chicago Bears	Jimmy Lesane	Back	Virginia
237	Detroit Lions	Gil Mains	Tackle	Murray State
238	San Francisco 49ers	Jess Yates	End	LSU
239	New York Giants	Rex Boggan	Tackle	Ole Miss
240	Cleveland Browns	Bob Brandenberry	Back	Kansas
241	Los Angeles Rams	Ed Weber	Back	William & Mary

=== Round 21 ===
Pick #	NFL team	Player	Position	College
242	New York Yanks	Harry Hugasian	Back	Stanford
243	Chicago Cardinals	Wade Musgrove	Guard	Hardin–Simmons
244	Green Bay Packers	Herb Zimmerman	Guard	TCU
245	Philadelphia Eagles	Les Wheeler	Tackle	Abilene Christian
246	Pittsburgh Steelers	Harry Babcock	End	Georgia
247	Washington Redskins	Dick Jenkins	Tackle	Illinois
248	Chicago Bears	Ted Daffer	Guard	Tennessee
249	San Francisco 49ers	Gene Offield	Center	Hardin–Simmons
250	Detroit Lions	Showboat Boykin	Back	Ole Miss
251	New York Giants	Jim Creamer	Center	Michigan State
252	Cleveland Browns	Dick Calhoun	Guard	Baylor
253	Los Angeles Rams	Art Preston	Back	San Diego State

=== Round 22 ===
Pick #	NFL team	Player	Position	College
254	New York Yanks	Dean Schneider	Back	USC
255	Green Bay Packers	Karl Kluckhohn	End	Colgate
256	Chicago Cardinals	Glenn Lippman	Back	Texas A&M
257	Philadelphia Eagles	Johnny Turco	Back	Holy Cross
258	Pittsburgh Steelers	Bob Byrne	Back	Montana State
259	Washington Redskins	Jim O'Rourke	Back	NC State
260	Chicago Bears	Dick Gregory	Back	Minnesota
261	Detroit Lions	Jim David	End	Colorado A&M
262	San Francisco 49ers	Jim Cozad	Tackle	Santa Clara
263	New York Giants	Bob Raley	Back	Texas
264	Cleveland Browns	Corky Johnson	Tackle	UC Santa Barbara
265	Los Angeles Rams	Joe Pahr	Back	Valparaiso

=== Round 23 ===
Pick #	NFL team	Player	Position	College
266	New York Yanks	Chet Freeman	Back	LSU
267	Chicago Cardinals	Red Stephens	Guard	San Francisco
268	Green Bay Packers	Frank Kapral	Guard	Michigan State
269	Philadelphia Eagles	Maury Schnell	Back	Iowa State
270	Pittsburgh Steelers	Vic Pollock	Back	Army
271	Washington Redskins	Ken Barfield	Tackle	Ole Miss
272	Chicago Bears	Paul Nestor	Tackle	Maryland
273	San Francisco 49ers	Bill Glazier	End	Arizona
274	Detroit Lions	Hal Maxwell	End	Ole Miss
275	New York Giants	Bob Bickel	Back	Duke
276	Cleveland Browns	Bobby Robertson	Back	Indiana
277	Los Angeles Rams	Don Greene	Tackle	Miami (OH)

=== Round 24 ===
Pick #	NFL team	Player	Position	College
278	New York Yanks	Bob Ward	Guard	Maryland
279	Green Bay Packers	John Schuetzner	End	South Carolina
280	Chicago Cardinals	E. J. Moore	Guard	Abilene Christian
281	Philadelphia Eagles	Joe Tyrrell	Guard	Temple
282	Pittsburgh Steelers	Bob Bestwick	Back	Pittsburgh
283	Washington Redskins	Ted Kirkland	End	Vanderbilt
284	Chicago Bears	Dick Mundinger	Tackle	Minnesota
285	Detroit Lions	Bob Werckle	Tackle	Vanderbilt
286	San Francisco 49ers	Ralph Kreuger	Tackle	California
287	New York Giants	Wes Mitchell	End	Pacific
288	Cleveland Browns	Junior Wren	Back	Missouri
289	Los Angeles Rams	Rich Kelnhofer	Guard	St. Ambrose

=== Round 25 ===
Pick #	NFL team	Player	Position	College
290	New York Yanks	Jim Monihan	Back	Rutgers
291	Chicago Cardinals	Cliff Anderson	End	Indiana
292	Green Bay Packers	Charlie LaPradd	Tackle	Florida
293	Philadelphia Eagles	Bob Kelley	Center	West Texas State
294	Pittsburgh Steelers	Bill Robinson	Back	Lincoln (MO)
295	Washington Redskins	Sal Gero	Tackle	Elon
296	Chicago Bears	Bob Stoddard	Tackle	Utah State
297	San Francisco 49ers	Bud Laughlin	Back	Kansas
298	Detroit Lions	By Bailey	Back	Washington State
299	New York Giants	Bill Kelley	Center	Pacific
300	Cleveland Browns	Billy Reddell	Back	Florida
301	Los Angeles Rams	Len Teeuws	Tackle	Tulane

=== Round 26 ===
Pick #	NFL team	Player	Position	College
302	New York Yanks	George Young	Tackle	Bucknell
303	Green Bay Packers	Charlie Stokes	Tackle	Tennessee
304	Chicago Cardinals	Charley Fry	Tackle	Maryland
305	Philadelphia Eagles	Bob Albert	Back	Bucknell
306	Pittsburgh Steelers	Bobby Wilson	Back	Alabama
307	Washington Redskins	Dunny Goode	Back	Hardin–Simmons
308	Chicago Bears	Bucky McElroy	Back	Mississippi Southern
309	Detroit Lions	Buddy Terry	End	Stephen F. Austin
310	San Francisco 49ers	Dick Kane	Guard	Cincinnati
311	New York Giants	Tom Lavery	End	Boston University
312	Cleveland Browns	Joe Vernasco	End	Illinois
313	Los Angeles Rams	Frank Fuller	Tackle	Kentucky

=== Round 27 ===
Pick #	NFL team	Player	Position	College
314	New York Yanks	Gil Bartosh	Back	TCU
315	Chicago Cardinals	Sam Moses	Tackle	Texas A&M
316	Green Bay Packers	I. D. Russell	Back	SMU
317	Philadelphia Eagles	Chuck Hill	Back	New Mexico
318	Pittsburgh Steelers	Dick Doyle	Back	Ohio State
319	Washington Redskins	Ben White	End	SMU
320	Chicago Bears	Bob Reid	Back	Baylor
321	San Francisco 49ers	Waldo Schaaf	Tackle	Oklahoma A&M
322	Detroit Lions	Bob Trout	End	Baylor
323	New York Giants	Duane Morrison	Back	Arizona State
324	Cleveland Browns	Bill Maletzky	Guard	Maryland
325	Los Angeles Rams	Hugh Meyer	Center	Texas A&M

=== Round 28 ===
Pick #	NFL team	Player	Position	College
326	New York Yanks	Doug Moseley	Center	Kentucky
327	Green Bay Packers	Billy Barrett	Back	Notre Dame
328	Chicago Cardinals	Harold Lutz	End	Alabama
329	Philadelphia Eagles	Johnny Brewer	Back	Louisville
330	Pittsburgh Steelers	Jerry Hanifan	Back	St. Bonaventure
331	Washington Redskins	Ron Engel	Back	Minnesota
332	Chicago Bears	Karney Scioscia	Back	Maryland
333	Detroit Lions	Hal Turner	End	Tennessee A&I State
334	San Francisco 49ers	Joe Palumbo	Guard	Virginia
335	New York Giants	Alton Patterson	Tackle	McMurry
336	Cleveland Browns	John Pietro	Guard	Brown
337	Los Angeles Rams	Granville Hart	Back	Mississippi Southern

=== Round 29 ===
Pick #	NFL team	Player	Position	College
338	New York Yanks	Russ Hudeck	Tackle	Texas A&M
339	Chicago Cardinals	Don Kasperan	Back	Purdue
340	Green Bay Packers	Bill Stratton	Back	Lewis
341	Philadelphia Eagles	Zippy Morocco	Back	Georgia
342	Pittsburgh Steelers	Chris Warriner	End	Pittsburgh
343	Washington Redskins	John Pappa	Back	California
344	Chicago Bears	Teddy Riggs	Back	Rice
345	San Francisco 49ers	Chuck Mosher	End	Colorado
346	Detroit Lions	Art Hudson	Back	Western Illinois
347	New York Giants	Jim Dillon	Back	California
348	Cleveland Browns	Walt Klevay	Back	Ohio State
349	Los Angeles Rams	Gerry Perry	Tackle	California

=== Round 30 ===
Pick #	NFL team	Player	Position	College
350	New York Yanks	Ray Suchy	Guard	Nevada
351	Green Bay Packers	Jack Fulkerson	Tackle	Mississippi Southern
352	Chicago Cardinals	Will Stolk	Back	Miami (FL)
353	Philadelphia Eagles	Don Stevens	Back	Illinois
354	Pittsburgh Steelers	Ed Kissell	Back	Wake Forest
355	Washington Redskins	Bob Linn	Back	Western Reserve
356	Chicago Bears	Bob Shemonski	Back	Maryland
357	Detroit Lions	Ray Don Dillon	Back	Prairie View A&M
358	San Francisco 49ers	Dick Patrick	Center	Oregon
359	New York Giants	Joe Arnold	Guard	Texas
360	Cleveland Browns	John Saban	Back	Xavier

= Pro Bowler	= Hall of Famer

== Notable undrafted players ==
^{†}	= Pro Bowler	‡	= Hall of Famer

Original NFL team	Player	Pos.	College	Notes
Philadelphia Eagles	Ed Bawel	HB	Evansville	
Los Angeles Rams	Howie Ferguson ^{†}	HB		
Los Angeles Rams	Night Train Lane^{‡}	CB	Scottsbluff JC	
Washington Redskins	Bob Sykes	FB	San Jose State	
Chicago Cardinals	Ralph Thomas	E	San Francisco	

== Hall of Famers ==
- Hugh McElhenny, halfback from Washington taken 1st round 9th overall by the San Francisco 49ers.

Inducted: Professional Football Hall of Fame class of 1970.

- Gino Marchetti, defensive end from San Francisco taken 2nd round 14th overall by the New York Yanks.

Inducted: Professional Football Hall of Fame class of 1972.

- Ollie Matson, halfback from San Francisco taken 1st round 3rd overall by the Chicago Cardinals.

Inducted: Professional Football Hall of Fame class of 1972.

- Dick "Night Train" Lane, defensive back attending Junior College was undrafted and signed as a free agent by the Los Angeles Rams.

Inducted: Professional Football Hall of Fame class of 1974.

- Frank Gifford, halfback from USC taken 1st round 11th overall by the New York Giants.

Inducted: Professional Football Hall of Fame class of 1977.

- Yale Lary, defensive back from Texas A&M taken 3rd round 34th overall by the Detroit Lions.

Inducted: Professional Football Hall of Fame class of 1979.

- Les Richter, linebacker from California taken 1st round 2nd overall by the New York Yanks.

Inducted: Professional Football Hall of Fame class of 2011.

- Bobby Dillon, defensive back from Texas taken 3rd round 28th overall by the Green Bay Packers.

Inducted: Professional Football Hall of Fame class of 2020.

- George Young, tackle from Bucknell taken 26th round 302nd overall by the New York Yanks.

Inducted: For his Executive achievements Professional Football Hall of Fame Class of 2020.
