= Vern Davis =

American football player (born 1949)

No. 16
- Position: Defensive back

Personal information
- Born: November 2, 1949 (age 77); Dowagiac, Michigan, U.S.
- Listed height: 6 ft 4 in (1.93 m)
- Listed weight: 208 lb (94 kg)

Career information
- High school: Dowagiac
- College: Western Michigan
- NFL draft: 1971: undrafted

Career history
- Philadelphia Eagles (1971)

Awards and highlights
- Second-team All-Mid-American Conference (1969)

Career NFL statistics
- Games played: 3
- Fumble recoveries: 1
- Stats at Pro Football Reference

Vernon Charles Davis (born November 2, 1949) is an American former professional football player who was a defensive back for one season with the Philadelphia Eagles of the National Football League (NFL). He played college football for the Western Michigan Broncos.

== Early life and college ==
Davis was born on November 2, 1949, in Dowagiac, Michigan. He attended Dowagiac High School, where he graduated in 1967. After graduating from Dowagiac, Davis enrolled at Western Michigan University. He played three seasons of varsity football, earning letters in 1968, 1969, and 1970. As a junior in 1969, he was named second-team all-conference. As a senior, he was named co-team captain and returned seven interceptions, including one for 100 yards. Davis was included in the 1971 edition of Who's Who in American Colleges and Universities.

At Western Michigan, Davis also competed in track and field.

== Professional career ==
After going unselected in the 1971 NFL draft, Davis was signed by the Philadelphia Eagles. He made the final roster and appeared in the first three games before being released on October 8. His only statistic recorded was one fumble recovery. Davis wore number 16 with the Eagles.
