= Al Dorow =

American football player (1929–2009)

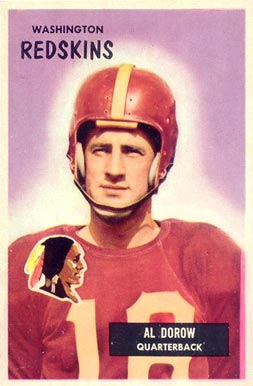
- Dorow on a 1955 Bowman football card

No. 10, 12, 16, 83, 96, 97
- Position: Quarterback

Personal information
- Born: November 15, 1929; Imlay City, Michigan, U.S.
- Died: December 6, 2009 (aged 80); Haslett, Michigan, U.S.
- Listed height: 6 ft 0 in (1.83 m)
- Listed weight: 193 lb (88 kg)

Career information
- College: Michigan State
- NFL draft: 1952: 3rd round, 31st overall pick

Career history

Playing
- Washington Redskins (1954–1956); Philadelphia Eagles (1957); Saskatchewan Roughriders (1958); BC Lions (1958–1959); Toronto Argonauts (1959); New York Titans (1960–1961); Buffalo Bills (1962)

Coaching
- Hillsdale (1963–1964) Backfield; Michigan State (1965–1970) Assistant; Hamilton Tiger-Cats (1971) Head coach

Awards and highlights
- Pro Bowl (1956); AFL All-Star (1961); First-team All-American (1951); Michigan State Hall of Fame (2023)

Career NFL statistics
- Passing attempts: 1,207
- Passing completions: 572
- Completion percentage: 47.4%
- TD–INT: 64–93
- Passing yards: 7,708
- Passer rating: 53.8
- Stats at Pro Football Reference

Albert Richard Dorow (November 15, 1929 – December 7, 2009) was an American professional football player who was a quarterback in the National Football League (NFL), American Football League (AFL), and Canadian Football League (CFL). He played college football for the Michigan State Spartans.

== Life and career ==
Dorow, a quarterback, played college football at Michigan State University and was All-American in 1951. He was selected 31st overall in the third round of the 1952 NFL draft. After serving the required two years in the military, Dorow played for the Washington Redskins during the 1954, 1955, and 1956 seasons, and for the Philadelphia Eagles in 1957. After being released by the Eagles before the start of the 1958 season, Dorow spent two years in the Canadian Football League, playing for Saskatchewan, British Columbia, and Toronto. Dorow moved to the AFL for its inaugural season, playing for the New York Titans (forerunner of the New York Jets) in 1960 and 1961, before being traded to the Buffalo Bills for the 1962 season. Dorow injured his arm in the fourth game of the 1962 season and was unable to play again.

Dorow's awards include All American in football for MSU in 1951. Dorow's other accomplishments include leading the AFL in most touchdowns thrown (26) in 1960. Dorow also co-holds the CFL single-game record for sacks with 7, matched by two others.

After leaving professional football, Dorow was a backfield coach for Hillsdale College in Michigan for the 1963 and 1964 seasons. He then became an assistant to Duffy Daugherty at Michigan State for the 1965 through 1970 seasons. He was the head coach of the Hamilton Tiger-Cats in 1971 and part of the 1972 season.

After football, Dorow worked as a salesman and manager, retiring in 1989.

== Death ==
Dorow died of bone cancer on December 7, 2009.

== See also ==
- List of American Football League players
