= Andy Davis (American football) =

American football player (1927–2007)

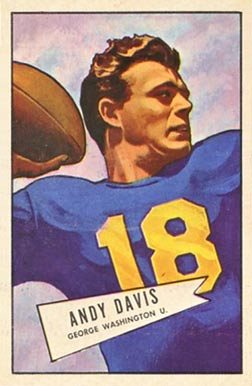
- Davis on a 1952 Bowman football card

No. 26
- Position: Defensive back

Personal information
- Born: July 28, 1927; Indianapolis, Indiana, U.S.
- Died: December 22, 2007 (aged 80); Silver Spring, Maryland, U.S.
- Listed height: 6 ft 0 in (1.83 m)
- Listed weight: 188 lb (85 kg)

Career information
- High school: Mckinley (Washington, D.C.)
- College: George Washington
- NFL draft: 1952: 2nd round, 19th overall pick

Career history
- Washington Redskins (1952)

Awards and highlights
- 2× Second-team All-SoCon (1948, 1950)
- Stats at Pro Football Reference

Andrew Nathan Davis Jr. (July 28, 1927 – December 22, 2007) was an American professional football defensive back in the National Football League (NFL) for the Washington Redskins. He played college football at George Washington University and was selected in the second round of the 1952 NFL draft.
