= Bob Sykes (American football) =

American football player (1927–2020)

No. 39
- Position: Fullback

Personal information
- Born: March 15, 1927; Oakland, California, U.S.
- Died: August 4, 2020 (aged 93); Laguna Niguel, California, U.S.
- Listed height: 6 ft 1 in (1.85 m)
- Listed weight: 218 lb (99 kg)

Career information
- High school: St. Aloysius (New Orleans, Louisiana)
- College: San Jose State
- NFL draft: 1952: undrafted

Career history
- Washington Redskins (1952)

Career NFL statistics
- Rushing yards: 10
- Rushing average: 2.5
- Receptions: 1
- Receiving yards: 5
- Stats at Pro Football Reference

Robert Eugene Sykes (March 15, 1927 – August 4, 2020) was an American professional football player who was a fullback in the National Football League for the Washington Redskins. He played college football for the San Jose State Spartans.

== Early life and education ==
Born in Oakland, California, Sykes graduated from St. Aloysius College (now Brother Martin High School) in New Orleans. After high school, Sykes served in the United States Army Air Forces as a private first class during World War II.

Following his military service, Sykes returned to California to enroll at Santa Rosa Junior College, where he played on the football team in 1948 and 1949. He then transferred to San Jose State College (now University), where he played for the San Jose State Spartans football team in 1950 and 1951.

== Pro football career ==
Undrafted in the 1952 NFL draft, Sykes signed with the Washington Redskins as a free agent. In four games with one start at fullback, Sykes had four carries for 10 yards and one reception for five yards.

== Post-football life ==
After retiring from football, Sykes owned a Dodge dealership in Santa Clara, California, Bob Sykes Dodge. Sykes died in Laguna Niguel, California, on August 4, 2020, aged 93.
