= Burt Delavan =

American football player (1929–2013)

No. 76
- Position: Offensive tackle

Personal information
- Born: December 2, 1929; Westwood, California, U.S.
- Died: August 15, 2013 (aged 83); Carmichael, California, U.S.
- Listed height: 6 ft 2 in (1.88 m)
- Listed weight: 236 lb (107 kg)

Career information
- High school: Sacramento (Sacramento, California)
- College: Menlo; Pacific (CA)
- NFL draft: 1952: 7th round, 85th overall pick

Career history
- Chicago Cardinals (1955–1956)

Career NFL statistics
- Games played: 14
- Games started: 10
- Fumble recoveries: 1
- Stats at Pro Football Reference

Darrell "Burt" Delavan (December 2, 1929 – August 15, 2013) was an American professional football tackle. He was a three-year letterman at the College of the Pacific—now known as the University of the Pacific—and was selected by the Los Angeles Rams in the 1952 NFL draft. In 1953, Delavan was drafted by the United States Army, and played for the Fort Ord Warriors for the 1953 and 1954 seasons. After his return to the Rams, in 1955, he was traded to the Chicago Cardinals.

Delavan died on August 15, 2013, in Carmichael, California, at age 83.
