= Jack Bighead =

American football player (1930–1993)

No. 80, 86, 76
- Positions: End, defensive end

Personal information
- Born: April 23, 1930; Sapulpa, Oklahoma, U.S.
- Died: April 28, 1993 (aged 63); Parker, Arizona, U.S.
- Listed height: 6 ft 3 in (1.91 m)
- Listed weight: 215 lb (98 kg)

Career information
- High school: Los Angeles Polytechnic (CA)
- College: Pepperdine
- NFL draft: 1952: 15th round, 170th overall pick

Career history
- Baltimore Colts (1954); Los Angeles Rams (1955); Hamilton Tiger-Cats (1956)

Awards and highlights
- 1948 Little All-American Honors

Career NFL statistics
- Receptions: 6
- Receiving Yards: 89
- Stats at Pro Football Reference

John Bighead (April 23, 1930 – April 28, 1993) was an American professional football player. A Yuchi Indian, he starred in football at L.A. Poly High in the 1940s and played in the National Football League (NFL). He was a 1948 graduate of Pepperdine University, whereat he earned Little All America honors in football and track. After serving in the United States Navy, he played two years in the NFL. He was drafted in the 15th round of the 1952 NFL draft by the Dallas Texans. Bighead then played professionally for the Baltimore Colts in 1954 and the Los Angeles Rams in 1955. He was the starter for the Rams before a career-ending leg injury. He played one season in the CFL with the Hamilton Tiger-Cats in 1956.

Bighead joined the teaching and coaching staff of the Anaheim Union High School District in 1957, and worked at Western, Magnolia, and Katella high schools before retiring in 1987.
