= John Saban =

American football player (1928–2013)

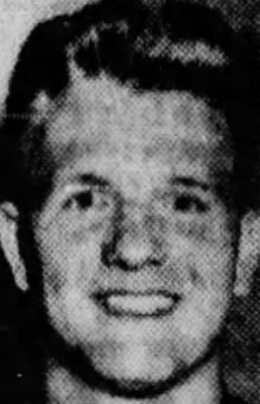
- Saban in 1952

Profile
- Position: Offensive fullback

Personal information
- Born: December 19, 1928; Lyons, Illinois, U.S.
- Died: January 4, 2013 (aged 84); Illinois, U.S.
- Listed height: 5 ft 11 in (1.80 m)

Career information
- College: Xavier
- NFL draft: 1952: 30th round, 360th overall pick

John Richard Saban (December 19, 1928 – January 4, 2013) was an American professional football offensive fullback.

== Life and career ==
Saban was born in Lyons, Illinois, the son of Nicolas and Mary Saban. He was the brother of Lou Saban, a football coach at Case Western Reserve University. He attended and graduated from Lyons Township High School. After graduating, he served in the United States Marine Corps during World War II.

Saban played for the Xavier Musketeers football team from 1948 to 1951. The next year, he was selected 360th overall by the Cleveland Browns of the National Football League (NFL) in the 30th round of the 1952 NFL Draft, but did not make it to the final roster, which after not making it, he later went into hospitality, owning Saban's Restaurant from 1962.

== Death ==
Saban died on January 4, 2013, in Illinois, at the age of 84.
