= Gaines Davis =

American football player (1913–1983)

Gains Davis

Profile
- Position: Guard

Personal information
- Born: October 10, 1913
- Died: April 4, 1972 (aged 58)
- Listed height: 5 ft 11 in (1.80 m)
- Listed weight: 230 lb (104 kg)

Career information
- College: Texas Tech

Career history
- New York Giants (1936)
- Stats at Pro Football Reference

Gaines Nunnelly Davis mid-identified in one source as Trenton Gaines Davis (October 10, 1913 - December 1983) was an American football player.

Davis war born in 1914 in Abilene, Texas. He attended St. Joseph High School in Lubbock, Texas, and then enrolled at Texas Technological College (now known as Texas Tech University). He played college football as a guard for the Texas Tech Red Raiders from 1933 to 1935.

In February 1936, Davis signed with the New York Giants of the National Football League. He played for the Giants as a guard during their 1936 season, appearing in six games.

After his playing career ended, Davis became a manager of Texas-New Mexico Utilities Company at Floydada, Texas. In August 1934, he married Edith Dean in Tahoka, Texas. He served in the United States Navy during World War II. He later operated a beauty salon with his wife in Lamesa, Texas. He died in Lamesa in 1972 at age 58.
