= Bill DuLac =

American football player (born 1951)

No. 68
- Position: Offensive guard

Personal information
- Born: January 15, 1951 (age 75); Detroit, Michigan, U.S.
- Listed height: 6 ft 4 in (1.93 m)
- Listed weight: 250 lb (113 kg)

Career information
- High school: Bishop Gallagher (MI)
- College: Eastern Michigan
- NFL draft: 1973: 7th round, 167th overall pick

Career history
- Los Angeles Rams (1973)*; New England Patriots (1974–1975)
- * Offseason or practice squad member only
- Stats at Pro Football Reference

William Frank DuLac (born January 15, 1951) is an American former professional football player who was an offensive guard for two seasons with the New England Patriots of the National Football League (NFL). He played college football for the Eastern Michigan Eagles.

== Early life ==
DuLac was born in Detroit, Michigan. He went to high school at Bishop Gallagher (Michigan).

== College career ==
He went to Eastern Michigan University for college. He played there from 1970 to 1972. He was named team captain in 1972.

== Professional career ==
Los Angeles Rams

He was selected in the 7th round (167) of the 1973 NFL draft by the Los Angeles Rams. He did not play for them in 1973.

New England Patriots

DuLac played for the New England Patriots from 1974 to 1975. In both years he played 13 games. In his career he played 26 games and started 2 of them. He wore number 68.

== Later life ==
In 2016, he was inducted into the Bishop Gallagher Hall of Fame. In 2017 he was inducted into the Eastern Michigan Hall of Fame.
