= Snowburst =

The term snowburst was coined in the 1960s by Prof. Robert Sykes who taught meteorology at SUNY Oswego, in northern New York. He used the term to describe a snowstorm that occurred December 7–11, 1958 in Oswego, New York. This particular storm dropped almost 6 feet of snow on the city including 40 inches in 24 hours. It was commonly referred to as "The Blizzard of '58" which was an inaccurate title, as the storm was not accompanied by high wind and the snow fell straight down. Another Blizzard of '58 occurred earlier that year in February across Oswego and Onondaga counties. This storm was an actual blizzard due to the high winds, blowing snow and cold. 26.1" of snow was measured at Syracuse N.Y. and drifts reached 20 feet in Oswego County.

(See Thirtieth Publication of the Oswego County Historical Society, (1969) and The Climate and Snow Climatology of Oswego N.Y., (1971)

Since then the term "snowburst" has been used to describe any heavy lake effect snowfall not accompanied by high winds. If high winds are present the conditions are referred to as "snow squalls"; and in extreme circumstances it becomes a blizzard.

In mid January 1997 a snow burst dropped 95 inches of snow on the hamlet of Montague, New York on the Tug Hill Plateau. This storm included a record for the contiguous United States of 77" in 24 hours on the 11th and 12th, 40" of this total fell in 8 hours.

"Snowburst" is now a commonly used term in meteorology, used frequently by the National Weather Service, the Weather Channel and local meteorologist throughout the Great Lakes region.

The meteorological definition of a snowburst is as follows:

"A short period of heavy snowfall, say on the order of 10-14 hours or so with snowfall rates around two inches per hour and greater. It is believed that snow frequently forms and falls out within "short" distances - say hundreds of feet. There is a tendency for the larger flakes to fall out closer to the shore."

NOAA defines snowburst as:

"Very intense shower of snow, often of short duration, that greatly restricts visibility and produces periods of rapid snow accumulation."
