= Phil Darns =

American football player (born 1959)

No. 75
- Position: Defensive end

Personal information
- Born: July 27, 1959 (age 67); Tampa, Florida, U.S.
- Listed height: 6 ft 3 in (1.91 m)
- Listed weight: 245 lb (111 kg)

Career information
- High school: Tampa Bay Tech
- College: Mississippi Valley State
- NFL draft: 1982: undrafted

Career history

Playing
- New York Jets (1982)*; New Jersey Generals (1983)*; Detroit Lions (1983–1984); Tampa Bay Buccaneers (1984–1985)
- * Offseason or practice squad member only

Coaching
- Tampa Catholic High School (1991) Assistant coach; Blake High School (2002) Assistant coach

Career NFL statistics
- Games played: 2
- Stats at Pro Football Reference

Phillip G. Darns (born July 27, 1959) is an American former professional football player who was a defensive end for one season in the National Football League (NFL) with the Tampa Bay Buccaneers. He played college football for the Mississippi Valley State Delta Devils and was signed by the New York Jets as an undrafted free agent in 1982. Darns also spent time with the Detroit Lions in the NFL and the New Jersey Generals in the United States Football League (USFL).

== Early life and education ==
Darns was born on July 27, 1959, in Tampa, Florida. He attended Tampa Bay Technical High School and played college football for the Mississippi Valley State Delta Devils in 1981.

== Professional career ==
Darns was signed out of college by the New York Jets in 1982. He was released at the final roster cuts in August.

In October, Darns was signed by the New Jersey Generals of the United States Football League (USFL) for their 1983 season. He was released in February 1983.

Darns was later signed back into the NFL by the Detroit Lions, but was injured and was placed on injured reserve, where he spent the whole 1983 season. He was released by the Lions on August 27, 1984.

In November, Darns was signed by the Tampa Bay Buccaneers. He played in two games with the Buccaneers, a week 13 loss to the Los Angeles Rams and a week 14 loss against the Green Bay Packers. He wore number 75 with the team. Darns was placed on injured reserve after his two appearances.

In 1986, Darns attended a Tampa Bay Bandits tryout camp.

== Later life ==
In 1991, Darns was an assistant coach at Tampa Catholic High School. In 2002, he was reported as being a coach at Blake High School in Tampa.

Darns later became a firefighter.
