= 1950 Cal Aggies football team =

American college football season

1950 Cal Aggies football
- Conference: Far Western Conference
- Record: 3–5 (3–1 FWC)
- Head coach: Ted Forbes (2nd season)
- Captain: Don Lehman
- Home stadium: Aggie Field

1950 Far Western Conference football standings
	Conf.					Overall
Team	W		L		T	W		L		T
San Francisco State $	4	–	0	–	0	6	–	2	–	0
Cal Aggies	3	–	1	–	0	3	–	5	–	0
Chico State	2	–	2	–	0	2	–	6	–	0
Southern Oregon	1	–	3	–	0	3	–	7	–	0
Humboldt State	0	–	4	–	0	0	–	4	–	1
$ – Conference champion

The 1950 Cal Aggies football team represented the College of Agriculture at Davis—now known as the University of California, Davis—as a member of the Far Western Conference (FWC) during the 1950 college football season. Led by second-year head coach Ted Forbes, the Aggies compiled an overall record of 3–5 with a mark of 3–1 in conference play, placing second in the FWC title. The team was outscored by its opponents 150 to 119 for the season. The Cal Aggies played home games at Aggie Field in Davis, California.

== Schedule ==
Date	Opponent	Site	Result	Source
September 29	Occidental*	Aggie Field; Davis, CA	L 0–24	
October 6	Stanford JV*	Aggie Field; Davis, CA	L 12–26	
October 13	Humboldt State	Aggie Field; Davis, CA	W 40–2	
October 21	at Whittier*	Hadley Field; Whittier, CA	L 7–27	
October 28	at Southern Oregon	Walter E. Phillips Field ?; Ashland, OR	W 8–6	
November 4	San Francisco State	Aggie Field; Davis, CA	L 26–32	
November 11	vs. Santa Barbara (Note: The game against Santa Barbara was part of an "All-UC Doubleheader" that was held annually from 1948 to 1963. The other game of the double-header was California vs. UCLA. The games were always held at the home stadium of either Cal or UCLA.)*	California Memorial Stadium; Berkeley, CA	L 0–26	
November 18	at Chico State	Chico High School Stadium; Chico, CA	W 26–7	
*Non-conference game
