= 1950 Santa Barbara Gauchos football team =

American college football season

1950 Santa Barbara Gauchos football
- Conference: California Collegiate Athletic Association
- Record: 7–3 (3–1 CCAA)
- Head coach: Roy Engle (2nd season)
- Home stadium: La Playa Stadium

1950 California Collegiate Athletic Association football standings
	Conf.					Overall
Team	W		L		T	W		L		T
San Diego State $	3	–	0	–	1	5	–	3	–	1
Santa Barbara	3	–	1	–	0	7	–	3	–	0
Pepperdine	2	–	2	–	0	4	–	5	–	0
Fresno State	1	–	2	–	1	2	–	6	–	1
Cal Poly	0	–	4	–	0	3	–	7	–	0
$ – Conference champion

The 1950 UC Santa Barbara Gauchos football team represented Santa Barbara College (Note: University of California, Santa Barbara was known as Santa Barbara College of the University of California from 1944 to 1957.) during the 1950 college football season.

Santa Barbara competed in the California Collegiate Athletic Association (CCAA). The team was led by second-year head coach Roy Engle and played home games at La Playa Stadium in Santa Barbara, California. They finished the season with a record of seven wins and three losses (7–3, 3–1 CCAA).

== Schedule ==
Date	Opponent	Site	Result	Attendance	Source
September 23	Caltech*	La Playa Stadium; Santa Barbara, CA	W 47–7		
September 30	Pomona*	La Playa Stadium; Santa Barbara, CA	W 35–7		
October 6	at Occidental*	D.W. Patterson Field; Los Angeles, CA	L 10–14		
October 13	at Fresno State	Ratcliffe Stadium; Fresno, CA	W 13–7		
October 20	Idaho State*	La Playa Stadium; Santa Barbara, CA	W 12–0		
October 28	Cal Poly	La Playa Stadium; Santa Barbara, CA	W 20–7		
November 4	at Pepperdine	Gilmore Stadium; Los Angeles, CA	W 16–7	5,000	
November 11	at Cal Aggies (Note: The game against the Cal Aggies was part of an "All-UC Doubleheader" that was held annually from 1948 to 1963. The other game of the double-header was California vs. UCLA. The games were always held at the home stadium of either Cal or UCLA.)*	California Memorial Stadium; Berkeley, CA	W 26–0		
November 18	at Whittier*	Hadley Field; Whittier, CA	L 6–18		
November 25	San Diego State	La Playa Stadium; Santa Barbara, CA	L 12–28		
*Non-conference game
