= 1950 Humboldt State Lumberjacks football team =

American college football season

1950 Humboldt State Lumberjacks football
- Conference: Far Western Conference
- Record: 0–4–1 (0–4 FWC)
- Head coach: Ted Staffler (2nd season)
- Home stadium: Redwood Bowl

1950 Far Western Conference football standings
	Conf.					Overall
Team	W		L		T	W		L		T
San Francisco State $	4	–	0	–	0	6	–	2	–	0
Cal Aggies	3	–	1	–	0	3	–	5	–	0
Chico State	2	–	2	–	0	2	–	6	–	0
Southern Oregon	1	–	3	–	0	3	–	7	–	0
Humboldt State	0	–	4	–	0	0	–	4	–	1
$ – Conference champion

The 1950 Humboldt State Lumberjacks football team represented Humboldt State College—now known as California State Polytechnic University, Humboldt—as a member of the Far Western Conference (FWC) during the 1950 college football season. Led Ted Staffler in his second and final season, the Lumberjacks compiled an overall record of 0–4–1 with a mark of 0–4 in conference play, placing last out of five teams in the FWC, and were outscored by their opponents 200 to 28 for the season. The team played home games at the Redwood Bowl in Arcata, California. Due to injuries, the Lumberjacks cancelled the last three games of the season.

The Lumberjacks did not win a game during Staffler's two-tenure at Humboldt State. He finished with a record of 0–12–2. His winning percentage of .071 the lowest of any coach in program history.

== Schedule ==
Date	Opponent	Site	Result	Source
October 1	Cal Poly San Dimas*	Redwood Bowl; Arcata, CA	T 13–13	
October 7	Chico State	Redwood Bowl; Arcata, CA	L 6–39	
October 13	at Cal Aggies	Aggie Field; Davis, CA	L 2–40	
October 20	at San Francisco State	Cox Stadium; San Francisco, CA	L 0–53	
November 4	Southern Oregon^{†}	Redwood Bowl; Arcata, CA	L 7–55	
November 11	California JV (Note: The University of California JV team was commonly known as the "Cal Ramblers".)*	Redwood Bowl; Arcata, CA	Cancelled	
*Non-conference game; ^{†}Homecoming
