= 1950 San Francisco State Gators football team =

American college football season

1950 San Francisco State Gators football

FWC champion

Pear Bowl, L 7–61 vs. Lewis & Clark
- Conference: Far Western Conference
- Record: 6–2 (4–0 FWC)
- Head coach: Joe Verducci (1st season)
- Home stadium: Cox Stadium

1950 Far Western Conference football standings
	Conf.					Overall
Team	W		L		T	W		L		T
San Francisco State $	4	–	0	–	0	6	–	2	–	0
Cal Aggies	3	–	1	–	0	3	–	5	–	0
Chico State	2	–	2	–	0	2	–	6	–	0
Southern Oregon	1	–	3	–	0	3	–	7	–	0
Humboldt State	0	–	4	–	0	0	–	4	–	1
$ – Conference champion

The 1950 San Francisco State Gators football team represented San Francisco State College—now known as San Francisco State University—as a member of the Far Western Conference (FWC) during the 1950 college football season. Led by first-year head coach Joe Verducci, San Francisco State compiled an overall record of 6–2 with a mark of 4–0 in conference play, winning the FWC title, the program's first conference championship. As champion of the FWC, the Gators qualified for the fifth annual Pear Bowl in Medford, Oregon. San Francisco State lost the game to Lewis & Clark, 61–7. For the season the team outscored by its opponents 260 to 180. The Gators played home games at Cox Stadium in San Francisco.

== Schedule ==
Date	Opponent	Site	Result	Source
September 28	Caltech*	Cox Stadium; San Francisco, CA	W 35–7	
October 7	at Southern Oregon	Walter E. Phillips Field; Ashland, OR	W 39–21	
October 13	Whittier*	Cox Stadium; San Francisco, CA	L 20–41	
October 20	Humboldt State	Cox Stadium; San Francisco, CA	W 53–0	
October 28	Chico State	Cox Stadium; San Francisco, CA	W 15–6	
November 4	at Cal Aggies	Aggie Field; Davis, CA	W 32–26	
November 10	Cal Poly San Dimas*	Cox Stadium; San Francisco, CA	W 59–18	
November 23	vs. Lewis & Clark*	Medford Stadium; Medford, OR (Pear Bowl)	L 7–61	
*Non-conference game
