= San Francisco State Gators football =

American college football team, 1931–1994

- First season: 1931
- Last season: 1994
- Stadium: Cox Stadium (capacity: 5,000)
- Location: San Francisco, California
- Conference: Northern California Athletic Conference
- Bowl record: 0–3 (.000)
- Colors: Purple and gold

The San Francisco State Gators football team represented San Francisco State University (formerly San Francisco State Teacher's College) from the 1931 through 1994 seasons. The Gators originally competed as an independent prior to World War II, then as a member of the Far West Conference from 1946 until the conference changed its name to become the Northern California Athletic Conference, where they remained through the 1994 season. San Francisco State played its home games at multiple stadiums throughout its history with the most recent being Cox Field in San Francisco. San Francisco State was known as the "Cradle of Coaches", having produced coaching greats such as Mike Holmgren, Andy Reid, Bob Toledo, and many others.

== History ==
=== Early years ===
San Francisco State Teachers College was first coached by Dave Cox, who had previously coached at Polytechnic High, starting in the 1931 season. Dave Cox coached the team- then known as the "Golden Gaters"- for four seasons before announcing his resignation due to ill health on August 31, 1935. He was replaced by his two assistants, Dan Farmer who had played and coached at Chico State, and Hal Hardin from Oregon State. Farmer coached the backs while Hardin worked with the linemen. Farmer took over the head coaching position and was described in the Berkeley Daily Gazette as "one of the greatest athletes ever to graduate from Chico," He also coached the "Gaters'" basketball team. During the 1935 season, veteran halfback Ralph Nathan was injured for two weeks but returned to the backfield to join quarterback Keith Cox against San Francisco Junior College. In most newspaper accounts from 1935 to 1940, the team was referred to as the "Staters".

Farmer was later honored by Golden Gater rival Chico State, his alma mater, with a trophy bearing his name that was contested between the two schools. After spending six seasons coaching the football team, Farmer was replaced by former St. Mary's All-American halfback Dick Boyle in October 1938. During the 1940 season, Boyle's Staters scrimmaged throughout the week in preparation for matches against military sides like the Moffett Field Air Corps Eleven, and over half of his playbook consisted of passing plays to make use of "capable tossers" including Reno Cardoni, John Verducci, Dick Chin, and Fred Hinze.

The outbreak of World War II caused a flurry of change for the "Staters" football program. By this time, publications were referring to the team as the "Gaters". Dick Boyle became a lieutenant in the navy after the 1941 season and was replaced by Ray Kaufman in June 1942. Kaufman's tenure was to be a short one, however, as it was announced that Dan Farmer would return to replace Kaufman, who entered the Navy as a gunnery officer, in October of the same year. San Francisco State did not field a team in 1943 or 1944 and played a limited schedule at the "Gators" in 1945. While Farmer remained with the State College through the decade in various capacities including head coach of the basketball program, he stepped down from football upon Boyle's return from service in the Navy for the 1946 season. Boyle's second stint as head coach in the late 1940s is remembered by his successful protest of the "deadman" trick play, which was outlawed in a "gentlemen's agreement" between Far Western Conference schools after used by Southern Oregon to defeat State College 13–7 in the 1947 season.

=== The Fruit Bowl ===
San Francisco State met the Southern University Jaguars in the 1948 Fruit Bowl in San Francisco, finding themselves completely outclassed on a muddy field and shut out 30–0 in front of 5,000 fans. The Fruit Bowl game is noteworthy for being the first interracial bowl game played in the United States.

=== The Verducci era ===
The arrival of Joe Verducci to San Francisco State from St. Mary's College was rather unexpected; after all, St. Mary's was a team that had defeated Texas Tech in the Cotton Bowl in 1939, and followed it up with appearances in the Sugar Bowl and the Oil Bowl in 1946 and 1947. San Francisco State was coming off a shutout loss to Southern. Verducci must have made a difference, as St. Mary's did not return to another bowl while SF State became a Far West powerhouse in the next decade. Verducci's time with the Gaels was indeed short, having replaced "Irish Jimmy Phelan" (who became the mentor of the Los Angeles Dons of the All-America conference), in April 1948. Verducci had been a quarterback with the University of California, and had coached Polytechnic High to a record of 35–6–6 from 1938 to 1943.

The 1950 season, Verducci's first, was successful for the Gators. This was the first winning season in San Francisco State football history, as the team went through the regular season with only a single loss (to Whittier on October 13). They met Lewis & Clark in the Pear Bowl at Medford on Thanksgiving day, losing by a score of 61–7.

Verducci's San Francisco State team went undefeated in 1959, then had only one loss in 1960. He was named Northern California Coach of the Year in November 1960, angering fans of Humboldt State whose coach Phil Sarboe had taken the Lumberjacks to a 9–0 record and an 18-game winning streak, including handing Verducci and the Gators their lone loss in 1960. Students at Humboldt State college burned three dummies representing sports writers in effigy.

Verducci had announced his retirement from coaching on May 27, 1960, effective at the end of the 1960 season. He remained at San Francisco State as athletic director. College President Glenn S. Dumke named Vic Rowen, line coach for the previous six seasons, as his successor. In eleven years under Verducci, the Gators had a record of 74–31, for a winning percentage of .704. Verducci's teams won the conference title six times.

=== The Rowen era ===
Vic Rowen coached the team for the next 29 seasons. Under Rowen the Gators compiled a record of 130–165–10, a .443 winning percentage. His teams won the conference championship five times (1961, 1962, 1963, 1965, & 1967), and they appeared in one bowl game during his tenure (the 1967 Camellia Bowl).

The 1985 season showed promise behind quarterback Rich Strasser, who was described by the coach of the opposing Santa Clara Broncos as "the Division II Doug Flutie". In an early season matchup in September against Cal Lutheran, the combination of Strasser and receiver Ron Teitel could not overcome the clock in the final seconds, but managed to impress the Los Angeles Times staff writer nonetheless.

=== After Rowen ===
Dennis Creehan came to San Francisco State after a turmoil-filled day in March 1990 when Creehan was named the linebackers coach for the Pittsburgh Steelers, only to have the team rescind the appointment the next day once Steelers coach Chuck Noll discovered that Creehan was the headman at SFSU, instead of an assistant coach at UC Berkeley as he had been led to believe. The Steelers hired Bob Valesente for the position and Creehan remained at San Francisco State, but argued that his opportunity to work in the National Football League (NFL) was stolen by the newspapers in Pittsburgh, claiming to have had his career ruined and his family humiliated by reporters at the Post-Gazette.

Following Hamilton, Creehan, and Rowan as the fourth coach in as many years was Dick Mannini, announced for the position on July 21, 1992. Mannini had served as the defensive coordinator at Stanford from 1984 to 1988, and had been the head coach of the St. Mary's Gaels from 1977 to 1983. He coached the Gators for their final three seasons until president Robert A. Corrigan killed the program on March 8, 1995.

San Francisco State Football did not have a winning season after 1973, and only a single winning season after 1967; but they won eight conference titles between 1954 and 1967 and had a run of 11 straight winning seasons.

== Head coaches ==
Tenure	Coach	Years	Record	Pct.
1931–1934	Dave Cox	4	8–19–4	.323
1935–1938	Dan Farmer & Hal Hardin (co-coaches)	4	7–19–3	.293
1939–1941	Dick Boyle	3	7–13–3	.369
1942	Ray Kaufman	1/2	0–4	.000
1942, 1945	Dan Farmer	1 1/2	0–4	.000
1946–1949	Dick Boyle	4	7–13–3	.397
1950–1960	Joe Verducci	11	74–31	.704
1961–1989	Vic Rowen	29	120–163–10	.427
1990	Dennis Creehan	1	4–7	.363
1991	Harold Hamilton	1	3–7	.300
1992–1994	Dick Mannini	3	6–22	.214
Totals	11 coaches	62	236–302–23	.441

== Records ==
=== Bowl results ===
Date	Bowl	Location	W/L	Opponent	PF	PA
December 5, 1948	Fruit Bowl	San Francisco, California	L	Southern	0	30
November 27, 1950	Pear Bowl	Medford, Oregon	L	Lewis & Clark	7	61
December 9, 1967	Camellia Bowl	Sacramento, California	L	San Diego State	6	27
Total	3 bowl games		0–3		13	118

== Gators in the pros ==
=== In the NFL ===
San Francisco State University has 14 alumni who were drafted into the National Football League. Among those drafted into the NFL, Floyd Peters would go on to become a standout defensive tackle for the Baltimore Colts, earning a bid to the Pro Bowl three times. Likewise, Elmer Collett had a ten-year career with the San Francisco 49ers as well as the Baltimore Colts, making it to the Pro Bowl in the 1969 season.

Another NFL figure, Bill Baird, was drafted into the American Football League and started for the New York Jets from 1963 to 1969. Baird was a part of the Jets team that played in Super Bowl III in 1969 that defeated a heavily favored NFL Baltimore Colts team to give the AFL their first (and the Jets to date only) Super Bowl victory.

Several NFL coaches were on the staff of San Francisco State. Dirk Koetter, former head coach of the Tampa Bay Buccaneers, was the Gators' offensive coordinator in 1985 and Andy Reid, current head coach of the Kansas City Chiefs and former head coach of the Philadelphia Eagles, was the Gators' offensive line coach from 1983 to 1985.

- Carl Kammerer did his undergraduate work at College of the Pacific, but his graduate work at San Francisco State while a player for the San Francisco 49ers.

=== In other professional leagues ===
In addition to the players that competed in the NFL, there have been several former Gators that have made careers in other professional football leagues. Former Gator defensive end Nick Kukilica earned a place among the All-Stars of the short-lived Continental Football League in 1969, playing for the Sacramento Capitols. Likewise, several Gators found success with the Canadian Football League; Doug Parish had a career with the Edmonton Eskimos, while Ken Hailey played for the Winnipeg Blue Bombers.
