= 1950 Cal Poly Mustangs football team =

American college football season

1950 Cal Poly Mustangs football
- Conference: California Collegiate Athletic Association
- Record: 3–7 (0–4 CCAA)
- Head coach: LeRoy Hughes (1st season)
- Home stadium: Mustang Stadium

1950 California Collegiate Athletic Association football standings
	Conf.					Overall
Team	W		L		T	W		L		T
San Diego State $	3	–	0	–	1	5	–	3	–	1
Santa Barbara	3	–	1	–	0	7	–	3	–	0
Pepperdine	2	–	2	–	0	4	–	5	–	0
Fresno State	1	–	2	–	1	2	–	6	–	1
Cal Poly	0	–	4	–	0	3	–	7	–	0
$ – Conference champion

The 1950 Cal Poly Mustangs football team represented California Polytechnic State College—now known as California Polytechnic State University, San Luis Obispo—as a member of the California Collegiate Athletic Association (CCAA) during the 1950 college football season. Led by first-year head coach LeRoy Hughes, Cal Poly compiled an overall record of 3–7 with a mark of 0–4 in conference play, placing last out of five teams in the CCAA. The Mustangs played home games at Mustang Stadium in San Luis Obispo, California.

== Schedule ==
Date	Time	Opponent	Site	Result	Attendance	Source
September 16		Pepperdine	Mustang Stadium; San Luis Obispo, CA	L 12–20		
September 23		Fresno State	Mustang Stadium; San Luis Obispo, CA	L 7–31	5,000	
September 30		Redlands*	Mustang Stadium; San Luis Obispo, CA	W 20–14		
October 13		at Occidental*	Occidental Stadium; Los Angeles, CA	L 14–24		
October 21		Stanford B team*	Mustang Stadium; San Luis Obispo, CA	L 14–15		
October 28		at Santa Barbara	La Playa Stadium; Santa Barbara, CA	L 7–20		
November 4		Chico State*	Mustang Stadium; San Luis Obispo, CA	W 45–13		
November 11		at Southern Oregon*	Walter E. Phillips Field?; Ashland, OR	W 45–6		
November 18		San Diego State	Mustang Stadium; San Luis Obispo, CA	L 8–12	1,000	
November 23	2:00 p.m.	Bradley*	Mustang Stadium; San Luis Obispo, CA	L 21–35	2,000	
*Non-conference game; All times are in Pacific time
