= 1950 Santa Clara Broncos football team =

American college football season

1950 Santa Clara Broncos football
- Conference: Independent
- Record: 3–7
- Head coach: Richard F. Gallagher (1st season)
- Home stadium: Kezar Stadium

1950 Western college football independents records
	Conf.			Overall
Team	W	L	T	W		L		T
Loyola (CA)		–		8	–	1	–	0
Pacific (CA)		–		7	–	3	–	1
San Francisco		–		7	–	4	–	0
San Jose State		–		6	–	3	–	1
Hawaii		–		5	–	4	–	2
Montana		–		5	–	5	–	0
La Verne		–		3	–	5	–	0
Santa Clara		–		3	–	7	–	0
Saint Mary's		–		2	–	7	–	1
Cal Poly San Dimas		–		1	–	6	–	1
Nevada		–		1	–	9	–	0

The 1950 Santa Clara Broncos football team was an American football team that represented Santa Clara University as an independent during the 1950 college football season. In their first season under head coach Richard F. Gallagher, the Broncos compiled a 3–7 record and were outscored by opponents by a combined total of 198 to 165.

== Schedule ==
Date	Opponent	Rank	Site	Result	Attendance	Source
September 23	at No. 14 California		California Memorial Stadium; Berkeley, CA	L 9–27	46,000	
September 30	at Rice		Rice Stadium; Houston, TX	L 7–27	68,000	
October 7	at San Jose State		Spartan Stadium; San Jose, CA	L 10–14	16,190	
October 14	at No. 6 Stanford		Stanford Stadium; Stanford, CA	L 13–23	29,000	
October 22	vs. Nevada		Charles C. Hughes Stadium; Sacramento, CA	W 55–0	6,000	
October 28	at Marquette		Marquette Stadium; Milwaukee, MI	L 14–21	14,000	
November 4	at Pacific (CA)		Pacific Memorial Stadium; Stockton, CA	L 14–33	23,200	
November 11	at San Francisco		Kezar Stadium; San Francisco, CA	L 6–27	13,567	
November 18	vs. Saint Mary's		Kezar Stadium; San Francisco, CA	W 9–0	11,000	
November 25	at No. 20 Loyola (CA)		Gilmore Stadium; Los Angeles, CA	W 28–26	15,200	
Rankings from AP Poll released prior to the game
