= Ted Forbes =

American football player and coach

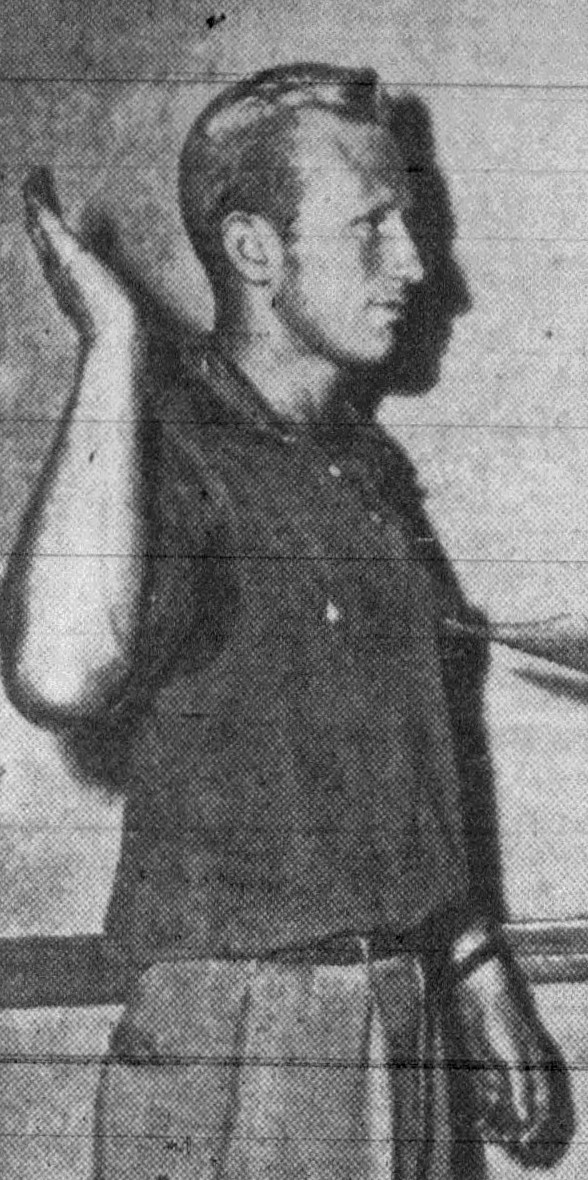
- Forbes, c. 1942

Playing career

Football
- 1940–1941: UCLA

Baseball
- c. 1940: UCLA
- Positions: Halfback (football); Second baseman (baseball)

Coaching career (HC unless noted)

Football
- 1947: Burlingame HS (CA)
- 1948: Cal Aggies (assistant)
- 1949–1953: Cal Aggies
- 1955: Cal Aggies

Head coaching record
- Overall: 21–29–2 (college); 3–4 (high school)

Accomplishments and honors

Championships
- 2 Far Western (1949, 1951)

Ted Forbes was an American football coach. He served as the head football coach at the Northern Branch of the College of Agriculture—now known as the University of California, Davis (UC Davis)—from 1949 to 1953 and again in 1955, compiling a record of 24–42–8. Forbes played college football and college baseball at the University of California, Los Angeles (UCLA). He came to Davis in 1948 as an assistant coach after serving as head coach for one season at Burlingame High School in Burlingame, California.

== Head coaching record ==
=== College ===
Year	Team	Overall	Conference	Standing	Bowl/playoffs
Cal Aggies (Far Western Conference) (1949–1953)
1949	Cal Aggies	5–4	4–0	1st	L Pear
1950	Cal Aggies	3–5	3–1	2nd	
1951	Cal Aggies	5–4	3–1	1st	L Pear
1952	Cal Aggies	2–7	2–1	2nd	
1953	Cal Aggies	1–6–1	1–2–1	3rd	
Cal Aggies (Far Western Conference) (1955)
1955	Cal Aggies	5–3–1	3–1–1	2nd	
Cal Aggies:		21–29–2	16–6–2		
Total:		21–29–2			
National championship Conference title Conference division title or championship game berth
