= LaVern Torgeson =

American football player and coach (1929–2015)

No. 53
- Positions: Linebacker, center

Personal information
- Born: February 28, 1929; La Crosse, Washington, U.S.
- Died: March 20, 2015 (aged 86); Huntington Beach, California, U.S.
- Listed height: 6 ft 0 in (1.83 m)
- Listed weight: 215 lb (98 kg)

Career information
- College: Washington State (1947–1950)
- NFL draft: 1951: 5th round, 58th overall pick

Career history

Playing
- Detroit Lions (1951–1954); Washington Redskins (1955–1957)

Coaching
- Washington Redskins (1959–1961) Assistant coach; Pittsburgh Steelers (1962–1968) Assistant coach; Los Angeles Rams (1969–1970) Defensive line coach; Washington Redskins (1971–1977) Defensive coordinator; Los Angeles Rams (1978–1980) Assistant coach; Washington Redskins (1981–1993) Assistant coach; Frankfurt Galaxy (1996) Defensive coordinator & linebackers coach

Awards and highlights
- 3× Super Bowl champion (XVII, XXII, XXVI); 2× NFL champion (1952, 1953); 2× Second-team All-Pro (1954, 1955); 3× Pro Bowl (1954-1956); First-team All-PCC (1950)

Career NFL statistics
- Interceptions: 18
- Fumble recoveries: 6
- Total touchdowns: 1
- Stats at Pro Football Reference
- Coaching profile at Pro Football Reference

LaVern Earl "Torgy" Torgeson (February 28, 1929 – March 20, 2015) was an American professional football player and coach in the National Football League (NFL). He played college football for the Washington State Cougars from 1948 through 1950. Torgeson played in the NFL for seven seasons, principally as a linebacker, for the Detroit Lions from 1951 to 1954 and for the Washington Redskins from 1955 to 1957.

After retiring as a player, Torgeson worked for 35 years from 1959 to 1993 as an assistant coach in the NFL. His coaching positions included stints with the Washington Redskins (1959–1961, 1971–1977, 1981–1993), Pittsburgh Steelers (1962–1968), and Los Angeles Rams (1969–1970, 1978–1980). He was a coach on three Super Bowl championship teams in 1982, 1987, and 1991. As a player and coach, he spent 42 years in the NFL, 26 of them with the Redskins.

== Early life ==
Torgeson was born in La Crosse, Washington, a small town in the eastern part of the state, and attended La Crosse High School, and excelled in football, basketball, and baseball.

== College football ==
After graduating from high school in 1947, Torgeson enrolled at nearby Washington State College in Pullman, where he played college football on the Cougars' varsity from 1948 through 1950. He played on both offense as a center and on defense as a linebacker. Torgeson was the team captain in 1950, and he was selected by the Associated Press (AP) as the first-team center on the All-Coast team.

The morning of Torgeson's final game as a Cougar, the annual rivalry game with Washington in Spokane, his younger brother Robert, a sophomore at Washington State, died from carbon monoxide poisoning while sleeping in a parked car after traveling from Pullman to watch the game.

== Professional football ==
Torgeson was selected by the Detroit Lions in the fifth round (58th overall pick) of the 1951 NFL draft. As a rookie, he appeared in all 12 games for the Lions, playing at both the linebacker and center positions. From 1952 to 1954, he played at the right linebacker position for the Lions. During the Lions' NFL championship seasons in 1952 and 1953, he had ten interceptions, including a 31-yard interception return for touchdown against the Los Angeles Rams on October 19, 1952.

In late January 1955, the Lions traded Torgeson and Jim Hill to the Washington Redskins in exchange for Walt Yowarsky and Jim Ricca. Torgeson played for the Redskins from 1955 to 1957, appearing in 35 games. He was released by the team in September 1958.

== Coaching career ==
In September 1959, Toregson announced that he was retiring as a player and had been hired as an assistant coach with the Redskins. He was with the Redskins from 1959 to 1961.

In January 1962, Torgeson left the Redskins to become an assistant coach with the Pittsburgh Steelers under his former Lions head coach Buddy Parker. He remained with the Steelers from 1962 to 1968.

In February 1969, Torgeson was hired by the Los Angeles Rams as their defensive line coach under head coach George Allen. He remained with the Rams for the 1969 and 1970 seasons. In those two years under Allen and Torgeson, the Rams compiled a 20–7–1 record.

In 1971, Allen left the Rams to become head coach of the Washington Redskins. Torgeson followed Allen and became the Redskins' defensive coordinator from 1971 to 1977. During seven seasons under Allen and Torgeson, the Redskins compiled a 67–30–1 record; they won the conference title in 1972 (but lost Super Bowl VII to the Miami Dolphins in January 1973).

In February 1978, Allen returned to the Los Angeles Rams, and Torgeson followed him as an assistant coach, but Allen was fired in mid-August. Torgeson remained with the Rams under newly-promoted head coach Ray Malavasi for three years, through the 1980 season. They compiled a 12–4 record in 1978, won the NFC championship in 1979 (but lost Super Bowl XIV in January 1980), and were 11–5 in 1980.

In February 1981, Torgeson returned to the Redskins as defensive line coach. He remained with the Redskins for 13 years, through the 1993 season. He was an assistant under head coaches Joe Gibbs from 1981 to 1992 and Richie Petitbon in 1993. During his tenure with the Redskins, the team won Super Bowl XVII in 1983, Super Bowl XXII in 1988, and Super Bowl XXVI in 1992, and lost Super Bowl XVIII in 1984. When Norv Turner took over as head coach of the Redskins in early 1994, Torgeson and several other assistant coaches were dismissed.

Torgeson concluded his coaching career as the defensive coordinator and linebackers coach for the Frankfurt Galaxy in 1996.

== Later life ==
After retiring from coaching, Torgeson lived with his wife Nola (Carmichael) Torgeson in Huntington Beach, California. In 1970, he was inducted into the Washington State University Athletic Hall of Fame. He was also inducted into the State of Washington Sports Hall of Fame in 1994. Torgeson died in 2015 at age 86 in Huntington Beach.
