= Joe Verducci =

American football player, coach, and administrator (1910–1964)

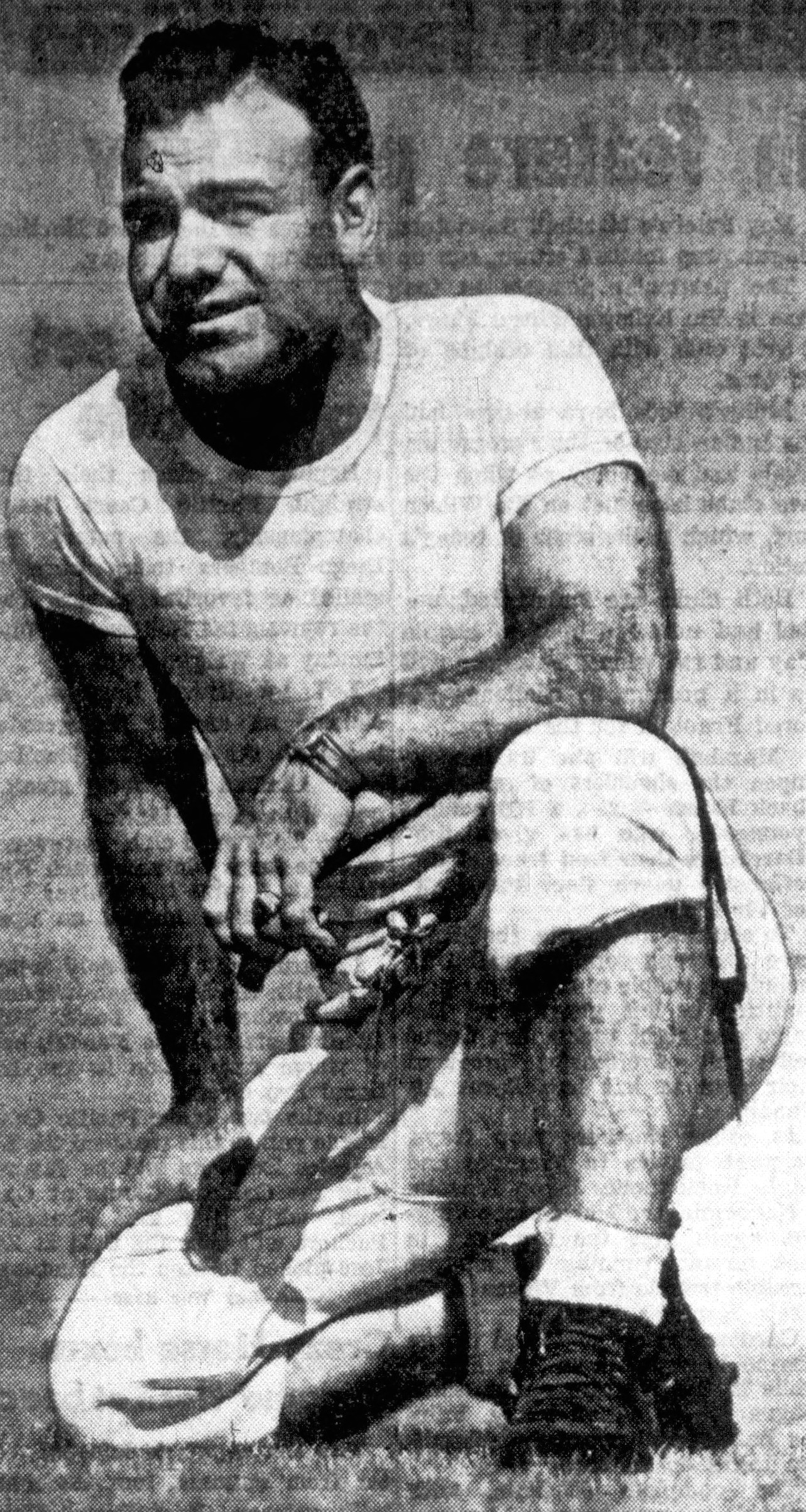
- Verducci, circa 1944

Biographical details
- Born: November 11, 1910; California, U.S.
- Died: November 6, 1964 (aged 53); San Francisco, California, U.S.

Playing career
- 1932–1933: California
- Position: Quarterback

Coaching career (HC unless noted)
- 1936–1937: George Washington HS (CA)
- 1938–1941: San Francisco Poly HS (CA)
- 1942–1944: Alameda Coast Guard
- 1945–1947: San Francisco Poly HS (CA)
- 1948–1949: Saint Mary's
- 1950–1960: San Francisco State

Head coaching record
- Overall: 90–54–5 (college)
- Bowls: 0–1

Accomplishments and honors

Championships
- 6 Far Western (1950, 1954, 1956–1959)

Joseph Jerold Verducci (November 11, 1910 – November 6, 1964) was an American football player, coach, and college athletics administrator. He served as the head football coach at Saint Mary's College of California from 1948 to 1949 and at San Francisco State University from 1950 to 1960; he was also the athletic director at San Francisco State. Verducci was also a member of Daly City's city council and served as its mayor. One of his fellow councilmen was National Football League player Bob St. Clair, whom he coached at San Francisco Polytechnic High School.

He died in November 1964.

== Head coaching record ==
=== College ===
Year	Team	Overall	Conference	Standing	Bowl/playoffs
Alameda Coast Guard Sea Lions (Independent) (1942–1944)
1942	Alameda Coast Guard	1–7–1			
1943	Alameda Coast Guard	4–2–1			
1944	Alameda Coast Guard	4–2–2			
Alameda Coast Guard:		9–11–4			
Saint Mary's Gaels (Independent) (1948–1949)
1948	Saint Mary's	4–6			
1949	Saint Mary's	3–6–1			
Saint Mary's:		7–12–1			
San Francisco State Gators (Far Western Conference) (1950–1960)
1950	San Francisco State	6–2	4–0	1st	L Pear
1951	San Francisco State	8–2	2–0	2nd	
1952	San Francisco State	4–5	1–0	3rd	
1953	San Francisco State	5–3	0–1	4th	
1954	San Francisco State	8–2	5–0	1st	
1955	San Francisco State	5–5	3–2	3rd	
1956	San Francisco State	5–5	4–1	T–1st	
1957	San Francisco State	7–3	5–0	1st	
1958	San Francisco State	7–3	4–1	1st	
1959	San Francisco State	10–0	5–0	1st	
1960	San Francisco State	9–1	4–1	2nd	
San Francisco State:		74–31	37–6		
Total:		90–54–5			
National championship Conference title Conference division title or championship game berth
