= 1950 San Jose State Spartans football team =

American college football season

1950 San Jose State Spartans football
- Conference: Independent
- Record: 6–3–1
- Head coach: Bob Bronzan (1st season)
- Home stadium: Spartan Stadium

1950 Western college football independents records
	Conf.			Overall
Team	W	L	T	W		L		T
Loyola (CA)		–		8	–	1	–	0
Pacific (CA)		–		7	–	3	–	1
San Francisco		–		7	–	4	–	0
San Jose State		–		6	–	3	–	1
Hawaii		–		5	–	4	–	2
Montana		–		5	–	5	–	0
La Verne		–		3	–	5	–	0
Santa Clara		–		3	–	7	–	0
Saint Mary's		–		2	–	7	–	1
Cal Poly San Dimas		–		1	–	6	–	1
Nevada		–		1	–	9	–	0

The 1950 San Jose State Spartans football team represented San Jose State College—now known as San Jose State University—as an independent during the 1950 college football season. Led by first-year head coach Bob Bronzan, the Spartans compiled a record of 6–3–1 and outscored opponents 201 to 118. The team played home games at Spartan Stadium in San Jose, California.

== Schedule ==
Date	Opponent	Site	Result	Attendance	Source
September 23	at No. 7 Stanford	Stanford Stadium; Stanford, CA (rivalry)	L 16–33		
September 29	San Diego State	Spartan Stadium; San Jose, CA	W 26–0	8,000	
October 7	Santa Clara	Spartan Stadium; San Jose, CA	W 14–10	16,190	
October 13	Loyola (CA)	Spartan Stadium; San Jose, CA	L 7–14	11,000	
October 20	at San Francisco	Kezar Stadium; San Francisco, CA	L 0–27	15,208	
October 28	at Pepperdine	Gilmore Stadium; Los Angeles, CA	W 48–7		
November 3	Fresno State	Spartan Stadium; San Jose, CA (rivalry)	W 33–7	8,500	
November 10	Saint Mary's	Spartan Stadium; San Jose, CA	W 18–6	11,000	
November 18	at Pacific (CA)	Pacific Memorial Stadium; Stockton, CA (Victory Bell)	T 7–7	11,000	
November 24	vs. Montana	Honolulu Stadium; Honolulu, HI	W 32–7	12,000	
Rankings from AP Poll released prior to the game

== Team players in the NFL ==
The following San Jose State players were selected in the 1951 NFL draft.

Player	Position	Round	Overall	NFL team
Keith Carpenter	Tackle	26	306	San Francisco 49ers
