= 1950 Loyola Lions football team =

American college football season

1950 Loyola Lions football
- Conference: Independent
- Record: 8–1
- Head coach: Jordan Olivar (2nd season)
- Home stadium: Gilmore Stadium

1950 Western college football independents records
	Conf.			Overall
Team	W	L	T	W		L		T
Loyola (CA)		–		8	–	1	–	0
Pacific (CA)		–		7	–	3	–	1
San Francisco		–		7	–	4	–	0
San Jose State		–		6	–	3	–	1
Hawaii		–		5	–	4	–	2
Montana		–		5	–	5	–	0
La Verne		–		3	–	5	–	0
Santa Clara		–		3	–	7	–	0
Saint Mary's		–		2	–	7	–	1
Cal Poly San Dimas		–		1	–	6	–	1
Nevada		–		1	–	9	–	0

The 1950 Loyola Lions football team was an American football team that represented Loyola University of Los Angeles (now known as Loyola Marymount University) as an independent during the 1950 college football season. In their second season under head coach Jordan Olivar, the Lions compiled an 8–1 record and outscored their opponents by a combined total of 297 to 137. The team ranked fifth in major college football in total offense, tallying an average of 420.1 yards per game.

After starting the season with seven wins, the team was ranked No. 20 in the AP Poll for the next two weeks – the first and only time a Loyola football team was ranked.

Quarterback Don Klosterman was the team's offensive star. He ranked fifth in major college football with 113 pass completions (good for 1,582 yards) and 19 touchdowns. Fred Snyder tallied 36 receptions for 596 yards and nine touchdowns.

As a team, the Lions ranked fourth nationally in passing offense (186.0 yards per game), fifth in total offense (420.1 yards per game), and tenth in rushing defense (106.7 yards per game).

== Schedule ==
Date	Opponent	Rank	Site	Result	Attendance	Source
September 23	Pepperdine		Gilmore Stadium; Los Angeles, CA	W 50–14	11,800	
October 8	Saint Mary's		Gilmore Stadium; Los Angeles, CA	W 48–0	14,569	
October 13	at San Jose State		Spartan Stadium; San Jose, CA	W 14–7	11,000	
October 21	at Pacific (CA)		Pacific Memorial Stadium; Stockton, CA	W 35–33	30,000	
October 28	at Nevada		Mackay Stadium; Reno, NV	W 34–7	7,000	
November 3	Hardin–Simmons		Gilmore Stadium; Los Angeles, CA	W 21–20	18,500	
November 11	at Fresno State		Ratcliffe Stadium; Fresno, CA	W 28–0	9,500	
November 26	at Santa Clara	No. 20	Gilmore Stadium; Los Angeles, CA	L 26–28	15,200	
December 3	San Francisco	No. 20	Gilmore Stadium; Los Angeles, CA	W 40–28	13,000	
Rankings from AP Poll released prior to the game
