= 1950 Utah State Aggies football team =

American college football season

1950 Utah State Aggies football
- Conference: Skyline Conference
- Record: 2–9 (0–5 Skyline)
- Head coach: George Melinkovich (2nd season)
- Home stadium: Romney Stadium

1950 Skyline Conference football standings
	Conf.					Overall
Team	W		L		T	W		L		T
No. 12 Wyoming $	5	–	0	–	0	10	–	0	–	0
Colorado A&M	4	–	1	–	0	6	–	3	–	0
Denver	2	–	2	–	1	3	–	8	–	1
Utah	1	–	2	–	2	3	–	4	–	3
BYU	1	–	3	–	1	4	–	5	–	1
Utah State	0	–	5	–	0	2	–	9	–	0
$ – Conference champion; Rankings from AP Poll

The 1950 Utah State Aggies football team was an American football team that represented Utah State University in the Skyline Conference during the 1950 college football season. In their second and final season under head coach George Melinkovich, the Aggies compiled a 2–9 record (0–5 against Skyline opponents), finished last in the Skyline Conference, and were outscored by opponents by a total of 374 to 107. On defense, the team allowed an average of 34 points per game, ranking 117th out of 120 major college teams.

== Schedule ==
Date	Opponent	Site	Result	Attendance	Source
September 16	Nevada*	Romney Stadium; Logan, UT	W 7–6		
September 23	Washington State*	Romney Stadium; Logan, UT	L 6–46	5,000	
September 30	at Wichita*	Veterans Field; Wichita, KS	L 20–49	8,457	
October 7	at Montana State*	Gatton Field; Bozeman, MT	W 34–6		
October 14	Wyoming	Romney Stadium; Logan, UT (rivalry)	L 7–40	10,000	
October 21	at Arizona State*	Goodwin Stadium; Tempe, AZ	L 0–28		
October 28	Colorado A&M	Romney Stadium; Logan, UT	L 13–33		
November 4	BYU	Romney Stadium; Logan, UT (rivalry)	L 13–34	5,000	
November 11	at Denver	Hilltop Stadium; Denver, CO	L 0–48	7,960	
November 18	at Montana*	Dornblaser Field; Missoula, MT	L 7–38	4,500	
November 23	at Utah	Ute Stadium; Salt Lake City, UT (rivalry)	L 0–46	16,108	
*Non-conference game
