= 1950 Nevada Wolf Pack football team =

American college football season

1950 Nevada Wolf Pack football
- Conference: Independent
- Record: 1–9
- Head coach: Joe Sheeketski (4th season)
- Home stadium: Mackay Stadium

1950 Western college football independents records
	Conf.			Overall
Team	W	L	T	W		L		T
Loyola (CA)		–		8	–	1	–	0
Pacific (CA)		–		7	–	3	–	1
San Francisco		–		7	–	4	–	0
San Jose State		–		6	–	3	–	1
Hawaii		–		5	–	4	–	2
Montana		–		5	–	5	–	0
La Verne		–		3	–	5	–	0
Santa Clara		–		3	–	7	–	0
Saint Mary's		–		2	–	7	–	1
Cal Poly San Dimas		–		1	–	6	–	1
Nevada		–		1	–	9	–	0

The 1950 Nevada Wolf Pack football team was an American football team that represented the University of Nevada as an independent during the 1950 college football season. In its fourth season under head coach Joe Sheeketski, the Wolf Pack compiled a 1–9 record and were outscored by opponents by a total of 363 to 117. Sheeketski resigned as athletic director and head coach.

== Schedule ==
Date	Opponent	Site	Result	Attendance	Source
September 16	at Utah State	Romney Stadium; Logan, UT	L 6–7		
September 23	vs. Texas A&M	Charles C. Hughes Stadium; Sacramento, CA	L 18–48	10,000	
October 8	at San Francisco	Kezar Stadium; San Francisco, CA	L 6–66	35,000	
October 14	Pacific (CA)	Mackay Stadium; Reno, NV	L 7–43		
October 22	vs. Santa Clara	Charles C. Hughes Stadium; Sacramento, CA	L 0–55	6,000	
October 28	Loyola (CA)	Mackay Stadium; Reno, NV	L 7–34	7,000	
November 5	at Saint Mary's	Kezar Stadium; San Francisco, CA	L 14–25	6,276	
November 11	Montana	Mackay Stadium; Reno, NV	W 19–14	3,500	
November 18	at North Texas State	Eagle Field; Denton, TX	L 21–34		
November 23	at Wichita	Cessna Stadium; Wichita, KS	L 19–37		
