= 1950 BYU Cougars football team =

American college football season

1950 BYU Cougars football
- Conference: Skyline Conference
- Record: 4–5–1 (1–3–1 Skyline Six)
- Head coach: Chick Atkinson (2nd season)
- Home stadium: Cougar Stadium

1950 Skyline Conference football standings
	Conf.					Overall
Team	W		L		T	W		L		T
No. 12 Wyoming $	5	–	0	–	0	10	–	0	–	0
Colorado A&M	4	–	1	–	0	6	–	3	–	0
Denver	2	–	2	–	1	3	–	8	–	1
Utah	1	–	2	–	2	3	–	4	–	3
BYU	1	–	3	–	1	4	–	5	–	1
Utah State	0	–	5	–	0	2	–	9	–	0
$ – Conference champion; Rankings from AP Poll

The 1950 BYU Cougars football team was an American football team that represented Brigham Young University (BYU) as a member of the Skyline Conference during the 1950 college football season. In their second season under head coach Chick Atkinson, the Cougars compiled an overall record of 4–5–1 with a mark of 1–3–1 against conference opponents, finished fifth in the Skyline, and were outscored by a total of 292 to 169.

== Schedule ==
Date	Opponent	Site	Result	Attendance	Source
September 16	at Idaho State*	Spud Bowl; Pocatello, ID	W 14–13		
September 23	Arizona State*	Cougar Stadium; Provo, UT	L 41–13	9,000	
September 29	Pepperdine*	Cougar Stadium; Provo, UT	W 28–27	6,500	
October 7	Utah	Cougar Stadium; Provo, UT (rivalry)	T 28–28		
October 14	at Colorado A&M	Colorado Field; Fort Collins, CO	L 27–14	11,500	
October 21	at Denver	DU Stadium; Denver, CO	L 42–3	11,000	
November 4	at Utah State	Romney Stadium; Logan, UT (rivalry)	W 34–13	5,000	
November 11	No. 14 Wyoming^{†}	Cougar Stadium; Provo, UT	L 48–0		
November 17	at Hawaii*	Honolulu Stadium; Honolulu, Territory of Hawaii	L 7–39	12,000	
November 25	Fort Hood*	Cougar Stadium; Provo, UT	W 28–14	2,000	
*Non-conference game; ^{†}Homecoming; Rankings from AP Poll released prior to the game
