= 1950 San Francisco Dons football team =

American college football season

1950 San Francisco Dons football
- Conference: Independent
- Record: 7–4
- Head coach: Joe Kuharich (3rd season)
- Home stadium: Kezar Stadium

1950 Western college football independents records
	Conf.			Overall
Team	W	L	T	W		L		T
Loyola (CA)		–		8	–	1	–	0
Pacific (CA)		–		7	–	3	–	1
San Francisco		–		7	–	4	–	0
San Jose State		–		6	–	3	–	1
Hawaii		–		5	–	4	–	2
Montana		–		5	–	5	–	0
La Verne		–		3	–	5	–	0
Santa Clara		–		3	–	7	–	0
Saint Mary's		–		2	–	7	–	1
Cal Poly San Dimas		–		1	–	6	–	1
Nevada		–		1	–	9	–	0

The 1950 San Francisco Dons football team was an American football team that represented the University of San Francisco as an independent during the 1950 college football season. In their third season under head coach Joe Kuharich, the Dons compiled a 7–4 record and outscored their opponents by a combined total of 291 to 181. The team ranked 10th in major college football in total defense, allowing an average of only 203.6 yards per game.

== Schedule ==
Date	Opponent	Site	Result	Attendance	Source
September 23	Tulsa	Kezar Stadium; San Francisco, CA	W 23–14	15,015	
September 30	at No. 7 Stanford	Stanford Stadium; Stanford, CA	L 7–55	35,000	
October 8	Nevada	Kezar Stadium; San Francisco, CA	W 66–6	11,112	
October 14	Saint Mary's	Kezar Stadium; San Francisco, CA	W 33–7	20,000	
October 20	San Jose State	Kezar Stadium; San Francisco, CA	W 27–0	15,208	
October 28	at Fordham	Polo Grounds; New York, NY	L 14–21	11,000	
November 4	at Denver	Hilltop Stadium; Denver, CO	W 24–6	9,738	
November 11	Santa Clara	Kezar Stadium; San Francisco, CA	W 27–6	13,567	
November 18	at No. 4 California	California Memorial Stadium; Berkeley, CA	L 7–13	14,000	
November 26	Detroit	Kezar Stadium; San Francisco, CA	W 35–13	11,783	
December 3	at No. 20 Loyola (CA)	Gilmore Stadium; Los Angeles, CA	L 28–4	13,000	
Rankings from AP Poll released prior to the game
