= 1950 Wyoming Cowboys football team =

American college football season

1950 Wyoming Cowboys football

Skyline champion Gator Bowl champion

Gator Bowl, W 20–7 vs. Washington and Lee
- Conference: Skyline Conference

Ranking
- Coaches: No. 14
- AP: No. 12
- Record: 10–0 (5–0 Skyline)
- Head coach: Bowden Wyatt (4th season)
- Captain: Dick Campbell
- Home stadium: War Memorial Stadium

1950 Skyline Conference football standings
	Conf.					Overall
Team	W		L		T	W		L		T
No. 12 Wyoming $	5	–	0	–	0	10	–	0	–	0
Colorado A&M	4	–	1	–	0	6	–	3	–	0
Denver	2	–	2	–	1	3	–	8	–	1
Utah	1	–	2	–	2	3	–	4	–	3
BYU	1	–	3	–	1	4	–	5	–	1
Utah State	0	–	5	–	0	2	–	9	–	0
$ – Conference champion; Rankings from AP Poll

The 1950 Wyoming Cowboys football team represented the University of Wyoming in the Skyline Conference during the 1950 college football season. In their fourth season under head coach Bowden Wyatt, the Cowboys compiled a perfect 10–0 record (5–0 against Skyline opponents), won the Skyline Conference championship, ranked No. 12 in the final AP poll, defeated Washington and Lee in the 1951 Gator Bowl, and outscored all opponents by a total of 363 to 59. The team ranked third in major college football in total defense, allowing an average of only 173.2 yards per game.

Halfback Eddie Talboom scored 130 points (15 touchdowns, 40 points after touchdown) and received All-American honors after the 1950 season. He was recognized as a first-team offense player by the International News Service and as a second-team player on offense by the Associated Press.

In 2000, Talboom became the first player in Wyoming program history to be inducted into the College Football Hall of Fame. Head coach Bowden Wyatt was also inducted into the College Football Hall of Fame as a coach in 1997.

== Schedule ==
Date	Opponent	Rank	Site	Result	Attendance	Source
September 16	Montana State*		War Memorial Stadium; Laramie, WY	W 61–13	5,500	
September 23	Baylor*		War Memorial Stadium; Laramie, WY	W 7–0	17,268	
October 7	Colorado A&M^{†}		War Memorial Stadium; Laramie, WY (rivalry)	W 34–0	19,656	
October 14	at Utah State		Aggie Stadium; Logan, UT (rivalry)	W 40–7	10,000	
October 21	at Utah		Ute Stadium; Salt Lake City, UT	W 53–13	22,325	
October 28	New Mexico*		War Memorial Stadium; Laramie, WY	W 44–0		
November 4	at Idaho*	No. 18	Neale Stadium; Moscow, ID	W 14–7	9,000	
November 11	at BYU	No. 14	Cougar Stadium; Provo, UT	W 48–0		
November 23	at Denver	No. 12	DU Stadium; Denver, CO	W 42–12	28,700	
January 1, 1951	vs. No. 18 Washington & Lee*	No. 12	Gator Bowl; Jacksonville, FL (Gator Bowl)	W 20–7	26,354	
*Non-conference game; ^{†}Homecoming; Rankings from AP Poll released prior to the game
