= 1950 USC Trojans football team =

American college football season

1950 USC Trojans football
- Conference: Pacific Coast Conference
- Record: 2–5–2 (1–3–2 PCC)
- Head coach: Jeff Cravath (9th season)
- Home stadium: Los Angeles Memorial Coliseum

1950 Pacific Coast Conference football standings
	Conf.					Overall
Team	W		L		T	W		L		T
No. 5 California $	5	–	0	–	1	9	–	1	–	1
No. 11 Washington	6	–	1	–	0	8	–	2	–	0
UCLA	5	–	2	–	0	6	–	3	–	0
Stanford	2	–	2	–	2	5	–	3	–	2
Idaho	1	–	1	–	1	3	–	5	–	1
Washington State	2	–	3	–	2	4	–	3	–	2
USC	1	–	3	–	2	2	–	5	–	2
Oregon State	2	–	5	–	0	3	–	6	–	0
Oregon	0	–	7	–	0	1	–	9	–	0
$ – Conference champion; Rankings from AP Poll

The 1950 USC Trojans football team represented the University of Southern California (USC) in the 1950 college football season. In their ninth year under head coach Jeff Cravath, the Trojans compiled a 2–5–2 record (1–3–2 against conference opponents), finished in seventh place in the Pacific Coast Conference, and were outscored by their opponents by a combined total of 182 to 114.

Wilbur Robertson led the team in passing with 50 of 106 passes completed for 492 yards, one touchdown and eight interceptions. Al Carmichael led the team in rushing with 103 carries for 514 yards and two touchdowns. Harold Hatford was the leading receiver with 22 catches for 192 yards and one touchdown.

Three Trojans received honors from the Associated Press (AP), United Press (UP), or conference coaches on the 1950 All-Pacific Coast Conference football team: Johnny Williams, USC (Coaches-1 [defensive back]); Volney Peters, USC (AP-1 [defensive tackle]; Coaches-1 [offensive and defensive tackle]; UP-1); and Paul McMurtry, USC (Coaches-1 [guard]).

== Schedule ==
Date	Opponent	Rank	Site	Result	Attendance	Source
September 29	Iowa*	No. 12	Los Angeles Memorial Coliseum; Los Angeles, CA	L 14–20	45,167	
October 7	at Washington State		Rogers Field; Pullman, WA	T 20–20	16,000	
October 14	No. 7 California		Los Angeles Memorial Coliseum; Los Angeles, CA	L 7–13	55,468	
October 21	vs. Navy*		Memorial Stadium; Baltimore, MD	L 14–27	24,300	
October 28	Oregon		Los Angeles Memorial Coliseum; Los Angeles, CA	W 30–21	27,008	
November 4	at Stanford		Stanford Stadium; Stanford, CA (rivalry)	T 7–7	40,000	
November 18	No. 19 Washington		Los Angeles Memorial Coliseum; Los Angeles, CA	L 13–28	23,442	
November 25	at UCLA		Los Angeles Memorial Coliseum; Los Angeles, CA (Victory Bell)	L 0–39	51,906	
December 2	Notre Dame*^{†}		Los Angeles Memorial Coliseum; Los Angeles, CA (rivalry)	W 9–7	70,177	
*Non-conference game; ^{†}Homecoming; Rankings from AP Poll released prior to the game; Source:

== Coaching staff ==
- Head coach: Jeff Cravath
- Assistant coaches: Ray George (line coach), Roy "Bullet" Baker (backfield coach), Sam Barry (head scout), Bill Fisk (end coach), Walter Hargesheimer (backfield coach), Mike Milligan (line coach), Harry Smith (freshman coach)

== Roster ==
- HB #16 Frank Gifford, Jr.
