= 1950 Montana State Bobcats football team =

American college football season

1950 Montana State Bobcats football
- Conference: Rocky Mountain Conference
- Record: 1–8 (1–3 RMC)
- Head coach: John Mason (1st season)
- Home stadium: Gatton Field

1950 Rocky Mountain Conference football standings
	Conf.					Overall
Team	W		L		T	W		L		T
Colorado College $	5	–	0	–	0	9	–	1	–	0
Colorado State–Greeley	3	–	2	–	0	6	–	2	–	1
Idaho State	3	–	2	–	0	4	–	4	–	0
Western State (CO)	2	–	3	–	0	4	–	4	–	0
Montana State	1	–	3	–	0	1	–	8	–	0
Colorado Mines	0	–	4	–	0	3	–	6	–	0
$ – Conference champion

The 1950 Montana State Bobcats football team was an American football team that represented Montana State University in the Rocky Mountain Conference (RMC) during the 1950 college football season. In its first season under head coach John Mason, the team compiled a 1–8 record.

== Schedule ==
Date	Opponent	Site	Result	Attendance	Source
September 16	at Wyoming*	War Memorial Stadium; Laramie, WY	L 13–61	5,500	
September 23	Western State (CO)	Gatton Field; Bozeman, MT	L 13–26		
September 30	vs. Eastern Washington*	Memorial Stadium; Great Falls, MT	L 6–20		
October 7	Utah State*	Gatton Field; Bozeman, MT	L 6–34		
October 14	at Colorado State–Greeley	Jackson Field; Greeley, CO	W 18–7		
October 21	Montana*	Gatton Field; Bozeman, MT (rivalry)	L 12–34		
October 28	Colorado College^{†}	Gatton Field; Bozeman, MT	L 18–34		
November 4	vs. North Dakota State*	Glendive, MT	L 0–27		
November 12	Idaho State	Gatton Field; Bozeman, MT	L 13–39		
*Non-conference game; ^{†}Homecoming
