= Chick Atkinson =

American football coach (1918–1962)

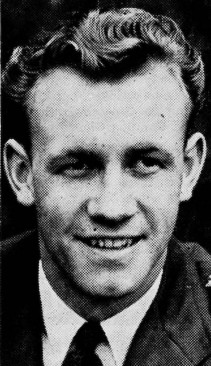
- Atkinson, circa 1954

Biographical details
- Born: January 16, 1918; Pocatello, Idaho, U.S.
- Died: January 4, 1962 (aged 43); Salt Lake City, Utah, U.S.

Playing career

Football
- 1938–1940: Idaho

Basketball
- 1938–1940: Idaho

Coaching career (HC unless noted)

Football
- 1949–1955: BYU

Head coaching record
- Overall: 18–49–3

Charles L. "Chick" Atkinson (January 16, 1918 – January 4, 1962) was an American football coach. He served as the head football coach at Brigham Young University (BYU) from 1949 to 1955, compiling a record of 18–49–3. This included an 0–11 record in 1949.

Atkinson was a native of Pocatello, Idaho. In high school, he was all-state in football and basketball. He graduated from the University of Idaho, where was the captain of the football and basketball teams. Prior to his tenure at BYU, Atkinson coached football at Pocatello High School, where his record was 38–11. He died in 1962 at the age of 43 of a possible stroke.

== Head coaching record ==
Year	Team	Overall	Conference	Standing	Bowl/playoffs
BYU Cougars (Skyline Six / Skyline Conference) (1949–1955)
1949	BYU	0–11	0–5	6th	
1950	BYU	4–5–1	1–3–1	5th	
1951	BYU	6–3–1	2–3–1	5th	
1952	BYU	4–6	3–4	5th	
1953	BYU	2–7–1	1–5–1	T–7th	
1954	BYU	1–8	1–6	8th	
1955	BYU	1–9	0–7	8th	
BYU:		18–49–3	8–33–3		
Total:		18–49–3			
