= Bob Davis (American football coach) =

American football player and coach (1908–1965)

Biographical details
- Born: February 13, 1908; Salt Lake City, Utah, U.S.
- Died: January 10, 1965 (aged 56); Fort Collins, Colorado, U.S.

Playing career
- 1928–1929: Utah
- Position: Quarterback

Coaching career (HC unless noted)
- 1931: South HS (UT) (assistant)
- 1932–1935: South HS (UT)
- 1937–1942: Weber
- 1946: Denver (assistant)
- 1947–1955: Colorado A&M

Administrative career (AD unless noted)
- 1953–1965: Colorado A&M/State

Head coaching record
- Overall: 54–33–2 (college)
- Bowls: 0–1

Accomplishments and honors

Championships
- 2 Intermountain Junior College (1937–1938); 1 Skyline (1955)

Awards
- 2× Skyline Six / Skyline Coach of the Year (1948, 1955)

Robert L. Davis (February 13, 1908 – January 10, 1965) was an American football coach. He served as the head football coach at Colorado State College of Agriculture and Mechanic Arts—now known as Colorado State University—from 1947 to 1955. Davis was born and raised in Salt Lake City, Utah and played his collegiate football at the University of Utah under Ike Armstrong. Quarterback and team captain in 1929, Davis lead Utah to the conference championship, graduating in 1930. He coached at South Salt Lake City High School, Weber Junior College, and was an assistant coach at the University of Utah and the University of Denver before being named as the head coach of football at Colorado A&M College on January 6, 1947.

Davis utilized the T formation and veterans returning from World War II to turn around a 2–7 Aggies team in 1946 to an 8–2 team in 1948; placing second in the Skyline Conference. Upon turning the Aggies around in 1948, Colorado A&M was invited to and played in the 1949 Raisin Bowl in Fresno, California against Occidental. Only losing 21–20 in the last minutes of the game, Davis' 1949 team went on to a 9–1 record and placed second again. Davis was a revolutionary coach utilizing classroom football along with practice and game films to help his players excel. Davis also played black athletes, such as Eddie Hanna, George Jones and Alex Burl, in a predominantly white school.

Several of Davis' players went on to play in the National Football League (NFL), including Dale Dodrill, Thurman "Fum" McGraw, Jim David, Don Burroughs, Jack Christiansen, Alex Burl and Gary Glick. Three of his players were All-Americans; Thurman "Fum" Mcgraw (first team 1948, 1949), Harvey Achziger (first team 1952) and Gary Glick (second team 1955). Davis' 1955 team won the Skyline Conference championship, but following the season he resigned from coaching football to concentrate on his duties as athletic director, a post he had held since 1953. His departure began a four-decade downturn in the Rams' fortunes; he was the last coach to leave Fort Collins with a winning record until Sonny Lubick's tenure.

Davis continued as athletic director when Colorado A&M became Colorado State University in 1957 and is responsible for paving the way to construct Moby Arena and Hughes Stadium during the campus' rebirth. Davis died while serving as athletic director on January 10, 1965, following a lengthy illness.

== Head coaching record ==
=== College ===
Year	Team	Overall	Conference	Standing	Bowl/playoffs
Colorado A&M Aggies (Mountain States / Skyline Six / Skyline Conference) (1947–1955)
1947	Colorado A&M	5–4–1	2–3–1	5th	
1948	Colorado A&M	8–3	4–1	2nd	L Raisin
1949	Colorado A&M	9–1	4–1	2nd	
1950	Colorado A&M	6–3	4–1	2nd	
1951	Colorado A&M	5–4–1	3–3–1	4th	
1952	Colorado A&M	6–4	5–2	3rd	
1953	Colorado A&M	4–5	3–4	5th	
1954	Colorado A&M	3–7	3–4	6th	
1955	Colorado A&M	8–2	6–1	1st	
Colorado A&M:		54–33–2	34–20–2		
Total:		54–33–2			
National championship Conference title Conference division title or championship game berth
