= 1950 Colorado A&M Aggies football team =

American college football season

1950 Colorado A&M Aggies football
- Conference: Skyline Conference
- Record: 6–3 (4–1 Skyline)
- Head coach: Bob Davis (4th season)
- Home stadium: Colorado Field

1950 Skyline Conference football standings
	Conf.					Overall
Team	W		L		T	W		L		T
No. 12 Wyoming $	5	–	0	–	0	10	–	0	–	0
Colorado A&M	4	–	1	–	0	6	–	3	–	0
Denver	2	–	2	–	1	3	–	8	–	1
Utah	1	–	2	–	2	3	–	4	–	3
BYU	1	–	3	–	1	4	–	5	–	1
Utah State	0	–	5	–	0	2	–	9	–	0
$ – Conference champion; Rankings from AP Poll

The 1950 Colorado A&M Aggies football team represented Colorado State College of Agriculture and Mechanic Arts in the Skyline Conference during the 1950 college football season. In their fourth season under head coach Bob Davis, the Aggies compiled a 6–3 record (4–1 against Skyline opponents), finished second in the Skyline Conference, and outscored all opponents by a total of 215 to 141.

Four Colorado Agricultural players received all-conference honors in 1950: guard Dale Dodrill, tackle Frank McKiben, halfback Jack Christiansen, and tackle Cliff Hoelzer. Christiansen later played eight seasons as a safety and return specialist with the Detroit Lions and was inducted into the Pro Football Hall of Fame. Dodrill played nine seasons as a defensive tackle with the Pittsburgh Steelers.

== Schedule ==
Date	Opponent	Site	Result	Attendance	Source
September 23	at Denver	Hilltop Stadium; Denver, CO	W 30–14	27,000	
September 30	Colorado College*	Colorado Field; Fort Collins, CO	W 48–7		
October 7	at Wyoming	War Memorial Stadium; Laramie, WY (rivalry)	L 0–34	19,656	
October 14	BYU^{†}	Colorado Field; Fort Collins, CO	W 27–14	11,500	
October 28	at Utah State	Romney Stadium; Logan, UT	W 33–13		
November 4	at Colorado Mines*	Brooks Field; Golden, CO	W 26–0		
November 11	Utah	Colorado Field; Fort Collins, CO	W 32–7		
November 18	at Arizona State*	Goodwin Stadium; Tempe, AZ	L 13–21		
November 25	Colorado*	Colorado Field; Fort Collins, CO (rivalry)	L 6–31	14,500	
*Non-conference game; ^{†}Homecoming
