= 1950 Montana Grizzlies football team =

American college football season

1950 Montana Grizzlies football
- Conference: Independent
- Record: 5–5
- Head coach: Ted Shipkey (2nd season)
- Home stadium: Dornblaser Field

1950 Western college football independents records
	Conf.			Overall
Team	W	L	T	W		L		T
Loyola (CA)		–		8	–	1	–	0
Pacific (CA)		–		7	–	3	–	1
San Francisco		–		7	–	4	–	0
San Jose State		–		6	–	3	–	1
Hawaii		–		5	–	4	–	2
Montana		–		5	–	5	–	0
La Verne		–		3	–	5	–	0
Santa Clara		–		3	–	7	–	0
Saint Mary's		–		2	–	7	–	1
Cal Poly San Dimas		–		1	–	6	–	1
Nevada		–		1	–	9	–	0

The 1950 Montana Grizzlies football team represented the University of Montana in the 1950 college football season. The Grizzlies were led by second-year head coach Ted Shipkey, played their home games at Dornblaser Field and finished the season with a record of five wins and five losses (5–5).

This was Montana's first season out of the Pacific Coast Conference and they competed as an independent; they played four PCC opponents, one more than the previous year. Montana joined the Skyline Conference for the 1951 season.

== Schedule ==
Date	Time	Opponent	Site	Result	Attendance	Source
September 23		at Eastern Washington	Woodward Field; Cheney, WA (rivalry)	W 52–0		
September 30		at Idaho	Neale Stadium; Moscow, ID (Little Brown Stein)	W 28–27	10,000	
October 7	2:30 p.m.	at Oregon	Hayward Field; Eugene, OR	L 13–21		
October 14		Washington State	Dornblaser Field; Missoula, MT	L 7–14	8,000	
October 21		vs. Montana State	Naranche Stadium; Butte, MT (rivalry)	W 33–0		
October 28		at Oregon State	Bell Field; Corvallis, OR	L 0–20	4,000	
November 4		Puget Sound	Dornblaser Field; Missoula, MT	W 35–7		
November 11		at Nevada	Mackay Stadium; Reno, NV	L 14–19	3,500	
November 18		Utah State^{†}	Dornblaser Field; Missoula, MT	W 38–7	4,500	
November 24		vs. San Jose State	Honolulu Stadium; Honolulu, Territory of Hawaii	L 7–32	12,000	
^{†}Homecoming; All times are in Mountain time

== After the season ==
The following Grizzlies were selected in the 1951 NFL draft after the season.

Round	Pick	Player	Position	NFL club
14	161	Ray Bauer	End	Green Bay Packers
22	264	Bob Hanson	Guard	Chicago Bears
24	281	Tom Kingsford	Back	San Francisco 49ers
