= 1950 Fresno State Bulldogs football team =

American college football season

1950 Fresno State Bulldogs football
- Conference: California Collegiate Athletic Association
- Record: 2–6–1 (1–2–1 CCAA)
- Head coach: Duke Jacobs (1st season)
- Home stadium: Ratcliffe Stadium

1950 California Collegiate Athletic Association football standings
	Conf.					Overall
Team	W		L		T	W		L		T
San Diego State $	3	–	0	–	1	5	–	3	–	1
Santa Barbara	3	–	1	–	0	7	–	3	–	0
Pepperdine	2	–	2	–	0	4	–	5	–	0
Fresno State	1	–	2	–	1	2	–	6	–	1
Cal Poly	0	–	4	–	0	3	–	7	–	0
$ – Conference champion

The 1950 Fresno State Bulldogs football team represented Fresno State College—now known as California State University, Fresno—as a member of the California Collegiate Athletic Association (CCAA) during the 1950 college football season. The team was led by first-year head coach Duke Jacobs and played home games at Ratcliffe Stadium on the campus of Fresno City College in Fresno, California. They finished the season with a record of two wins, six losses and one tie (2–6–1, 1–2–1 CCAA).

== Schedule ==
Date	Opponent	Site	Result	Attendance	Source
September 23	at Cal Poly	Mustang Stadium; San Luis Obispo, CA	W 31–7	5,000	
October 6	Hawaii*	Ratcliffe Stadium; Fresno, CA (rivalry)	W 34–20	9,218	
October 13	Santa Barbara	Ratcliffe Stadium; Fresno, CA	L 7–13	10,005	
October 21	at San Diego State	Aztec Bowl; San Diego, CA (rivalry)	T 20–20	6,000	
October 28	Pacific (CA)*	Ratcliffe Stadium; Fresno, CA	L 7–52	10,661	
November 3	at San Jose State*	Spartan Stadium; San Jose, CA (rivalry)	L 7–33	8,500	
November 11	Loyola (CA)*	Ratcliffe Stadium; Fresno, CA	L 0–28	6,471	
November 18	at Pepperdine	Gilmore Stadium; Los Angeles, CA	L 13–27	500	
November 24	North Texas State*	Ratcliffe Stadium; Fresno, CA	L 12–31	9,000	
*Non-conference game
