= 1950 Chico State Wildcats football team =

American college football season

1950 Chico State Wildcats football
- Conference: Far Western Conference
- Record: 2–6 (2–2 FWC)
- Head coach: Paul J. Smith (1st season)
- Home stadium: Chico High School Stadium

1950 Far Western Conference football standings
	Conf.					Overall
Team	W		L		T	W		L		T
San Francisco State $	4	–	0	–	0	6	–	2	–	0
Cal Aggies	3	–	1	–	0	3	–	5	–	0
Chico State	2	–	2	–	0	2	–	6	–	0
Southern Oregon	1	–	3	–	0	3	–	7	–	0
Humboldt State	0	–	4	–	0	0	–	4	–	1
$ – Conference champion

The 1950 Chico State Wildcats football team represented Chico State College—now known as California State University, Chico—as a member of the Far Western Conference (FWC) during the 1950 college football season. Led by first-year head coach Paul J. Smith, Chico State compiled an overall record of 2–6 with a mark of 2–2 in conference play, placing third in the FWC. The team was outscored by its opponents 157 to 108 for the season. The Wildcats played home games at Chico High School Stadium in Chico, California.

== Schedule ==
Date	Opponent	Site	Result	Source
September 30	Pacific (OR)*	Chico High School Stadium; Chico, CA	L 6–14	
October 7	at Humboldt State	Redwood Bowl; Arcata, CA	W 39–6	
October 10	Willamette*	Chico High School Stadium; Chico, CA	L 6–19	
October 21	Southern Oregon	Chico High School Stadium; Chico, CA	W 7–6	
October 28	at San Francisco State	Cox Stadium; San Francisco, CA	L 6–15	
November 4	at Cal Poly*	Mustang Stadium; San Luis Obispo, CA	L 13–45	
November 11	Naval Air Station Alameda (Note: Naval Air Station Alameda was a Naval Air Station from 1940 to 1997. For many years they fielded a team that played against colleges and other military teams.)*	Chico High School Stadium; Chico, CA	L 24–26	
November 18	Cal Aggies	Chico High School Stadium; Chico, CA	L 7–26	
*Non-conference game
