= 1950 Oregon Ducks football team =

American college football season

1950 Oregon Ducks football
- Conference: Pacific Coast Conference
- Record: 1–9 (0–7 PCC)
- Head coach: Jim Aiken (4th season)
- Captain: Ray Lung
- Home stadium: Hayward Field

1950 Pacific Coast Conference football standings
	Conf.					Overall
Team	W		L		T	W		L		T
No. 5 California $	5	–	0	–	1	9	–	1	–	1
No. 11 Washington	6	–	1	–	0	8	–	2	–	0
UCLA	5	–	2	–	0	6	–	3	–	0
Stanford	2	–	2	–	2	5	–	3	–	2
Idaho	1	–	1	–	1	3	–	5	–	1
Washington State	2	–	3	–	2	4	–	3	–	2
USC	1	–	3	–	2	2	–	5	–	2
Oregon State	2	–	5	–	0	3	–	6	–	0
Oregon	0	–	7	–	0	1	–	9	–	0
$ – Conference champion; Rankings from AP Poll

The 1950 Oregon Ducks football team represented the University of Oregon as a Pacific Coast Conference (PCC) member during the 1950 college football season. In their fourth and final season under head coach Jim Aiken, the Ducks compiled a 1–9 record (0–7 against PCC opponents), finished in last place in the PCC, and were outscored by their opponents 214 to 97.

The Oregon squad — known both as the "Ducks" and the "Webfoots" in the press — played three of its home games at Hayward Field in Eugene, Oregon and two at Multnomah Stadium in Portland.

== Schedule ==
Replete in a shiny leather helmet, Webfoots halfback Hal Cuffel (1929–1959) gets sandwiched by two Cal Bears in the team's meeting at Multnomah Stadium in Portland.

Date	Time	Opponent	Site	Result	Attendance	Source
September 23		at UCLA	Los Angeles Memorial Coliseum; Los Angeles, CA	L 0–28	53,052	
September 30		No. 14 California	Multnomah Stadium; Portland, OR	L 7–28	27,849	
October 7	1:30 p.m.	Montana*	Hayward Field; Eugene, OR	W 21–13	12,211	
October 14		at Idaho	Neale Stadium; Moscow, ID	L 0–14	12,000	
October 21		Saint Mary's*	Hayward Field; Eugene, OR (Governors' Trophy Game)	L 13–18	9,752	
October 28		at USC	Los Angeles Memorial Coliseum; Los Angeles, CA	L 21–30	27,008	
November 4		Washington State	Hayward Field; Eugene, OR	L 13–21	15,176	
November 11		at No. 17 Washington	Husky Stadium; Seattle, WA (rivalry)	L 13–27	33,500	
November 18		at Colorado*	Folsom Field; Boulder, CO	L 7–21	12,223	
November 25		vs. Oregon State	Multnomah Stadium; Portland, OR (Civil War)	L 2–14	26,800	
*Non-conference game; Rankings from AP Poll released prior to the game; Source:
