= George Melinkovich =

American football player and coach (1911–1994)

Biographical details
- Born: July 5, 1911; Utah, U.S.
- Died: May 27, 1994 (aged 82); Los Angeles, California, U.S.

Playing career
- 1932, 1934: Notre Dame
- Positions: Fullback, halfback

Coaching career (HC unless noted)
- 1949–1950: Utah State

Head coaching record
- Overall: 5–16

Accomplishments and honors

Awards
- First-team All-American (1932)

George Joseph Melinkovich (July 5, 1911 – May 27, 1994) was an American football player and coach. He was an All-American fullback at the University of Notre Dame in 1932 and the head football coach at Utah State University from 1949 to 1950.

Melinkovich played high school football in Tooele, Utah, and then played college football for the Notre Dame Fighting Irish in 1931, 1932, and 1934. He was selected by Liberty magazine and Parke H. Davis as a first-team fullback on the 1932 College Football All-America Team.

Melinkovich served as a high school football coach in New Jersey for several years, and he then served as the head coach for the Utah State Aggies football team in 1949 and 1950, compiling a record of 5–16 at Utah State. He also coached football at Judge Memorial Catholic High School in Salt Lake City and later moved to California and worked as a teacher in Los Angeles for 20 years. He was inducted into the Utah Sports Hall of Fame in 1990. He died in 1994 at age 82 in Los Angeles.

== Head coaching record ==
Year	Team	Overall	Conference	Standing	Bowl/playoffs
Utah State Aggies (Skyline Six / Skyline Conference) (1949–1950)
1949	Utah State	3–7	1–3	5th	
1950	Utah State	2–9	0–5	6th	
Utah State:		5–16	1–8		
Total:		5–16			
