= 1950 Oregon State Beavers football team =

American college football season

1950 Oregon State Beavers football
- Head coach Kip Taylor
- Conference: Pacific Coast Conference
- Record: 3–6 (2–5 PCC)
- Head coach: Kip Taylor (2nd season)
- Home stadium: Bell Field; Multnomah Stadium

1950 Pacific Coast Conference football standings
	Conf.					Overall
Team	W		L		T	W		L		T
No. 5 California $	5	–	0	–	1	9	–	1	–	1
No. 11 Washington	6	–	1	–	0	8	–	2	–	0
UCLA	5	–	2	–	0	6	–	3	–	0
Stanford	2	–	2	–	2	5	–	3	–	2
Idaho	1	–	1	–	1	3	–	5	–	1
Washington State	2	–	3	–	2	4	–	3	–	2
USC	1	–	3	–	2	2	–	5	–	2
Oregon State	2	–	5	–	0	3	–	6	–	0
Oregon	0	–	7	–	0	1	–	9	–	0
$ – Conference champion; Rankings from AP Poll

The 1950 Oregon State Beavers football team represented Oregon State College in the Pacific Coast Conference (PCC) during the 1950 college football season. In their second season under head coach Kip Taylor, the Beavers compiled a 3–6 record (2–5 in PCC, eighth), and were outscored 183 to 114. The team played two home games on campus at Bell Field in Corvallis and four at Multnomah Stadium in Portland.

Media guide for the 1950 OSC football season.

== Schedule ==
Date	Opponent	Site	Result	Attendance	Source
September 23	at No. 19 Michigan State*	Macklin Stadium; East Lansing, MI	L 13–38	32,500	
October 7	No. 8 Stanford	Multnomah Stadium; Portland, OR	L 7–21	16,000	
October 14	No. 11 Washington	Multnomah Stadium; Portland, OR	L 6–35	27,876	
October 21	at No. 5 California	California Memorial Stadium; Berkeley, CA	L 0–27	37,000	
October 28	Montana*	Bell Field; Corvallis, OR	W 20–0	4,000	
November 4	at No. 19 UCLA	Los Angeles Memorial Coliseum; Los Angeles, CA	L 13–20	15,323	
November 11	Idaho	Bell Field; Corvallis, OR	W 34–19	8,000–9,000	
November 18	at Washington State	Rogers Field; Pullman, WA	L 7–21	13,000	
November 25	vs. Oregon	Multnomah Stadium; Portland, OR (Civil War)	W 14–2	26,800	
*Non-conference game; Rankings from AP Poll released prior to the game; Source:

== Game summaries ==
=== Oregon ===
- Bob Cornelison 23 Rush, 122 Yds

== Coaching staff ==
- Bump Elliott, backs
- Pete Elliott, ends
- Len Younce, line
- Hal Moe, freshmen
