= Ray Richards (American football) =

American football player and coach (1906–1974)

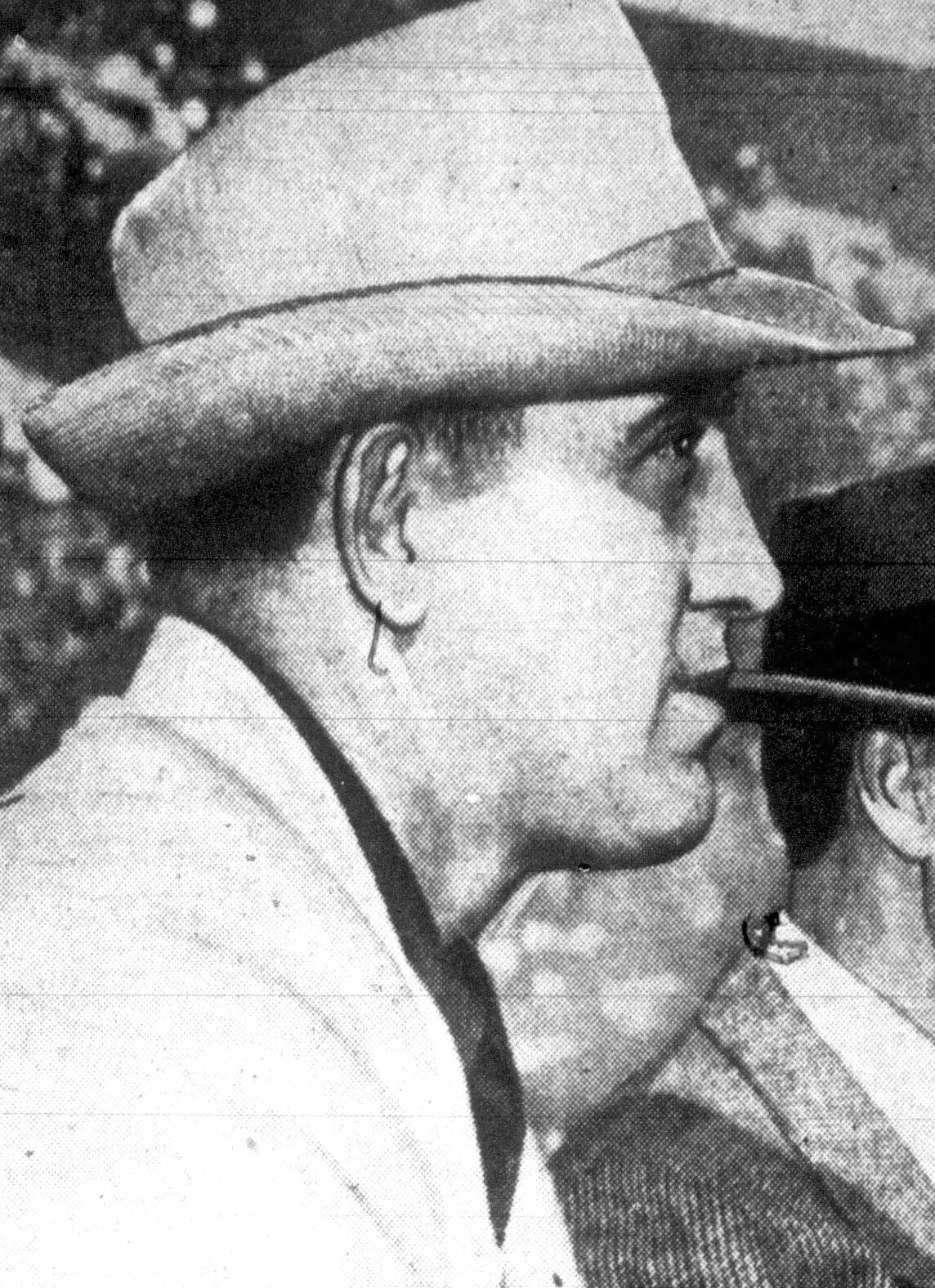
- Richards in 1942

No. 22, 44, 25
- Positions: Tackle, guard, end

Personal information
- Born: July 16, 1906; Liberty, Nebraska, U.S.
- Died: September 18, 1974 (aged 68); Brea, California, U.S.
- Listed height: 6 ft 1 in (1.85 m)
- Listed weight: 230 lb (104 kg)

Career information
- High school: Pawnee City (NE)
- College: Nebraska

Career history

Playing
- Frankford Yellow Jackets (1930); Chicago Bears (1933); Detroit Lions (1934); Chicago Bears (1935–1936); Los Angeles Bulldogs (1936–1937)

Coaching
- Pepperdine (1949–1950) Head coach; Los Angeles Rams (1951–1952); Baltimore Colts (1953); Chicago Cardinals (1955–1957) Head coach; Green Bay Packers (1958)

Awards and highlights
- First-team All-American (1929); First-team All-Big Six (1929); Second-team All-Big Six (1928)

Head coaching record
- Regular season: 14–21 (.400)
- Coaching profile at Pro Football Reference
- Stats at Pro Football Reference

Raymond William Richards (July 16, 1906 – September 18, 1974) was an American football player and coach on both the college and professional levels, including head coach for the Chicago Cardinals of the National Football League (NFL).

Richards was an All-American lineman at the University of Nebraska from 1927 to 1929, then joined the NFL's Frankford Yellow Jackets in 1930. During his playing days, he became known for a notorious move that has since been outlawed: the "lift", in which Richards used his elbow to hit the opposing center as he snapped the ball. Moves such as that helped him in his off-season pursuit of wrestling, an endeavor that saw him travel across the country competing in matches.

Richards played two seasons with the Yellow Jackets until the team disbanded in 1931, then he shifted to Chicago, where he played another two seasons with George Halas's Bears. In 1934, he moved on to play a season with the Detroit Lions, who had just moved from their previous home in Portsmouth, Ohio. After a final season with the Bears the next year, Richards headed west to serve as a player-coach for two seasons with the Los Angeles Bulldogs of the fledgling American Football League, helping the team finish undefeated during his second year.

On April 5, 1937, he was appointed line coach at UCLA, where he served under three different head coaches over the next decade. In an era marked by the looming specter of World War II, Richards was part of two Bruin squads that competed in the Rose Bowl. He resigned on December 11, 1947, and took a similar position in 1948 at nearby Pepperdine University.

One season working with the Waves' linemen led to Richards's promotion to head coach on April 26, 1949. After two seasons in that capacity, he was let go on January 19, 1951, due to budget cuts, but found work seven weeks later as an assistant with the NFL's Los Angeles Rams. During his first year working under close friend Joe Stydahar, the team captured the NFL championship, but then dropped a first-round playoff game in 1952 after Stydahar was fired early in the season.

Richards was dismissed after the season, but was hired by the Baltimore Colts on January 12, 1953. When Stydahar was named head coach of the Chicago Cardinals just weeks later, he attempted to bring Richards along, but NFL commissioner Bert Bell stopped this effort, citing Richards's signed contract with the Colts.

After a disastrous campaign in which the Colts finished 3–9, Richards was among the coaches let go, allowing him to join the Cardinals' staff. The 1954 campaign proved to be even worse as the team won just two of 12 games, giving them a 3–20–1 record under Stydahar's leadership.

That lack of success resulted in a coaching change on June 2, 1955, when Stydahar was fired and Richards was elevated to head coach. Following a 4–7–1 season, the team appeared to be improving with a 7–5 mark in 1956. However, a 3–9 season the year after made another coaching change inevitable, and Richards resigned on January 4, 1958. Among the reasons Richards was unable to fashion a winner was his insistence on playing quarterback Lamar McHan, whose lack of leadership skills were often cited as the team's weak spot.

Richards's last stop came one month later when he was hired as defensive assistant under Ray McLean with the Green Bay Packers. However, a 1–10–1 finish in the 1958 season resulted in Richards announcing his retirement from coaching.

In his post-football career, Richards served as a vice president of Pemaco, Inc., a Los Angeles-based chemical company. He died of lung cancer on September 18, 1974, in Brea, California, at the age of 68.

== Head coaching record ==
=== College ===
Year	Team	Overall	Conference	Standing	Bowl/playoffs
Pepperdine Waves (Independent) (1949)
1949	Pepperdine	4–5			
Pepperdine Waves (California Collegiate Athletic Association) (1950)
1950	Pepperdine	4–5	2–2	3rd	
Pepperdine:		8–10	2–2		
Total:		8–10			
