= 1950 Saint Mary's Gaels football team =

American college football season

1950 Saint Mary's Gaels football
- Conference: Independent
- Record: 2–7–1
- Head coach: Joe Ruetz (1st season)
- Home stadium: Kezar Stadium

1950 Western college football independents records
	Conf.			Overall
Team	W	L	T	W		L		T
Loyola (CA)		–		8	–	1	–	0
Pacific (CA)		–		7	–	3	–	1
San Francisco		–		7	–	4	–	0
San Jose State		–		6	–	3	–	1
Hawaii		–		5	–	4	–	2
Montana		–		5	–	5	–	0
La Verne		–		3	–	5	–	0
Santa Clara		–		3	–	7	–	0
Saint Mary's		–		2	–	7	–	1
Cal Poly San Dimas		–		1	–	6	–	1
Nevada		–		1	–	9	–	0

The 1950 Saint Mary's Gaels football team was an American football team that represented Saint Mary's College of California during the 1950 college football season. In their first season under head coach Joe Ruetz, the Gaels compiled a 2–7–1 record and were outscored by opponents by a combined total of 235 to 95.

The 1950 season saw a financial decline for the program as attendance dropped. No more than 200 paying customers attended the final game of the season against Villanova. The losses flowing from the Villanova game were exacerbated by a $10,000 guarantee paid to the visiting team. The December 3 game was the last in Saint Mary's football until 1970.

On January 4, 1951, one month after the close of the season, Saint Mary's announced that it was abandoning its intercollegiate football and baseball programs for the duration of the national emergency resulting from the Korean War. In addition to the war, the school cited "the growing difficulty of sustaining academic standards in the face of an inflated competition, especially in football." The school also expressed its "profound gratitude to the legions of loyal adherents . . . who have supported the athletic program over the many years that St. Mary's college teams figured prominently in the National sports world."

Two rival programs among the west coast Catholic colleges, Loyola of Los Angeles and San Francisco, terminated their football programs one year later.

== Schedule ==
Date	Opponent	Site	Result	Attendance	Source
September 22	Pacific (CA)	Kezar Stadium; San Francisco, CA	L 0–40	15,451	
September 29	Georgia	Kezar Stadium; San Francisco, CA	T 7–7	7,220	
October 7	Loyola (CA)	Gilmore Stadium; Los Angeles, CA	L 0–48	14,569	
October 14	vs. San Francisco	Kezar Stadium; San Francisco, CA	L 7–33	20,000	
October 21	at Oregon	Hayward Field; Eugene, OR (Governors' Trophy Game)	W 18–13	9,752	
October 28	at No. 5 California	California Memorial Stadium; Berkeley, CA	L 25–40	32,000	
November 5	Nevada	Kezar Stadium; San Francisco, CA	W 25–14	6,276	
November 10	at San Jose State	Spartan Stadium; San Jose, CA	L 6–18	11,000	
November 19	vs. Santa Clara	Kezar Stadium; San Francisco, CA	L 0–9	11,000	
December 3	Villanova	Kezar Stadium; San Francisco, CA	L 7–13	200	
Rankings from AP Poll released prior to the game
