= Joe Ruetz =

American football player, coach, and administrator (1916–2003)

Profile
- Position: Guard

Personal information
- Born: October 21, 1916; Racine, Wisconsin, U.S.
- Died: January 2, 2003 (aged 86); Stanford, California, U.S.
- Listed height: 6 ft 0 in (1.83 m)
- Listed weight: 200 lb (91 kg)

Career information
- High school: South Bend Central (South Bend, Indiana)
- College: Notre Dame

Career history

Playing
- Chicago Rockets (1946); Chicago Rockets (1948)

Coaching
- Saint Mary's Gaels (1950) (head coach)

Operations
- Stanford Cardinal (1972–1978) (athletic director)

Awards and highlights
- Third-team All-American (1937)
- Stats at Pro Football Reference

Joseph Hubert Ruetz (October 21, 1916 – January 2, 2003) was an American football player and coach and college athletics administrator. He played professionally in the All-America Football Conference (AAFC) for the Chicago Rockets in 1946 and 1948. Ruetz played college football while attending the University of Notre Dame. He played guard for the Irish with the exception of one season at quarterback. In 1938, he graduated from Notre Dame with cum laude honors. Ruetz played in the 1938 College All-Star Game and his team upset Sammy Baugh and the Washington Redskins. During World War II, he was a United States Navy physical education instructor and pilot. During that time he played for the famed Saint Mary's Pre-Flight football team. He was named an All-Navy All-American by sportswriter Grantland Rice in 1942. After the war, Ruetz studied at the University of Chicago and played two seasons with the Chicago Rockets of the All-America Football Conference. In 1950, he then was an assistant and head coach at St. Mary's before joining Chuck Taylor's football staff at Stanford University and helping guide the team to the 1952 Rose Bowl. Ruetz later worked as a fundraiser for Cardinal athletics, before succeeding Taylor as athletic director in 1972. He then "saved" the East–West Shrine Game by convincing Stanford to allow it to be played at the school, where it remained until its move to Pacific Bell Park in 2001. Ruetz launched the head coaching career of Bill Walsh in 1977, when he hired him as Stanford's football coach. He also instituted a long football series with Notre Dame, before retiring in 1979. He later served as a fundraising consultant to the Psoriasis Research Institute in Palo Alto, California.

== Biography ==
Ruetz was born on October 21, 1916, in Racine, Wisconsin.

== Head coaching record ==
Year	Team	Overall	Conference	Standing	Bowl/playoffs
Saint Mary's Gaels (Independent) (1950)
1950	Saint Mary's	2–7–1			
Saint Mary's:		2–7–1			
Total:		2–7–1			
