= 1950 Idaho Vandals football team =

American college football season

1950 Idaho Vandals football
- Conference: Pacific Coast Conference
- Record: 3–5–1 (1–1–1 PCC)
- Head coach: Dixie Howell (4th season)
- Captains: Bob Mays; Max Glaves; Vern Baxter
- Home stadium: Neale Stadium

1950 Pacific Coast Conference football standings
	Conf.					Overall
Team	W		L		T	W		L		T
No. 5 California $	5	–	0	–	1	9	–	1	–	1
No. 11 Washington	6	–	1	–	0	8	–	2	–	0
UCLA	5	–	2	–	0	6	–	3	–	0
Stanford	2	–	2	–	2	5	–	3	–	2
Idaho	1	–	1	–	1	3	–	5	–	1
Washington State	2	–	3	–	2	4	–	3	–	2
USC	1	–	3	–	2	2	–	5	–	2
Oregon State	2	–	5	–	0	3	–	6	–	0
Oregon	0	–	7	–	0	1	–	9	–	0
$ – Conference champion; Rankings from AP Poll

The 1950 Idaho Vandals football team represented the University of Idaho in the 1950 college football season. The Vandals were led by fourth-year head coach Dixie Howell and were members of the Pacific Coast Conference. Home games were played on campus at Neale Stadium in Moscow, with one game in Boise at old Bronco Stadium at Boise Junior College, the season opener at the new venue.

Led on the field by quarterbacks Max Glaves and Wayne Anderson, Idaho compiled a 3–5–1 overall record and were 1–1–1 in their three PCC games.

The Vandals broke a 21-game losing streak in the Battle of the Palouse with neighbor Washington State, with a 7–7 tie in the mud at Pullman. But the winless streak against the Cougars was up to 24 games, 0–22–2 since taking three straight in 1923–25; Idaho finally won four years later, also in Pullman.

In the rivalry game with Montana at Neale Stadium four weeks earlier, favored Idaho was upset 27–28 and relinquished the Little Brown Stein. This was the last Montana win in the series for a decade; Idaho won the next eight, through 1959.

Idaho hosted Oregon for homecoming on October 14 and defeated the Ducks for the first time in a quarter century. They also hosted No. 18 Wyoming, but fell by seven points in a scoreless second half; the Cowboys won all nine games and were ranked 12th at the end of the regular season, then won the Gator Bowl.

The Vandals made distant non-conference road trips to El Paso, Boston, and Tempe. The East Coast trip was a day game win in historic Fenway Park, while the other two in the Southwest were night losses. (Idaho had played at Fenway ten years earlier, with much different results.)

== Coaching change ==
After the season in December, Howell and his staff were given one-year contract extensions. Three months later, in late March 1951, university president Jesse Buchanan requested and received the resignations of Howell and two assistants, due to "lack of harmony" on the coaching staff. One of those assistants was ends coach Babe Curfman, who was then asked by the administration to be the interim coach during the upcoming spring drills. He made a good impression and was re-hired as head coach in mid-April.

== Schedule ==
Date	Time	Opponent	Site	Result	Attendance	Source
September 23	1:00 pm	vs. Utah*	old Bronco Stadium; Boise, ID	W 26–19	12,500	
September 30	2:00 pm	Montana*	Neale Stadium; Moscow, ID (Little Brown Stein)	L 27–28	10,000	
October 7	7:15 pm	at Texas Western*	Kidd Field; El Paso, TX	L 33–43		
October 14	2:00 pm	Oregon^{†}	Neale Stadium; Moscow, ID	W 14–0	12,000	
October 28	2:00 pm	at Washington State	Rogers Field; Pullman, WA (Battle of the Palouse)	T 7–7	17,000	
November 4	1:30 pm	No. 18 Wyoming*	Neale Stadium; Moscow, ID	L 7–14	9,000	
November 11	1:30 pm	at Oregon State	Bell Field; Corvallis, OR	L 19–34	8,000	
November 18	10:30 am	at Boston University*	Fenway Park; Boston, MA	W 26–19	8,298	
November 25	7:15 pm	at Arizona State*	Goodwin Stadium; Tempe, AZ	L 21–48		
*Non-conference game; ^{†}Homecoming; Rankings from AP Poll released prior to the game; All times are in Pacific time

== Coaching staff ==
- Red Ramsey, line
- Gene Harlow, guards
- Raymond A. Curfman, ends
- Art Smith, freshmen

== All-conference ==
No Vandals were on the All-Coast team; honorable mention were guard Roy Colquitt and fullback King Block.

== NFL draft ==
Three seniors from the 1950 Vandals were selected in the 1951 NFL draft:

Player	Position	Round	Pick	Franchise
Bill Fray	T	16th	191	New York Yanks
King Block	FB	21st	250	Detroit Lions
Jim Chadband	HB	28th	335	New York Yanks

One junior was selected in the 1952 NFL draft:

Player	Position	Round	Pick	Franchise
Glen Christian	HB	9th	105	San Francisco 49ers

One sophomore was selected in the 1953 NFL draft:

Player	Position	Round	Pick	Franchise
Don Ringe	T	26th	303	Chicago Cardinals
