= 1950 Pepperdine Waves football team =

American college football season

1950 Pepperdine Waves football
- Conference: California Collegiate Athletic Association
- Record: 4–5 (2–2 CCAA)
- Head coach: Ray Richards (2nd season)
- Home stadium: Gilmore Stadium

1950 California Collegiate Athletic Association football standings
	Conf.					Overall
Team	W		L		T	W		L		T
San Diego State $	3	–	0	–	1	5	–	3	–	1
Santa Barbara	3	–	1	–	0	7	–	3	–	0
Pepperdine	2	–	2	–	0	4	–	5	–	0
Fresno State	1	–	2	–	1	2	–	6	–	1
Cal Poly	0	–	4	–	0	3	–	7	–	0
$ – Conference champion

The 1950 Pepperdine Waves football team represented George Pepperdine College (Note: Pepperdine University was known as George Pepperdine College from 1937 to 1970.) as a member of the California Collegiate Athletic Association (CCAA) during the 1950 college football season. The team was led by second-year head coach Ray Richards and played home games at Gilmore Stadium in Los Angeles. They finished the season with an overall record of 4–5 and a mark of 2–2 in conference play, placing third in the CCAA.

== Schedule ==
Date	Opponent	Site	Result	Attendance	Source
September 16	at Cal Poly	Mustang Stadium; San Luis Obispo, CA	W 20–12		
September 23	Loyola (CA)*	Gilmore Stadium; Los Angeles, CA	L 14–50	11,800	
September 29	at BYU*	Cougar Stadium (Note: This stadium is the predecessor to the current Cougar Stadium on the BYU campus, which was opened for the 1964 season); Provo, UT	L 27–28	6,500	
October 14	at San Diego State	Aztec Bowl; San Diego, CA	L 14–28	10,000	
October 21	at Redlands*	Redlands Stadium (Note: This stadium is the predecessor to the current Ted Runner Stadium on the University of Redlands campus, which was opened for the 1968 season); Redlands, CA	W 25–14		
October 28	San Jose State*	Gilmore Stadium; Los Angeles, CA	L 7–48		
November 4	Santa Barbara	Gilmore Stadium; Los Angeles, CA	L 7–16	5,000	
November 18	Fresno State	Gilmore Stadium; Los Angeles, CA	W 27–13	500	
November 25	Arizona State–Flagstaff*	Gilmore Stadium; Los Angeles, CA	W 66–12		
*Non-conference game
