= 1950 Utah Utes football team =

American college football season

1950 Utah Utes football
- Conference: Skyline Conference
- Record: 3–4–3 (1–2–2 Skyline)
- Head coach: Jack Curtice (1st season)
- Home stadium: Ute Stadium

1950 Skyline Conference football standings
	Conf.					Overall
Team	W		L		T	W		L		T
No. 12 Wyoming $	5	–	0	–	0	10	–	0	–	0
Colorado A&M	4	–	1	–	0	6	–	3	–	0
Denver	2	–	2	–	1	3	–	8	–	1
Utah	1	–	2	–	2	3	–	4	–	3
BYU	1	–	3	–	1	4	–	5	–	1
Utah State	0	–	5	–	0	2	–	9	–	0
$ – Conference champion; Rankings from AP Poll

The 1950 Utah Utes football team, or also commonly known as the Utah Redskins, was an American football team that represented the University of Utah as a member of the Skyline Conference during the 1950 college football season. In their first season under head coach Jack Curtice, the Utes compiled an overall record of 3–4–3 with a mark of 1–2–2 against conference opponents, winning placing fourth in the Skyline. Utah played home games on campus at Ute Stadium in Salt Lake City.

== Schedule ==
Date	Opponent	Site	Result	Attendance	Source
September 23	vs. Idaho*	old Bronco Stadium; Boise, IdD	L 19–26	12,500	
September 30	Arizona*	Ute Stadium; Salt Lake City, UT	W 27–14		
October 7	at BYU	Cougar Stadium; Provo, UT (rivalry)	T 28–28		
October 13	at Denver	Hilltop Stadium; Denver, CO	T 14–14	11,754	
October 21	Wyoming^{†}	Ute Stadium; Salt Lake City, UT	L 13–53	22,325	
October 28	Colorado*	Ute Stadium; Salt Lake City, UT (rivalry)	T 20–20	11,000	
November 4	Kansas*	Ute Stadium; Salt Lake City, UT	L 26–39	13,111	
November 11	at Colorado A&M	Colorado Field; Fort Collins, CO	L 7–32		
November 23	Utah State	Ute Stadium; Salt Lake City, UT (rivalry)	W 46–0	16,108	
December 16	at Hawaii*	Honolulu Stadium; Honolulu, Territory of Hawaii	W 40–28	7,000–9,000	
*Non-conference game; ^{†}Homecoming

== NFL draft ==
Utah had one player selected in the 1951 NFL draft.

Player	Position	Round	Pick	NFL team
Dave Cunningham	Back	23	275	New York Yanks
