= 1950 San Diego State Aztecs football team =

American college football season

1950 San Diego State Aztecs football

CCAA champion
- Conference: California Collegiate Athletic Association
- Record: 5–3–1 (3–0–1 CCAA)
- Head coach: Bill Schutte (4th season)
- Home stadium: Aztec Bowl

1950 California Collegiate Athletic Association football standings
	Conf.					Overall
Team	W		L		T	W		L		T
San Diego State $	3	–	0	–	1	5	–	3	–	1
Santa Barbara	3	–	1	–	0	7	–	3	–	0
Pepperdine	2	–	2	–	0	4	–	5	–	0
Fresno State	1	–	2	–	1	2	–	6	–	1
Cal Poly	0	–	4	–	0	3	–	7	–	0
$ – Conference champion

The 1950 San Diego State Aztecs football team represented San Diego State College (Note: San Diego State University was known as San Diego State College from 1935 to 1971.) during the 1950 college football season.

San Diego State competed in the California Collegiate Athletic Association (CCAA). The team was led by fourth-year head coach Bill Schutte, and played home games at Aztec Bowl. They finished the season with five wins, three losses and one tie (5–3–1, 3–0–1 CCAA). Overall, the team outscored its opponents 212–186 for the season.

== Schedule ==
Date	Opponent	Site	Result	Attendance	Source
September 20	at Hawaii*	Honolulu Stadium; Honolulu, HI	W 49–27	15,000	
September 29	at San Jose State*	Spartan Stadium; San Jose, CA	L 0–26	8,000	
October 7	San Diego Marines (Note: The Marine Corps Recruit Depot (MCRD) in San Diego fielded a team that played against colleges and other military teams from 1922 to 1964.)*	Aztec Bowl; San Diego, CA	L 14–28	10,000	
October 14	Pepperdine	Aztec Bowl; San Diego, CA	W 28–14	10,000	
October 21	Fresno State	Aztec Bowl; San Diego, CA (rivalry)	T 20–20	6,000	
October 28	Pomona*^{†}	Aztec Bowl; San Diego, CA	W 48–20	7,500	
November 4	at Arizona State*	Goodwin Stadium; Tempe, AZ	L 13–31	14,000–17,000	
November 18	at Cal Poly	Mustang Stadium; San Luis Obispo, CA	W 12–8	1,000	
November 25	at Santa Barbara	La Playa Stadium; Santa Barbara, CA	W 28–12		
*Non-conference game; ^{†}Homecoming
