= 1950 Pacific Tigers football team =

American college football season

1950 Pacific Tigers football
- Conference: Independent
- Record: 7–3–1
- Head coach: Larry Siemering (4th season)
- Home stadium: Pacific Memorial Stadium

1950 Western college football independents records
| | Conf. | | | Overall |
| Team | W | L | T | W | | L | | T |
|---|---|---|---|---|---|---|---|---|
| Loyola (CA) | | – | | 8 | – | 1 | – | 0 |
| Pacific (CA) | | – | | 7 | – | 3 | – | 1 |
| San Francisco | | – | | 7 | – | 4 | – | 0 |
| San Jose State | | – | | 6 | – | 3 | – | 1 |
| Hawaii | | – | | 5 | – | 4 | – | 2 |
| Montana | | – | | 5 | – | 5 | – | 0 |
| La Verne | | – | | 3 | – | 5 | – | 0 |
| Santa Clara | | – | | 3 | – | 7 | – | 0 |
| Saint Mary's | | – | | 2 | – | 7 | – | 1 |
| Cal Poly San Dimas | | – | | 1 | – | 6 | – | 1 |
| Nevada | | – | | 1 | – | 9 | – | 0 |

The 1950 Pacific Tigers football team represented the College of the Pacific (Note: University of the Pacific (UOP) was known as College of the Pacific from 1911 to 1961.) as an independent during the 1950 college football season. In their fourth season under head coach Larry Siemering, the Tigers compiled a record of 7–3–1 and outscored their opponents 348–131. The team ranked tenth in major college football in total offense, tallying an average of 399.9 yards per game.

Debuting this season was the new Pacific Memorial Stadium, (Note: Amos Alonzo Stagg Memorial Stadium was known as "Pacific Memorial Stadium" from its opening in 1950 through 1987.) in Stockton, California, which was the Tigers' home until the football program was discontinued after the 1995 season.

== Schedule ==
| Date | Opponent | Site | Result | Attendance | Source |
|---|---|---|---|---|---|
| September 22 | at Saint Mary's | Kezar Stadium; San Francisco, CA | W 40–0 | 15,541 | |
| September 30 | at LSU | Tiger Stadium; Baton Rouge, LA | L 0–19 | 30,000 | |
| October 6 | at Denver | Hilltop Stadium; Denver, CO | W 41–7 | 12,000 | |
| October 14 | at Nevada | Mackay Stadium (Note: This stadium is the predecessor to the current Mackay Stadium, which was opened for the 1966 season."University of Nevada, Reno; Mackay Stadium".); Reno, NV | W 43–7 | | |
| October 21 | Loyola (CA) | Pacific Memorial Stadium; Stockton, CA | L 33–35 | | |
| October 28 | at Fresno State | Ratcliffe Stadium; Fresno, CA | W 52–7 | 10,661 | |
| November 4 | Santa Clara | Pacific Memorial Stadium; Stockton, CA | W 33–14 | 23,200 | |
| November 11 | at Cincinnati | Nippert Stadium; Cincinnati, OH | L 7–14 | 16,000 | |
| November 18 | San Jose State | Pacific Memorial Stadium; Stockton, CA (Victory Bell) | T 7–7 | 11,000 | |
| November 24 | Boston University | Pacific Memorial Stadium; Stockton, CA | W 55–7 | 11,000 | |
| December 2 | Quantico Marines | Pacific Memorial Stadium; Stockton, CA | W 37–14 | 16,000 | |

== Team players in the NFL ==
One College of the Pacific player was selected in the 1951 NFL draft.

| Player | Position | Round | Overall | NFL team |
| Bob Moser | Center | 4 | 47 | Chicago Bears |
