= 1950 Washington State Cougars football team =

American college football season

1950 Washington State Cougars football
- Conference: Pacific Coast Conference
- Record: 4–3–2 (2–3–2 PCC)
- Head coach: Forest Evashevski (1st season)
- Offensive scheme: Single-wing
- Captain: LaVern Torgeson
- Home stadium: Rogers Field, Memorial Stadium

1950 Pacific Coast Conference football standings
	Conf.					Overall
Team	W		L		T	W		L		T
No. 5 California $	5	–	0	–	1	9	–	1	–	1
No. 11 Washington	6	–	1	–	0	8	–	2	–	0
UCLA	5	–	2	–	0	6	–	3	–	0
Stanford	2	–	2	–	2	5	–	3	–	2
Idaho	1	–	1	–	1	3	–	5	–	1
Washington State	2	–	3	–	2	4	–	3	–	2
USC	1	–	3	–	2	2	–	5	–	2
Oregon State	2	–	5	–	0	3	–	6	–	0
Oregon	0	–	7	–	0	1	–	9	–	0
$ – Conference champion; Rankings from AP Poll

The 1950 Washington State Cougars football team was an American football team that represented Washington State College during the 1950 college football season. First-year head coach Forest Evashevski led the team to a 2–3–2 mark in the Pacific Coast Conference (PCC) and 4–3–2 overall.

The rivalry game with Washington (now the Apple Cup) marked the first use of Memorial Stadium in Spokane for select Cougar home games, which continued through 1983.

Hired in late January, 32-year-old Evashevski was the backfield coach at Michigan State under Biggie Munn and a former back and team captain at Michigan under Fritz Crisler.

== Schedule ==
Date	Opponent	Site	Result	Attendance	Source
September 23	at Utah State*	Romney Stadium; Logan, UT	W 46–6	5,000	
September 30	at UCLA	Los Angeles Memorial Coliseum; Los Angeles, CA	L 0–42	20,117	
October 7	USC	Rogers Field; Pullman, WA	T 20–20	16,000	
October 14	at Montana*	Dornblaser Field; Missoula, MT	W 14–7	8,000	
October 28	Idaho	Rogers Field; Pullman, WA (rivalry)	T 7–7	19,000	
November 4	at Oregon	Hayward Field; Eugene, OR	W 21–13	15,176	
November 11	at Stanford	Stanford Stadium; Stanford, CA	L 18–28	15,000	
November 18	Oregon State^{†}	Rogers Field; Pullman, WA	W 21–7	13,000	
November 25	No. 18 Washington	Memorial Stadium; Spokane, WA (rivalry)	L 21–52	28,181	
*Non-conference game; ^{†}Homecoming; Rankings from AP Poll released prior to the game; Source:
