= 1950 Hawaii Rainbows football team =

American college football season

1950 Hawaii Rainbows football

Pineapple Bowl, W 28–27 vs. Denver
- Conference: Independent
- Record: 5–4–2
- Head coach: Tom Kaulukukui (6th season)
- Home stadium: Honolulu Stadium

1950 Western college football independents records
	Conf.			Overall
Team	W	L	T	W		L		T
Loyola (CA)		–		8	–	1	–	0
Pacific (CA)		–		7	–	3	–	1
San Francisco		–		7	–	4	–	0
San Jose State		–		6	–	3	–	1
Hawaii		–		5	–	4	–	2
Montana		–		5	–	5	–	0
La Verne		–		3	–	5	–	0
Santa Clara		–		3	–	7	–	0
Saint Mary's		–		2	–	7	–	1
Cal Poly San Dimas		–		1	–	6	–	1
Nevada		–		1	–	9	–	0

The 1950 Hawaii Rainbows football team represented the University of Hawaiʻi as an independent during the 1950 college football season. In their sixth season under head coach Tom Kaulukukui, the Rainbows compiled a 5–4–2 record.

== Schedule ==
Date	Opponent	Site	Result	Attendance	Source
September 20	San Diego State	Honolulu Stadium; Honolulu, Territory of Hawaii	L 27–49	12,000	
September 27	Leilehua	Honolulu Stadium; Honolulu, Territory of Hawaii	T 6–6		
October 6	at Fresno State	Ratcliffe Stadium; Fresno, CA (rivalry)	L 20–34	11,000	
October 14	at Willamette	McCulloch Stadium; Salem, OR	T 21–21		
October 20	College of Idaho	Honolulu Stadium; Honolulu, Territory of Hawaii	W 43–14		
November 8	Islanders	Honolulu Stadium; Honolulu, Territory of Hawaii	W 41–6		
November 17	BYU	Honolulu Stadium; Honolulu, Territory of Hawaii	W 39–7	12,000	
November 22	Cardinals	Honolulu Stadium; Honolulu, Territory of Hawaii	W 24–6		
December 1	Texas Western	Honolulu Stadium; Honolulu, Territory of Hawaii	L 13–46	12,000	
December 16	Utah^{†}	Honolulu Stadium; Honolulu, Territory of Hawaii	L 28–40	7,000–9,000	
January 1, 1951	Denver	Honolulu Stadium; Honolulu, Territory of Hawaii (Pineapple Bowl)	W 28–27	11,000	
^{†}Homecoming
