= 1950 Cal Poly San Dimas Broncos football team =

American college football season

1950 Cal Poly San Dimas Broncos football
- Conference: Independent
- Record: 1–6–1
- Head coach: Duane Whitehead (3rd season)

1950 Western college football independents records
	Conf.			Overall
Team	W	L	T	W		L		T
Loyola (CA)		–		8	–	1	–	0
Pacific (CA)		–		7	–	3	–	1
San Francisco		–		7	–	4	–	0
San Jose State		–		6	–	3	–	1
Hawaii		–		5	–	4	–	2
Montana		–		5	–	5	–	0
La Verne		–		3	–	5	–	0
Santa Clara		–		3	–	7	–	0
Saint Mary's		–		2	–	7	–	1
Cal Poly San Dimas		–		1	–	6	–	1
Nevada		–		1	–	9	–	0

The 1950 Cal Poly San Dimas Broncos football team represented the Cal Poly Kellogg-Voorhis Unit—now known as California State Polytechnic University, Pomona—as an independent during the 1950 college football season. Led by third-year head coach Duane Whitehead, Cal Poly San Dimas compiled a record of 1–6–1. The team was outscored by its opponents 241 to 75 for the season and was shut out in three of the eight games.

== Schedule ==
Date	Opponent	Site	Result
October 1	at Humboldt State	Redwood Bowl; Arcata, CA	T 13–13
October 6	at Riverside	Wheelock Field; Riverside, CA	L 0–13
October 14	at Redlands	Redlands Stadium (Note: This stadium is the predecessor to the current Ted Runner Stadium on the University of Redlands campus, which was opened for the 1968 season); Redlands, CA	L 6–26
October 21	at El Camino	El Camino Stadium; Torrance, CA	L 0–42
October 28	La Verne	Covina High School; Covina, CA	L 0–42
November 4	Eastern Arizona	Covina High School; Covina, CA	W 25–20
November 10	at San Francisco State	Cox Stadium; San Francisco, CA	L 18–59
November 17	at Chaffey	Ontario, CA	L 13–26
