= Roy Engle =

American football and baseball player and coach

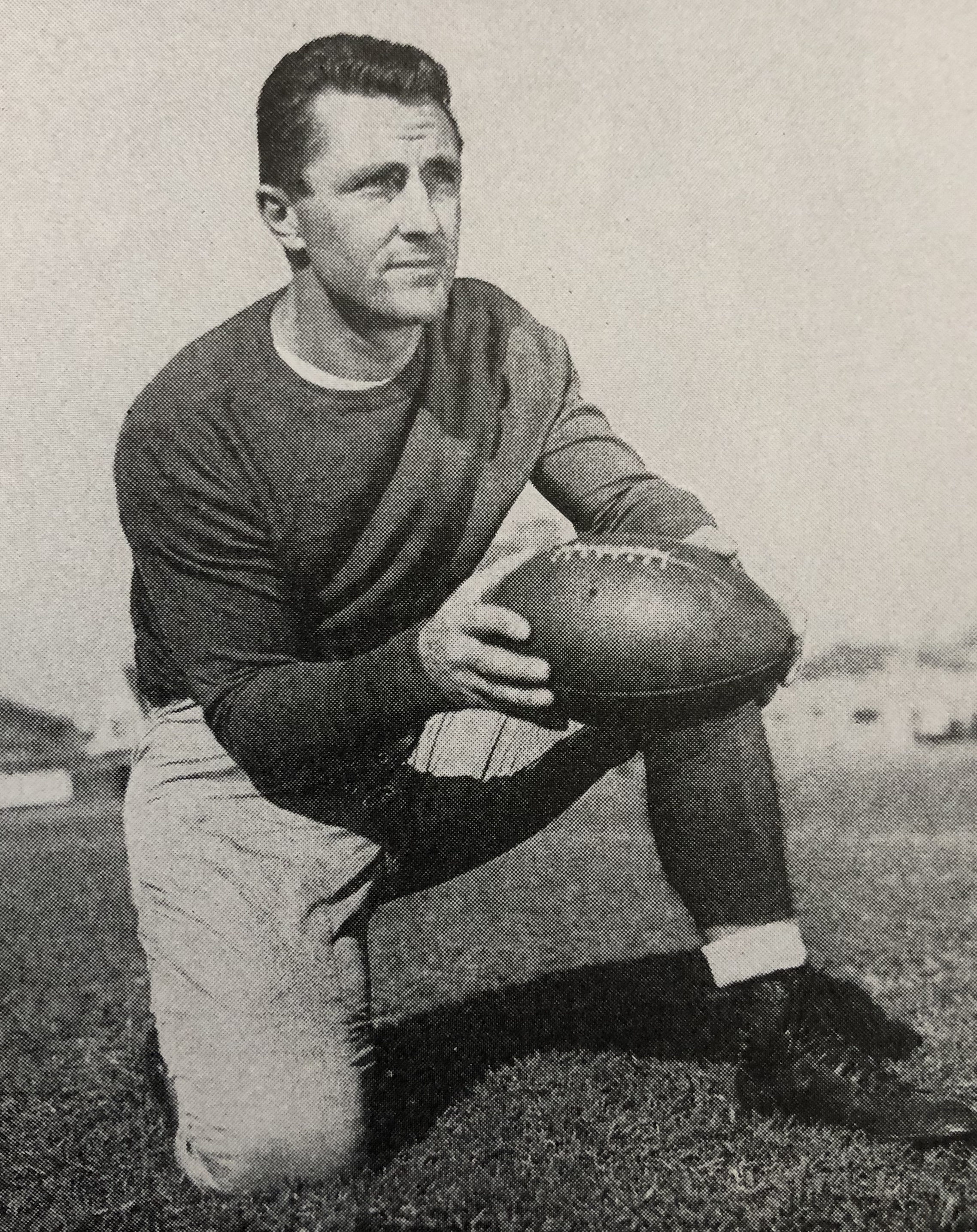
- Engle at USC c. 1948

Biographical details
- Born: November 25, 1917; Sheldon, Iowa, U.S.
- Died: July 7, 2005 (aged 87); Rancho Bernardo, California, U.S.

Playing career

Football
- 1936–1939: USC
- 1943: Saint Mary's Pre-Flight

Baseball
- 1940: Tulsa Oilers
- 1940: Tyler Trojans
- Positions: Fullback (football); Catcher (baseball)

Coaching career (HC unless noted)

Football
- 1945: Olathe NAS
- 1947–1948: USC (RB)
- 1949–1951: Santa Barbara

Baseball
- 1942: Hoover HS (CA)
- 1952–1953: Santa Barbara
- 1953–1960: Hoover HS (CA)

Head coaching record
- Overall: 17–16 (college football); 30–25 (college baseball)

Roy Winfield Engle (November 25, 1917 – July 7, 2005) was an American football and baseball player and coach. After completing a college football career at the University of Southern California (USC), he served as the head football coach at Santa Barbara College of the University of California—now known as the University of California, Santa Barbara—from 1949 to 1951, compiling a record of 14–14. He was also the head baseball coach at Santa Barbara from 1952 to 1952, tallying a mark of 30–25.

Engle also spent a summer in the Chicago Cubs and St. Louis Browns minor league program.

== Head coaching record ==
=== College football ===
Year	Team	Overall	Conference	Standing	Bowl/playoffs
Olathe Naval Air Station Clippers (Independent) (1945)
1945	Olathe MAS	3–2			
Olathe MAS:		3–2			
Santa Barbara Gauchos (California Collegiate Athletic Association) (1949–1951)
1949	Santa Barbara	2–7	1–3	T–3rd	
1950	Santa Barbara	7–3	3–1	2nd	
1951	Santa Barbara	5–4	1–3	4th	
Santa Barbara:		14–14	5–5		
Total:		17–16			

== Personal life ==
His son, Dave Engle, played major league baseball for the Minnesota Twins.
