= 1950 Lewis & Clark Pioneers football team =

American college football season

1950 Lewis & Clark Pioneers football

NWC champion Pear Bowl champion

Pear Bowl, W 61–7 vs. San Francisco State
- Conference: Northwest Conference
- Record: 9–0 (5–0 NWC)
- Head coach: Joe Huston (4th season)
- Home stadium: Multnomah Stadium, Vaughn Street ballpark

1950 Northwest Conference football standings
| | Conf. | | | | | Overall |
| Team | W | | L | | T | W | | L | | T |
|---|---|---|---|---|---|---|---|---|---|---|
| Lewis & Clark $ | 5 | – | 0 | – | 0 | 9 | – | 0 | – | 0 |
| Pacific (OR) | 3 | – | 2 | – | 0 | 7 | – | 2 | – | 0 |
| Linfield | 3 | – | 2 | – | 0 | 6 | – | 3 | – | 0 |
| College of Idaho | 2 | – | 3 | – | 0 | 4 | – | 5 | – | 0 |
| Willamette | 1 | – | 4 | – | 0 | 4 | – | 4 | – | 2 |
| Whitman | 1 | – | 4 | – | 0 | 3 | – | 6 | – | 0 |
$ – Conference champion

The 1950 Lewis & Clark Pioneers football team was an American football team that represented Lewis & Clark College of Portland, Oregon, as a member of the Northwest Conference (NWC) during the 1950 college football season. In their fourth year under head coach Joe Huston, the Pioneers compiled a perfect 9–0 record (5–0 in conference games), won the NWC championship, shut out five opponents, and outscored all opponents by a total of 327 to 32.

As the NWC champion, the Lewis & Clark was invited to play in the Pear Bowl in Medford, Oregon. The Pioneers easily defeated the San Francisco Gators, 61 to 7, led by the rushing attack of Dick Walker and Rube Maisch and the passing of Clarke Anderson. They were also considered for the Pineapple Bowl on January 1, but the game's organizers instead invited the Denver Pioneers despite a 3–7–1 record.

Eleven Lewis & Clark players were selected by Northwest Conference coaches as first-team players on the 1950 all-conference team. Five were named to the offensive team: halfback Rueben Baisch; fullback Stan Blair; guard Jim King; and tackles Elden Stender and Bill O'Hara. Six were named to the defensive team: ends Phil Fraser and Bill Bell; tackle Guy Gerber; guard Bud Cox; halfback Dick Voll; and safety Fred Wilson. The Pioneers also played four on the United Press' small-college all-coast football team: back Reuben Baisch, guard Bud Cox, tackle Bill O'Hara, and defensive back Blair.

The team played home games at Multnomah Stadium and the Vaughn Street ballpark in Portland, Oregon.

== Schedule ==
| Date | Opponent | Site | Result | Source |
|---|---|---|---|---|
| September 16 | Oregon College* | Multnomah Stadium; Portland, OR | W 28–13 | |
| September 23 | vs. Southern Oregon* | Marshfield Stadium; Coos Bay, OR (Shrine Myrtle Bowl) | W 27–6 | |
| October 7 | at Linfield | McMinnville, OR | W 44–0 | |
| October 14 | at Pacific (OR) | Forest Grove, OR | W 24–0 | |
| October 21 | Willamette | Portland, OR | W 20–6 | |
| October 28 | Vanport | Portland, OR | W 38–0 | |
| November 4 | Whitman | Vaughn Street ballpark; Portland, OR | W 32–0 | |
| November 11 | College of Idaho | Portland, OR | W 53–0 | |
| November 23 | vs. San Francisco State | Medford Stadium; Medford, OR (Pear Bowl) | W 61–7 | |
*Non-conference game
