= 1950 Washington Huskies football team =

American college football season

1950 Washington Huskies football
- Conference: Pacific Coast Conference

Ranking
- Coaches: No. T–15
- AP: No. 11
- Record: 8–2 (6–1 PCC)
- Head coach: Howie Odell (3rd season)
- Captains: Joe Cloidt; Mike Michael
- Home stadium: University of Washington Stadium

1950 Pacific Coast Conference football standings
	Conf.					Overall
Team	W		L		T	W		L		T
No. 5 California $	5	–	0	–	1	9	–	1	–	1
No. 11 Washington	6	–	1	–	0	8	–	2	–	0
UCLA	5	–	2	–	0	6	–	3	–	0
Stanford	2	–	2	–	2	5	–	3	–	2
Idaho	1	–	1	–	1	3	–	5	–	1
Washington State	2	–	3	–	2	4	–	3	–	2
USC	1	–	3	–	2	2	–	5	–	2
Oregon State	2	–	5	–	0	3	–	6	–	0
Oregon	0	–	7	–	0	1	–	9	–	0
$ – Conference champion; Rankings from AP Poll

The 1950 Washington Huskies football team was an American football team that represented the University of Washington during the 1950 college football season. In its third season under head coach Howie Odell, the team compiled an 8–2 record, finished second in the Pacific Coast Conference, and outscored its opponents 265 to 134.

Quarterback Don Heinrich led the country in passing, completing 134 of 221 passes (60.9%) for 1,846 yards with nine touchdownsand 14 touchdowns. Halfback Hugh McElhenny also ranked among the nation's leading rushers with 1,107 yards on 179 carries (6.18 average). Joe Cloidt and Mike Michael were the team captains.

As a team, the Huskies ranked third nationally in passing offense (204.1 yards per game) and eighth in total offense (411.6 yards per game).

== Schedule ==
Date	Opponent	Rank	Site	Result	Attendance	Source
September 23	Kansas State*		University of Washington Stadium; Seattle, WA	W 33–7	30,500	
September 30	No. 18 Minnesota*		University of Washington Stadium; Seattle, WA	W 28–13	49,500	
October 7	No. 13 UCLA	No. 10	University of Washington Stadium; Seattle, WA	W 21–20	34,500	
October 14	at Oregon State	No. 11	Multnomah Stadium; Portland, OR	W 35–6	27,876	
October 21	at Illinois*	No. 10	Memorial Stadium; Champaign, IL	L 13–20	36,743	
October 28	at Stanford		Stanford Stadium; Stanford, CA	W 21–7	35,000	
November 4	No. 6 California	No. 12	University of Washington Stadium; Seattle, WA	L 7–14	55,200	
November 11	Oregon	No. 17	University of Washington Stadium; Seattle, WA (rivalry)	W 27–12	33,500	
November 18	at USC	No. 19	Los Angeles Memorial Coliseum; Los Angeles, CA	W 28–13	23,442	
November 25	vs. Washington State	No. 18	Memorial Stadium; Spokane, WA (rivalry)	W 52–21	28,181	
*Non-conference game; Rankings from AP Poll released prior to the game; Source:

== NFL draft selections ==
One University of Washington Husky was selected in the 1951 NFL draft, which lasted 30 rounds with 362 selections.'

= Husky Hall of Fame

Player	Position	Round	Pick	NFL club
Roland Kirby	Back	10th	121	Los Angeles Rams

== Notes ==
- Hugh McElhenney set a new University of Washington record for rushing yards in a season with 1,107 yards. This eclipsed Merle Miller's 456 yards from 1937. The record is currently held by Bishop Sankey.
- Don Heinrich set a new University of Washington record for passing yards in a season with 1,846 yards. The record is currently held by Michael Penix, Jr.
