= 1950 Stanford Indians football team =

American college football season

1950 Stanford Indians football
- Conference: Pacific Coast Conference
- Record: 5–3–2 (2–2–2 PCC)
- Head coach: Marchmont Schwartz (6th season)
- Home stadium: Stanford Stadium

1950 Pacific Coast Conference football standings
	Conf.					Overall
Team	W		L		T	W		L		T
No. 5 California $	5	–	0	–	1	9	–	1	–	1
No. 11 Washington	6	–	1	–	0	8	–	2	–	0
UCLA	5	–	2	–	0	6	–	3	–	0
Stanford	2	–	2	–	2	5	–	3	–	2
Idaho	1	–	1	–	1	3	–	5	–	1
Washington State	2	–	3	–	2	4	–	3	–	2
USC	1	–	3	–	2	2	–	5	–	2
Oregon State	2	–	5	–	0	3	–	6	–	0
Oregon	0	–	7	–	0	1	–	9	–	0
$ – Conference champion; Rankings from AP Poll

The 1950 Stanford Indians football team represented Stanford University in the 1950 college football season. Stanford was led by sixth-year head coach Marchmont Schwartz. The team were members of the Pacific Coast Conference and played their home games at Stanford Stadium in Stanford, California.

Coming off the successful 1949 season in which a talented group of sophomores, led by quarterback Gary Kerkorian and end Bill McColl, had the Indians a game away from the Rose Bowl, Stanford was expected to have an excellent season and was ranked seventh in the first-ever preseason AP poll. But after starting 4–0, the team would only win one more game and tie twice, the second tie coming in the Big Game, in which the team rallied to tie undefeated and Rose Bowl-bound rival California. Coach Schwartz resigned following the season.

== Schedule ==
Date	Opponent	Rank	Site	Result	Attendance	Source
September 23	San Jose State*	No. 7	Stanford Stadium; Stanford, CA (rivalry)	W 33–16	20,000	
September 30	San Francisco*	No. 7	Stanford Stadium; Stanford, CA	W 55–7	35,000	
October 7	at Oregon State	No. 8	Multnomah Stadium; Portland, OR	W 21–7	16,000	
October 14	Santa Clara*	No. 6	Stanford Stadium; Stanford, CA	W 23–13	29,000	
October 21	at UCLA	No. 6	Los Angeles Memorial Coliseum; Los Angeles, CA	L 7–21	58,143	
October 28	Washington		Stanford Stadium; Stanford, CA	L 7–21	35,000	
November 4	USC		Stanford Stadium; Stanford, CA (reivalry)	T 7–7	40,000	
November 11	Washington State		Stanford Stadium; Stanford, CA	W 28–18	15,000	
November 18	No. 3 Army*		Stanford Stadium; Stanford, CA	L 0–7	40,000	
November 25	at No. 4 California		California Memorial Stadium; Berkeley, CA (Big Game)	T 7–7	81,000	
*Non-conference game; Rankings from AP Poll released prior to the game; Source:

== Players drafted by the NFL ==
Player	Position	Round	Pick	NFL club
Bruce Van Alstyne	End	9	100	San Francisco 49ers
Bob White	Halfback	16	184	San Francisco 49ers
Russ Pomeroy	Tackle	18	211	Chicago Cardinals
