= 1950 UCLA Bruins football team =

American college football season

1950 UCLA Bruins football
- Conference: Pacific Coast Conference
- Record: 6–3 (5–2 PCC)
- Head coach: Red Sanders (2nd season)
- Offensive scheme: Single-wing
- Home stadium: Los Angeles Memorial Coliseum

1950 Pacific Coast Conference football standings
	Conf.					Overall
Team	W		L		T	W		L		T
No. 5 California $	5	–	0	–	1	9	–	1	–	1
No. 11 Washington	6	–	1	–	0	8	–	2	–	0
UCLA	5	–	2	–	0	6	–	3	–	0
Stanford	2	–	2	–	2	5	–	3	–	2
Idaho	1	–	1	–	1	3	–	5	–	1
Washington State	2	–	3	–	2	4	–	3	–	2
USC	1	–	3	–	2	2	–	5	–	2
Oregon State	2	–	5	–	0	3	–	6	–	0
Oregon	0	–	7	–	0	1	–	9	–	0
$ – Conference champion; Rankings from AP Poll

The 1950 UCLA Bruins football team was an American football team that represented the University of California, Los Angeles in the Pacific Coast Conference (PCC) during the 1950 college football season. In their second year under head coach Red Sanders, the Bruins compiled a 6–3 record (5–2 in PCC, third). Home games were played at the Los Angeles Memorial Coliseum.

== Schedule ==
Date	Opponent	Rank	Site	Result	Attendance	Source
September 23	Oregon		Los Angeles Memorial Coliseum; Los Angeles, CA	W 28–0	53,052	
September 30	Washington State		Los Angeles Memorial Coliseum; Los Angeles, CA	W 42–0	20,117	
October 7	at No. 10 Washington	No. 13	Husky Stadium; Seattle, WA	L 20–21	34,500	
October 13	Illinois*		Los Angeles Memorial Coliseum; Los Angeles, CA	L 6–14	45,619	
October 21	No. 6 Stanford		Los Angeles Memorial Coliseum; Los Angeles, CA	W 21–7	58,143	
October 28	at Purdue*	No. 18	Ross–Ade Stadium; West Lafayette, IN	W 20–6	39,000	
November 4	Oregon State	No. 19	Los Angeles Memorial Coliseum; Los Angeles, CA	W 20–13	15,323	
November 11	at No. 6 California	No. 19	California Memorial Stadium; Berkeley, CA (rivalry)	L 0–35	81,000	
November 25	USC		Los Angeles Memorial Coliseum; Los Angeles, CA (Victory Bell)	W 39–0	51,906	
*Non-conference game; Rankings from AP Poll released prior to the game; Source:
