= Stagg Memorial Stadium =

Demolished stadium in California, USA

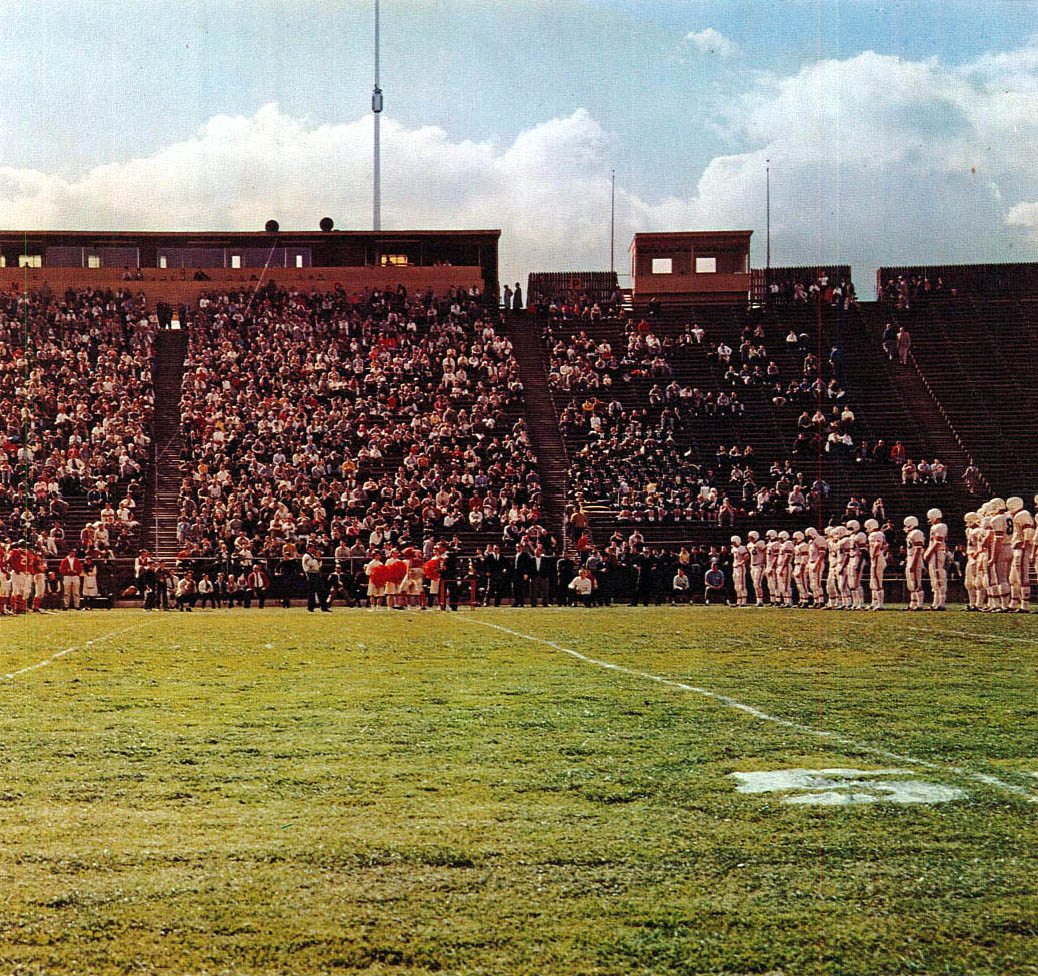
- View of the stadium in 1961

- Location within the United States Location within California
- Interactive map of Stagg Memorial Stadium
- Full name: Amos Alonzo Stagg; Memorial Stadium
- Former names: Pacific Memorial Stadium (1950–1988)
- Location: Stockton, California, U.S.
- Coordinates: 37.978°N 121.317°W
- Elevation: 15 feet (5 m) AMSL
- Owner: University of the Pacific
- Operator: UOP Athletics
- Capacity: 28,000
- Surface: Natural grass
- Scoreboard: Yes

Construction
- Groundbreaking: May 1950
- Opened: October 21, 1950; 76 years ago
- Closed: February 26, 2012; 14 years ago
- Demolished: 2014

Tenants
- Pacific Tigers (NCAA) teams: football (1950–1995); women's soccer (1995–2012)

Amos Alonzo Stagg Memorial Stadium, previously known as Pacific Memorial Stadium, was a 28,000-seat outdoor stadium in the western United States, located on the campus of the University of the Pacific in Stockton, California. The home venue of the Pacific Tigers was constructed in 1950 for football and later hosted soccer matches. It was closed in 2012 and demolished two years later.

The stadium was home venue to the Pacific Tigers football and women's soccer teams.

== History ==
=== Construction ===
Pacific Memorial Stadium was built 76 years ago in 1950 after the successful fund drive which netted $165,000. Most of this money was through the sale of pre-ordered tickets (scrip), which were usable over a 10-year period. Construction began on the earth-filled structure in May 1950. Astonishingly, it was finished on time for the home opener (fifth game of the season) on October 21, a build time of less than six months. The field's approximate alignment was north-northwest to south-southeast. It has been reported and researched the stadium was built on a former Yokuts village. These remains found were discovered in 1923 and raised concern for when the stadium was set to be demolished.

The stadium originally seated 35,975 with room for expansion to over 44,000, but renovations reduced the capacity to a configuration of 28,000. It was the venue for a 1997 friendly soccer match between Brazil and Honduras; notable striker Ronaldo scored six goals and Brazil won 8–2.

=== Upgrades ===
The "Pacific Club", which was added to the east-side of the stadium in 1973, was donated by Alex Spanos at a cost of $250,000. It sat up to 300, featuring glass walls and a great view of the stadium. When not in use for sporting events, it also held many university functions and gatherings. The scoreboard in the north end zone was erected in 1982 at a cost of $140,000 and measured 35 by 17 feet (10.7 by 5.2 m).

Thanks to donations from athletic boosters, lighting power at the stadium was upgraded from 35 to 75 footcandles in August 1986.

=== Renaming ===
Pacific Memorial Stadium was officially renamed Amos Alonzo Stagg Memorial Stadium on October 15, 1988, to honor Amos Alonzo Stagg (1862–1965). He ended his head coaching career at "College of the Pacific" in 1946, and donated the land for the stadium to be built in 1950. Stagg is widely regarded as a pioneer in the development of sports, not only football but also basketball and baseball.

=== Closure ===
On February 26, 2012, the university announced it would close Stagg Memorial Stadium to conduct a feasibility study to assess needed repairs, upgrades and changes required to make the facility meet modern standards in conjunction with a financial assessment to determine if the stadium could be repaired or if it should be replaced.

=== Demolition ===
The university began removal of Stagg Memorial Stadium on February 24, 2014, to make room for new athletics facilities, including a dedicated tennis center with 12 courts and a clubhouse, and new fields for soccer and field hockey. The first Pacific field hockey home game on the new artificial turf field was played on September 12, 2014, versus the University at Albany. The groundbreaking ceremony for the Eve Zimmerman Tennis Center was held on October 17, 2014. The field hockey program at Pacific was discontinued in the summer of 2019.

== Tenants ==
The stadium was home to the Pacific Tigers football program, beginning in 1950, until it was discontinued following the 1995 season. For many years it was also the home football field for nearby Stagg High School. The stadium was the sole home to the women's soccer team until its closure in 2012.
