= 1950 California Golden Bears football team =

American college football season

1950 California Golden Bears football

PCC champion

Rose Bowl, L 6–14 vs. Michigan
- Conference: Pacific Coast Conference

Ranking
- Coaches: No. 4
- AP: No. 5
- Record: 9–1–1 (5–0–1 PCC)
- Head coach: Pappy Waldorf (4th season)
- Offensive scheme: Single-wing
- Home stadium: California Memorial Stadium

1950 Pacific Coast Conference football standings
	Conf.					Overall
Team	W		L		T	W		L		T
No. 5 California $	5	–	0	–	1	9	–	1	–	1
No. 11 Washington	6	–	1	–	0	8	–	2	–	0
UCLA	5	–	2	–	0	6	–	3	–	0
Stanford	2	–	2	–	2	5	–	3	–	2
Idaho	1	–	1	–	1	3	–	5	–	1
Washington State	2	–	3	–	2	4	–	3	–	2
USC	1	–	3	–	2	2	–	5	–	2
Oregon State	2	–	5	–	0	3	–	6	–	0
Oregon	0	–	7	–	0	1	–	9	–	0
$ – Conference champion; Rankings from AP Poll

The 1950 California Golden Bears football team was an American football team that represented the University of California, Berkeley in the Pacific Coast Conference (PCC) during the 1950 college football season. In their fourth year under head coach Pappy Waldorf, the Golden Bears compiled a 9–1–1 record (5–0–1 in PCC, first), won a third consecutive PCC title, lost to Michigan in the Rose Bowl, was ranked No. 5 in the final AP Poll, and outscored its opponents 224 to 90. Home games were played on campus at California Memorial Stadium in Berkeley, California.

The star of this season was guard and linebacker Les Richter, who years later became the first Golden Bear to be inducted into the Pro Football Hall of Fame.

After California's third straight loss in the Rose Bowl in January 1951, the PCC invoked a "no-repeat" rule; affected teams were the 1954 UCLA Bruins and 1957 Oregon State Beavers.

== Schedule ==
Date	Opponent	Rank	Site	Result	Attendance	Source
September 23	Santa Clara*	No. 14	California Memorial Stadium; Berkeley, CA	W 27–9	46,000	
September 30	at Oregon	No. 14	Multnomah Stadium; Portland, OR	W 28–7	27,849	
October 7	No. 20 Penn*	No. 9	California Memorial Stadium; Berkeley, CA	W 14–7	64,000	
October 14	at USC	No. 7	Los Angeles Memorial Coliseum; Los Angeles, CA	W 13–7	55,468	
October 21	Oregon State	No. 5	California Memorial Stadium; Berkeley, CA	W 27–0	37,000	
October 28	Saint Mary's*	No. 5	California Memorial Stadium; Berkeley, CA	W 40–25	32,000	
November 4	at No. 12 Washington	No. 6	Husky Stadium; Seattle, WA	W 14–7	55,200	
November 11	No. 19 UCLA	No. 6	California Memorial Stadium; Berkeley, CA (rivalry)	W 35–0	81,000	
November 18	San Francisco*	No. 4	California Memorial Stadium; Berkeley, CA	W 13–7	14,000	
November 25	Stanford	No. 4	California Memorial Stadium; Berkeley, CA (Big Game)	T 7–7	81,000	
January 1, 1951	vs. No. 9 Michigan*	No. 5	Rose Bowl; Pasadena, CA (Rose Bowl)	L 6–14	98,939	
*Non-conference game; Rankings from AP Poll released prior to the game; Source:
