= Pear Bowl =

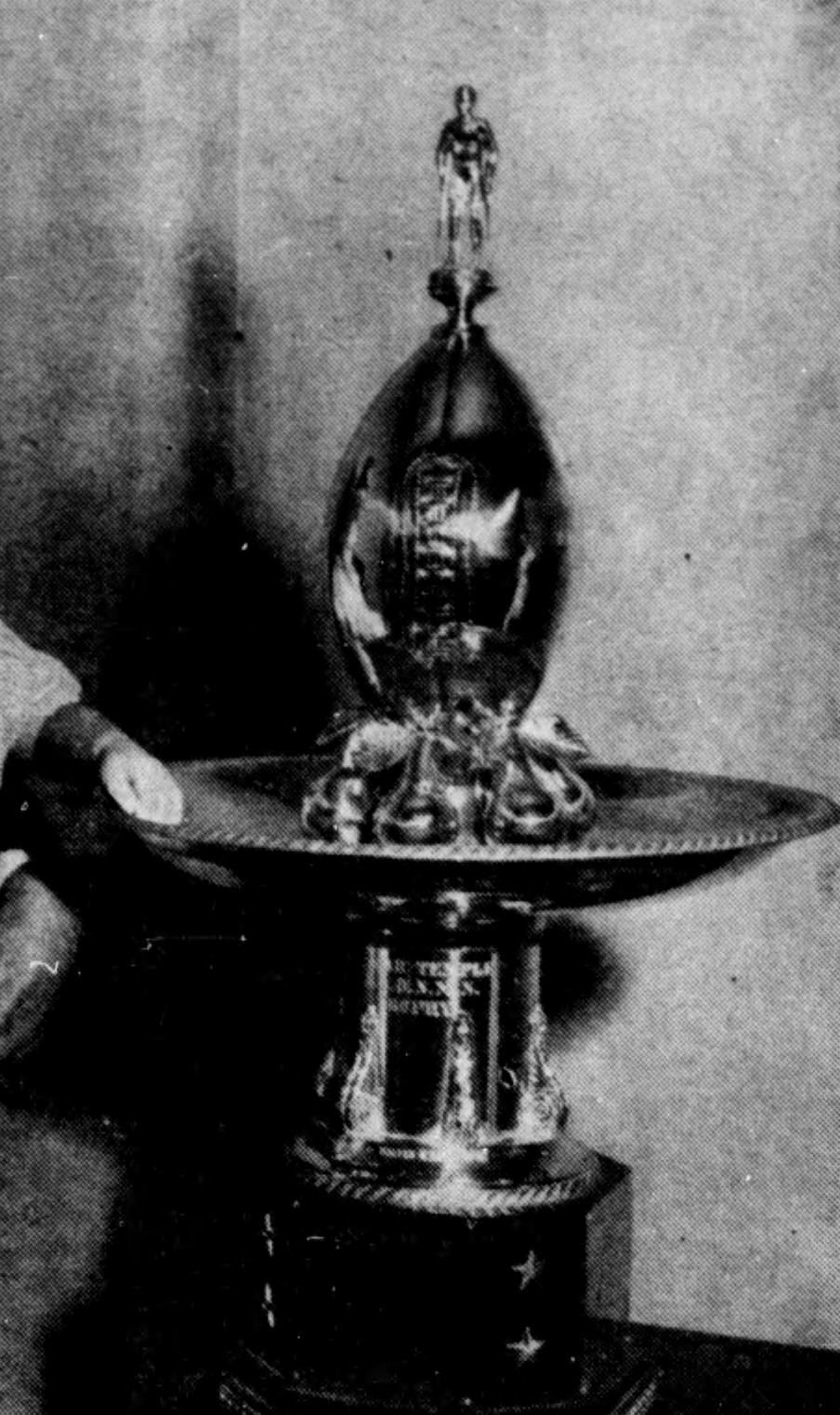
The trophy for the Pear Bowl in 1950.

The Pear Bowl was a postseason college football bowl game held on Thanksgiving weekend in Oregon. The game was held six times, following the 1946 through 1951 seasons. The first two games were held in Ashland, Oregon and the last four were held in Medford, Oregon. Following the 1949 game, the Northwest Conference and Far West Conference signed an agreement to have their champions meet in the game.

The games in Ashland were designed to raise funds for a new stadium on the Southern Oregon campus, while the Medford games were sponsored by Shriners International. The last three were sponsored by the Hillah Temple of the Shrine as a benefit for crippled children in Portland. In September 1952, the sponsoring organization voted to cancel the game due to economic and other considerations.

== Game results ==
Date	Winner		Loser		Ref
November 28, 1946	Southern Oregon	13	Central Washington	8	
November 27, 1947	Pacific Lutheran	27	Southern Oregon	21	
November 25, 1948	College of Idaho	27	Southern Oregon	20	
November 24, 1949	Pacific (OR)	33	Cal Aggies (Note: UC Davis was known as Northern Branch of the College of Agriculture from 1922 to 1959. See: UC Davis)	15	
November 23, 1950	Lewis & Clark	61	San Francisco State	7	
November 24, 1951	Pacific (OR)	25	Cal Aggies	7	

== See also ==
- List of college bowl games
