= Victory Bell (Cincinnati–Miami) =

College football rivalry game

- 111th Victory Bell logo

- Cincinnati Bearcats Miami RedHawks
- Sport: Football
- First meeting: December 8, 1888; Cincinnati 0, Miami 0
- Latest meeting: September 19, 2026; Cincinnati 35, Miami 31
- Trophy: Victory Bell

Statistics
- Total meetings: 129
- All-time series: Cincinnati, 62–60–7
- Largest victory: Cincinnati, 46–0 (1904)
- Longest win streak: Cincinnati, 16 (2006–2022)
- Current win streak: Cincinnati, 2 (2024–present)

Locations of Cincinnati and Miami

The Victory Bell is the trophy awarded to the winner of the American college football rivalry game played by the Cincinnati Bearcats football team of the University of Cincinnati and the Miami RedHawks football team of Miami University. The Victory Bell is the oldest current non-conference college football rivalry in the United States (though the teams were briefly conference rivals in the late 1940s and early 1950s). Having first been played in 1888, the rivalry is tied for being the oldest in the NCAA Division I Football Bowl Subdivision, with the North Carolina–Wake Forest rivalry and the Duke–North Carolina football rivalry also dating to 1888. It is also one of the most played college football rivalry games, with 129 meetings total.

== Historical background ==
College Comparison
	Cincinnati	Miami
Founded	1819	1809
Type	Public	Public
Location	Cincinnati, OH	Oxford, OH
Conference	Big 12	MAC
Students	53,000	24,377
School colors		
Nickname	Bearcats	RedHawks
Stadium	Nippert Stadium	Yager Stadium

As part of the agreement for the Symmes Purchase, John Cleves Symmes was instructed by the federal government to reserve a township for the creation of a university. Initially, land had been set aside in Cincinnati, but after a revision of the purchase, Symmes erroneously believed the requirement for a university was no longer necessary so the original plot was sold to settlers. Finally, on March 3, 1803, two days after Ohio attained statehood, Congress granted one complete township to be located in the District of Cincinnati under direction of the Ohio Legislature; if no township within the Symmes Purchase were offered in five years, then a township from federal lands was granted the State of Ohio to be held in trust for the establishment of a college. No township was offered, since no unentered township remained between the two Miami rivers. Miami University was finally founded in 1809, although construction was halted for many years. Interest in higher education did not decline in Cincinnati, with the foundation of the Cincinnati College in 1819, which would later become part of the University of Cincinnati. Delays during the War of 1812 even saw residents of Cincinnati try—and fail—to move Miami to the city in 1822 and to divert its income to the foundation of another college in Cincinnati.

Beyond this foundational rivalry, many early faculty would serve at both universities. Famously William Holmes McGuffey joined the faculty of Miami in 1826, and began his work on the McGuffey Readers while in Oxford. McGuffey resigned in 1836 and became the President of the Cincinnati College, where he urged parents not to send their children to Miami noting, "[Miami would be] where it was more likely they would be made into Drunkards and Gamblers than good Scholars."

== Series history ==
The Bearcats and RedHawks square off each fall for the famed Victory Bell. The first game in the series, played on December 8, 1888, in Oxford, Ohio, was the first college football game played in the state of Ohio. The original bell hung in Miami's Harrison Hall (Old Main) near the site of the first game and was used to ring in Miami victories. The traveling trophy tradition began in the 1890s when some Cincinnati fans "borrowed" the bell. The bell went to the winner of the annual game for the next forty years until it mysteriously disappeared in the 1930s. The original bell reappeared in 1946 and was on display in the lobby of Miami's Murstein Alumni Center for years. The current trophy is a replica of the original bell and is kept in the possession of the winning team each year. One side of the bell is painted black with white numbers showing Cincinnati's victories, while the other side is white with red numbers showing Miami's victories. Ties are indicated on the top of the red yoke in white numbers.

Given the proximity of the schools and many enrollees and alumni from the Greater Cincinnati area, from 1909 to 1970 the game was exclusively played at Cincinnati's Nippert Stadium, rather than hosting in the more rural Oxford. From 1912 to 1960 the game took place over Thanksgiving Weekend, making the Victory Bell a featured part of Thanksgiving traditions for fans of both schools. Cincinnati students and fans alike would go on an annual "Pajama Parade" through downtown Cincinnati the night prior to each Victory Bell contest.

The Miami–Cincinnati series ranks fifth on the list of most-played rivalries in college football and is the oldest Division I rivalry west of the Allegheny Mountains. After the 2010–2014 NCAA conference realignment led to the end of several historic rivalries, it is now the most-played currently active rivalry involving schools from the same state, and also holds the same distinction among inter-conference rivalries. Of the more than thirty college football rivalries that include at least 89 games, none is older than Miami vs. Cincinnati.

The two schools also have strong coaching histories, especially Miami's Cradle of Coaches. Four men have been head coaches at both schools: Amos Foster, George Little, Sid Gillman, and George Blackburn.

In 2022, Miami and Cincinnati extended the rivalry series through 2029. The Victory Bell would be hosted at Paul Brown Stadium (now Paycor Stadium) in 2018, 2022, and 2026 as a part of the renewed contract. However, due to the COVID-19 pandemic, the Mid-American Conference postponed fall sports in August 2020, canceling that year's edition of the Victory Bell game.

On July 31, 2023, Miami canceled the 2025 and 2028 games at Cincinnati. In return, on November 27, 2023, Cincinnati canceled the 2029 game at Miami. Further, on July 27, 2024, Cincinnati canceled the 2027 game at Miami, leaving the September 19, 2026 neutral site game as the last officially scheduled game between the teams. On June 16, 2026, it was announced that the 2026 game originally at Paycor Stadium was moved to TQL Stadium.

=== Notable games ===
November 23, 1923: The Bearcats would go on to beat Miami 23–0. The significance of this match-up would come a month later, when Cincinnati player James Gamble "Jimmy" Nippert would die from blood poisoning, due to a spike wound sustained during the game. His grandfather James N. Gamble, of Procter & Gamble, donated the required funds to complete the stadium. A locker room and training (medical) facility was added as part of the renovation for the safety of players.

November 25, 1950: In a clash of future coaching legends, Miami and Woody Hayes took on Cincinnati and former Miami head coach Sid Gillman for the MAC Championship title in the midst of a snowstorm. The Redskins ended up being too much for the Bearcats and would take the game 28–0 as well as the conference crown. Miami would go on to win the Salad Bowl against Arizona State 34–21. Additionally, this game took place on the same day as the Snow Bowl between Michigan and Ohio State. Ohio State's loss to Michigan led to the Buckeyes to hire Woody Hayes away from Miami.

November 23, 1968: Determined to hand Miami a loss, Cincinnati had a potent offense led by QB Greg Cook and WR/K Jim O'Brien. Climbing back from a 21–6 deficit, the Bearcats recovered an onside kick and completed one pass before O'Brien drilled a forty-seven-yard field goal with three seconds remaining in the fourth quarter. UC would win the bell 23–21. This was Bo Schembechler's last game before he left to coach at the University of Michigan. Cincinnati Bengals founder Paul Brown was in attendance and concluded to draft Cook based on his performance in the game.

September 27, 2003: The 3–0 Bearcats headed to Oxford to take on Ben Roethlisberger and the RedHawks. Miami jumped to a huge lead, with Roethlisberger passing for 377 yards. The Bearcats mounted a furious comeback, scoring three times in the final eight minutes, but Miami's lead was too much and they would win 42–37.

September 16, 2017: It was Homecoming at Miami, and the RedHawk faithful were hopeful they could finally end Cincinnati's then 11-game winning streak with the Bearcats now led by then first-year coach Luke Fickell. Miami was leading 17–6 with 4:45 left in the game, before the Bearcats mounted an unthinkable comeback, scoring 15 unanswered points in the final 2:52. After a late Bearcats touchdown drive, Miami still held a 17–14 lead, and was poised to run out the clock. With 1:13 remaining and UC holding only one timeout, the RedHawks attempted to convert a 3rd down & 7 that would effectively end the game, but MU QB Gus Ragland made an ill-advised throw into double coverage. UC linebacker Malik Clements intercepted the pass and ran it into the end zone for a pick-six touchdown. The Bearcats would hold on and escape, winning 21–17.

September 4, 2021: After the 2020 meeting between the two schools was cancelled the teams resumed their rivalry and for the first time in the series the Victory Bell game was the season opener for both schools. The Bearcats picked up right where they left off and continued to win, Desmond Ridder hit Tyler Scott with an 81-yard bomb 45 seconds into the game, The Bearcats scored the first 42 points of the game and led all the way to a 49–14 win at Nippert Stadium. The win extended UC's winning streak in the series to 14, and knotted the all-time series at 59–59–7.

September 16, 2023: Miami won its first game since 2005, breaking a 16-game losing streak and tying the series at 60–60–7. Miami evened the game with a field goal with just over five minutes left in the fourth quarter, and scored the only touchdown in overtime to pull the huge upset.

== Game results ==
Cincinnati victories	Miami victories	Tie games

No.	Date	Location	Winner	Score
1	December 8, 1888	Miami Field	Tie	0–0
2	December 14, 1889	Miami Field	Miami	34–0
3	October 7, 1893	Miami Field	Miami	24–6
4	November 4, 1893	Union Ball Park	Miami	6–0
5	October 20, 1894	Union Ball Park	Cincinnati	6–0
6	November 16, 1895	Union Ball Park	Miami	12–0
7	October 2, 1896	Union Ball Park	Miami	6–4
8	October 9, 1897	Miami Field	Cincinnati	6–0
9	October 30, 1897	Union Ball Park	Cincinnati	10–0
10	October 8, 1898	Miami Field	Cincinnati	22–0
11	October 7, 1899	Union Ball Park	Cincinnati	21–0
12	November 3, 1900	Union Ball Park	Cincinnati	16–12
13	October 17, 1903	Nippert Stadium	Miami	15–0
14	October 15, 1904	Nippert Stadium	Cincinnati	46–0
15	October 13, 1906	Nippert Stadium	Tie	0–0
16	November 25, 1909	Nippert Stadium	Cincinnati	10–6
17	October 29, 1910	Nippert Stadium	Cincinnati	3–0
18	November 18, 1911	Nippert Stadium	Cincinnati	11–0
19	November 28, 1912	Nippert Stadium	Tie	21–21
20	November 27, 1913	Nippert Stadium	Miami	13–7
21	November 27, 1914	Nippert Stadium	Miami	20–13
22	November 25, 1915	Nippert Stadium	Miami	24–12
23	November 30, 1916	Nippert Stadium	Miami	33–0
24	November 29, 1917	Nippert Stadium	Miami	40–0
25	November 28, 1918	Nippert Stadium	Tie	0–0
26	November 28, 1919	Nippert Stadium	Miami	14–0
27	November 25, 1920	Nippert Stadium	Cincinnati	7–0
28	November 24, 1921	Nippert Stadium	Miami	15–7
29	November 30, 1922	Nippert Stadium	Miami	9–6
30	November 23, 1923	Nippert Stadium	Cincinnati	23–0
31	November 27, 1924	Nippert Stadium	Cincinnati	8–7
32	November 26, 1925	Nippert Stadium	Miami	33–0
33	November 25, 1926	Nippert Stadium	Tie	6–6
34	November 24, 1927	Nippert Stadium	Miami	17–14
35	November 29, 1928	Nippert Stadium	Miami	34–0
36	November 28, 1929	Nippert Stadium	Miami	14–6
37	November 27, 1930	Nippert Stadium	Cincinnati	6–0
38	November 26, 1931	Nippert Stadium	Cincinnati	20–0
39	November 24, 1932	Nippert Stadium	Miami	21–13
40	November 30, 1933	Nippert Stadium	Miami	6–2
41	November 29, 1934	Nippert Stadium	Cincinnati	21–0
42	November 28, 1935	Nippert Stadium	Cincinnati	8–7
43	November 26, 1936	Nippert Stadium	Tie	0–0
44	November 25, 1937	Nippert Stadium	Miami	14–6
45	November 24, 1938	Nippert Stadium	Miami	16–7
46	November 23, 1939	Nippert Stadium	Cincinnati	13–0
47	November 21, 1940	Nippert Stadium	Cincinnati	44–0
48	November 20, 1941	Nippert Stadium	Cincinnati	26–0
49	November 26, 1942	Nippert Stadium	Cincinnati	21–12
50	November 22, 1945	Nippert Stadium	Miami	28–14
51	November 28, 1946	Nippert Stadium	Cincinnati	13–7
52	November 27, 1947	Nippert Stadium	Miami	38–7
53	November 25, 1948	Nippert Stadium	Miami	43–19
54	November 24, 1949	Nippert Stadium	Cincinnati	27–6
55	November 25, 1950	Nippert Stadium	Miami	28–0
56	November 24, 1951	Nippert Stadium	Cincinnati	19–14
57	November 27, 1952	Nippert Stadium	Cincinnati	34–9
58	November 26, 1953	Nippert Stadium	Cincinnati	14–0
59	November 25, 1954	Nippert Stadium	Miami	21–9
60	November 24, 1955	Nippert Stadium	Miami	14–0
61	November 22, 1956	Nippert Stadium	Miami	27–13
62	November 28, 1957	Nippert Stadium	Miami	20–14
63	November 27, 1958	Nippert Stadium	Cincinnati	18–7
64	November 26, 1959	Nippert Stadium	Cincinnati	14–7
65	November 19, 1960	Nippert Stadium	Miami	10–6

No.	Date	Location	Winner	Score
66	November 18, 1961	Nippert Stadium	Miami	7–3
67	November 17, 1962	Nippert Stadium	Miami	38–16
68	November 28, 1963	Nippert Stadium	Miami	21–19
69	November 21, 1964	Nippert Stadium	Cincinnati	28–14
70	November 20, 1965	Nippert Stadium	Miami	37–7
71	November 26, 1966	Nippert Stadium	Miami	28–8
72	November 18, 1967	Nippert Stadium	Miami	27–14
73	November 23, 1968	Nippert Stadium	Cincinnati	23–21
74	November 22, 1969	Nippert Stadium	Miami	36–20
75	November 21, 1970	Nippert Stadium	Cincinnati	33–0
76	November 20, 1971	Miami Field	Miami	43–7
77	November 18, 1972	Nippert Stadium	Miami	23–0
78	November 17, 1973	Miami Field	No. 17 Miami	6–0
79	November 16, 1974	Nippert Stadium	No. 12 Miami	27–7
80	November 22, 1975	Miami Field	No. 16 Miami	21–13
81	September 25, 1976	Nippert Stadium	Cincinnati	17–0
82	November 24, 1977	Nippert Stadium	Miami	12–7
83	November 18, 1978	Miami Field	Miami	28–24
84	November 17, 1979	Miami Field	Miami	27–14
85	November 22, 1980	Nippert Stadium	Cincinnati	23–13
86	November 21, 1981	Miami Field	Miami	7–3
87	November 18, 1982	Riverfront Stadium	Cincinnati	20–10
88	November 19, 1983	Yager Stadium	Miami	14–10
89	November 22, 1984	Riverfront Stadium	Miami	31–26
90	November 23, 1985	Yager Stadium	Miami	16–10
91	September 13, 1986	Riverfront Stadium	Cincinnati	45–38
92	September 26, 1987	Nippert Stadium	Cincinnati	31–26
93	September 24, 1988	Yager Stadium	Cincinnati	34–18
94	September 23, 1989	Yager Stadium	Cincinnati	30–14
95	September 22, 1990	Riverfront Stadium	Miami	16–12
96	September 28, 1991	Nippert Stadium	Miami	22–9
97	September 19, 1992	Yager Stadium	Miami	17–14
98	September 18, 1993	Nippert Stadium	Cincinnati	30–23
99	September 17, 1994	Yager Stadium	Tie	17–17
100	September 23, 1995	Yager Stadium	Miami	23–16
101	September 28, 1996	Nippert Stadium	Cincinnati	30–23^{3OT}
102	October 25, 1997	Yager Stadium	Cincinnati	34–31^{2OT}
103	October 24, 1998	Nippert Stadium	Miami	41–0
104	October 30, 1999	Yager Stadium	Cincinnati	52–42
105	October 28, 2000	Nippert Stadium	Cincinnati	45–15
106	September 22, 2001	Yager Stadium	Miami	21–14
107	October 5, 2002	Nippert Stadium	Miami	31–26
108	September 27, 2003	Yager Stadium	Miami	42–37
109	September 11, 2004	Nippert Stadium	Cincinnati	45–26
110	September 28, 2005	Yager Stadium	Miami	44–16
111	September 30, 2006	Nippert Stadium	Cincinnati	24–10
112	September 15, 2007	Yager Stadium	Cincinnati	47–10
113	September 20, 2008	Nippert Stadium	Cincinnati	45–20
114	October 3, 2009	Yager Stadium	No. 10 Cincinnati	37–13
115	October 9, 2010	Nippert Stadium	Cincinnati	45–3
116	October 1, 2011	Yager Stadium	Cincinnati	27–0
117	October 6, 2012	Nippert Stadium	Cincinnati	52–14
118	September 21, 2013	Yager Stadium	Cincinnati	14–0
119	September 20, 2014	Paul Brown Stadium	Cincinnati	31–24
120	September 19, 2015	Yager Stadium	Cincinnati	37–33
121	September 24, 2016	Nippert Stadium	Cincinnati	27–20
122	September 16, 2017	Yager Stadium	Cincinnati	21–17
123	September 8, 2018	Paul Brown Stadium	Cincinnati	21–0
124	September 14, 2019	Nippert Stadium	Cincinnati	35–13
125	September 4, 2021	Nippert Stadium	No. 8 Cincinnati	49–14
126	September 17, 2022	Paycor Stadium	Cincinnati	38–17
127	September 16, 2023	Nippert Stadium	Miami	31–24^{OT}
128	September 14, 2024	Yager Stadium	Cincinnati	27–16
129	September 19, 2026	TQL Stadium	Cincinnati	35–31
Series: Cincinnati leads 62–60–7

=== Wins by venue ===
Category	Cincinnati	Miami	Tie
Nippert Stadium	39	40	5
Union Ball Park	4	3	0
Miami Field	2	8	1
Yager Stadium	11	7	1
Riverfront Stadium	2	2	0
Paul Brown Stadium/Paycor Stadium	3	0	0
TQL Stadium	1	0	0

== See also ==
- List of NCAA college football rivalry games
- List of most-played college football series in NCAA Division I
