= 1950 South Dakota State Jackrabbits football team =

American college football season

1950 South Dakota State Jackrabbits football
- Warren Williamson, Herb Bartling, Gene Cheever, Bill Gibbons, Jim Long (left to right)

NCC champion
- Conference: North Central Conference
- Record: 9–0–1 (5–0–1 NCC)
- Head coach: Ralph Ginn (4th season)
- MVP: Warren Williamson
- Captains: George Medchill; Don Bartlett
- Home stadium: State Field

1950 North Central Conference football standings
	Conf.					Overall
Team	W		L		T	W		L		T
South Dakota State $	5	–	0	–	1	9	–	0	–	1
Iowa State Teachers	4	–	2	–	0	4	–	4	–	0
North Dakota	3	–	1	–	2	5	–	2	–	2
Morningside	3	–	2	–	1	6	–	2	–	1
South Dakota	3	–	3	–	0	4	–	5	–	0
Augustana (SD)	1	–	5	–	0	2	–	7	–	0
North Dakota State	0	–	6	–	0	2	–	7	–	0
$ – Conference champion

The 1950 South Dakota State Jackrabbits football team was an American football team that represented South Dakota State College (nown known as South Dakota State University) as a member of the North Central Conference (NCC) during the 1950 college football season. In their fourth season under head coach Ralph Ginn, the Jackrabbits compiled a 9–0–1 record (5–0–1 in conference games), won the NCC championship, and outscored opponents by a total of 381 to 116. They easily defeated rivals North Dakota State (60–0) and South Dakota (54–28) and tied with North Dakota (21–21). The 1950 team finished the season with the best record in school history, surpassing the 1926 team that went undefeated with three ties. The Jackrabbits did not have another undefeated season for 73 years until the 2023 Jackrabbits compiled a 15–0 record to win the Division I FCS national championship.

Senior halfback Warren Williamson, an elusive runner from Hurley, South Dakota, led the team in rushing (1,014 yards), total offense (1,104 yards), and scoring (84 points scored), and was selected as the team's most valuable player. Quarterback Herb Bartling was selected by conference coaches as the NCC player of the year. Seven South Dakota State players won first-team honors on the NCC all-conference team for 1950. Guard George Medchill and end Don Bartlett were the team captains.

The team played its home games at State Field in Brookings, South Dakota.

== Schedule ==
Date	Opponent	Site	Result	Attendance	Source
September 9	St. Cloud State*	State Field; Brookings, SD	W 39–7		
September 16	at Iowa State Teachers	Cedar Falls, IA	W 34–13	6,000	
September 23	Morningside	State Field; Brookings, SD	W 31–7		
September 29	Augustana (SD)	State Field; Brookings, SD	W 20–12		
October 7	St. Olaf*	State Field; Brookings, SD	W 41–14		
October 14	at North Dakota State	Dacotah Field; Fargo, ND (rivalry)	W 60–0		
October 21	North Dakota	State Field; Brookings, SD (Hobo Day)	T 21–21	9,000–9,500	
October 28	at South Dakota	Vermillion, SD (rivalry)	W 54–28	8,000–10,000	
November 4	at Wayne (MI)*	University of Detroit Stadium; Detroit, MI	W 40–0	2,911	
November 11	at Carleton*	Northfield, MN	W 41–14		
*Non-conference game

== Game summaries ==
Co-captains Don Bartlett and George Medchill

=== St. Cloud State ===
South Dakota State opened its season on September 9 with a 39–7 victory over St. Cloud State. The Jackrabbits tallied 318 rushing yards and 89 passing yards.

=== Iowa State Teachers ===
On September 16, the Jackrabbits defeated Iowa State Teachers (IST), 34–13, at Cedar Falls, Iowa. The victory broke a 23-game IST winning streak in conference games and eliminated them from contention for an eighth consecutive NCC championship. IST took an early 13–7 lead before the Jackrabbits scored 27 points for the win.

=== Morningside ===
On September 23, the Jackrabbits defeated Morningside, 31–7, in Brookings. They gained 372 yards in the game, all on the ground. Quarterback Herb Bartling and fullback Bill Gibbons scored two touchdowns each.

=== Augustana ===
The Jackrabbits narrowly defeated Augustana, 20–12, after traling, 12–7, at halftime. Augustana's first touchdown was set up by a blocked kick at the four-yard line. Warren Williamson scored two touchdowns in the second half to lead the Jackrabbits' comeback.

=== St. Olaf ===
On October 7, the Jackrabbits defeated St. Olaf, 41–14, in Brookings. They tallied 429 rushing yards in the game. Halfback Gene Cheever scored three touchdowns. St. Olaf's first points came on a freak play in which a pass slipped out of the hands of a St. Olaf receiver (George Trout) into the hands of a Jackrabbit, then back into the hands of the receiver who ran 53 yards for a touchdown.

=== North Dakota State ===
On October 14, the Jackrabbits ran up their highest score of the season, defeating North Dakota State, 60–0, in Fargo, North Dakota. The Jackrabbits tallied 359 rushing yards and scored nine touchdowns, led by hallfback Warren Williamson who scored three touchdowns. Late in the fourth quarter, North Dakota State crossed midfield for the first time but lost the ball on a fumble. It remains the most one-sided outcome in the history of the North Dakota State-South Dakota State rivalry since the first game in 1903.

=== North Dakota ===
On October 21, the Jackrabbits played the 39th annual "Hobo Day" game before 9,500 spectators in Brookings. They fell behind North Dakota, 21–7. The Jackrabbits began a comeback by scoring a touchdown with 11 minutes and 11 seconds remaining in the game. With five minutes remaining, South Dakota State quarterback Herb Bartling had a pass intercepted in the ene zone, but shortly thereafter Roger Anderson recovered a North Dakota fumble at the seven-yard line. The Jackrabbits drew to within a point on a touchdown run by Warren Williams. George Medchill missed the extra point, but a penalty gave him a second chance, which he converted to tie the game with 2:52 remaining.

=== South Dakota ===
On October 28, the Jackrabbits defeated their cross-state rival, South Dakota, 54–28, before a Dakota Day crowd of 10,000 at Vermillion, South Dakota. Fullback Bill Gibbons scored three touchdowns, and halfback Warren Williamson scored two. Guard George Medchill kicked six extra points. The combined total of 82 points was the highest in the history of the South Dakota–South Dakota State football rivalry. The win secured the NCC title for South Dakota State.

=== Wayne ===
The Jackrabbits travelled to Detroit for a November 4 game against the Wayne Tartars. They defeated the Tartars, 40–0, before a homecoming crowd of 2,911. The teams appeared evenly matched in the first half. The Jackrabbits began the first quarter, going for it on fourth down and 12 yards to go from their own 18-yard line. Gene Cheever ran for 22 yards to convert the first down, and fullback Bill Gibbons ran 22 yards for the touchdown. The Jackrabbits did not advance past midfield for the remainder of the first half and led, 6–0, at halftime. In the third quarter, the Jackrabbits scored four touchdowns, turning the game into a rout.

=== Carleton ===
South Dakota State concluded its season on November 11 with a 41–14 victory over Carleton at Northfield, Minnesota. George Medchill opened the scoring with an interception and 60-yard return for touchdown. End Marv Kool had two touchdown receptions. Halfback Gene Cheever also scored two touchdowns. Warren Williamson ran for one touchdown and passed for another.

== Team statistics and records ==
The Jackrabbits operated on offense out of a "Missouri T" formation (a variation of the Split-T). They tallied a total of 3,487 rushing yards and 651 passing yards. On defense, they held opponents to 1,243 rushing yards and 1,044 passing yards. Their average of 348.7 yards of rushing yards per game ranked second nationally among small colleges. The team's average of 38.1 points per game set new NCC and school scoring records. Other South Dakota State records broken by the 1950 team included: most points in one season (381); most rushing yardage in a season (3,487); and most total offense in a season (4,138 yards).

== Individual statistics and honors ==
Warren Williamson

Halfback Warren Williamson was selected as the team's most valuable player. His 72 points in six NCC games set a new conference record. In all ten games, he scored 84 points (14 touchdowns) and gained 1,014 rushing yards on 137 carries. Williamson also passed for 89 yards, giving him 1,103 yards of total offense. His 1,103 yards of total offense ranked second nationally among small college players. Williamson later served as South Dakota State's wrestling coach (1956–1973) and was inducted into the South Dakota Sports Hall of Fame in 1990.

Quarterback Herb Bartling, a senior from Brookings, South Dakota, completed 29 of 68 passes for 411 yards, five touchdowns, and seven interceptions. He also punted 28 times for an average 36.7 yards with two punts blocked. Bartling was selected by the conference coaches as the most valuable player of the year in the NCC. At the end of the 1950 season, one sportwriter called Bartling "a smooth, deceptive ball handler, an alert field general, and an excellent passer." Bartling was inducted into the South Dakota Sports Hall of Fame in 2014.

Halfback Gene Cheever, also a senior from Brookings, ranked second on the team in both rushing (839 rushing yards on 89 carries) and scoring (78 points on 13 touchdowns).

Fullback Bill Gibbons, a senior from Lemmon, South Dakota, ranked third on the team with 813 rushing yards and 54 points scored.

End Marvin Kool, a junior from Hawarden, Iowa, led the team with 18 receptions for 257 yards.

Ralph Ginn was received the NCC coach of the year award. Seven South Dakota State players received first-team honors on the All-NCC team selected by conference coaches. The honorees were: end Don Bartlett; tackle Dale Bowyer; center Howard Amen; guard George Medchill; quarterback Herb Bartling; halfback Warren Williamson; and fullback Harry Gibbons.

Guard/linebacker George Medchill and end Don Bartlett were the team captains.

== Personnel ==
=== Players ===
- Howard "Gabby" Amen, center, senior, 6', 187 pounds, Canton, SD
- Roger Anderson, tackle, sophomore, 6', 197 pounds, Spearfish, SD
- Charles Anderson, end, senior, 6'2", 180 pounds, Jackson, MN
- Eugene Balster, end, junior, 6'2", 186 pounds, Kimball, SD
- Don Bartlett, end and co-captain senior, 6', 178 pounds, Centerville, SD
- Herb Bartling, quarterback, senior, 6', 173 pounds, Brookings, SD
- Dale Bowyer, tackle, junior, 5'11", 218 pounds, Yankton, SD
- Bob Bresee, quarterback, junior, 5'9", 170 pounds, Sioux Falls, SD
- Arlie Brooks, fullback, junior, 183 pounds, Philip, SD
- Gene Cheever, halfback, senior, 160 pounds, 5'10", Brookings, SD
- Ed Conway, halfback, sophomore, 5'8", 148 pounds, Platte, SD
- Dick Craddock, end, junior, 5'9", 170 pounds, Spencer, IA
- Darwin Deim, end, senior, 6', 184 pounds, Swea City, IA
- George Robert "Bob" Durland, guard, sophomore, 5'10", 185 pounds, Brookings, SD
- Doug Eggers, center, junior, 5'11", 185 pounds, Wagner, SD
- Waldon Eggers, center, junior, 5'11", 175 pounds, Wagner, SD
- Homer Englund, guard, senior, 6', 182 pounds, Clark, SD
- Harry B. "Bill" Gibbons, fullback, senior, 6', 192 pounds, Lemmon, SD
- Les Gieneart, tackle, sophomore, 6', 208 pounds, Marshall, MN
- Edgar Gosmire, halfback, junior, 6', 183 pounds, Winfred, SD
- Louis Guida, guard, sophomore, 5'8", 211 pounds, Chicago
- George "Gus" Hamm, halfback, sophomore, 5'9", 163 pounds, Rapid City, SD
- Dallas Hoff, halfback, sophomore, 5'10-1/2", 180 pounds, Aberdeen, SD
- Norman Isaksen, tackle, junior, 6', 203 pounds, Brookings, SD
- Don Jones, end, sophomore, 6'2", 186 pounds, Rapid City, SD
- Gene Juve, fullback, sophomore, 5'11", 183 pounds, Watertown, SD
- Earle Kinsman, center, sophomore, 6', 190 pounds, Watertown, SD
- Marv Kool, end, junior, 6'2", 190 pounds, Hawarden, IA
- Leonard Kortmeyer, center, sophomore, 6', 194 pounds, Burke, SD
- Al Larson, tackle, senior, 5'11", 202 pounds, Spearfish, SD
- Jim Long, halfback, senior, 5'10", 175 pounds, Lemmon, SD
- George "Mitch" Medchill, guard, linebacker and co-captain, senior, 5'11", 192 pounds, Hazel Run, MN
- George Milfs, quarterback, sophomore, 5'11", 163 pounds, Brookings, SD
- Dick Peot, center, senior, 6'2", 251 pounds, LaGrange, IL
- Fred Petersen, tackle, sophomore, 6', 198 pounds, Parker, SD
- Dwane Pins, tackle, junior, 5'11", 184 pounds, Sioux Falls, SD
- Richard Reyer, center, sophomore, 6'2", 206 pounds, Hudson, SD
- Jack Richardson, end, sophomore, 6'2", 182 pounds, Parker, SD
- Wayne Sinning, guard, sophomore, 6', 191 pounds, Canton, SD
- Dick Smith, halfback, sophomore, 5'9", 158 pounds, Brookings, SD
- Jack Stenson, quarterback, senior, 5'11", 172 pounds, Yankton, SD
- Paul Stumley, tackle, senior, 6', 211 pounds, Brookings, SD
- John Sutton, guard, junior, 5'9", 172 pounds, Onida, SD
- Russ Tarver, tackle, sophomore, 6'1", 172 pounds, Onida, SD
- Don Veal, guard, sophomore, 6'1", 186 pounds, Lemmon, SD
- Vern Whitley, quarterback, junior, 5'10", 164 pounds, Gregory, SD
- Warren Williamson, halfback, senior, 5'9", 166 pounds, Hurley, SD
- Dick Zick, fullback, junior, 5'10", 196 pounds, Aberdeen, SD
- Forest Zimmerman, quarterback, sophomore, 6' 1/2", 168 pounds, Aberdeen, SD

=== Coaches and administrators ===
- Head coach: Ralph Ginn
- Assistant coaches: Bob Danielson (line coach), Erv Heuther (backfield coach and namesake of Erv Huether Field), Harold Holmes (freshman)
- Athletic director: Reuben B. "Jack" Frost
- Trainer: Jim Emmerich
