= Jim Long (American football) =

American football coach, athletics administrator (1926–2014)

- Long (on right) with teammates on the 1950 South Dakota State team

Biographical details
- Born: December 30, 1926; Olivia, Minnesota, U.S.
- Died: April 18, 2014 (aged 87); Sioux Falls, South Dakota, U.S.

Playing career

Football
- 1948–1950: South Dakota State
- Position: Halfback

Coaching career (HC unless noted)

Football
- 1951: Britton HS (SD) (assistant)
- 1952: Ipswich HS (SD)
- 1953: Huron (assistant)
- 1954–1959: Huron

Track and field
- 1954–1959: Huron (assistant)

Administrative career (AD unless noted)
- 1957–1960: Huron

Head coaching record
- Overall: 38–14–2

Accomplishments and honors

Championships
- 3 SDIC (1957–1959)

James Arthur Long (December 30, 1926 – April 18, 2014) was an American football and track and field coach and athletics administrator. He served as the head football coach at Huron College—later known as Huron University—in Huron, South Dakota from 1954 to 1959.

A native of Lemmon, South Dakota, Long graduated from Lemmon High School in 1944. After serving in the United States Army Air Forces during World War II, he attended Stanford University for a year before returning to South Dakota. At South Dakota State College—now known as South Dakota State University, Long played football as a halfback from 1948 to 1950 on teams coached by Ralph Ginn, including the undefeated 1950 South Dakota State Jackrabbits football team. He began his coaching career in 1951 as an assistant football coach at Britton High School in Britton, South Dakota. The next year, he was the head football coach at Ipswich High School in Ipswich, South Dakota. Long went to Huron in 1953 as an assistant under Ralph Lundeen before succeeding him as head football coach in 1954. Long was also appointed head track coach at Huron in 1954, and was named the school's athletic director in 1957. He resigned from his position at Huron in January 1960 to become a sales representative with a clay products business based in Black Hills, South Dakota. His Huron football teams had a record of 43–9–2 on the field in his six seasons as head coach.

At Huron, Long mentored Garney Henley, who went on to star in the Canadian Football League (CFL), and was inducted into the Canadian Football Hall of Fame. Long died on April 18, 2014, in Sioux Falls, South Dakota.

== Head coaching record ==
=== College football ===
Year	Team	Overall	Conference	Standing	Bowl/playoffs	NAIA^{#}
Huron Scalpers (South Dakota Intercollegiate Conference) (1954–1959)
1954	Huron	6–3	5–3	3rd		
1955	Huron	5–2–1	5–1–1	2nd		
1956	Huron	2–7 (Note: Huron received a forfeit win from Northern State, but later forfeited six conference wins and the South Dakota Intercollegiate Conference title from the 1956 season because of an ineligible player.)	1–6	9th		
1957	Huron	7–1	7–0	1st		
1958	Huron	9–0–1	7–0–1	1st		
1959	Huron	9–1	7–1	T–1st		14
Huron:		38–14–2	32–11–2			
Total:		38–14–2				
National championship Conference title Conference division title or championship game berth
^{#}Rankings from final NAIA poll.
