= 1950 Detroit Titans football team =

American college football season

1950 Detroit Titans football
- Conference: Missouri Valley Conference
- Record: 6–3–1 (2–1–1 MVC)
- Head coach: Chuck Baer (6th season)
- Captains: Tom Costello; Nick Galante
- Home stadium: University of Detroit Stadium

1950 Missouri Valley Conference football standings
	Conf.					Overall
Team	W		L		T	W		L		T
No. 19 Tulsa $	3	–	0	–	1	9	–	1	–	1
Detroit	2	–	1	–	1	6	–	3	–	1
Wichita	3	–	2	–	0	5	–	4	–	1
Drake	1	–	2	–	1	6	–	2	–	1
Oklahoma A&M	1	–	2	–	1	4	–	6	–	1
Bradley	0	–	3	–	0	5	–	5	–	0
$ – Conference champion; Rankings from AP Poll

The 1950 Detroit Titans football team represented the University of Detroit in the 1950 college football season. Detroit outscored its opponents by a combined total of 226 to 143 and finished with a 6–3–1 record in its sixth year under head coach Chuck Baer. It was the 56th season of intercollegiate football for the University of Detroit.

The Titans had won the Missouri Valley Conference (MVC) championship in 1949 and were co-favorites with Tulsa to win the conference championship in 1950. The Titans ultimately finished in second place behind Tulsa.

Two Titans were selected as first-team players on the 1950 All-Missouri Valley Conference football team: guards Alex Smail and Ed Wood.

Dutch Clark, later inducted into both the Pro and College Football Halls of Fame, joined the Titans' staff as backfield coach in 1950. Bob Ivory and Eddie Barbour were also assistant coaches for the 1950 team. Bob O'Malley and Mike Kaysserian were hired to coach the freshman team.

End Tom Costello and Nick Galante were co-captains of the 1950 team. After the season, fullback Mike Goggins and tackle Joe Kutz were named captains of the 1951 team.

In late December 1950, Chuck Baer resigned as the Titans' head football coach, citing "personal reasons". The resignation was considered a surprise, but followed rumors of a shakeup after the university president, the Very Rev. Celestin J. Steiner, appointed a committee to investigate and make recommendations about the university's entire athletic program.

== Schedule ==
Date	Opponent	Site	Result	Attendance	Source
September 22	Hillsdale*	University of Detroit Stadium; Detroit, MI	W 40–0	12,451	
September 29	Wayne*	University of Detroit Stadium; Detroit, MI	W 34–0	19,257	
October 6	Wichita	University of Detroit Stadium; Detroit, MI	L 13–21		
October 13	Marquette*	University of Detroit Stadium; Detroit, MI	L 13–27	12,356	
October 21	at Tulsa	Skelly Stadium; Tulsa, OK	T 13–13	12,356	
October 27	Drake	University of Detroit Stadium; Detroit, MI	W 14–13	6,255	
November 3	Villanova*	University of Detroit Stadium; Detroit, MI	W 18–7	8,775	
November 12	Duquesne*	University of Detroit Stadium; Detroit, MI	W 47–14	7,129	
November 18	at Oklahoma A&M	Lewis Field; Stillwater, OK	W 20–13		
November 26	at San Francisco*	Kezar Stadium; San Francisco, CA	L 13–35	11,783	
*Non-conference game

== Players ==
- Ed Beirne, end
- Tom Costello, end and co-captain
- Miles Currie, end
- Nick Galante, guard and co-captain
- Mike Goggins, fullback
- Ron Horwath, left halfback
- Danny Kerins, tackle
- Johnny "Red" O'Connor, quarterback
- Jack O'Leary, right halfback
- Dick Neveux, quarterback
- John Packo, center
- Alex Smail, guard
- Lee Wittmer, tackle
- Ed Wood, guard

== See also ==
- 1950 in Michigan
