= 1950 SMU Mustangs football team =

American college football season

1950 SMU Mustangs football
- Conference: Southwest Conference
- Record: 6–4 (2–4 SWC)
- Head coach: Rusty Russell (1st season)
- Captains: Kyle Rote; Bobby Collier
- Home stadium: Cotton Bowl

1950 Southwest Conference football standings
	Conf.					Overall
Team	W		L		T	W		L		T
No. 3 Texas $	6	–	0	–	0	9	–	2	–	0
Baylor	4	–	2	–	0	7	–	3	–	0
Texas A&M	3	–	3	–	0	7	–	4	–	0
TCU	3	–	3	–	0	5	–	5	–	0
Rice	2	–	4	–	0	6	–	4	–	0
SMU	2	–	4	–	0	6	–	4	–	0
Arkansas	1	–	5	–	0	2	–	8	–	0
$ – Conference champion; Rankings from AP Poll

The 1950 SMU Mustangs football team represented Southern Methodist University (SMU) as a member of the Southwest Conference (SWC) during the 1950 college football season. Led by first-year head coach Rusty Russell, the Mustangs compiled an overall record of 6–4 with a mark of 2–4 in conference play, tying for fifth place in the SWC. SMU played home games at the Cotton Bowl in Dallas. Kyle Rote and Bobby Collier were the team captains.

== Schedule ==
Date	Opponent	Rank	Site	Result	Attendance	Source
September 23	Georgia Tech*	No. 10	Cotton Bowl; Dallas, TX	W 33–13	54,000	
September 30	at No. 11 Ohio State*	No. 10	Ohio Stadium; Columbus, OH	W 32–27	80,672	
October 7	at Missouri*	No. 3	Memorial Stadium; Columbia, MO	W 21–0	35,311	
October 14	Oklahoma A&M*	No. 2	Cotton Bowl; Dallas, TX	W 56–0	75,349	
October 21	at No. 15 Rice	No. 3	Rice Stadium; Houston, TX (rivalry)	W 42–21	70,000	
November 4	at No. 7 Texas	No. 1	Memorial Stadium; Austin, TX	L 20–23	65,498	
November 11	Texas A&M	No. 7	Cotton Bowl; Dallas, TX	L 20–25	75,447	
November 18	at Arkansas	No. 14	War Memorial Stadium; Little Rock, AR	W 14–7	29,000	
November 25	Baylor	No. 15	Cotton Bowl; Dallas, TX	L 0–3	50,000	
December 2	TCU		Cotton Bowl; Dallas, TX (rivalry)	L 13–27	55,000	
*Non-conference game; Rankings from AP Poll released prior to the game
