= Bob Winslow =

American football player and coach (1916–1994)

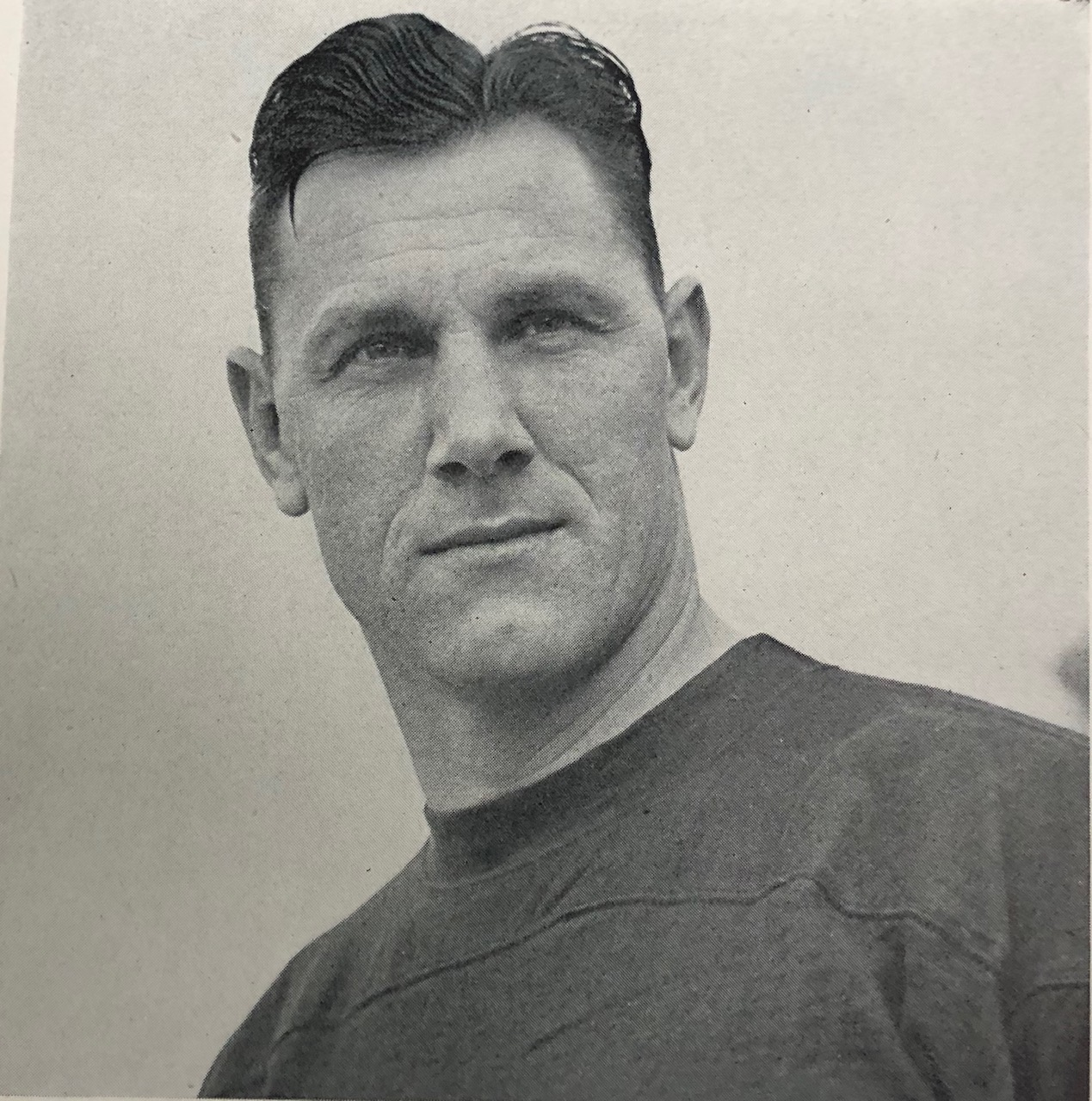
- Winslow from 1946 USC yearbook

Biographical details
- Born: September 18, 1916; Rifle, Colorado, U.S.
- Died: January 11, 1994 (aged 77); Fallbrook, California, U.S.

Playing career
- 1937–1939: USC
- 1940: Detroit Lions
- 1940: Brooklyn Dodgers
- 1944: Hollywood Rangers
- Positions: End, quarterback

Coaching career (HC unless noted)
- 1943–1946: USC (backfield)
- 1947: Detroit Lions (assistant)
- 1948: USC (backfield)
- 1949–1951: Arizona

Head coaching record
- Overall: 12–18–1

Robert E. Winslow (September 18, 1916 – January 11, 1994) was an American football player and coach. He served as the head football coach at the University of Arizona from 1949 to 1951, compiling a record of 12–18–1.

In 1944, Winslow played for the Hollywood Rangers of the short-lived American Football League, an eight-team organization based on the Pacific Coast. Head coach Bill Sargent moved him from end to quarterback, which the United Press partly credited for the team's success. The Rangers finished in first place with a perfect 11–0 record in the league's only season.

His son, Troy Winslow, played as a quarterback at USC in the 1960s.

== Head coaching record ==
Year	Team	Overall	Conference	Standing	Bowl/playoffs
Arizona Wildcats (Border Conference) (1949–1951)
1949	Arizona	2–7–1	2–4	6th	
1950	Arizona	4–6	2–4	6th	
1951	Arizona	6–5	4–3	5th	
Arizona:		12–18–1	7-11		
Total:		12–18–1			
