= Blair Cherry =

American football and baseball coach (1901–1966)

Biographical details
- Born: August 7, 1901; Kerens, Texas, U.S.
- Died: September 10, 1966 (aged 65); Lubbock, Texas, U.S.

Playing career

Football
- 1920–1923: TCU

Baseball
- ?–1924: TCU
- Positions: End (football); Center fielder (baseball)

Coaching career (HC unless noted)

Football
- 1926–1928: Ranger HS (TX)
- 1929: North Side HS (TX)
- 1930–1936: Amarillo HS (TX)
- 1937–1946: Texas (assistant)
- 1947–1950: Texas

Baseball
- 1943–1945: Texas

Head coaching record
- Overall: 32–10–1 (college football); 30–23 (college baseball)
- Bowls: 2–1

Accomplishments and honors

Championships
- Football; 1 SWC (1950) Baseball; 2 SWC regular season (1943, 1945)

Johnson Blair Cherry (August 7, 1901 – September 10, 1966) was an American football and baseball coach. He served as the head football coach at the University of Texas at Austin from 1947 to 1950, compiling a record of 32–10–1. His 1950 Texas Longhorns football team won the Southwest Conference (SWC) championship and appeared in the 1951 Cotton Bowl Classic, losing to Tennessee. Cherry was also the head baseball coach at Texas from 1943 to 1945, tallying a mark of 30–23 and winning SWC titles in 1943 and 1945. He attended Texas Christian University (TCU), where he starred football as an end and was captain of the 1923 TCU Horned Frogs football team. He also played baseball at TCU, as a center fielder. Cherry began his coaching career at the high school level in Texas, making stops at Ranger High School, North Side High School in Fort Worth, and Amarillo High School.

== Early life ==
Cherry was born in Kerens, Texas, on August 7, 1901. He played his high school ball at Weatherford High School and later attended Texas Christian University in Fort Worth in the early 1920s and was a three-sport star. Upon graduation in 1924, he had a brief professional baseball career but soon entered the coaching profession. In 1936, he married Florence Snodgrass of Amarillo, with whom he had two children.

== Coaching career ==
=== High school ===
Cherry's first coaching position was at Ranger High School in Ranger, Texas, where he spent three seasons, from 1926 to 1928.

In 1929, Cherry coached for one season at North Side High School in Fort Worth.

In 1930, Cherry was named head football coach at Amarillo High School. He compiled a record of 84–5 losses, with 45 of those wins by shutout. The average score in these games was 30–5. Amarillo High became the second school in Texas to win three straight state championships, in 1934, 1935, and 1936 (first was the Paul Tyson-coached Waco High in 1925, 1926, and 1927), allowing the opponent teams only a combined 13 points in these three championship games.

=== University of Texas ===
==== Football ====
Cherry was considered as a candidate for the head coach position at the University of Texas at Austin in 1937, but was passed over for the better-known Dana X. Bible. Bible offered Cherry a position as an assistant coach on his staff. Bible groomed Cherry to be his successor, and upon Bible's retirement in 1946, Cherry was appointed as head coach.

As head coach, Cherry switched the Longhorns' offense from a single-wing formation to the now-popular T formation, and found instant success. With Bobby Layne at quarterback, Texas earned a 10–1 record in his first year, a final ranking of fifth, and a defeat of sixth-ranked Alabama in the 1948 Sugar Bowl.

In the 1948 season, his team compiled a 7–3–1 record and defeated eighth-ranked Georgia in the Orange Bowl. Following this season, Cherry was offered head coaching jobs by the Washington Redskins and Chicago Cardinals of the National Football League (NFL), but turned down these offers to remain the head coach at Texas.

In 1949, Cherry's Longhorns compiled a 6–4 record.

In 1950, the Longhorns won the Southwest Conference title with a 6–0 conference record, and earned a berth in the Cotton Bowl Classic, as well as a #3 final national ranking. Mid-season, Cherry announced that he would be retiring from coaching, and his last game was a 20–14 defeat at the hands of Tennessee in the 1951 Cotton Bowl Classic.

Cherry was suffering from ulcers and insomnia at the time of his retirement, and later hinted in the article "Why I Quit Coaching" that harsh criticism from fans and media, despite his 32–10–1 record and two top-five finishes, led to his decision to retire.

==== Baseball ====
Cherry also served as baseball coach from 1943 to 1945 during Bibb Falk's absence. His teams compiled a 30–23 overall record, but won two conference titles with a 22–4 conference mark in three seasons. No SWC title was awarded in 1944.

== Later life, death, and honors ==
After retiring from coaching, Cherry moved to Lubbock, Texas, to enter the oil business, partnering with his brother, A. W. Cherry. He died on September 10, 1966, from a coronary occultation, three weeks after undergoing a kidney operation and then returning to the hospital with chest pains. Blair was buried at Llano Cemetery in Amarillo.

Cherry was inducted into the Texas Sports Hall of Fame shortly before his death in 1966 and posthumously inducted into the Longhorn Hall of Honor in 1968.

== Head coaching record ==
=== College football ===
Year	Team	Overall	Conference	Standing	Bowl/playoffs	Coaches^{#}	AP^{°}
Texas Longhorns (Southwest Conference) (1947–1950)
1947	Texas	10–1	5–1	2nd	W Sugar		5
1948	Texas	7–3–1	4–1–1	2nd	W Orange		
1949	Texas	6–4	3–3	T–3rd			
1950	Texas	9–2	6–0	1st	L Cotton	2	3
Texas:		32–10–1	18–5–1				
Total:		32–10–1					
National championship Conference title Conference division title or championship game berth
^{#}Rankings from final Coaches Poll.; ^{°}Rankings from final AP Poll.

=== College baseball ===
Record table
Season	Team	Overall	Conference	Standing	Postseason
Texas Longhorns (Southwest Conference) (1943–1945)
1943	Texas	6–2	6–2	T–1st	
1944	Texas	7–3			
1945	Texas	11–1	10–1	1st	
Texas:		24–6 (.800)	22–4 (.846)		
Total:		24–6 (.800)			
National champion Postseason invitational champion Conference regular season champion Conference regular season and conference tournament champion Division regular season champion Division regular season and conference tournament champion Conference tournament champion
