= 1950 Oklahoma A&M Cowboys football team =

American college football season

1950 Oklahoma A&M Cowboys football
- Conference: Missouri Valley Conference
- Record: 4–6–1 (1–2–1 MVC)
- Head coach: Jennings B. Whitworth (1st season)
- Home stadium: Lewis Field

1950 Missouri Valley Conference football standings
| | Conf. | | | | | Overall |
| Team | W | | L | | T | W | | L | | T |
|---|---|---|---|---|---|---|---|---|---|---|
| No. 19 Tulsa $ | 3 | – | 0 | – | 1 | 9 | – | 1 | – | 1 |
| Detroit | 2 | – | 1 | – | 1 | 6 | – | 3 | – | 1 |
| Wichita | 3 | – | 2 | – | 0 | 5 | – | 4 | – | 1 |
| Drake | 1 | – | 2 | – | 1 | 6 | – | 2 | – | 1 |
| Oklahoma A&M | 1 | – | 2 | – | 1 | 4 | – | 6 | – | 1 |
| Bradley | 0 | – | 3 | – | 0 | 5 | – | 5 | – | 0 |
$ – Conference champion; Rankings from AP Poll

The 1950 Oklahoma A&M Cowboys football team represented Oklahoma Agricultural and Mechanical College (later renamed Oklahoma State University–Stillwater) in the Missouri Valley Conference during the 1950 college football season.

At the end of the 1949 season, Jim Lookabaugh resigned after 11 years as Oklahoma A&M's head football coach, and Jennings B. Whitworth, an assistant coach at Georgia, was hired as his replacement. In their first season under coach Whitworth, the Cowboys compiled a 4–6–1 record (1–2–1 against conference opponents), tied for fourth place in the conference, and were outscored by opponents by a combined total of 259 to 159. Two of the Cowboys' games resulted in losses to teams ranked No. 1 (Oklahoma, 14–41) and No. 2 (SMU, 0–56) in the AP Poll.

On offense, the 1950 team averaged 14.5 points, 149.45 rushing yards, and 83.09 passing yards per game. On defense, the team allowed an average of 23.5 points, 232.82 rushing yards and 82.18 passing yards per game. The team's statistical leaders included halfback Bob Cook with 411 rushing yards (albeit on 205 carries) and 654 passing yards, Arlen McNeil with 263 receiving yards, and Wayne Johnson with six interceptions.

Bob Cook received first-team All-Missouri Valley Conference honors.

The team played its home games at Lewis Field in Stillwater, Oklahoma. Prior to the 1950 season, 10,600 seats were added as part of renovations to the north side, increasing the seating capacity to 39,000.

== Schedule ==
| Date | Opponent | Site | Result | Attendance | Source |
|---|---|---|---|---|---|
| September 23 | at Arkansas* | War Memorial Stadium; Little Rock, AR | W 12–7 | 24,000 | |
| September 30 | TCU* | Lewis Field; Stillwater, OK | W 13–7 | 17,500 | |
| October 7 | at Drake | Drake Stadium; Des Moines, IA | T 14–14 | | |
| October 14 | at No. 2 SMU* | Cotton Bowl; Dallas, TX | L 0–56 | 75,349 | |
| October 21 | at Kansas* | Memorial Stadium; Lawrence, KS | L 7–40 | 22,500 | |
| October 29 | Missouri*^{†} | Lewis Field; Stillwater, OK | L 0–27 | | |
| November 4 | at Tulsa | Skelly Field; Tulsa, OK (rivalry) | L 13–27 | 15,350 | |
| November 11 | at Wichita State | Veterans Field; Wichita, KS | W 32–20 | | |
| November 18 | Detroit | Lewis Field; Stillwater, OK | L 13–20 | | |
| November 25 | Kansas State* | Lewis Field; Stillwater, OK | W 41–0 | | |
| December 2 | No. 1 Oklahoma* | Lewis Field; Stillwater, OK (Bedlam) | L 14–41 | 28,530 | |
*Non-conference game; ^{†}Homecoming; Rankings from AP Poll released prior to the game

== After the season ==
The 1951 NFL draft was held on January 18–19, 1951. The following Cowboys were selected.

| Round | Pick | Player | Position | NFL team |
|---|---|---|---|---|
| 1 | 13 | Jim Spavital | Back | New York Giants |
| 17 | 200 | Darrel Meisenheimer | Defensive back | Detroit Lions |
| 18 | 219 | Rube DeRoin | Center | Cleveland Browns |
