= 1951 Cotton Bowl Classic =

- 15th Cotton Bowl Classic
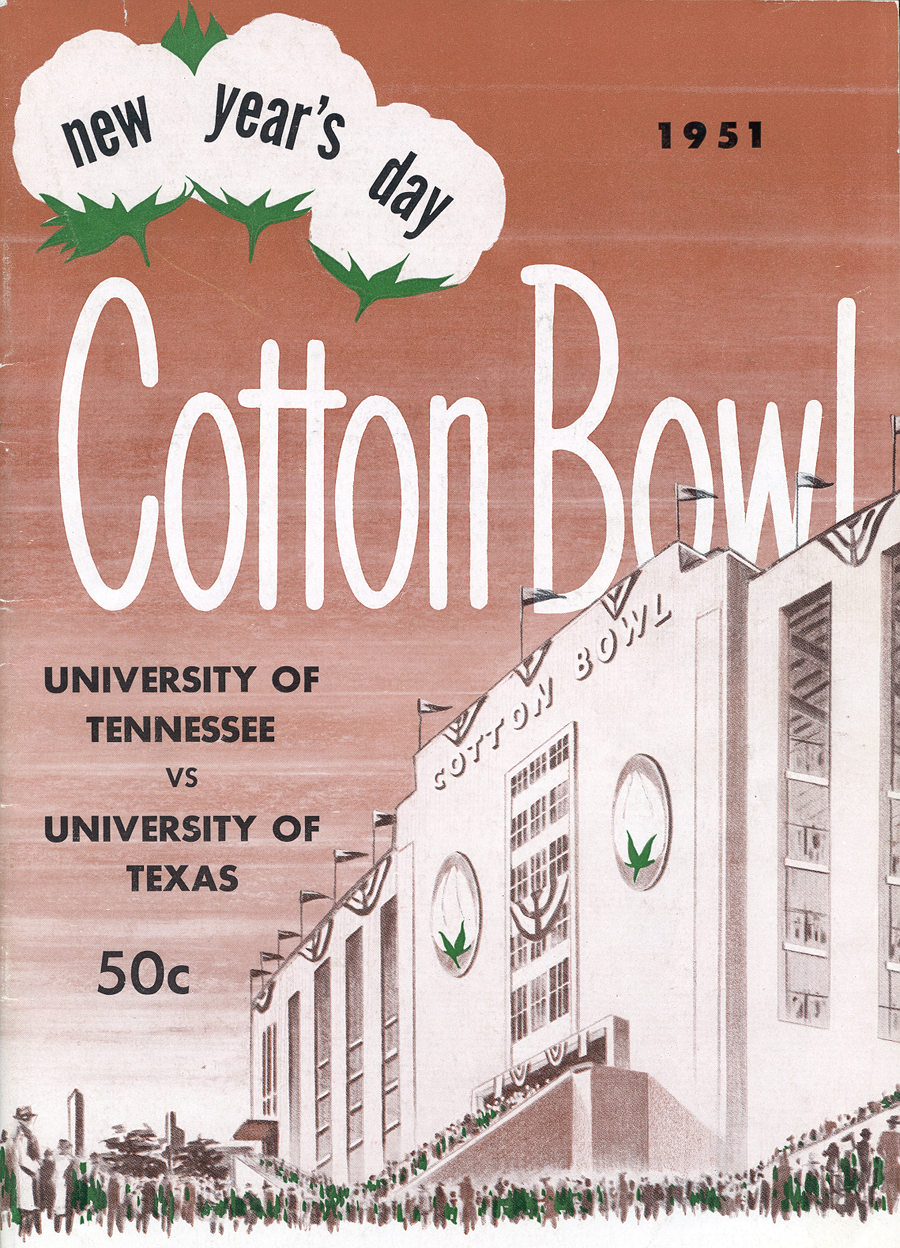
Tennessee Volunteers	Texas Longhorns
(10–1)	(9–1)
SEC	SWC
20	14
Head coach: Robert Neyland	Head coach: Blair Cherry
AP / Coaches; 4 / 5	AP / Coaches; 3 / 4
	1	2	3	4	Total
Tennessee	7	0	0	13	20
Texas	0	14	0	0	14
- Date: January 1, 1951
- Season: 1950
- Stadium: Cotton Bowl
- Location: Dallas, Texas
- MVP: FB Andy Kozar (Tennessee); HB Hank Lauricella (Tennessee); DE Horace Sherrod (Tennessee); G Bud McFadin (Texas)
- Referee: Ray McCulloch (SWC; split crew: SWC, SEC)
- Attendance: 75,500

The Cotton Bowl in Dallas, Texas, hosted the Cotton Bowl Classic.

The 1951 Cotton Bowl Classic was the 15th annual game, and it featured the Tennessee Volunteers and the Texas Longhorns.

== Background ==
Cherry led the Longhorns to a perfect 6-0 SWC record in his final season as the Horns won their first Southwest Conference since the 1945 team. This was their first bowl game since 1949 and first Cotton Bowl Classic since 1946. Tennessee was in their first bowl game since 1947 and first ever Cotton Bowl Classic. They finished second in the Southeastern Conference due to not playing the same number of conference games as SEC champ Kentucky, who they beat.

== Game summary ==
Midway through the first quarter, John Gruble scored on a 5-yard touchdown catch from Herky Payne set up by a Hank Lauricella 75-yard run. Coincidentally, another Lauricella play would set the Longhorns up to score. Early in the second quarter the Vols were pinned in their own 10 on 4th down as Lauricella set up to punt. But his punt was blocked by Jim Lansford and the Longhorns recovered at the 8. On fourth and goal, the Longhorns scored on a Byron Townsend 5-yard touchdown run. Four minutes before the half ended, Gib Dawson caught a 35-yard touchdown pass from Ben Thompkins to give them the lead at halftime. But the Volunteers drove 82 yards in 16 plays and it culminated with an Andy Kozar touchdown run with ten minutes remaining. But Pat Shires' kick went wide as the Horns still led 14–13. But on the ensuing drive, the Longhorns fumbled the ball and Jimmy Hill recovered to give the Vols a chance at Texas' own 43. Five plays later, Andy Kozar ran into the end zone for the winning touchdown with 3:11 remaining. The Longhorns never seriously threatened after that as the Volunteers won their first Cotton Bowl Classic.

== Aftermath ==
Cherry was suffering from ulcers and insomnia before he retired and it was implied in his article soon after that fan/media criticism despite his 32-10-1 record led to his retirement. But the Horns would play in the Cotton Bowl Classic two years later under his replacement, Ed Price and later went to five Cotton Bowls in the 1960s under a new head coach, Darrell Royal. The Volunteers were recognized by several voting sources (National Championship Foundation, Billingley, CFRA, Massy, Dunkel, DeVold, CFI, Frye, Fleming System, Howell, Maxwell, Sorensen) as the 1950 Champion over Oklahoma, so the school claims the title. The Volunteers' next Cotton Bowl was also against Texas, in 1953, which was Coach Neyland's final game.

== Statistics ==
Statistics	Texas	Tennessee
First downs	12	18
Yards rushing	146	295
Yards passing	97	45
Total yards	243	340
Punts-Average	7-29.3	6-32.7
Fumbles-Lost	1-1	4–1
Interceptions	1	2
Penalties-Yards	5-55	4-35
