= 1950 Arkansas Razorbacks football team =

American college football season

1950 Arkansas Razorbacks football
- Conference: Southwest Conference
- Record: 2–8 (1–5 SWC)
- Head coach: Otis Douglas (1st season)
- Captain: George Eckert
- Home stadium: Razorback Stadium; War Memorial Stadium

1950 Southwest Conference football standings
	Conf.					Overall
Team	W		L		T	W		L		T
No. 3 Texas $	6	–	0	–	0	9	–	2	–	0
Baylor	4	–	2	–	0	7	–	3	–	0
Texas A&M	3	–	3	–	0	7	–	4	–	0
TCU	3	–	3	–	0	5	–	5	–	0
Rice	2	–	4	–	0	6	–	4	–	0
SMU	2	–	4	–	0	6	–	4	–	0
Arkansas	1	–	5	–	0	2	–	8	–	0
$ – Conference champion; Rankings from AP Poll

The 1950 Arkansas Razorbacks football team represented the University of Arkansas in the Southwest Conference (SWC) during the 1950 college football season. In their first year under head coach Otis Douglas, the Razorbacks compiled a 2–8 record (1–5 against SWC opponents), finished in last place in the SWC, and were outscored by their opponents by a combined total of 163 to 156. George Eckert was the team captain.

== Schedule ==
Date	Opponent	Site	Result	Attendance	Source
September 23	Oklahoma A&M*	War Memorial Stadium; Little Rock, AR	L 7–12	24,000	
September 30	North Texas State*	Razorback Stadium; Fayetteville, AR	W 50–6	15,000	
October 7	at TCU	Amon G. Carter Stadium; Fort Worth, TX	L 6–13	25,000	
October 14	Baylor	Razorback Stadium; Fayetteville, AR	W 27–6	17,000	
October 21	at No. 7 Texas	Memorial Stadium; Austin, TX (rivalry)	L 14–19	40,000	
October 28	Vanderbilt*	War Memorial Stadium; Little Rock, AR	L 13–14		
November 4	at Texas A&M	Kyle Field; College Station, TX (rivalry)	L 13–42	17,000	
November 11	Rice^{†}	Razorback Stadium; Fayetteville, AR	L 6–9	20,000	
November 18	No. 14 SMU	War Memorial Stadium; Little Rock, AR	L 7–14	29,000	
November 23	at Tulsa*	Skelly Stadium; Tulsa, OK	L 13–28	19,500	
*Non-conference game; ^{†}Homecoming; Rankings from AP Poll released prior to the game
