= 1950 Texas Longhorns football team =

American college football season

1950 Texas Longhorns football

SWC champion

Cotton Bowl Classic, L 14–20 vs. Tennessee
- Conference: Southwest Conference

Ranking
- Coaches: No. 2
- AP: No. 3
- Record: 9–2 (6–0 SWC)
- Head coach: Blair Cherry (4th season)
- Home stadium: Memorial Stadium

1950 Southwest Conference football standings
	Conf.					Overall
Team	W		L		T	W		L		T
No. 3 Texas $	6	–	0	–	0	9	–	2	–	0
Baylor	4	–	2	–	0	7	–	3	–	0
Texas A&M	3	–	3	–	0	7	–	4	–	0
TCU	3	–	3	–	0	5	–	5	–	0
Rice	2	–	4	–	0	6	–	4	–	0
SMU	2	–	4	–	0	6	–	4	–	0
Arkansas	1	–	5	–	0	2	–	8	–	0
$ – Conference champion; Rankings from AP Poll

The 1950 Texas Longhorns football team represented the University of Texas as a member of the Southwest Conference (SWC) during the 1950 college football season. Led by Blair Cherry in his fourth and final season as head coach, the Longhorns compiled an overall record of 9–2 with a mark of 6–0 in conference play, winning the SWC title. Texas was invited to the Cotton Bowl Classic, where the Longhorns lost to Tennessee.

For the September 30 game against Purdue, Texas chose to wear their white uniforms at home. This was the last time the team wore white at home for 70 years, until October 24, 2020.

== Schedule ==
Date	Opponent	Rank	Site	Result	Attendance	Source
September 23	at Texas Tech*	No. 5	Jones Stadium; Lubbock, TX (rivalry)	W 28–14	19,500	
September 30	Purdue*	No. 5	Memorial Stadium; Austin, TX	W 34–26	40,000	
October 14	vs. No. 3 Oklahoma*	No. 4	Cotton Bowl; Dallas, TX (rivalry)	L 13–14	75,346	
October 21	Arkansas	No. 7	Memorial Stadium; Austin, TX (rivalry)	W 19–14	40,000	
October 28	at Rice	No. 7	Rice Stadium; Houston, TX (rivalry)	W 35–7	70,000	
November 4	No. 1 SMU	No. 7	Memorial Stadium; Austin, TX	W 23–20	65,498	
November 11	at Baylor	No. 5	Baylor Stadium; Waco, TX (rivalry)	W 27–20	35,000	
November 18	at TCU	No. 6	Amon G. Carter Stadium; Fort Worth, TX (rivalry)	W 21–7	30,000	
November 30	Texas A&M	No. 3	Memorial Stadium; Austin, TX (rivalry)	W 17–0	65,498	
December 9	LSU*	No. 3	Memorial Stadium; Austin, TX	W 21–6	35,000	
January 1	vs. No. 4 Tennessee*	No. 3	Cotton Bowl; Dallas, TX (Cotton Bowl Classic)	L 14–20	75,500	
*Non-conference game; Rankings from AP Poll released prior to the game

== Awards and honors ==
- Bud McFadin, Guard, Cotton Bowl Classic Co-Most Valuable Player
- Bud McFadin, Consensus All-American
