= 1950 Arizona State–Flagstaff Lumberjacks football team =

American college football season

1950 Arizona State–Flagstaff Lumberjacks football
- Conference: Border Conference
- Record: 2–7 (0–4 Border)
- Head coach: Ben Reiges (1st season)
- Home stadium: Skidmore Field

1950 Border Conference football standings
	Conf.					Overall
Team	W		L		T	W		L		T
West Texas State $	6	–	0	–	0	10	–	1	–	0
Arizona State	4	–	1	–	0	9	–	2	–	0
Texas Western	4	–	2	–	0	7	–	3	–	0
Texas Tech	3	–	2	–	0	3	–	8	–	0
Hardin–Simmons	3	–	3	–	0	5	–	5	–	0
Arizona	2	–	4	–	0	4	–	6	–	0
New Mexico	2	–	5	–	0	2	–	8	–	0
New Mexico A&M	1	–	4	–	0	2	–	7	–	0
Arizona State–Flagstaff	0	–	4	–	0	2	–	7	–	0
$ – Conference champion

The 1950 Arizona State–Flagstaff Lumberjacks football team was an American football team that represented Arizona State College at Flagstaff (now known as Northern Arizona University) in the Border Conference during the 1950 college football season. In its first and only year under head coach Ben Reiges, the team compiled a 2–7 record (0–4 against conference opponents), was outscored by a total of 374 to 114, and finished last of nine teams in the Border Conference.

The team played its home games at Skidmore Field in Flagstaff, Arizona.

== Schedule ==
Date	Opponent	Site	Result	Attendance	Source
September 16	at West Texas State	Buffalo Stadium; Canyon, TX	L 12–52		
September 23	at New Mexico*	Zimmerman Field; Albuquerque, NM	L 0–78	12,000	
September 30	La Verne*	Skidmore Field; Flagstaff, AZ	W 37–20		
October 7	at Arizona State	Goodwin Stadium; Tempe, AZ	L 0–63		
October 14	New Mexico A&M^{†}	Skidmore Field; Flagstaff, AZ	L 14–20		
October 28	New Mexico Highlands*	Skidmore Field; Flagstaff, AZ	W 26–19		
November 4	at Whittier*	Whittier, CA	L 7–28		
November 18	at New Mexico Western*	Silver City, NM	L 6–28		
November 25	at Pepperdine	Gilmore Stadium; Los Angeles, CA	L 12–66		
*Non-conference game; ^{†}Homecoming
