= 1950 Rice Owls football team =

American college football season

1950 Rice Owls football
- Conference: Southwest Conference
- Record: 6–4 (2–4 SWC)
- Head coach: Jess Neely (11th season)
- Home stadium: Rice Stadium

1950 Southwest Conference football standings
	Conf.					Overall
Team	W		L		T	W		L		T
No. 3 Texas $	6	–	0	–	0	9	–	2	–	0
Baylor	4	–	2	–	0	7	–	3	–	0
Texas A&M	3	–	3	–	0	7	–	4	–	0
TCU	3	–	3	–	0	5	–	5	–	0
Rice	2	–	4	–	0	6	–	4	–	0
SMU	2	–	4	–	0	6	–	4	–	0
Arkansas	1	–	5	–	0	2	–	8	–	0
$ – Conference champion; Rankings from AP Poll

The 1950 Rice Owls football team represented Rice Institute during the 1950 college football season. The Owls were led by 11th-year head coach Jess Neely and played their home games at the newly-constructed Rice Stadium in Houston. The team competed as members of the Southwest Conference, finishing tied for fifth.

== Schedule ==
Date	Opponent	Rank	Site	Result	Attendance	Source
September 30	Santa Clara*		Rice Stadium; Houston, TX	W 27–7	68,000	
October 7	LSU*		Rice Stadium; Houston, TX	W 35–20	52,000	
October 14	at Pittsburgh*	No. 15	Pitt Stadium; Pittsburgh, PA	W 14–7	21,061	
October 21	No. 3 SMU	No. 15	Rice Stadium; Houston, TX (rivalry)	L 21–42	70,000	
October 28	No. 7 Texas		Rice Stadium; Houston, TX (rivalry)	L 7–35	70,000	
November 4	Texas Tech*		Rice Stadium; Houston, TX	W 13–7	20,000	
November 11	at Arkansas		Razorback Stadium; Fayetteville, AR	W 9–6	20,000	
November 18	at No. 12 Texas A&M		Kyle Field; College Station, TX	W 21–13	30,000	
November 25	TCU		Rice Stadium; Houston, TX	L 14–26	30,000	
December 2	at Baylor		Baylor Stadium; Waco, TX	L 7–33	20,000	
*Non-conference game; Rankings from AP Poll released prior to the game
