= 1950 Bradley Braves football team =

American college football season

1950 Bradley Braves football
- Conference: Missouri Valley Conference
- Record: 5–5 (0–3 MVC)
- Head coach: Art Bergstrom (3rd season)
- Home stadium: Peoria Stadium

1950 Missouri Valley Conference football standings
| | Conf. | | | | | Overall |
| Team | W | | L | | T | W | | L | | T |
|---|---|---|---|---|---|---|---|---|---|---|
| No. 19 Tulsa $ | 3 | – | 0 | – | 1 | 9 | – | 1 | – | 1 |
| Detroit | 2 | – | 1 | – | 1 | 6 | – | 3 | – | 1 |
| Wichita | 3 | – | 2 | – | 0 | 5 | – | 4 | – | 1 |
| Drake | 1 | – | 2 | – | 1 | 6 | – | 2 | – | 1 |
| Oklahoma A&M | 1 | – | 2 | – | 1 | 4 | – | 6 | – | 1 |
| Bradley | 0 | – | 3 | – | 0 | 5 | – | 5 | – | 0 |
$ – Conference champion; Rankings from AP Poll

The 1950 Bradley Braves football team was an American football team that represented Bradley University as a member of the Missouri Valley Conference (MVC) during the 1950 college football season. Led by Art Bergstrom in his third and final season as head coach, the Braves compiled an overall record of 5–5 with a mark of 0–3 in conference play, placing last out of six teams in the MVC.

== Schedule ==
| Date | Time | Opponent | Site | Result | Attendance | Source |
|---|---|---|---|---|---|---|
| September 23 | | Ripon* | Peoria Stadium; Peoria, IL | W 33–0 | 6,000 | |
| September 30 | | Adams State* | Peoria Stadium; Peoria, IL | W 57–0 | | |
| October 7 | | at Bowling Green* | University Field; Bowling Green, OH | L 14–20 | | |
| October 14 | 2:00 p.m. | at Wichita | Veterans Field; Wichita, KS | L 6–34 | 12,006 | |
| October 21 | | Toledo*^{†} | Peoria Stadium; Peoria, IL | L 20–32 | | |
| October 28 | 8:00 p.m. | Tulsa | Peoria Stadium; Peoria, IL | L 7–74 | 4,500 | |
| November 4 | 1:30 p.m. | at Drake | Drake Stadium; Des Moines, IA | L 14–42 | 7,500 | |
| November 11 | | Wayne* | Peoria Stadium; Peoria, IL | W 33–29 | | |
| November 18 | 3:00 p.m. | at New Mexico* | Zimmerman Field; Albuquerque, NM | W 20–19 | 9,000 | |
| November 23 | 4:00 p.m. | at Cal Poly* | Mustang Stadium; San Luis Obispo, CA | L 35–21 | 2,000 | |
*Non-conference game; ^{†}Homecoming; All times are in Central time
