= 1950 Texas Western Miners football team =

American college football season

1950 Texas Western Miners football
- Conference: Border Conference
- Record: 7–3 (4–2 Border)
- Head coach: Mike Brumbelow (1st season)
- Home stadium: Kidd Field

1950 Border Conference football standings
	Conf.					Overall
Team	W		L		T	W		L		T
West Texas State $	6	–	0	–	0	10	–	1	–	0
Arizona State	4	–	1	–	0	9	–	2	–	0
Texas Western	4	–	2	–	0	7	–	3	–	0
Texas Tech	3	–	2	–	0	3	–	8	–	0
Hardin–Simmons	3	–	3	–	0	5	–	5	–	0
Arizona	2	–	4	–	0	4	–	6	–	0
New Mexico	2	–	5	–	0	2	–	8	–	0
New Mexico A&M	1	–	4	–	0	2	–	7	–	0
Arizona State–Flagstaff	0	–	4	–	0	2	–	7	–	0
$ – Conference champion

The 1950 Texas Western Miners football team was an American football team that represented Texas Western College (now known as University of Texas at El Paso) as a member of the Border Conference during the 1950 college football season. In its first season under head coach Mike Brumbelow, the team compiled a 7–3 record (4–2 against Border Conference opponents), finished third in the conference, and outscored all opponents by a total of 272 to 232.

== Schedule ==
Date	Opponent	Site	Result	Attendance	Source
September 16	at Cincinnati*	Nippert Stadium; Cincinnati, OH	L 0–32		
September 23	New Mexico A&M	Kidd Field; El Paso, TX (rivalry)	W 40–0	7,000	
October 7	Idaho*	Kidd Field; El Paso, TX	W 43–33		
October 14	Arizona	Kidd Field; El Paso, TX	W 14–13	12,000	
October 21	at New Mexico	Zimmerman Field; Albuquerque, NM	W 41–13		
October 28	at Texas Tech	Jones Stadium; Lubbock, TX	L 7–61	13,000	
November 4	West Texas State	Kidd Field; El Paso, TX	L 12–40		
November 11	Hardin–Simmons^{†}	Kidd Field; El Paso, TX	W 21–20	10,000	
November 25	West Virginia*	Kidd Field; El Paso, TX	W 48–7	9,000	
December 1	at Hawaii*	Honolulu Stadium; Honolulu, Territory of Hawaii	W 46–13	12,000	
*Non-conference game; ^{†}Homecoming
