= Otis Douglas =

American gridiron football player and coach (1911–1989)

No. 71
- Position: Offensive tackle

Personal information
- Born: July 25, 1911; Reedville, Virginia, U.S.
- Died: March 21, 1989 (aged 77); Kilmarnock, Virginia, U.S.
- Listed height: 6 ft 1 in (1.85 m)
- Listed weight: 224 lb (102 kg)

Career information
- College: William & Mary
- NFL draft: 1946: undrafted

Career history

Playing
- Philadelphia Eagles (1946–1949)

Coaching
- William & Mary (1935-1938) Line; Akron (1939-1940) Line; Akron (1941-1942) Head coach; Drexel (1948) Assistant; Drexel (1949) Head coach; Arkansas (1950-1952) Head coach; Baltimore Colts (1953) Assistant; Villanova (1954) Assistant; Chicago Cardinals (1955) Assistant (Line coach); Calgary Stampeders (1956–1960)

Awards and highlights
- 2× NFL champion (1948, 1948)

Career NFL statistics
- Games played: 30
- Games started: 3
- Stats at Pro Football Reference

Head coaching record
- Regular season: 17–34–4 (.345)

Otis Whitfield Douglas Jr. (July 25, 1911 – March 21, 1989) was an American football player and coach. He served as the head football coach at the University of Akron (1941–1942), Drexel University (1949), and the University of Arkansas (1950–1952), compiling a career college football coaching record of 17–34–4. He also coached the Calgary Stampeders of the Canadian Football League (CFL) from 1955 to 1960.

After World War II, Douglas played for the Philadelphia Eagles of the National Football League (NFL) for four seasons (1946–1949). In 1946, he became the oldest NFL rookie of all time, at 35 years of age.

Born in Reedville, Virginia, Douglas played college football at the College of William & Mary in 1929 and 1930. He served in United States Navy from 1942 to 1945. Douglas worked as an assistant coach Villanova University under Frank Reagan in 1954. He was an assistant coach for the Baltimore Colts in 1953 and the Chicago Cardinals in 1955, and also was a consultant to the coaching staff of the Cincinnati Reds of Major League Baseball in 1961 and 1962, assisting with physical fitness and morale.

In 1979, Douglas was inducted into the Virginia Sports Hall of Fame.

== Head coaching record ==
=== College ===
Year	Team	Overall	Conference	Standing	Bowl/playoffs
Akron Zippers (Independent) (1941–1942)
1941	Akron	5–3–1			
1942	Akron	0–7–2			
Akron:		5–10–3			
Drexel Dragons (Independent) (1949)
1949	Drexel	3–3–1			
Drexel:		3–3–1			
Arkansas Razorbacks (Southwest Conference) (1950–1952)
1950	Arkansas	2–8	1–5	7th	
1951	Arkansas	5–5	2–4	6th	
1952	Arkansas	2–8	1–5	7th	
Arkansas:		9–21	4–14		
Total:		17–34–4			
