= 1950 North Dakota Fighting Sioux football team =

American college football season

1950 North Dakota Fighting Sioux football
- Conference: North Central Conference
- Record: 5–2–2 (3–2–1 NCC)
- Head coach: Frank Zazula (1st season)
- Home stadium: Memorial Stadium

1950 North Central Conference football standings
	Conf.					Overall
Team	W		L		T	W		L		T
South Dakota State $	5	–	0	–	1	9	–	0	–	1
Iowa State Teachers	4	–	2	–	0	4	–	4	–	0
North Dakota	3	–	1	–	2	5	–	2	–	2
Morningside	3	–	2	–	1	6	–	2	–	1
South Dakota	3	–	3	–	0	4	–	5	–	0
Augustana (SD)	1	–	5	–	0	2	–	7	–	0
North Dakota State	0	–	6	–	0	2	–	7	–	0
$ – Conference champion

The 1950 North Dakota Fighting Sioux football team, also known as the Nodaks, was an American football team that represented the University of North Dakota in the North Central Conference (NCC) during the 1950 college football season. In its first year under head coach Frank Zazula, the team compiled a 5–2–2 record (3–2–1 against NCC opponents), finished in third place out of seven teams in the NCC, and outscored opponents by a total of 222 to 170. The team played its home games at Memorial Stadium in Grand Forks, North Dakota.

== Schedule ==
Date	Opponent	Site	Result	Attendance	Source
September 16	Moorhead State*	Memorial Stadium; Grand Forks, ND	W 53–0		
September 22	Iowa State Teachers	Memorial Stadium; Grand Forks, ND	L 21–33		
September 30	at Morningside	Sioux City, IA	T 13–13		
October 6	Bemidji State*	Memorial Stadium; Grand Forks, ND	W 26–6		
October 14	South Dakota	Memorial Stadium; Grand Forks, ND	W 28–7		
October 21	at South Dakota State	Brookings, SD (Hobo Day)	T 21–21	9,000–9,500	
October 28	North Dakota State	Memorial Stadium; Grand Forks, ND	W 33–0		
November 4	at Augustana (SD)	Sioux Falls, SD	W 27–7		
November 19	at Kentucky*	McLean Stadium; Lexington, KY	L 0–83	20,000	
*Non-conference game
