= 1950 North Dakota State Bison football team =

American college football season

1950 North Dakota State Bison football
- Conference: North Central Conference
- Record: 2–7 (0–6 NCC)
- Head coach: Mac Wenskunas (1st season)
- Home stadium: Dacotah Field

1950 North Central Conference football standings
	Conf.					Overall
Team	W		L		T	W		L		T
South Dakota State $	5	–	0	–	1	9	–	0	–	1
Iowa State Teachers	4	–	2	–	0	4	–	4	–	0
North Dakota	3	–	1	–	2	5	–	2	–	2
Morningside	3	–	2	–	1	6	–	2	–	1
South Dakota	3	–	3	–	0	4	–	5	–	0
Augustana (SD)	1	–	5	–	0	2	–	7	–	0
North Dakota State	0	–	6	–	0	2	–	7	–	0
$ – Conference champion

The 1950 North Dakota State Bison football team was an American football team that represented North Dakota State University during the 1950 college football season as a member of the North Central Conference. In their first year under head coach Mac Wenskunas, the team compiled a 2–7 record.

== Schedule ==
Date	Opponent	Site	Result	Attendance	Source
September 16	Augustana (SD)	Dacotah Field; Fargo, ND	L 0–6		
September 23	at Marquette*	Marquette Stadium; Milwaukee, WI	L 0–57		
September 30	at Iowa State Teachers	O. R. Latham Stadium; Cedar Falls, IA	L 25–33	3,500	
October 6	Morningside	Dacotah Field; Fargo, ND	L 7–13		
October 14	South Dakota State^{†}	Dacotah Field; Fargo, ND (rivalry)	L 0–60		
October 20	Moorhead State*	Dacotah Field; Fargo, ND	W 30–7		
October 28	at North Dakota	Memorial Stadium; Grand Forks, ND (Nickel Trophy)	L 0–33		
November 4	vs. Montana State*	Glendive, MT	W 27–0		
November 11	at South Dakota	Inman Field; Vermillion, SD	L 7–31	1,800	
*Non-conference game; ^{†}Homecoming
