= 1950 Texas Tech Red Raiders football team =

American college football season

1950 Texas Tech Red Raiders football
- Conference: Border Conference
- Record: 3–8 (3–2 Border)
- Head coach: Dell Morgan (10th season)
- Offensive scheme: Single-wing
- Base defense: 6–2
- Home stadium: Jones Stadium

1950 Border Conference football standings
	Conf.					Overall
Team	W		L		T	W		L		T
West Texas State $	6	–	0	–	0	10	–	1	–	0
Arizona State	4	–	1	–	0	9	–	2	–	0
Texas Western	4	–	2	–	0	7	–	3	–	0
Texas Tech	3	–	2	–	0	3	–	8	–	0
Hardin–Simmons	3	–	3	–	0	5	–	5	–	0
Arizona	2	–	4	–	0	4	–	6	–	0
New Mexico	2	–	5	–	0	2	–	8	–	0
New Mexico A&M	1	–	4	–	0	2	–	7	–	0
Arizona State–Flagstaff	0	–	4	–	0	2	–	7	–	0
$ – Conference champion

The 1950 Texas Tech Red Raiders football team represented Texas Technological College—now known as Texas Tech University—as a member of the Border Conference during the 1950 college football season. Led by Dell Morgan in his tenth and final season as head coach, the Red Raiders compiled an overall record of 3–8 with a mark of 3–2 in conference play, placing fourth in the Border Conference.

== Schedule ==
Date	Opponent	Site	Result	Attendance	Source
September 23	No. 5 Texas	Jones Stadium; Lubbock, TX (rivalry)	L 14–28	19,500	
September 30	vs. Texas A&M*	Alamo Stadium; San Antonio, TX (rivalry)	L 13–34	22,000–24,000	
October 7	West Texas State	Jones Stadium; Lubbock, TX	L 13–28	17,000	
October 14	at TCU*	Amon G. Carter Stadium; Fort Worth, TX (rivalry)	L 6–19	12,000	
October 21	at Baylor*	Baylor Stadium; Waco, TX (rivalry)	L 12–26	12,000	
October 28	Texas Western	Jones Stadium; Lubbock, TX	W 61–7	13,000	
November 4	at Rice*	Rice Stadium; Houston, TX	L 7–13	20,000	
November 11	Tulsa*^{†}	Jones Stadium; Lubbock, TX	L 7–39	18,000	
November 18	at Arizona	Arizona Stadium; Tucson, AZ	W 39–7	15,500	
November 25	New Mexico	Jones Stadium; Lubbock, TX	W 37–12	7,000	
December 2	at Hardin–Simmons	Fair Park Stadium; Abilene, TX	L 13–28	9,000	
*Non-conference game; ^{†}Homecoming; Rankings from AP Poll released prior to the game
