= 1950 Hardin–Simmons Cowboys football team =

American college football season

1950 Hardin–Simmons Cowboys football
- Conference: Border Conference
- Record: 5–5 (3–3 Border)
- Head coach: Warren B. Woodson (7th season)

1950 Border Conference football standings
	Conf.					Overall
Team	W		L		T	W		L		T
West Texas State $	6	–	0	–	0	10	–	1	–	0
Arizona State	4	–	1	–	0	9	–	2	–	0
Texas Western	4	–	2	–	0	7	–	3	–	0
Texas Tech	3	–	2	–	0	3	–	8	–	0
Hardin–Simmons	3	–	3	–	0	5	–	5	–	0
Arizona	2	–	4	–	0	4	–	6	–	0
New Mexico	2	–	5	–	0	2	–	8	–	0
New Mexico A&M	1	–	4	–	0	2	–	7	–	0
Arizona State–Flagstaff	0	–	4	–	0	2	–	7	–	0
$ – Conference champion

The 1950 Hardin–Simmons Cowboys football team was an American football team that represented Hardin–Simmons University in the Border Conference during the 1950 college football season. In its seventh season under head coach Warren B. Woodson, the team compiled a 5–5 record (3–3 against conference opponents), finished fifth in the conference, and outscored opponents by a total of 278 to 180.

Only one Hardin-Simmons player was named to the 1950 All-Border Conference football team: quarterback John Ford. Ford was also selected by the Associated Press as a second-team player on the 1950 Little All-America college football team.

== Schedule ==
Date	Opponent	Site	Result	Attendance	Source
September 16	at New Mexico A&M	Memorial Stadium; Las Cruces, NM	W 48–0		
September 23	at Cincinnati*	Nippert Stadium; Cincinnati, OH	L 7–19	23,000	
September 30	Trinity (TX)*	Parramore Stadium; Abilene, TX	W 41–0		
October 7	at Arizona	Arizona Stadium; Tucson, AZ	L 28–32	17,500	
October 14	Arizona State	Parramore Stadium; Abilene, TX	W 41–14		
October 20	Houston*	Parramore Stadium; Abilene, TX	W 14–13		
November 3	at Loyola (CA)*	Gilmore Stadium; Los Angeles, CA	L 20–21	18,500	
November 11	at Texas Western	Kidd Field; El Paso, TX	L 20–21	10,000	
November 18	West Texas State	Parramore Stadium; Abilene, TX	L 31–47	7,400	
December 2	Texas Tech	Fair Park Stadium; Abilene, TX	W 28–13		
*Non-conference game
