= 1950 Tulsa Golden Hurricane football team =

American college football season

1950 Tulsa Golden Hurricane football

MVC champion
- Conference: Missouri Valley Conference

Ranking
- AP: No. 19
- Record: 9–1–1 (3–0–1 MVC)
- Head coach: Buddy Brothers (5th season)
- Home stadium: Skelly Field

1950 Missouri Valley Conference football standings
	Conf.					Overall
Team	W		L		T	W		L		T
No. 19 Tulsa $	3	–	0	–	1	9	–	1	–	1
Detroit	2	–	1	–	1	6	–	3	–	1
Wichita	3	–	2	–	0	5	–	4	–	1
Drake	1	–	2	–	1	6	–	2	–	1
Oklahoma A&M	1	–	2	–	1	4	–	6	–	1
Bradley	0	–	3	–	0	5	–	5	–	0
$ – Conference champion; Rankings from AP Poll

The 1950 Tulsa Golden Hurricane football team represented the University of Tulsa during the 1950 college football season. In their fifth year under head coach Buddy Brothers, the Golden Hurricane compiled a 9–1–1 record (3–0–1 against Missouri Valley Conference opponents) and was ranked No. 19 in the final AP Poll. The team won victories over Oklahoma A&M (27-13), Texas Tech (39-7), Arkansas (28-13), and Houston (28-21), lost to the San Francisco Dons (14-23), and tied Detroit (13-13). The team ranked third in major college football in total offense, tallying an average of 431.5 yards per game.

The team ranke third nationally in total offense (431.5 yards per game), third in passing defense (70.0 yards per game), and fifth in rushing offense (307.6 yards per game).

== Schedule ==
Date	Time	Opponent	Site	Result	Attendance	Source
September 16		McMurry*	Skelly Field; Tulsa, OK	W 20–13	15,000	
September 23		at San Francisco*	Kezar Stadium; San Francisco, CA	L 14–23	15,015	
October 7		at Georgetown*	Griffith Stadium; Washington, DC	W 21–7	4,341	
October 14		Villanova*	Skelly Field; Tulsa, OK	W 27–7	17,500	
October 21		Detroit^{†}	Skelly Field; Tulsa, OK	T 13–13	12,356	
October 28	8:00 p.m.	at Bradley	Peoria Stadium; Peoria, IL	W 74–6	4,500	
November 4		Oklahoma A&M	Skelly Field; Tulsa, OK (rivalry)	W 27–13	15,350	
November 11		at Texas Tech*	Jones Stadium; Lubbock, TX	W 39–7	18,000	
November 18		Wichita	Skelly Field; Tulsa, OK	W 48–0	11,531	
November 23		Arkansas*	Skelly Field; Tulsa, OK	W 28–13	19,500	
December 2		at Houston*	Rice Stadium; Houston, TX	W 28–21	10,000	
*Non-conference game; ^{†}Homecoming; All times are in Central time

== After the season ==
=== 1951 NFL draft ===
The following Golden Hurricane players were selected in the 1951 NFL draft following the season.

Round	Pick	Player	Position	NFL club
20	243	Jack Crocker	Back	Cleveland Browns
22	259	S. J. Whitman	Defensive back	Chicago Cardinals
29	345	Fred Smith	End	Pittsburgh Steelers
