= 1950 Baylor Bears football team =

American college football season

1950 Baylor Bears football
- Conference: Southwest Conference

Ranking
- Coaches: No. 15 (tie)
- Record: 7–3 (4–2 SWC)
- Head coach: George Sauer (1st season)
- Captain: Frank Boydstun
- Home stadium: Baylor Stadium

1950 Southwest Conference football standings
	Conf.					Overall
Team	W		L		T	W		L		T
No. 3 Texas $	6	–	0	–	0	9	–	2	–	0
Baylor	4	–	2	–	0	7	–	3	–	0
Texas A&M	3	–	3	–	0	7	–	4	–	0
TCU	3	–	3	–	0	5	–	5	–	0
Rice	2	–	4	–	0	6	–	4	–	0
SMU	2	–	4	–	0	6	–	4	–	0
Arkansas	1	–	5	–	0	2	–	8	–	0
$ – Conference champion; Rankings from AP Poll

The 1950 Baylor Bears football team represented Baylor University in the 1950 college football season. The Bears placed second in the Southwest Conference with an overall record of 7–3. Two players - Larry Isbell (Back) and Harold Riley (End) - were selected as All-Southwest Conference players. The 1950 season was the inaugural season for Baylor University's new state of the art 50,000 seat Baylor Stadium.

== Schedule ==
Date	Opponent	Site	Result	Attendance	Source
September 23	at Wyoming*	War Memorial Stadium; Laramie, WY	L 0–7	17,268	
September 30	Houston*	Baylor Stadium; Waco, TX (rivalry)	W 34–7	24,500–25,000	
October 7	vs. Mississippi State*	State Fair Stadium; Shreveport, LA	W 14–7	20,000	
October 14	at Arkansas	Razorback Stadium; Fayetteville, AR	L 6–27	17,000	
October 21	Texas Tech*	Baylor Stadium; Waco, TX (rivalry)	W 26–12	12,000	
October 28	No. 13 Texas A&M^{†}	Baylor Stadium; Waco, TX (rivalry)	W 27–20	37,000	
November 4	at TCU	Amon G. Carter Stadium; Fort Worth, TX (rivalry)	W 20–14	20,000	
November 11	No. 5 Texas	Baylor Stadium; Waco, TX (rivalry)	L 20–27	35,000	
November 25	at No. 15 SMU	Cotton Bowl; Dallas, TX	W 3–0	50,000	
December 2	Rice	Baylor Stadium; Waco, TX	W 33–7	20,000	
*Non-conference game; ^{†}Homecoming; Rankings from AP Poll released prior to the game
