= 1950 Drake Bulldogs football team =

American college football season

1950 Drake Bulldogs football
- Conference: Missouri Valley Conference
- Record: 6–2–1 (1–2–1 MVC)
- Head coach: Warren Gaer (2nd season)
- Home stadium: Drake Stadium

1950 Missouri Valley Conference football standings
	Conf.					Overall
Team	W		L		T	W		L		T
No. 19 Tulsa $	3	–	0	–	1	9	–	1	–	1
Detroit	2	–	1	–	1	6	–	3	–	1
Wichita	3	–	2	–	0	5	–	4	–	1
Drake	1	–	2	–	1	6	–	2	–	1
Oklahoma A&M	1	–	2	–	1	4	–	6	–	1
Bradley	0	–	3	–	0	5	–	5	–	0
$ – Conference champion; Rankings from AP Poll

The 1950 Drake Bulldogs football team was an American football team that represented Drake University as a member of the Missouri Valley Conference during the 1950 college football season. In its second season under head coach Warren Gaer, the team compiled a 6–2–1 record (1–2–1 against MVC opponents), tied for fourth place in the conference, and outscored opponents by a total of 247 to 117. The team played its home games at Drake Stadium in Des Moines, Iowa.

Drake halfback Johnny Bright led the nation in total offense in both 1949 and 1950. See List of NCAA major college football yearly total offense leaders. He was the second African-American athlete to lead the country in this category after Kenny Washington did so in 1939. Bright later played 11 seasons in the Canadian Football League and was inducted into both the College Football Hall of Fame and the Canadian Football Hall of Fame.

== Schedule ==
Date	Time	Opponent	Site	Result	Attendance	Source
September 16		Denver*	Drake Stadium; Des Moines, IA	W 7–0	8,000	
September 23		at Kansas State Teachers*	Francis G. Welch Stadium; Emporia, KS	W 47–6		
September 30		at South Dakota*	Darwin Inman Memorial Stadium; Vermillion, SD	W 41–13		
October 7		Oklahoma A&M	Drake Stadium; Des Moines, IA	T 14–14		
October 14		at Iowa State Teachers*	O. R. Latham Stadium; Cedar Falls, IA (rivalry)	W 34–18		
October 21		Wichita	Drake Stadium; Des Moines, IA	L 14–17		
October 27		at Detroit	University of Detroit Stadium; Detroit, MI	L 13–14	6,255	
November 4	1:30 p.m.	Bradley^{†}	Drake Stadium; Des Moines, IA	W 42–14	7,500	
November 11	2:00 p.m.	at Iowa State*	Clyde Williams Field; Ames, IA	W 35–21	15,519	
*Non-conference game; ^{†}Homecoming; All times are in Central time
