= 1950 Arizona Wildcats football team =

American college football season

1950 Arizona Wildcats football
- Conference: Border Conference
- Record: 4–6 (2–4 Border)
- Head coach: Bob Winslow (2nd season)
- Captain: Eddie Wolgast
- Home stadium: Arizona Stadium

1950 Border Conference football standings
	Conf.					Overall
Team	W		L		T	W		L		T
West Texas State $	6	–	0	–	0	10	–	1	–	0
Arizona State	4	–	1	–	0	9	–	2	–	0
Texas Western	4	–	2	–	0	7	–	3	–	0
Texas Tech	3	–	2	–	0	3	–	8	–	0
Hardin–Simmons	3	–	3	–	0	5	–	5	–	0
Arizona	2	–	4	–	0	4	–	6	–	0
New Mexico	2	–	5	–	0	2	–	8	–	0
New Mexico A&M	1	–	4	–	0	2	–	7	–	0
Arizona State–Flagstaff	0	–	4	–	0	2	–	7	–	0
$ – Conference champion

The 1950 Arizona Wildcats football team represented the University of Arizona in the Border Conference during the 1950 college football season. In their second season under head coach Bob Winslow, the Wildcats compiled a 4–6 record (2–4 against Border opponents) and were outscored by their opponents, 257 to 214. The team captain was Eddie Wolgast. The team played its home games in Arizona Stadium in Tucson, Arizona.

== Schedule ==
Date	Opponent	Site	Result	Attendance	Source
September 23	West Texas State	Arizona Stadium; Tucson, AZ	L 26–34	18,000	
September 30	at Utah*	Ute Stadium; Salt Lake City, UT	L 14–27		
October 7	Hardin–Simmons	Arizona Stadium; Tucson, AZ	W 32–28	17,500	
October 14	at Texas Western	Kidd Field; El Paso, TX	L 13–14	12,000	
October 21	at Colorado*	Folsom Field; Boulder, CO	L 25–28	11,600–14,000	
October 28	Denver*	Arizona Stadium; Tucson, AZ	W 19–14	18,000	
November 4	at New Mexico	Zimmerman Field; Albuquerque, NM (rivalry)	W 38–0	11,000	
November 11	Arizona State	Arizona Stadium; Tucson, AZ (rivalry)	L 13–47	26,500	
November 18	Texas Tech	Arizona Stadium; Tucson, AZ	L 7–39	15,500	
November 25	Iowa State*	Arizona Stadium; Tucson, AZ	W 27–26	13,868	
*Non-conference game
