= 1950 Wichita Shockers football team =

American college football season

1950 Wichita Shockers football
- Conference: Missouri Valley Conference
- Record: 5–4–1 (3–2 MVC)
- Head coach: Jim Trimble (3rd season)
- Home stadium: Veterans Field

1950 Missouri Valley Conference football standings
	Conf.					Overall
Team	W		L		T	W		L		T
No. 19 Tulsa $	3	–	0	–	1	9	–	1	–	1
Detroit	2	–	1	–	1	6	–	3	–	1
Wichita	3	–	2	–	0	5	–	4	–	1
Drake	1	–	2	–	1	6	–	2	–	1
Oklahoma A&M	1	–	2	–	1	4	–	6	–	1
Bradley	0	–	3	–	0	5	–	5	–	0
$ – Conference champion; Rankings from AP Poll

The 1950 Wichita Shockers football team, sometimes known as the Wheatshockers, was an American football team that represented Wichita University (now known as Wichita State University) as a member of the Missouri Valley Conference during the 1950 college football season. In its third season under head coach Jim Trimble, the team compiled a 5–4–1 record (3–2 against conference opponents), finished third out of six teams in the MVC, and was outscored by a total of 243 to 203. The team played its home games at Veterans Field, now known as Cessna Stadium.

== Schedule ==
Date	Time	Opponent	Site	Result	Attendance	Source
September 30		Utah State*	Veterans Field; Wichita, KS	W 49–20	8,457	
October 6		at Detroit	University of Detroit Stadium; Detroit, MI	W 21–13		
October 14	2:00 p.m.	Bradley	Veterans Field; Wichita, KS	W 34–6	12,006	
October 21		at Drake	Drake Stadium; Des Moines, IA	W 17–14		
October 28		Houston*	Veterans Field; Wichita, KS	L 6–46	10,000	
November 4		at Miami (OH)*	Miami Field; Oxford, OH	L 13–39	11,000	
November 11		Oklahoma A&M	Veterans Field; Wichita, KS	L 20–32		
November 18		at Tulsa	Skelly Field; Tulsa, OK	L 0–48	11,531	
November 23		Nevada*	Veterans Field; Wichita, KS	W 37–19		
December 2		Kansas State*	Veterans Field; Wichita, KS	T 6–6		
*Non-conference game; All times are in Central time
