= 1950 West Texas State Buffaloes football team =

American college football season

1950 West Texas State Buffaloes football

Border champion Sun Bowl champion

Sun Bowl, W 14–13 vs. Cincinnati
- Conference: Border Conference
- Record: 10–1 (6–0 Border)
- Head coach: Frank Kimbrough (4th season)
- Home stadium: Amarillo Stadium, Buffalo Stadium

1950 Border Conference football standings
	Conf.					Overall
Team	W		L		T	W		L		T
West Texas State $	6	–	0	–	0	10	–	1	–	0
Arizona State	4	–	1	–	0	9	–	2	–	0
Texas Western	4	–	2	–	0	7	–	3	–	0
Texas Tech	3	–	2	–	0	3	–	8	–	0
Hardin–Simmons	3	–	3	–	0	5	–	5	–	0
Arizona	2	–	4	–	0	4	–	6	–	0
New Mexico	2	–	5	–	0	2	–	8	–	0
New Mexico A&M	1	–	4	–	0	2	–	7	–	0
Arizona State–Flagstaff	0	–	4	–	0	2	–	7	–	0
$ – Conference champion

The 1950 West Texas State Buffaloes football team was an American football team that represented West Texas State College (now known as West Texas A&M University) in the Border Conference during the 1950 college football season. In its fourth season under head coach Frank Kimbrough, the team compiled a 10–1 record (6–0 against conference opponents), won the conference championship, defeated Cincinnati in the 1951 Sun Bowl, and outscored all opponents by a total of 386 to 190.

The team averaged 35.1 points per game. The team also averaged 322.9 rushing yards per game, a figure that remains a program record.

The team was led on offense by a trio of quarterback Gene Mayfield and backs Billy Cross and Charles Wright. Mayfield was named to the Associated Press Little All-America team. Cross's 1950 average of 9.21 rushing yards per carry also remains a program record. Wright set a school record (later broken) with 1,203 rushing yards.

== Schedule ==
Date	Opponent	Site	Result	Attendance	Source
September 16	Arizona State–Flagstaff	Buffalo Stadium; Canyon, TX	W 52–12		
September 23	at Arizona	Arizona Stadium; Tucson, AZ	W 34–26	18,000	
September 30	McMurry*	Buffalo Stadium; Canyon, TX	W 41–19		
October 7	at Texas Tech	Jones Stadium; Lubbock, TX	W 28–13	17,000	
October 14	New Mexico	Amarillo Stadium; Amarillo, TX	W 45–6	12,000	
October 21	Sam Houston State*^{†}	Buffalo Stadium; Canyon, TX	W 45–6		
October 28	at Trinity (TX)*	Alamo Stadium; San Antonio, TX	L 20–27		
November 4	at Texas Western	Kidd Field; El Paso, TX	W 40–12		
November 18	at Hardin–Simmons	Parramore Stadium; Abilene, TX	W 47–13	7,400	
November 25	at Corpus Christi*	Buccaneer Stadium; Corpus Christi, TX	W 26–13	600	
January 1, 1951	vs. Cincinnati*	Kidd Field; El Paso, TX (Sun Bowl)	W 14–13	15,000	
*Non-conference game; ^{†}Homecoming
