= Vaughn Corley =

American football player and coach (1907–1977)

Biographical details
- Born: November 2, 1907; Hill County, Texas, U.S.
- Died: November 18, 1977 (aged 70); Las Cruces, New Mexico, U.S.

Playing career
- 1926–1928: Texas Tech

Coaching career (HC unless noted)
- 1929–1932: Las Cruces HS (NM)
- 1933–1938: New Mexico A&M (line)
- 1939–1942: Oregon (line)
- c. 1943: Saint Mary's Pre-Flight (line)
- 1945–1946: Oregon (line)
- 1947: Arizona (line)
- 1948–1950: New Mexico A&M

Administrative career (AD unless noted)
- 1949–1951: New Mexico A&M

Head coaching record
- Overall: 9–20 (college)

Vaughn D. Corley (November 2, 1907 – November 18, 1977) was an American football coach. He served as the head football coach at New Mexico College of Agriculture and Mechanic Arts—now known as New Mexico State University—from 1948 to 1950, compiling a record of 9–20. Corley played football and ran track at Texas Technological College—now known as Texas Tech University. He began his coaching career in 1929 at Las Cruces High School in Las Cruces, New Mexico. Corley moved to New Mexico A&M as an assistant football coach in 1933 and coached the linemen there under head coach Jerry Hines until 1938. He coached the line at the University of Oregon, from 1939 to 1942 and again from 1945 to 1946, and at the University of Arizona in 1947 before returning to Mexico A&M as head coach in 1948. Corley also coached at the Saint Mary's Pre-Flight School during World War II.

Corley died on November 18, 1977, at a hospital in Las Cruces.

== Head coaching record ==
=== College ===
Year	Team	Overall	Conference	Standing	Bowl/playoffs
New Mexico A&M Aggies (Border Conference) (1948–1950)
1948	New Mexico A&M	3–7	0–4	9th	
1949	New Mexico A&M	4–6	1–4	7th	
1950	New Mexico A&M	2–7	1–4	8th	
New Mexico A&M:		9–20	2–12		
Total:		9–20			
