= Ben Reiges =

American football player and coach (1920–2020)

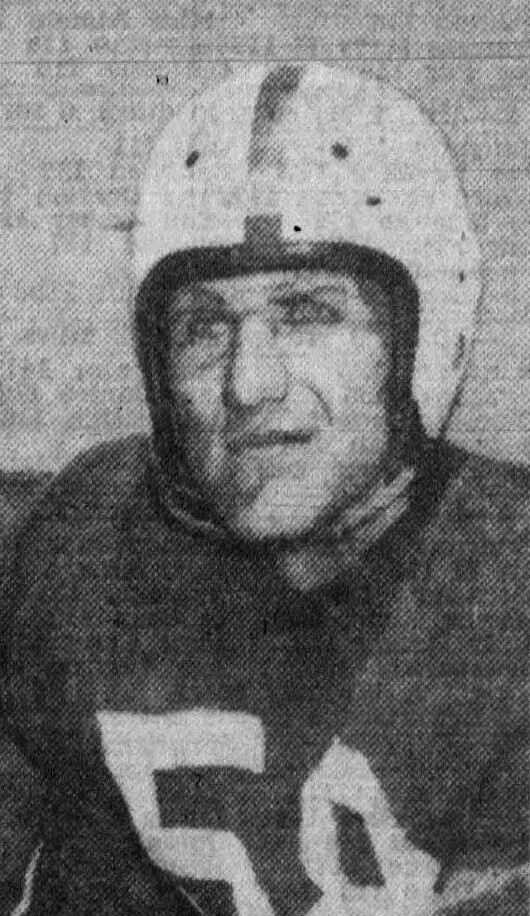
- Reiges, circa 1947

Biographical details
- Born: March 4, 1920; Worcester, Massachusetts, U.S.
- Died: October 22, 2020 (aged 100)

Playing career
- 1940–1941: Georgetown
- 1946–1947: UCLA
- 1947–1948: Los Angeles Bulldogs
- Position: Quarterback

Coaching career (HC unless noted)
- 1950: Arizona State–Flagstaff

Head coaching record
- Overall: 2–7

Bennie John Reiges (March 4, 1920 – October 22, 2020) was an American football player and coach. He served as the head football coach at Arizona State Teachers College at Flagstaff—now known as Northern Arizona University—in 1950, compiling a record of 2–7. Reiges played college football as a quarterback at the University of California, Los Angeles (UCLA) during the 1946 and 1947 seasons. He was selected by the Los Angeles Rams in the 1947 NFL draft. He died in October 2020 at the age of 100.

== Head coaching record ==
Year	Team	Overall	Conference	Standing	Bowl/playoffs
Arizona State Flagstaff–Lumberjacks (Border Conference) (1950)
1950	Arizona State–Flagstaff	2–7	0–4	9th	
Arizona State–Flagstaff:		2–7	0–4		
Total:		2–7			
