= 1950 New Mexico A&M Aggies football team =

American college football season

1950 New Mexico A&M Aggies football
- Conference: Border Conference
- Record: 2–7 (1–4 Border)
- Head coach: Vaughn Corley (3rd season)
- Home stadium: Memorial Stadium

1950 Border Conference football standings
	Conf.					Overall
Team	W		L		T	W		L		T
West Texas State $	6	–	0	–	0	10	–	1	–	0
Arizona State	4	–	1	–	0	9	–	2	–	0
Texas Western	4	–	2	–	0	7	–	3	–	0
Texas Tech	3	–	2	–	0	3	–	8	–	0
Hardin–Simmons	3	–	3	–	0	5	–	5	–	0
Arizona	2	–	4	–	0	4	–	6	–	0
New Mexico	2	–	5	–	0	2	–	8	–	0
New Mexico A&M	1	–	4	–	0	2	–	7	–	0
Arizona State–Flagstaff	0	–	4	–	0	2	–	7	–	0
$ – Conference champion

The 1950 New Mexico A&M Aggies football team was an American football team that represented New Mexico College of Agriculture and Mechanical Arts (now known as New Mexico State University) as a member of the Border Conference during the 1950 college football season. In their third and final year under head coach Vaughn Corley, the Aggies compiled a 2–7 record (1–4 against conference opponents), finished eighth in the conference, and were outscored by a total of 249 to 95. The team played home games at Memorial Stadium in Las Cruces, New Mexico.

== Schedule ==
Date	Opponent	Site	Result	Attendance	Source
September 16	Hardin–Simmons	Memorial Stadium; Las Cruces, NM	L 0–48		
September 23	at Texas Western	Kidd Field; El Paso, TX (rivalry)	L 0–40	7,000	
September 29	Howard Payne*	Memorial Stadium; Las Cruces, NM	L 6–33		
October 7	at New Mexico	Zimmerman Field; Albuquerque, NM (rivalry)	L 13–26		
October 14	at Arizona State–Flagstaff	Skidmore Field; Flagstaff, AZ	W 20–14		
October 21	New Mexico Military*	Memorial Stadium; Las Cruces, NM	W 27–7		
October 28	at Arizona State	Goodwin Stadium; Tempe, AZ	L 0–49		
November 11	Southwestern Oklahoma State*	Memorial Stadium; Las Cruces, NM	L 16–18		
November 18	Colorado Mines*^{†}	Memorial Stadium; Las Cruces, NM	L 13–14		
*Non-conference game; ^{†}Homecoming
