= Frank Kimbrough (American football) =

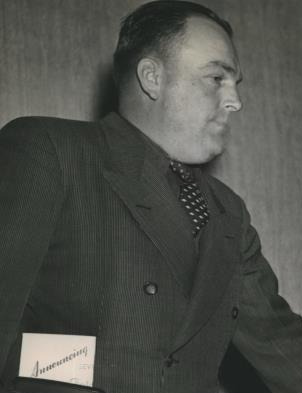
- Kimbrough in 1942

Biographical details
- Born: June 24, 1904; Alabama, U.S.
- Died: February 4, 1971 (aged 66); Canyon, Texas, U.S.

Playing career

Football
- 1922–1925: Simmons (TX)

Coaching career (HC unless noted)

Football
- 1935–1940: Hardin–Simmons
- 1941–1942: Baylor
- 1943: North Carolina Pre-Flight
- 1945–1946: Baylor
- 1947–1957: West Texas State

Basketball
- 1936–1941: Hardin–Simmons

Administrative career (AD unless noted)
- 1957–1969: West Texas State

Head coaching record
- Overall: 118–87–9 (football); 29–50 (basketball)
- Bowls: 3–0–1

Accomplishments and honors

Championships
- Football; 1 Border (1950)

Francis Henry Kimbrough (June 24, 1904 – February 4, 1971) was an American football player, coach of football and basketball, and college athletics administrator. He served as the head football coach at Hardin–Simmons University (1935–1940), Baylor University (1941–1942, 1945–1946), and West Texas State University—now West Texas A&M University (1947–1957). Kimbrough was also the head basketball coach at Hardin–Simmons from 1936 to 1941, tallying a mark of 29–50. He was the brother of Texas A&M star football player John Kimbrough.

Kimbrough began his college coaching career at Hardin–Simmons in 1935. After finishing the 1940 season with a perfect 9–0 record, Kimbrough—at age 37—was hired by Baylor, replacing Morley Jennings. With mediocre results in his first three seasons, Kimbrough resigned after Baylor went 1–8 in 1946. In the middle of his Baylor tenure, Kimbrough served as the head coach for the North Carolina Pre-Flight School team in 1943 and led the Cloudbusters to an overall record of 2–4–1. He was immediately hired by West Texas A&M, where he coached the following 11 years. In 1950 his team went 10–1, including a Sun Bowl win over Cincinnati. Kimbrough retired in 1957 to become the school's athletic director. Kimbrough Memorial Stadium in Canyon, Texas, West Texas A&M's football field, is named in his honor.

== Head coaching record ==
=== Football ===
Year	Team	Overall	Conference	Standing	Bowl/playoffs	AP^{#}
Hardin–Simmons Cowboys (Texas Conference) (1935)
1935	Hardin–Simmons	6–3–1	2–0	NA	T Sun	
Hardin–Simmons Cowboys (Independent) (1936–1940)
1936	Hardin–Simmons	9–2			W Sun	
1937	Hardin–Simmons	8–0–1				
1938	Hardin–Simmons	8–2				
1939	Hardin–Simmons	7–1–1				
1940	Hardin–Simmons	9–0				17
Hardin–Simmons:		47–8–3	2–0			
Baylor Bears (Southwest Conference) (1941–1942)
1941	Baylor	3–6–1	1–4–1	6th		
1942	Baylor	6–4–1	3–2–1	4th		
North Carolina Pre-Flight Cloudbusters (Independent) (1943)
1943	North Carolina Pre-Flight	2–4–1				
North Carolina Pre-Flight:		2–4–1				
Baylor Bears (Southwest Conference) (1945–1946)
1945	Baylor	5–5–1	2–4	6th		
1946	Baylor	1–8	0–6	7th		
Baylor:		15–23–3	6–16–2			
West Texas State Buffaloes (Border Conference) (1947–1957)
1947	West Texas State	7–4	5–2	3rd		
1948	West Texas State	6–5	2–3	6th		
1949	West Texas State	5–4	3–2	5th		
1950	West Texas State	10–1	6–0	1st	W Sun	
1951	West Texas State	2–7	1–5	7th		
1952	West Texas State	3–6	1–4	7th		
1953	West Texas State	1–8–1	0–6	7th		
1954	West Texas State	1–8	1–5	7th		
1955	West Texas State	4–4–1	1–4–1	6th		
1956	West Texas State	8–2	2–2	3rd	W Tangerine	
1957	West Texas State	7–3	3–1	2nd		
West Texas State:		54–52–2	25–34–1			
Total:		118–87–9				
National championship Conference title Conference division title or championship game berth
