= 1950 New Mexico Lobos football team =

American college football season

1950 New Mexico Lobos football
- Conference: Border Conference
- Record: 2–8 (2–5 Border)
- Head coach: Dudley DeGroot (1st season)
- Home stadium: Zimmerman Field

1950 Border Conference football standings
	Conf.					Overall
Team	W		L		T	W		L		T
West Texas State $	6	–	0	–	0	10	–	1	–	0
Arizona State	4	–	1	–	0	9	–	2	–	0
Texas Western	4	–	2	–	0	7	–	3	–	0
Texas Tech	3	–	2	–	0	3	–	8	–	0
Hardin–Simmons	3	–	3	–	0	5	–	5	–	0
Arizona	2	–	4	–	0	4	–	6	–	0
New Mexico	2	–	5	–	0	2	–	8	–	0
New Mexico A&M	1	–	4	–	0	2	–	7	–	0
Arizona State–Flagstaff	0	–	4	–	0	2	–	7	–	0
$ – Conference champion

The 1950 New Mexico Lobos football team represented the University of New Mexico in the Border Conference during the 1950 college football season. In their first season under head coach Dudley DeGroot, the Lobos compiled a 2–8 record (2–5 against conference opponents), finished seventh in the conference, and were outscored by opponents by a total of 330 to 160. On defense, the team allowed an average of 33 points per game, ranking 116th of 120 major college teams.

== Schedule ==
Date	Time	Opponent	Site	Result	Attendance	Source
September 23		Arizona State–Flagstaff	Zimmerman Field; Albuquerque, NM	W 78–0	12,000	
September 30		at Arizona State	Goodwin Stadium; Tempe, AZ	L 6–41		
October 7		New Mexico A&M	Zimmerman Field; Albuquerque, NM (rivalry)	W 26–13		
October 14		at West Texas State	Amarillo Stadium; Amarillo, TX	L 6–45	12,000	
October 21		Texas Western	Zimmerman Field; Albuquerque, NM	L 13–41		
October 28		at Wyoming*	War Memorial Stadium; Laramie, WY	L 0–44		
November 4		Arizona^{†}	Zimmerman Field; Albuquerque, NM (rivalry)	L 0–38	11,000	
November 11		at No. 1 Army*	Michie Stadium; West Point, NY	L 0–51	30,476	
November 18	2:00 p.m.	Bradley*	Zimmerman Field; Albuquerque, NM	L 19–20	9,000	
November 25		at Texas Tech	Jones Stadium; Lubbock, TX	L 12–37	7,000	
*Non-conference game; ^{†}Homecoming; Rankings from AP Poll released prior to the game; All times are in Mountain time
