= 1951 Sun Bowl =

American college football game

West Texas State Buffaloes	Cincinnati Bearcats
(9–1)	(8–3)
Border Conference	MAC
14	13
Head coach: Frank Kimbrough	Head coach: Sid Gillman
	1	2	3	4	Total
West Texas State	0	7	7	0	14
Cincinnati	0	6	7	0	13
- Date: January 1, 1951
- Season: 1950
- Stadium: Kidd Field
- Location: El Paso, Texas
- Attendance: 16,000

The 1951 Sun Bowl was a college football bowl game that took place in El Paso, Texas, on January 1, 1951, between the West Texas State Buffaloes and the University of Cincinnati Bearcats. This was the 17th Sun Bowl (16th between collegiate teams) that had been played in El Paso, the second-oldest bowl game, the only older being the Rose Bowl.

== Scoring summary ==
Gene Rossi threw 14-of-29 for 170 yards. The winning touchdown occurred on a fourth down punt. Punter Frank Wise moved under center and took the snap, lateraling to the right to quarterback Gene Mayfield. Mayfield completed a pass to Billy Cross at the Cincinnati 40 and Cross broke several tackles to finish the 62-yard touchdown dash. With the game running out, the Bearcats managed to get to the West Texas A&M 27, but two straight sacks doomed Cincinnati.

=== Second Quarter ===
- West Texas A&M - Bill Cross 4-yard run (Roy Lee Dunn Kick)
- Cincinnati - Tom McKeever 3-yard run (kick failed)

=== Third Quarter ===
- Cincinnati - Bob Stratton 17-yard pass from Gene Rossi (Bill Shalonsky kick)
- West Texas A&M - Cross 62-yard pass from Gene Mayfield (Dunn kick)

== Statistics ==
Statistics	Cincinnati	West Texas A&M
First downs	12	19
Rushing yards	106	238
Passing yards	170	123
Passing A-C-I	30-14-3	15-6-3
Punts-Average	5-30.4	4-39.5
Fumbles-Lost	3-0	3-0
Penalties-Yards	8-70	8-80
