= 1950 South Dakota Coyotes football team =

American college football season

1950 South Dakota Coyotes football
- Conference: North Central Conference
- Record: 4–5 (3–3 NCC)
- Head coach: Harry Gamage (12th season)
- Home stadium: Inman Field

1950 North Central Conference football standings
	Conf.					Overall
Team	W		L		T	W		L		T
South Dakota State $	5	–	0	–	1	9	–	0	–	1
Iowa State Teachers	4	–	2	–	0	4	–	4	–	0
North Dakota	3	–	1	–	2	5	–	2	–	2
Morningside	3	–	2	–	1	6	–	2	–	1
South Dakota	3	–	3	–	0	4	–	5	–	0
Augustana (SD)	1	–	5	–	0	2	–	7	–	0
North Dakota State	0	–	6	–	0	2	–	7	–	0
$ – Conference champion

The 1950 South Dakota Coyotes football team was an American football team that represented the University of South Dakota as a member of the North Central Conference (NCC) during the 1950 college football season. In their 12th season under head coach Harry Gamage, the Coyotes compiled a 4–5 record (3–3 against NCC opponents), finished in fifth place out of seven teams in the NCC, and were outscored by a total of 230 to 201. They played their home games at Inman Field in Vermillion, South Dakota.

== Schedule ==
Date	Opponent	Site	Result	Attendance	Source
September 16	Huron*	Inman Field; Vermillion, SD	W 61–0		
September 23	at Wayne*	Detroit, MI	L 14–19	4,000	
September 30	Drake*	Inman Field; Vermillion, SD	L 13–41		
October 7	Augustana (SD)	Inman Field; Vermillion, SD	W 33–14		
October 14	at North Dakota	Memorial Stadium; Grand Forks, ND (rivalry)	L 7–28		
October 21	at Morningside	Sioux City, IA	L 0–10		
October 28	South Dakota State^{†}	Inman Field; Vermillion, SD (rivalry)	L 28–54	8,000-10,000	
November 4	at Iowa State Teachers	O. R. Latham Field; Cedar Falls, IA	W 14–7		
November 11	North Dakota State	Inman Field; Vermillion, SD	W 31–7	1,800	
*Non-conference game; ^{†}Homecoming
