= 1950 TCU Horned Frogs football team =

American college football season

1950 TCU Horned Frogs football
- Conference: Southwest Conference
- Record: 5–5 (3–3 SWC)
- Head coach: Dutch Meyer (17th season)
- Offensive scheme: Meyer spread
- Home stadium: Amon G. Carter Stadium

1950 Southwest Conference football standings
	Conf.					Overall
Team	W		L		T	W		L		T
No. 3 Texas $	6	–	0	–	0	9	–	2	–	0
Baylor	4	–	2	–	0	7	–	3	–	0
Texas A&M	3	–	3	–	0	7	–	4	–	0
TCU	3	–	3	–	0	5	–	5	–	0
Rice	2	–	4	–	0	6	–	4	–	0
SMU	2	–	4	–	0	6	–	4	–	0
Arkansas	1	–	5	–	0	2	–	8	–	0
$ – Conference champion; Rankings from AP Poll

The 1950 TCU Horned Frogs football team represented Texas Christian University (TCU) in the 1950 college football season. The Horned Frogs finished the season 5–5 overall and 3–3 in the Southwest Conference. The team was coached by Dutch Meyer in his seventeenth year as head coach. The Frogs played their home games in Amon G. Carter Stadium, which is located on campus in Fort Worth, Texas.

== Schedule ==
Date	Opponent	Site	Result	Attendance	Source
September 23	at Kansas*	Memorial Stadium; Lawrence, KS	W 14–7	32,000	
September 30	at Oklahoma A&M*	Lewis Field; Stillwater, OK	L 7–13	17,500	
October 7	Arkansas	Amon G. Carter Stadium; Fort Worth, TX	W 13–6	25,000	
October 14	Texas Tech*	Amon G. Carter Stadium; Fort Worth, TX (rivalry)	W 19–6	12,000	
October 21	at Texas A&M	Kyle Field; College Station, TX (rivalry)	L 23–42	20,000	
October 28	vs. Ole Miss*	Crump Stadium; Memphis, TN	L 7–19		
November 4	Baylor	Amon G. Carter Stadium; Fort Worth, TX (rivalry)	L 14–20	20,000	
November 18	No. 6 Texas	Amon G. Carter Stadium; Fort Worth, TX (rivalry)	L 7–21	30,000	
November 25	at Rice	Rice Stadium; Houston, TX	W 26–14	30,000	
December 2	at SMU	Cotton Bowl; Dallas, TX (rivalry)	W 27–13	55,000	
*Non-conference game; Rankings from AP Poll released prior to the game
