= 1950 Iowa State Teachers Panthers football team =

American college football season

1950 Iowa State Teachers Panthers football
- Conference: North Central Conference
- Record: 4–4 (4–2 NCC)
- Head coach: Clyde Starbeck (13th season)
- Home stadium: O. R. Latham Stadium

1950 North Central Conference football standings
	Conf.					Overall
Team	W		L		T	W		L		T
South Dakota State $	5	–	0	–	1	9	–	0	–	1
Iowa State Teachers	4	–	2	–	0	4	–	4	–	0
North Dakota	3	–	1	–	2	5	–	2	–	2
Morningside	3	–	2	–	1	6	–	2	–	1
South Dakota	3	–	3	–	0	4	–	5	–	0
Augustana (SD)	1	–	5	–	0	2	–	7	–	0
North Dakota State	0	–	6	–	0	2	–	7	–	0
$ – Conference champion

The 1950 Iowa State Teachers Panthers football team was an American football team that represented Iowa State Teachers College (later renamed University of Northern Iowa) as a member of the North Central Conference (NCC) during the 1950 college football season. In their 13th season under head coach Clyde Starbeck, the Panthers compiled a 4–4 record (4–2 in conference games) and finished in second place in the NCC.

Four I.S.C. players were named to the all-NCC team: halfbacks Home Bienfang and Bud Fisher; guard Hans Sorenson; and end Lee Wachenheim.

The team played its home games at O. R. Latham Stadium in Cedar Falls, Iowa.

== Schedule ==
Date	Opponent	Site	Result	Attendance	Source
September 16	South Dakota State	O. R. Latham Stadium; Cedar Falls, IA	L 13–34	6,000	
September 22	at North Dakota	Memorial Stadium; Grand Forks, ND	W 33–21	3,500	
September 30	North Dakota State	O. R. Latham Stadium; Cedar Falls, IA	W 33–25		
October 7	at Iowa State*	Clyde Williams Field; Ames, IA	L 8–26	11,001	
October 14	Drake*	O. R. Latham Stadium; Cedar Falls, IA (rivalry)	L 18–34	8,000	
October 21	at Augustana (SD)	Sioux Falls, SD	W 34–13		
October 28	at Morningside	Sioux City, IA	W 13–7		
November 4	at South Dakota	O. R. Latham Stadium; Cedar Falls, IA	L 7–14		
*Non-conference game
