= 1950 Texas A&M Aggies football team =

American college football season

1950 Texas A&M Aggies football

Presidential Cup Bowl champion

Presidential Cup Bowl, W 40–20 vs. Georgia
- Conference: Southwest Conference
- Record: 7–4 (3–3 SWC)
- Head coach: Harry Stiteler (3rd season)
- Home stadium: Kyle Field

1950 Southwest Conference football standings
	Conf.					Overall
Team	W		L		T	W		L		T
No. 3 Texas $	6	–	0	–	0	9	–	2	–	0
Baylor	4	–	2	–	0	7	–	3	–	0
Texas A&M	3	–	3	–	0	7	–	4	–	0
TCU	3	–	3	–	0	5	–	5	–	0
Rice	2	–	4	–	0	6	–	4	–	0
SMU	2	–	4	–	0	6	–	4	–	0
Arkansas	1	–	5	–	0	2	–	8	–	0
$ – Conference champion; Rankings from AP Poll

The 1950 Texas A&M Aggies football team represented Texas A&M University in the 1950 college football season as a member of the Southwest Conference (SWC). The Aggies were led by head coach Harry Stiteler in his third and final season and finished with a record of seven wins and four losses (7–4 overall, 3–3 in the SWC) and with a victory over Georgia in the Presidential Cup Bowl.

== Schedule ==
Date	Opponent	Rank	Site	Result	Attendance	Source
September 23	vs. Nevada*		Charles C. Hughes Stadium; Sacramento, CA	W 48–18	10,000	
September 30	vs. Texas Tech*		Alamo Stadium; San Antonio, TX (rivalry)	W 34–13	22,000–24,000	
October 7	at No. 5 Oklahoma*		Oklahoma Memorial Stadium; Norman, OK	L 28–34	36,586	
October 14	VMI*		Kyle Field; College Station, TX	W 52–0	20,000	
October 21	TCU		Kyle Field; College Station, TX (rivalry)	W 42–23	20,000	
October 28	at Baylor	No. 13	Baylor Stadium; Waco, TX (rivalry)	L 20–27	37,000	
November 4	Arkansas		Kyle Field; College Station, TX (rivalry)	W 42–13	17,000	
November 11	at No. 7 SMU		Cotton Bowl; Dallas, TX	W 25–20	75,447	
November 18	Rice	No. 12	Kyle Field; College Station, TX	L 13–21	30,000	
November 30	at No. 5 Texas		Memorial Stadium; Austin, TX (rivalry)	L 0–17	65,498	
December 9	vs. Georgia*		Byrd Stadium; College Park, MD (Presidential Cup Bowl)	W 40–20	12,245	
*Non-conference game; Rankings from AP Poll released prior to the game
