= 1951 Salad Bowl =

Miami Redskins	Arizona State Sun Devils
(8–1)	(9–1)
34	21
Head coach: Woody Hayes	Head coach: Ed Doherty
	1	2	3	4	Total
Miami	7	14	6	7	34
Arizona State	0	7	7	7	21
- Date: January 1, 1951
- Season: 1950
- Stadium: Montgomery Stadium
- Location: Phoenix, Arizona
- Attendance: 24,000

The 1951 Salad Bowl was a college football postseason bowl game between the Arizona State Sun Devils and the Miami Redskins.

== Background ==
The Sun Devils were making their fourth bowl appearance in 11 years, and 2nd straight Salad Bowl after a 2nd place finish in the Border Intercollegiate Athletic Association. Miami was making their second bowl appearance in three years after being champion of the Mid-American Conference.

== Game summary ==
A fierce Miami defense held Arizona State All-American Wilford White to 106 yards rushing as for the fourth time the visiting team won the Salad Bowl. White was held to his second-lowest rushing total of the season, though he did rush for one touchdown and also caught a touchdown. But Miami had a 21–7 halftime lead, as the Sun Devils could only muster 14 points to Miami's 13 in the second half. A balanced offensive attack led the way for Miami, who became the third straight visiting team to win the Salad Bowl. John Pont got the scoring started with a touchdown run in the first quarter. Jim Bailey had 108 yards rushing and two touchdowns while quarterback Nobby Wirkowski completed 16 of 24 passes for 231 yards and one touchdown.

=== Scoring summary ===
- MU – Pont 1 run (Stauffer kick)
- MU – Bailey 1 run (Stauffer kick)
- ASC – White 27 pass from Aja (Fuller kick)
- ASC – Wahlin 4 run (Fuller kick)
- MU – Maccioli 7 pass from Wirkowski (kick failed)
- MU – Bailey 50 run (Stauffer kick)
- ASC – White 15 run (Fuller kick)

== Statistics ==
Statistics	Arizona State	Miami (Ohio)
First downs	21	22
Rushing yards	240	225
Passes attempted	22	24
Passes completed	10	16
Passes intercepted	2	2
Passing yards	171	231
Penalties–yards	6–32	4–20
Punts–average	5–33.2	5–28.5
Fumbles lost	3	2

== Aftermath ==
The Redskins (later renamed the RedHawks) would wait 11 years to play in another bowl game. The Sun Devils would wait longer, until 1970. Doherty left the Sun Devils after the game, citing job security. Hayes also left, for Ohio State.
