= 1950 Arizona State Sun Devils football team =

American college football season

1950 Arizona State Sun Devils football

Salad Bowl, L 21–34 vs. Miami (OH)
- Conference: Border Conference
- Record: 9–2 (4–1 Border)
- Head coach: Ed Doherty (4th season)
- Home stadium: Goodwin Stadium

1950 Border Conference football standings
	Conf.					Overall
Team	W		L		T	W		L		T
West Texas State $	6	–	0	–	0	10	–	1	–	0
Arizona State	4	–	1	–	0	9	–	2	–	0
Texas Western	4	–	2	–	0	7	–	3	–	0
Texas Tech	3	–	2	–	0	3	–	8	–	0
Hardin–Simmons	3	–	3	–	0	5	–	5	–	0
Arizona	2	–	4	–	0	4	–	6	–	0
New Mexico	2	–	5	–	0	2	–	8	–	0
New Mexico A&M	1	–	4	–	0	2	–	7	–	0
Arizona State–Flagstaff	0	–	4	–	0	2	–	7	–	0
$ – Conference champion

The 1950 Arizona State Sun Devils football team was an American football team that represented Arizona State College (later renamed Arizona State University) in the Border Conference during the 1950 college football season. In their fourth season under head coach Ed Doherty, the Sun Devils compiled a 9–2 record (4–1 against Border opponents), lost to Miami (OH) in the Salad Bowl, and outscored their opponents by a combined total of 404 to 154.

Halfback Wilford White led the country with 1,501 rushing yards on 199 carries (7.55 yard average); he also ranked second in scoring with 130 points scored (22 touchdowns, one point after touchdown, and one field goal).

As a team, the Sun Devils led all major college football teams in both total offense (470.4 yards per game) and rushing defense (347.0 yards per game).

== Schedule ==
Date	Opponent	Site	Result	Attendance	Source
September 23	at BYU*	Cougar Stadium; Provo, UT	W 41–13	9,000	
September 30	New Mexico	Goodwin Stadium; Tempe, AZ	W 41–6		
October 7	Arizona State–Flagstaff	Goodwin Stadium; Tempe, AZ	W 63–0		
October 14	at Hardin–Simmons	Parramore Stadium; Abilene, TX	L 14–41		
October 21	Utah State*	Goodwin Stadium; Tempe, AZ	W 28–0		
October 28	New Mexico A&M	Goodwin Stadium; Tempe, AZ	W 49–0		
November 4	San Diego State*^{†}	Goodwin Stadium; Tempe, AZ	W 31–13	14,000–17,000	
November 11	at Arizona	Arizona Stadium; Tucson, AZ (rivalry)	W 47–13	26,500	
November 18	Colorado A&M*	Goodwin Stadium; Tempe, AZ	W 21–13		
November 25	Idaho*	Goodwin Stadium; Tempe, AZ	W 48–21		
January 1, 1951	vs. Miami (OH)*	Montgomery Stadium; Phoenix, AZ (Salad Bowl)	L 21–34	24,000	
*Non-conference game; ^{†}Homecoming
