= Hazel Run, Minnesota =

City in Minnesota, United States

Hazel Run
- City
- Location of Hazel Run, Minnesota
- Coordinates: 44°44′54″N 95°43′00″W
- Country: United States
- State: Minnesota
- County: Yellow Medicine

Area
  - Total: 0.76 sq mi (1.97 km^{2})
  - Land: 0.76 sq mi (1.97 km^{2})
  - Water: 0 sq mi (0.00 km^{2})
- Elevation: 1,047 ft (319 m)

Population (2020)
  - Total: 55
  - Density: 72.3/sq mi (27.93/km^{2})
- Time zone: UTC-6 (Central (CST))
  - Summer (DST): UTC-5 (CDT)
- ZIP code: 56241
- Area code: 320
- FIPS code: 27-28016
- GNIS feature ID: 2394339

Hazel Run is a city in Yellow Medicine County, Minnesota, United States. The population was 55 at the 2020 census.

== History ==
Hazel Run was platted in 1884. A post office was established at Hazel Run in 1884, and remained in operation until 1992. Hazel Run was incorporated in 1902.

== Geography ==
According to the United States Census Bureau, the city has a total area of 0.75 square miles (1.94 km^{2}), all land.

== Demographics ==
Historical population
Census	Pop.	Note	%±
1910	121		—
1920	145		19.8%
1930	143		−1.4%
1940	126		−11.9%
1950	129		2.4%
1960	115		−10.9%
1970	115		0.0%
1980	93		−19.1%
1990	81		−12.9%
2000	64		−21.0%
2010	63		−1.6%
2020	55		−12.7%
U.S. Decennial Census

=== 2010 census ===
As of the census of 2010, there were 63 people, 27 households, and 21 families residing in the city. The population density was 84.0 inhabitants per square mile (32.4/km^{2}). There were 29 housing units at an average density of 38.7 per square mile (14.9/km^{2}). The racial makeup of the city was 92.1% White, 1.6% Native American, 1.6% from other races, and 4.8% from two or more races. Hispanic or Latino of any race were 3.2% of the population.

There were 27 households, of which 22.2% had children under the age of 18 living with them, 63.0% were married couples living together, 7.4% had a female householder with no husband present, 7.4% had a male householder with no wife present, and 22.2% were non-families. 18.5% of all households were made up of individuals, and 3.7% had someone living alone who was 65 years of age or older. The average household size was 2.33 and the average family size was 2.62.

The median age in the city was 41.5 years. 20.6% of residents were under the age of 18; 8% were between the ages of 18 and 24; 26.9% were from 25 to 44; 25.5% were from 45 to 64; and 19% were 65 years of age or older. The gender makeup of the city was 55.6% male and 44.4% female.

=== 2000 census ===
As of the census of 2000, there were 64 people, 27 households, and 18 families residing in the city. The population density was 85.1 inhabitants per square mile (32.9/km^{2}). There were 31 housing units at an average density of 41.2 per square mile (15.9/km^{2}). The racial makeup of the city was 100.00% White.

There were 27 households, out of which 29.6% had children under the age of 18 living with them, 55.6% were married couples living together, 11.1% had a female householder with no husband present, and 33.3% were non-families. 29.6% of all households were made up of individuals, and 14.8% had someone living alone who was 65 years of age or older. The average household size was 2.37 and the average family size was 3.00.

In the city, the population was spread out, with 29.7% under the age of 18, 7.8% from 18 to 24, 32.8% from 25 to 44, 18.8% from 45 to 64, and 10.9% who were 65 years of age or older. The median age was 36 years. For every 100 females, there were 73.0 males. For every 100 females age 18 and over, there were 87.5 males.

The median income for a household in the city was $24,643, and the median income for a family was $32,813. Males had a median income of $27,500 versus $18,125 for females. The per capita income for the city was $17,125. There were 11.8% of families and 19.4% of the population living below the poverty line, including 22.2% of under eighteens and 33.3% of those over 64.
