= Ralph Lundeen =

American football and basketball coach (1917–2004)

Biographical details
- Born: May 3, 1917; Minneapolis, Minnesota, U.S.
- Died: March 30, 2004 (aged 86); Minneapolis, Minnesota, U.S.

Playing career

Football
- 1940: Minnesota
- 1945–1946: Minnesota
- Position: End

Coaching career (HC unless noted)

Football
- 1950–1953: Huron
- 1954–1956: Macalester (assistant)
- 1957–1958: Macalester

Basketball
- 1950–1954: Huron
- 1954–1957: Macalester (assistant)
- 1957: Macalester

Administrative career (AD unless noted)
- 1950–1954: Huron
- 1954–1984: Macalester

Head coaching record
- Overall: 32–18–1

Accomplishments and honors

Championships
- National (1940)

Ralph John Lundeen (May 3, 1917 – March 30, 2004) was an American football and basketball coach. He served as the head football coach at Huron College—later known as Huron University—in Huron, South Dakota from 1950 to 1953, and Macalester College in St. Paul, Minnesota from 1957 to 1958. Lundeen played college football at the University of Minnesota during the early 1940s.

== Head coaching record ==
=== Football ===
| Year | Team | Overall | Conference | Standing | Bowl/playoffs |
|---|---|---|---|---|---|
Huron Scalpers (South Dakota Intercollegiate Conference) (1950–1953)
| 1950 | Huron | 6–3 | 6–1 | 2nd | |
| 1951 | Huron | 5–3 | 3–3 | T–5th | |
| 1952 | Huron | 6–2 | 6–2 | 2nd | |
| 1953 | Huron | 6–3 | 5–2 | 2nd | |
| Huron: | | 23–11 | 20–8 | | |
Macalester Scots (Minnesota Intercollegiate Athletic Conference) (1957–1958)
| 1957 | Macalester | 6–1–1 | 5–1–1 | T–2nd | |
| 1958 | Macalester | 3–6 | 2–5 | T–6th | |
| Macalester: | | 9–7–1 | 7–6–1 | | |
| Total: | | 32–18–1 | | | |
