= Gene Cheever =

American football player and coach (1928–2011)

Biographical details
- Born: December 30, 1928; Brookings, South Dakota, U.S.
- Died: January 13, 2011 (aged 82); Rapid City, South Dakota, U.S.

Playing career
- 1947–1950: South Dakota State
- Position: Halfback

Coaching career (HC unless noted)
- 1952–1953: Dakota Wesleyan
- 1954–1955: Watertown HS (SD)

Head coaching record
- Overall: 8–7 (college)

Eugene G. Cheever (December 30, 1928 – January 13, 2011) was an American football player and coach. He served as the head football coach at Dakota Wesleyan University in Mitchell, South Dakota from 1952 to 1953, compiling a record of 8–7.

== Head coaching record ==
=== College ===
Year	Team	Overall	Conference	Standing	Bowl/playoffs
Dakota Wesleyan Tigers (South Dakota Intercollegiate Conference) (1952–1953)
1952	Dakota Wesleyan	3–4	3–3	6th	
1953	Dakota Wesleyan	5–3	3–3	5th	
Dakota Wesleyan:		8–7	6–6		
Total:		8–7			
