= Alex Smail =

American football player (1926–2004)

- Smail in high school

No. 72
- Position: Defensive tackle

Personal information
- Born: May 31, 1926; Detroit, Michigan, U.S.
- Died: June 21, 2004 (aged 78); Dearborn, Michigan, U.S.
- Listed height: 5 ft 8 in (1.73 m)
- Listed weight: 235 lb (107 kg)

Career information
- High school: Fordson (Dearborn, Michigan)
- College: Detroit
- NFL draft: 1951: undrafted

Career history
- Detroit Lions (1951)*; Hamilton Tiger-Cats (1952)*; Pittsburgh Steelers (1952)
- * Offseason or practice squad member only
- Stats at Pro Football Reference

Alex Smail (May 31, 1926 – June 21, 2004) was an American professional football defensive tackle who played for the Pittsburgh Steelers of the National Football League (NFL). He played college football for the Detroit Titans.

== Early life ==
Alex Smail was born on May 31, 1926, in Detroit, Michigan. He played high school football at Fordson High School in Dearborn, Michigan, earning all-state honors in 1943 while helping Fordson win the state title.

== College career ==
Smail accepted an athletic scholarship to play college football for the Michigan State Spartans but was drafted into the United States Army. He played for the 1945 Camp Beale Bears football team. After being discharged from the army, he returned to Michigan State but soon returned home due to his father being sick.

Smail later enrolled at the University of Detroit to play football for the Titans. As a senior in 1950, he earned first-team All-Missouri Valley Conference honors at guard.

== Professional career ==
Smail signed with the Detroit Lions after going undrafted in the 1951 NFL draft. He was released on September 24, 1951, before the start of the regular season.

Smail signed with the Hamilton Tiger-Cats of the Interprovincial Rugby Football Union on July 30, 1952, as a tackle. He only attended one practice before leaving to sign with the Pittsburgh Steelers. He played in one regular season game for the Steelers as a reserve defensive tackle. On October 2, 1952, it was reported that Smail had been released so the Steelers could sign Earl Murray.

== Personal life ==
Smail died on June 21, 2004, in Dearborn, Michigan.
