= 1950 Kansas Jayhawks football team =

American college football season

1950 Kansas Jayhawks football
- Conference: Big Seven Conference
- Record: 6–4 (3–3 Big 7)
- Head coach: Jules V. Sikes (3rd season)
- Captains: John Amberg; Mike McCormack
- Home stadium: Memorial Stadium

1950 Big Seven Conference football standings
	Conf.					Overall
Team	W		L		T	W		L		T
No. 1 Oklahoma $	6	–	0	–	0	10	–	1	–	0
No. 17 Nebraska	4	–	2	–	0	6	–	2	–	1
Missouri	3	–	2	–	1	4	–	5	–	1
Kansas	3	–	3	–	0	6	–	4	–	0
Iowa State	2	–	3	–	1	3	–	6	–	1
Colorado	2	–	4	–	0	5	–	4	–	1
Kansas State	0	–	6	–	0	1	–	9	–	1
$ – Conference champion; Rankings from AP Poll

The 1950 Kansas Jayhawks football team represented the University of Kansas in the Big Seven Conference during the 1950 college football season. In their third season under head coach Jules V. Sikes, the Jayhawks compiled a 6–4 record (3–3 against conference opponents), finished fourth in the Big Seven Conference, and outscored all opponents by a combined total of 284 to 188. They played their home games at Memorial Stadium in Lawrence, Kansas.

The team's statistical leaders included Wade Stinson with 1,129 rushing yards (the program's first 1,000-yard rusher) and 84 points scored, and Chet Strehlow with 651 passing yards. John Amberg and Mike McCormack were the team captains. Other notable members of the team included George Mrkonic.

== Schedule ==
Date	Opponent	Rank	Site	Result	Attendance	Source
September 23	TCU*		Memorial Stadium; Lawrence, KS	L 7–14	32,000	
September 29	at Denver*		DU Stadium; Denver, CO	W 46–6	14,218	
October 7	Colorado		Memorial Stadium; Lawrence, KS	W 27–21	24,000–25,000	
October 14	at Iowa State		Clyde Williams Field; Ames, IA	W 33–21	17,392	
October 21	Oklahoma A&M*		Memorial Stadium; Lawrence, KS	W 40–7	22,500	
October 28	Nebraska^{†}		Memorial Stadium; Lawrence, KS (rivalry)	L 26–33	39,000	
November 4	at Utah*		Ute Stadium; Salt Lake City, UT	W 39–26	13,111	
November 11	No. 3 Oklahoma	No. 19	Memorial Stadium; Lawrence, KS	L 13–33	37,621	
November 18	at Kansas State		Memorial Stadium; Manhattan, KS (rivalry)	W 47–7	18,000	
November 23	at Missouri		Memorial Stadium; Columbia, MO (Border War)	L 6–20	18,000	
*Non-conference game; ^{†}Homecoming; Rankings from AP Poll released prior to the game
