= 1950 Nebraska Cornhuskers football team =

American college football season

1950 Nebraska Cornhuskers football
- Conference: Big Seven Conference

Ranking
- AP: No. 17
- Record: 6–2–1 (4–2 Big 7)
- Head coach: Bill Glassford (2nd season)
- Offensive scheme: T formation
- Home stadium: Memorial Stadium

1950 Big Seven Conference football standings
	Conf.					Overall
Team	W		L		T	W		L		T
No. 1 Oklahoma $	6	–	0	–	0	10	–	1	–	0
No. 17 Nebraska	4	–	2	–	0	6	–	2	–	1
Missouri	3	–	2	–	1	4	–	5	–	1
Kansas	3	–	3	–	0	6	–	4	–	0
Iowa State	2	–	3	–	1	3	–	6	–	1
Colorado	2	–	4	–	0	5	–	4	–	1
Kansas State	0	–	6	–	0	1	–	9	–	1
$ – Conference champion; Rankings from AP Poll

The 1950 Nebraska Cornhuskers football team was the representative of the University of Nebraska and member of the Big 7 Conference in the 1950 college football season. The team was coached by Bill Glassford and played their home games at Memorial Stadium in Lincoln, Nebraska.

Halfback Bobby Reynolds led the country in scoring (157 points), ranked second nationally in rushing (1,342 yards) and finished fifth in the 1950 Heisman Trophy voting.

As a team, the Cornhuskers ranked third nationally in rushing offense (321.6 yards per game) and ninth in total offense (407.3 yards per game).

== Before the season ==
After the dark decade of the 1940s, where the Cornhusker program found only one winning season, second-year head coach Glassford had arrived and brought a faint hope to the Cornhusker faithful by fielding a 1949 team that appeared competitive. As coach Glassford settled in for his second year, he increased the coaching staff from seven to nine personnel, and the new decade opened with hopes that Nebraska could once again take its place among the best of the college football programs in the United States.

On April 8, 1950, Nebraska held its first ever Spring Game scrimmage (later known as the Red-White Game) against a team of Nebraska alumni players (supplemented by a handful of varsity members). The two teams played to a 13–13 tie.

== Schedule ==
Date	Time	Opponent	Rank	Site	Result	Attendance	Source
September 30	2:00 pm	Indiana*		Memorial Stadium; Lincoln, NE	T 20–20	33,000	
October 7	1:30 pm	at Minnesota*		Memorial Stadium; Minneapolis, MN (rivalry)	W 32–26	48,365	
October 14	3:00 pm	at Colorado		Folsom Field; Boulder, CO (rivalry)	L 19–28	25,000	
October 21	2:00 pm	Penn State*		Memorial Stadium; Lincoln, NE	W 19–0	38,000	
October 28	2:00 pm	at Kansas		Memorial Stadium; Lawrence, KS (rivalry)	W 33–26	39,000	
November 4	2:00 pm	Missouri^{†}		Memorial Stadium; Lincoln, NE (rivalry)	W 40–34	38,000	
November 11	2:00 pm	Kansas State	No. 16	Memorial Stadium; Lincoln, NE (rivalry)	W 49–21	29,000	
November 18	2:00 pm	Iowa State	No. 18	Memorial Stadium; Lincoln, NE (rivalry)	W 20–13	37,193	
November 25	2:00 pm	at No. 1 Oklahoma	No. 16	Oklahoma Memorial Stadium; Norman, OK (rivalry)	L 35–49	53,066	
*Non-conference game; ^{†}Homecoming; Rankings from AP Poll released prior to the game; All times are in Central time

== Roster ==
30 Adduci, Nick FB; 61 Bauer, Arthur G; 40 Bloom, Don HB; 72 Boll, Don T; 65 Brasee, Carl G; 55 Britt, Ted C; 87 Carney E; 45 Carroll, Jack HB; 13 Clark, Ron HB; 86 Connor, Ted T; 31 Curtis, Clayton HB; 46 Dinklage T; Dorn, Harold HB; 14 Ferguson, Gerald HB; 78 Fiene T; 79 Godfrey, James T; 76 Goeglein, Richard T; 67 Goll, Dick G; 47 Grimm T; 71 Handshy, Wayne T; 63 Harper, Tom G; 68 Hoy, Rex G; 66 Husmann, Ed G; 20 Lehman HB; 44 Levendusky, James HB	75 Maxe, Bill T; 51 McGill, Joe C; 22 Meyer, Frank G; 41 Mueller, William HB; 74 Mullen, Robert T; 21 Nagle, Fran QB; 88 Novak, Ray E; 82 Paynich, George E; 69 Pedersen, Donald G; 10 Ponsiego, Joe G; 83 Prochaska, George E; 73 Reese, Herbert E; 80 Regier, Dick E; 12 Reynolds, Bobby HB; 84 Roper E; 50 Schroeder, Ken C; 52 Scott, Verl C; 81 Simon, Frank E; 15 Sommers, James HB; 64 Spellman, Walt G; 62 Strasheim, Don G; 53 Thibault, Hyle C; 70 Toogood, Charles T; 16 Winey, Leo FB; 89 Wingender, Bill FB

Bob Tritsch- Student Manager 1948–1951, Senior Student Manager 1950–51

== Depth Chart ==
Defense by committee

HB

CB

LB	LB

RE	RT	RG	LT	LT	LE

CB

Offensive starters

LE
Frank Simon
Gerald Ferguson
George Paynich

LG	C	RG	LT	RT
Art Bauer	Joe McGill	Don Strasheim	Charlie Toogood	Walt Spellman
Rex Hoy	Verl Scott	Carl Brasee	Don Boll	Wayne Handshy

RE
Dick Regier
George Prochaska

QB
Fran Nagle

LB	RB	FB
Bobby Reynolds	William Mueller	Nick Adduci; Bill Wingender
Don Bloom	Ron Clark	Clayton Curtis

== Coaching staff ==
Name	Title	First year in this position	Years at Nebraska	Alma mater
Bill Glassford	Head coach	1949	1949–1955	Pittsburgh
L. F. "Pop" Klein	Assistant coach	1945	1945–1958	
Ray Prochaska	Ends coach	1950	1947–1948, 1950–1954	Nebraska
Ike Hanscomb	Freshman coach	1948	1948–1953	
Bob Davis	Backfield coach	1949	1949–1955	
Peter Janetos	Freshman coach	1949	1949–1952	
Marvin Franklin	Defensive coach	1950	1949–1951	Vanderbilt
Ralph Fife	Offensive Line coach	1950	1950–1952	
Neal Mehring	Defensive coach	1950	1950–1951	

== Game summaries ==
=== Indiana ===
Team	1	2	Total
Indiana			20
Nebraska			20

- Date: September 30
- Location: Memorial Stadium • Lincoln, Nebraska
- Game attendance: 33,000

Nebraska put a stop to Indiana's seven-game winning streak against the Cornhuskers by bringing a strong performance to the opening game of the season. The Hoosiers escaped a defeat only by a handful of fumbles lost by Cornhusker miscues. It was the first time since 1938 that Nebraska had fought a contest to a tie, a 0–0 scoreless affair which also happened to be against Indiana. The Cornhuskers pulled up to 3–7–3 against Indiana to date.

Indiana Game starters

Position	Player
Quarterback	Fran Nagel
Left Back	Bobby Reynolds
Right back	William Mueller
Fullback	Clayton Curtis
Right End	Dick Regier
Right Tackle	Walt Spellman
Left Tackle	Charles Toogood
Right Guard	Don Strasheim
Center	Joe McGill
Left Guard	Art Baur
Left End	Frank Simon

Position	Player
Left End	Bill Maxe
Left Tackle	Ted Connor
Left Guard	Don Boll
Right Guard	Verl Scott
Right Tackle	Robert Mullen
Right End	Rich Goeglein
Linebacker	Herbert Reese
Linebacker	Ron Clark
Cornerback	Nick Adduci
Cornerback	Don Bloom
Safety	George Prochaska

=== Minnesota ===
Team	1	2	Total
• Nebraska			32
Minnesota			26

- Date: October 7
- Location: Memorial Stadium • Minneapolis
- Game attendance: 48,365

Encouraged by the strong showing the week prior against the Hoosiers, Nebraska traveled to Minneapolis and refused to be intimidated by the Golden Gophers. By the time Minnesota managed to score, Nebraska was already enjoying a 26–0 lead and had the Gophers on their heels. Minnesota's adjustments after halftime brought some results, but not enough for them to escape the rare home field defeat. Minnesota's ten-game winning streak against Nebraska was snapped at last, and the Cornhuskers reveled in their first win in Minneapolis since a 6–0 decision against the Gophers dating back to 1902. Nebraska now stood at 5–25–2 in the series and had much ground to cover if they ever hoped to catch up, but the momentous win was cause to celebrate. Perhaps Nebraska was finally on the way back.

Minnesota Game starters

Position	Player
Quarterback	Fran Nagel
Left Back	Bobby Reynolds
Right back	William Mueller
Fullback	Bill Wingender
Right End	Dick Regier
Right Tackle	Walt Spellman
Left Tackle	Charles Toogood
Right Guard	Don Strasheim
Center	Joe McGill
Left Guard	Art Baur
Left End	Frank Simon

Position	Player
Left End	Bill Maxe
Left Tackle	Don Boll
Left Guard	Rex Hoy
Right Guard	Verl Scott
Right Tackle	Robert Mullen
Right End	Rich Goeglein
Linebacker	Herbert Reese
Linebacker	Ron Clark
Cornerback	Nick Adduci
Cornerback	Don Bloom
Safety	George Prochaska

=== Colorado ===
Team	1	2	Total
Nebraska			19
• Colorado			28

- Date: October 14
- Location: Folsom Field • Boulder, Colorado
- Game attendance: 25,000

Fresh from their triumph in Minneapolis, the Cornhuskers arrived in Boulder looking for another win to establish the return of the program to greatness. Colorado would have none of that, however, and dealt the uninspired Nebraska squad its first loss of the season to move to 3–6–3 in the series.

Colorado Game starters

Position	Player
Quarterback	Fran Nagel
Left Back	Bobby Reynolds
Right back	William Mueller
Fullback	Bill Wingender
Right End	Dick Regier
Right Tackle	Wayne Handshy
Left Tackle	Charles Toogood
Right Guard	Don Strasheim
Center	Joe McGill
Left Guard	Walt Spellman
Left End	Gerald Ferguson

Position	Player
Left End	Bill Maxe
Left Tackle	Don Boll
Left Guard	Dick Goll
Right Guard	Verl Scott
Right Tackle	Ed Husmann
Right End	Rich Goeglein
Linebacker	George Prochaska
Linebacker	Ron Clark
Cornerback	Nick Adduci
Cornerback	Don Bloom
Safety	Robert Mullen

=== Penn State ===
Team	1	2	Total
Penn State			0
• Nebraska			19

- Date: October 21
- Location: Memorial Stadium • Lincoln, Nebraska
- Game attendance: 38,000

Nebraska bounced back from the flat performance of the week before, and was firing on all cylinders when Penn State arrived in Lincoln for the first time ever in the third meeting of these teams. Cornhusker HB Bobby Reynolds accounted for more personal yards on the day then the entire Nittany Lion team, and the Nebraska defense held strong to prevent Penn State from ever finding the scoreboard, securing the first Nebraska win in the series. So far, except for the aberration in Boulder, the season had opened with exceptional success as the Cornhuskers were undefeated against three powerhouse teams, two of which were longtime rivals.

Penn State Game starters

Position	Player
Quarterback	Fran Nagel
Left Back	Bobby Reynolds
Right back	William Mueller
Fullback	Bill Wingender
Right End	Dick Regier
Right Tackle	Wayne Handshy
Left Tackle	Charles Toogood
Right Guard	Don Strasheim
Center	Joe McGill
Left Guard	Walt Spellman
Left End	Gerald Ferguson

Position	Player
Left End	George Paynich
Left Tackle	Don Boll
Left Guard	Carl Brasee
Right Guard	Verl Scott
Right Tackle	Tom Harper
Right End	Robert Mullen
Linebacker	George Prochaska
Linebacker	Bobby Reynolds
Cornerback	Ed Husmann
Cornerback	Don Bloom
Safety	Clayton Curtis

=== Kansas ===
Team	1	2	Total
• Nebraska			33
Kansas			26

- Date: October 28
- Location: Memorial Stadium • Lawrence, Kansas
- Game attendance: 39,000

The Cornhuskers continued to build on the season's rising tide of successes by defeating the Jayhawks in Lawrence, snapping their three-game skid against Kansas. Nebraska was now 41–12–3 against the Jayhawks all-time.

Kansas Game starters

Position	Player
Quarterback	Fran Nagel
Left Back	Bobby Reynolds
Right back	Ron Clark
Fullback	Clayton Curtis
Right End	Dick Regier
Right Tackle	Walt Spellman
Left Tackle	Charles Toogood
Right Guard	Don Strasheim
Center	Joe McGill
Left Guard	Art Baur
Left End	Frank Simon

Position	Player
Left End	George Prochaska
Left Tackle	Charles Toogood
Left Guard	Don Boll
Right Guard	Ed Husmann
Right Tackle	Rich Goeglein
Right End	George Paynich
Linebacker	Robert Mullen
Linebacker	Verl Scott
Cornerback	Ron Clark
Cornerback	Don Bloom
Safety	Nick Adduci

=== Missouri ===
Team	1	2	Total
Missouri			34
• Nebraska			40

- Date: November 4
- Location: Memorial Stadium • Lincoln, Nebraska
- Game attendance: 38,000

The 1950 homecoming game was attended by former Cornhusker football players who had battled in the 1941 Rose Bowl ten seasons prior, and the new decade's version of the Cornhuskers did not disappoint. For the first time since 1945, Nebraska pulled in a homecoming victory, in an offensive shootout that amassed over 1,000 combined offensive yards by both teams. The defeat of Missouri ended a five-game Tiger winning streak, and put Nebraska ahead in the series at 25–15–3.

Missouri Game starters

Position	Player
Quarterback	Fran Nagel
Left Back	Bobby Reynolds
Right back	Ron Clark
Fullback	Nick Adduci
Right End	Dick Regier
Right Tackle	Walt Spellman
Left Tackle	Charles Toogood
Right Guard	Don Strasheim
Center	Joe McGill
Left Guard	Art Baur
Left End	Frank Simon

Position	Player
Left End	Bill Maxe
Left Tackle	Charles Toogood
Left Guard	Rex Hoy
Right Guard	Verl Scott
Right Tackle	Don Boll
Right End	Robert Mullen
Linebacker	George Prochaska
Linebacker	Ron Clark
Cornerback	Clayton Curtis
Cornerback	Don Bloom
Safety	Carl Brasee

=== Kansas State ===
Team	1	2	Total
Kansas State			21
• #16 Nebraska			49

- Date: November 11
- Location: Memorial Stadium • Lincoln, Nebraska
- Game attendance: 29,000

Kansas State found itself in the path of a rolling Cornhusker squad that was listed in the AP Poll for the first time since 1941, and was unable to get out of the way as the Cornhuskers hung 49 points on the scoreboard before the final whistle, which was the most points scored in a single game by Nebraska since a 53–0 blanking of lowly South Dakota in 1945. Nebraska had now defeated the Wildcats in eight straight meetings and continued to lead the series at 28–4–2.

Kansas State Game starters

Position	Player
Quarterback	Fran Nagel
Left Back	Bobby Reynolds
Right back	Ron Clark
Fullback	Nick Adduci
Right End	Dick Regier
Right Tackle	Walt Spellman
Left Tackle	Charles Toogood
Right Guard	Don Strasheim
Center	Joe McGill
Left Guard	Art Baur
Left End	Frank Simon

Position	Player
Left End	Georgie Paynich
Left Tackle	Charles Toogood
Left Guard	Don Boll
Right Guard	Verl Scott
Right Tackle	Carl Brasee
Right End	Rich Goeglein
Linebacker	George Prochaska
Linebacker	Ron Clark
Cornerback	Clayton Curtis
Cornerback	Don Bloom
Safety	Robert Mullen

=== Iowa State ===
Team	1	2	Total
Iowa State			13
• #18 Nebraska			20

- Date: November 18
- Location: Memorial Stadium • Lincoln, Nebraska
- Game attendance: 37,193

Apparently the voters in the AP Poll were not adequately impressed with Nebraska's win over downtrodden Kansas State the previous week, as the Cornhuskers actually fell two spots in the poll before facing Iowa State in Lincoln. A single touchdown proved to be the difference in the game, as the Cyclones fought a fairly close game, holding Nebraska to under 30 points for the first time in four games. The Cornhuskers increased their commanding series lead to 35–8–1.

Iowa State Game starters

Position	Player
Quarterback	Fran Nagel
Left Back	Bobby Reynolds
Right back	Ron Clark
Fullback	Nick Adduci
Right End	Dick Regier
Right Tackle	Walt Spellman
Left Tackle	Charles Toogood
Right Guard	Don Strasheim
Center	Joe McGill
Left Guard	Art Baur
Left End	Frank Simon

Position	Player
Left End	Charles Toogood
Left Tackle	Rich Goeglein
Left Guard	Rex Hoy
Right Guard	Verl Scott
Right Tackle	Carl Brasee
Right End	Don Boll
Linebacker	George Prochaska
Linebacker	Ron Clark
Cornerback	Leo Winey
Cornerback	Don Bloom
Safety	Robert Mullen

=== Oklahoma ===
Team	1	2	Total
#16 Nebraska			35
• #1 Oklahoma			49

- Date: November 25
- Location: Oklahoma Memorial Stadium • Norman, Oklahoma
- Game attendance: 53,066

Nebraska faced its stiffest test of the season when the Cornhuskers traveled to Norman to close the regular season, as the Sooners held a record seven-game winning streak over Nebraska and was the #1 ranked team in the AP Poll going into the game. Nebraska fought in front of a substantial crowd, managing to put up 35 points against the number one team in the land on their own turf, but Oklahoma romped over the Cornhusker defenses and racked up 49 points of their own to finish the season on top of the conference and the nation. Nebraska's record single-team losing streak, held by Oklahoma, was extended to eight games. The Sooners finished the season undefeated at 9–0–0, and closed the series record gap between the squads to 10–16–3.

Oklahoma Game starters

Position	Player
Quarterback	Fran Nagel
Left Back	Bobby Reynolds
Right back	Ron Clark
Fullback	Nick Adduci
Right End	Dick Regier
Right Tackle	Walt Spellman
Left Tackle	Charles Toogood
Right Guard	Don Strasheim
Center	Joe McGill
Left Guard	Art Baur
Left End	Frank Simon

Position	Player
Left End	Charles Toogood
Left Tackle	Don Boll
Left Guard	Rex Hoy
Right Guard	Verl Scott
Right Tackle	Carl Brasee
Right End	Rich Goeglein
Linebacker	George Prochaska
Linebacker	Robert Mullen
Cornerback	Leo Winey
Cornerback	Don Bloom
Safety	Ron Clark

== Rankings ==
Ranking movements Legend: ██ Increase in ranking ██ Decrease in ranking — = Not ranked
	Week											
Poll	Pre	1	2	3	4	5	6	7	8	9	10	Final
AP	—	—	—	—	—	—	—	16	18	16	16	17
Coaches	N/A	N/A	N/A	N/A	N/A	N/A	N/A	N/A	N/A	N/A	20	

== After the season ==
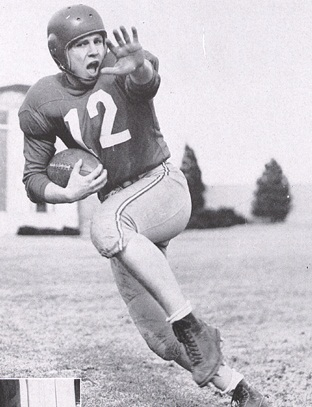
Bobby Reynolds (pictured) became known as Mr. Touchdown after winning an RCA contest organized as part of its promotion of "Mr. Touchdown, U.S.A."

Coach Glassford's second season was a resounding success, as Nebraska end its brutal nine-season losing skid, and notched high-profile wins against Penn State and Minnesota in the process. The season-ending loss to national champion Oklahoma could be tolerated, leaving just the one letdown loss to Colorado to truly mar the season, though the positive turnaround of fortunes was so dramatic that few would complain. Nebraska ended the season ranked in the AP Poll for the first time in ten years. Coach Glassford's conference record improved to 7–5–0 (.583), as his overall record climbed to 10–7–1 (.583). The Cornhusker football program's overall record improved to 326–155–32 (.667), though the conference record declined slightly to 127–42–11 (.736).

During the 1950 football season, in order to promote the debut of its new song "Mr. Touchdown, U.S.A.," RCA offered a prize of a television set and a silver-plated album to the college football player who scored the most touchdowns during the 1950 football season. As part of the promotion, albums of "Mr. Touchdown, U.S.A." were sent to sports reporters at American newspapers. Bobby Reynolds of Nebraska ultimately claimed the prize, which was presented to him in February 1951 by Hugo Winterhalter, the first performer of the song. Reynolds, who became best known among Nebraska fans during his legendary 1950 season, has since been described as Mr. Touchdown.

== Future NFL and other professional league players ==
- Nick Adduci, Washington Redskins
- Ed Husmann, 1953 9th-round pick of the Chicago Cardinals
- Bobby Reynolds, 1953 7th-round pick of the Los Angeles Rams
