= Walt Yowarsky =

American football player and coach (1928–2014)

No. 85, 86, 58, 78, 50
- Positions: Defensive end, center, tackle

Personal information
- Born: May 10, 1928; Cleveland, Ohio, U.S.
- Died: November 30, 2014 (aged 86); Chattanooga, Tennessee, U.S.
- Listed height: 6 ft 2 in (1.88 m)
- Listed weight: 234 lb (106 kg)

Career information
- High school: Lincoln (Cleveland)
- College: Kentucky (1947–1950)
- NFL draft: 1951: 3rd round, 29th overall pick

Career history

Playing
- Washington Redskins (1951, 1954); Detroit Lions (1955); New York Giants (1955–1957); San Francisco 49ers (1958)

Coaching
- New York Giants (1959–1960) Assistant coach; Minnesota Vikings (1961–1966) Offensive line coach; New Orleans Saints (1967–1968) Offensive line coach; Atlanta Falcons (1969–1970) Defensive backs coach; Houston Oilers (1971) Defensive line coach; San Diego Chargers (1972–1973) Assistant coach

Operations
- Dallas Cowboys (1977–2000) Scout

Awards and highlights
- 3× Super Bowl champion (XXVII, XXVIII, XXX); NFL champion (1956); Sugar Bowl MVP (1951)

Career NFL statistics
- Games played: 65
- Games started: 51
- Fumble recoveries: 5
- Stats at Pro Football Reference

Walter Robert Yowarsky (May 10, 1928 – November 30, 2014) was an American professional football defensive end, offensive lineman, coach, and scout in the National Football League (NFL) for 50 years.

== Early life ==
Yowarsky was born in Cleveland, Ohio, to Michael and Anna Yowarsky. He attended and played high school football at Lincoln High School.

He was also a well-known high school baseball player and was drafted by the Cincinnati Reds after high school but decided pursue football instead.

== College career ==
Yowarsky attended and played college football at the University of Kentucky under head coach Bear Bryant. During his tenure, the Kentucky Wildcats won their first league championship in football (1950), and went to two bowl games, winning the Sugar Bowl.

The Wildcats appeared in the 1951 Sugar Bowl against the #1 ranked Oklahoma Sooners. Yowarsky, despite having played less than five minutes of defense all season, took the field as a third defensive tackle in that game, alongside Outland Trophy winner Bob Gain. Yowarsky recovered a fumble at the Oklahoma 22-yard line, leading to Kentucky's first score on the next play. In the third quarter Oklahoma had the ball at the Kentucky three-yard line and Yowarsky tackled Billy Vessels (future Heisman Trophy winner) for a five-yard loss, after which the Sooners were stopped on downs and Kentucky took possession. In the fourth quarter Yowarsky recovered a fumbled punt. Kentucky won the game 13–7, ending the Sooners' 33-game winning streak and Yowarsky was named the game's MVP. Kentucky's victory over the nation's #1 ranked team in the bowl game led to an officially recognized national championship.

== Professional career ==
Yowarsky was selected in third round (29th overall) of the 1951 NFL draft by the Washington Redskins. He played until midway through the 1952 season when he entered the Air Force. He returned in 1954 and played in 11 games with 10 starts. On January 28, 1955, he was traded to the Detroit Lions, along with Jim Ricca, in exchange for LaVern Torgeson and Jim Hill. However, he only played two games for the Lions, before being released on October 3.

On October 5, 1955, he was claimed off waivers by the New York Giants, where he played until 1957. He was the starting defensive end for the Giants during their 1956 NFL Championship Game win over the Chicago Bears. Yowarsky was then traded to the San Francisco 49ers in 1958, where he finished his career.

== Coaching and scouting career ==
=== Coaching ===
After retiring from football, Yowarsky became an assistant coach and scout with the Giants from 1959 to 1960. He then became the offensive line coach for the Minnesota Vikings in head coach Norm Van Brocklin in 1961 (their inaugural season in the NFL) through 1966.

In 1967, he left the Vikings organization to become offensive line coach for the New Orleans Saints, who were also playing their inaugural season in the NFL. Yowarsky resigned the position at the end of the 1968 season, along with three other assistant coaches; Jack Faulkner, George Dickson, and Bob Shaw.

In 1969, Yowarsky accepted a position as the defensive backs coach for the Atlanta Falcons, under his former colleague Van Brocklin. He coached there until 1970. In 1971, he resigned from the Falcons and accepted a defensive line coaching position with the Houston Oilers. He finished his coaching career with the San Diego Chargers from 1972 to 1973.

=== Scouting ===
After retiring from coaching, Yowarsky became a scout with the QUADRA Scouting Combine in 1974. He was hired as an area scout in the southeast by the Dallas Cowboys in 1977, a post that he would hold for 23 years. During that span, the Cowboys won three Super Bowls. He was one of the most vocal supporters in the Cowboys organization for drafting Emmitt Smith, who would go on to become the all-time rushing leader in NFL history.

== Personal life ==
Yowarsky was married to his wife, Bobbie, for 58 years, and they had three children. He served in the United States Air Force, attaining the rank of first lieutenant. Yowarsky died on November 30, 2014, in Chattanooga, Tennessee.
