= Kentucky–Tennessee football rivalry =

American college football rivalry

- Kentucky Wildcats Tennessee Volunteers
- Sport: Football
- First meeting: October 21, 1893; Kentucky, 56–0
- Latest meeting: November 7, 2026; Tennessee, 34–6
- Next meeting: 2027
- Trophy: Beer Barrel (1925–1999)

Statistics
- Total meetings: 122
- All-time series: Tennessee leads, 86–26–9
- Largest victory: Kentucky, 56–0 (1893)
- Longest win streak: Tennessee, 26 (1985–2010)
- Current win streak: Tennessee, 6 (2021–present)

Locations of Kentucky and Tennessee

The Kentucky–Tennessee football rivalry is an American college football rivalry between the Kentucky Wildcats and Tennessee Volunteers. The border rivals have faced off on the gridiron since 1893, making it one of the oldest series in major college football. It was close in the early years, with Kentucky holding a series lead after the first 22 match-ups, but since the early 1930s, Tennessee has dominated the cross-border rivalry. Even-yeared games are played in Knoxville, and odd-yeared games are played in Lexington. The game has never been contested in any other location.

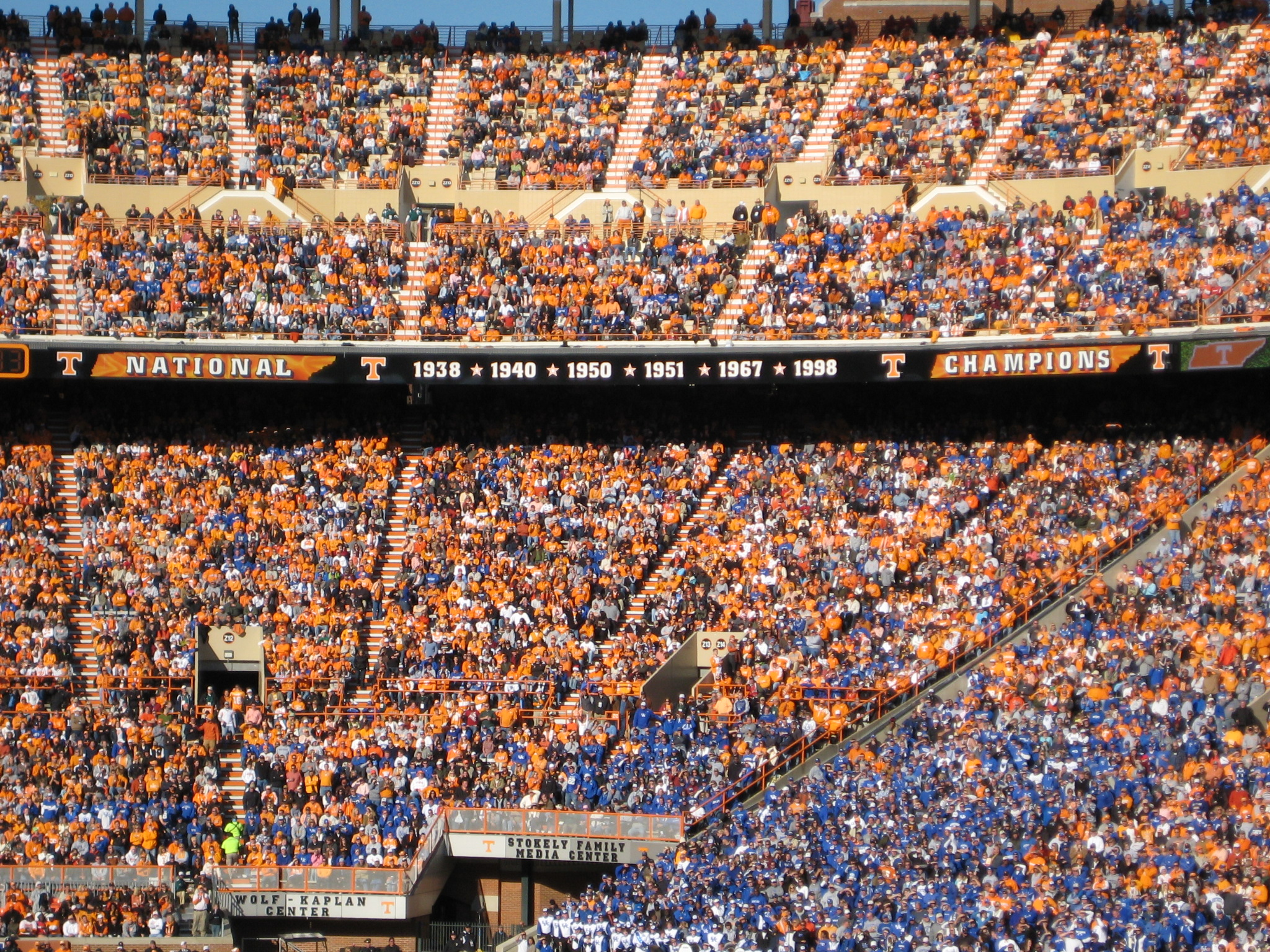
Tennessee fans and Kentucky fans in the stands for the 2010 game.

Both schools were charter members of the Southeastern Conference when it was established in 1932. Since that season, Tennessee has a 75–16–3 record against Kentucky, including a streak of 26 straight victories from 1985 to 2010, which is one of the longest such streaks in NCAA history. The Wildcats did not win any games against the Volunteers during the 1940s, 1990s, or 2000s. The only decade of the SEC era in which UK posted a winning record against Tennessee was the 1950s, when they went 6–3–1. The series was not without disappointment even during that period for Kentucky fans, however, as the Vols dealt Bear Bryant's 1950 Wildcat squad its only defeat during its school-best 11–1 season.

== The Barrel ==
=== History of the trophy ===
The Kentucky–Tennessee game once involved a trophy: a wooden beer barrel painted half blue and half orange which was awarded to the winner of the game every year from 1925 to 1997. The Barrel was introduced in 1925 by a group of former Kentucky students who wanted to create a material sign of their school's supremacy in the rivalry. It was rolled onto the field that year with the words "Ice Water" painted on it to avoid any outcries over an alcohol drum symbolizing a college rivalry during the Prohibition era.

While the trophy was ceremonially awarded to the game's winner each year, it took some unauthorized trips over the years. Tennessee lost to Kentucky in 1953, but several orange-clad students "keg-napped" the barrel and kept it hidden in Knoxville until UK students retaliated by "dog-napping" Smokey. The barrel theft set in motion a series of additional pranks over the next few years between students of the two schools, but the barrel was not involved.

Vanderbilt University students stole the keg from Kentucky in 1960 to rally support from cross-state UT students in an upcoming basketball game against Kentucky. The Commodores lost the game and returned the trophy months later.

=== End of the Barrel era ===
A fatal alcohol-related car crash involving two UK football players a week before the 1998 contest prompted the end of the barrel exchange. Kentucky athletic director C. M. Newton expressed the idea that the ongoing use of an alcohol container as a trophy would be inappropriate under the circumstances. The ceremony was cancelled for the 1998 game, and the two schools mutually agreed to permanently discontinue the tradition before the 1999 game.

The actual barrel was in UT's possession when the schools ended the exchange, but its current whereabouts have not been made public. It has not been displayed since 1997, and it was not transferred to Kentucky when the Wildcats broke the Volunteers' long series winning streak in 2011. On November 12, 2019, Tennessee's tight ends coach Brian Niedermeyer posted a photo of the barrel on Twitter.

== Game results ==
Kentucky victories	Tennessee victories	Tie games	Vacated win

No.	Date	Location	Winning team		Losing team	
1	October 21, 1893	Knoxville, TN	Kentucky	56	Tennessee	0
2	November 4, 1899	Knoxville, TN	Tennessee	12	Kentucky	0
3	November 23, 1901	Knoxville, TN	Tennessee	5	Kentucky	0
4	November 10, 1906	Lexington, KY	Kentucky	21	Tennessee	0
5	November 9, 1907	Knoxville, TN	Tie	0	Tie	0
6	October 17, 1908	Knoxville, TN	Tennessee	7	Kentucky	0
7	October 16, 1909	Lexington, KY	Kentucky	17	Tennessee	0
8	November 5, 1910	Knoxville, TN	Kentucky	10	Tennessee	0
9	November 30, 1911	Lexington, KY	Kentucky	12	Tennessee	0
10	November 16, 1912	Knoxville, TN	Kentucky	13	Tennessee	6
11	November 27, 1913	Lexington, KY	Tennessee	13	Kentucky	7
12	November 26, 1914	Knoxville, TN	Tennessee	23	Kentucky	6
13	November 25, 1915	Lexington, KY	Kentucky	6	Tennessee	0
14	November 30, 1916	Knoxville, TN	Tie	0	Tie	0
15	November 27, 1919	Lexington, KY	Kentucky	13	Tennessee	0
16	November 25, 1920	Knoxville, TN	Tennessee	14	Kentucky	7
17	November 24, 1921	Lexington, KY	Tie	0	Tie	0
18	November 30, 1922	Knoxville, TN	Tennessee	14	Kentucky	7
19	November 29, 1923	Lexington, KY	Tennessee	18	Kentucky	0
20	November 27, 1924	Knoxville, TN	Kentucky	27	Tennessee	6
21	November 26, 1925	Lexington, KY	Kentucky	23	Tennessee	20
22	November 25, 1926	Knoxville, TN	Tennessee	6	Kentucky	0
23	November 24, 1927	Lexington, KY	Tennessee	20	Kentucky	0
24	November 29, 1928	Knoxville, TN	Tie	0	Tie	0
25	November 28, 1929	Lexington, KY	Tie	6	Tie	6
26	November 27, 1930	Knoxville, TN	Tennessee	8	Kentucky	0
27	November 26, 1931	Lexington, KY	Tie	6	Tie	6
28	November 24, 1932	Knoxville, TN	Tennessee	26	Kentucky	0
29	November 30, 1933	Lexington, KY	Tennessee	27	Kentucky	0
30	November 29, 1934	Knoxville, TN	Tennessee	19	Kentucky	0
31	November 28, 1935	Lexington, KY	Kentucky	27	Tennessee	0
32	November 26, 1936	Knoxville, TN	#17 Tennessee	7	Kentucky	6
33	November 25, 1937	Lexington, KY	Tennessee	13	Kentucky	0
34	November 24, 1938	Knoxville, TN	Tennessee	46	Kentucky	0
35	November 30, 1939	Lexington, KY	#4 Tennessee	19	Kentucky	0
36	November 23, 1940	Knoxville, TN	#6 Tennessee	33	Kentucky	0
37	November 22, 1941	Lexington, KY	Tennessee	20	Kentucky	7
38	November 21, 1942	Knoxville, TN	#11 Tennessee	26	Kentucky	0
39	September 30, 1944	Knoxville, TN	Tennessee	26	Kentucky	13
40	November 25, 1944	Lexington, KY	#15 Tennessee	21	Kentucky	7
41	November 24, 1945	Lexington, KY	#14 Tennessee	14	Kentucky	0
42	November 23, 1946	Knoxville, TN	#7 Tennessee	7	Kentucky	0
43	November 22, 1947	Lexington, KY	Tennessee	13	Kentucky	7
44	November 20, 1948	Knoxville, TN	Tie	0	Tie	0
45	November 19, 1949	Lexington, KY	Tennessee	6	#11 Kentucky	0
46	November 25, 1950	Knoxville, TN	#9 Tennessee	7	#3 Kentucky	0
47	November 24, 1951	Lexington, KY	#1 Tennessee	28	#9 Kentucky	0
48	November 22, 1952	Knoxville, TN	Tie	14	Tie	14
49	November 21, 1953	Lexington, KY	#13 Kentucky	27	Tennessee	21
50	November 20, 1954	Knoxville, TN	Kentucky	14	Tennessee	13
51	November 19, 1955	Lexington, KY	Kentucky	23	#17 Tennessee	0
52	November 24, 1956	Knoxville, TN	#2 Tennessee	20	Kentucky	7
53	November 23, 1957	Lexington, KY	Kentucky	20	#12 Tennessee	6
54	November 22, 1958	Knoxville, TN	Kentucky	6	Tennessee	2
55	November 21, 1959	Lexington, KY	Kentucky	20	#20 Tennessee	0
56	November 19, 1960	Knoxville, TN	Tie	10	Tie	10
57	November 25, 1961	Lexington, KY	Tennessee	26	Kentucky	16
58	November 24, 1962	Knoxville, TN	Kentucky	12	Tennessee	10
59	November 23, 1963	Lexington, KY	Tennessee	19	Kentucky	0
60	November 21, 1964	Knoxville, TN	Kentucky	12	Tennessee	7
61	November 20, 1965	Lexington, KY	Tennessee	19	Kentucky	3
62	November 19, 1966	Knoxville, TN	Tennessee	28	Kentucky	19

No.	Date	Location	Winning team		Losing team	
63	November 25, 1967	Lexington, KY	#2 Tennessee	17	Kentucky	7
64	November 23, 1968	Knoxville, TN	#8 Tennessee	24	Kentucky	7
65	November 22, 1969	Lexington, KY	#9 Tennessee	31	Kentucky	26
66	November 21, 1970	Knoxville, TN	#8 Tennessee	45	Kentucky	0
67	November 20, 1971	Lexington, KY	#11 Tennessee	21	Kentucky	7
68	November 25, 1972	Knoxville, TN	#12 Tennessee	17	Kentucky	7
69	November 24, 1973	Lexington, KY	Tennessee	16	Kentucky	14
70	November 23, 1974	Knoxville, TN	Tennessee	24	Kentucky	7
71	November 22, 1975	Lexington, KY	Tennessee	17	Kentucky	13
72	November 20, 1976	Knoxville, TN	Kentucky	7	Tennessee	0
73	November 19, 1977	Lexington, KY	#7 Kentucky	21	Tennessee	17
74	November 25, 1978	Knoxville, TN	Tennessee	29	Kentucky	14
75	November 24, 1979	Lexington, KY	Tennessee	20	Kentucky	17
76	November 22, 1980	Knoxville, TN	Tennessee	45	Kentucky	14
77	November 21, 1981	Lexington, KY	Kentucky	21	Tennessee	10
78	November 20, 1982	Knoxville, TN	Tennessee	28	Kentucky	7
79	November 19, 1983	Lexington, KY	Tennessee	10	Kentucky	0
80	November 24, 1984	Knoxville, TN	Kentucky	17	Tennessee	12
81	November 23, 1985	Lexington, KY	Tennessee	42	Kentucky	0
82	November 22, 1986	Knoxville, TN	Tennessee	28	Kentucky	9
83	November 21, 1987	Lexington, KY	#15 Tennessee	24	Kentucky	22
84	November 19, 1988	Knoxville, TN	Tennessee	28	Kentucky	24
85	November 25, 1989	Lexington, KY	#8 Tennessee	31	Kentucky	10
86	November 24, 1990	Knoxville, TN	#14 Tennessee	42	Kentucky	28
87	November 23, 1991	Lexington, KY	#10 Tennessee	16	Kentucky	7
88	November 21, 1992	Knoxville, TN	#20 Tennessee	34	Kentucky	13
89	November 20, 1993	Lexington, KY	#7 Tennessee	48	Kentucky	0
90	November 19, 1994	Knoxville, TN	Tennessee	52	Kentucky	0
91	November 18, 1995	Lexington, KY	#4 Tennessee	34	Kentucky	31
92	November 23, 1996	Knoxville, TN	#9 Tennessee	56	Kentucky	10
93	November 22, 1997	Lexington, KY	#5 Tennessee	59	Kentucky	31
94	November 21, 1998	Knoxville, TN	#1 Tennessee	59	Kentucky	21
95	November 20, 1999	Lexington, KY	#7 Tennessee	56	Kentucky	21
96	November 18, 2000	Knoxville, TN	Tennessee	59	Kentucky	20
97	November 17, 2001	Lexington, KY	#6 Tennessee	38	Kentucky	35
98	November 30, 2002	Knoxville, TN	Tennessee	24	Kentucky	0
99	November 29, 2003	Lexington, KY	#7 Tennessee	20	Kentucky	7
100	November 27, 2004	Knoxville, TN	#15 Tennessee	37	Kentucky	31
101	November 26, 2005	Lexington, KY	Tennessee	27	Kentucky	8
102	November 25, 2006	Knoxville, TN	#19 Tennessee	17	Kentucky	12
103	November 24, 2007	Lexington, KY	#19 Tennessee	52	Kentucky	50^{4OT}
104	November 29, 2008	Knoxville, TN	Tennessee	28	Kentucky	10
105	November 28, 2009	Lexington, KY	Tennessee	30	Kentucky	24^{OT}
106	November 27, 2010	Knoxville, TN	Tennessee	24	Kentucky	14
107	November 26, 2011	Lexington, KY	Kentucky	10	Tennessee	7
108	November 24, 2012	Knoxville, TN	Tennessee	37	Kentucky	17
109	November 30, 2013	Lexington, KY	Tennessee	27	Kentucky	14
110	November 15, 2014	Knoxville, TN	Tennessee	50	Kentucky	16
111	October 31, 2015	Lexington, KY	Tennessee	52	Kentucky	21
112	November 12, 2016	Knoxville, TN	Tennessee	49	Kentucky	36
113	October 28, 2017	Lexington, KY	Kentucky	29	Tennessee	26
114	November 10, 2018	Knoxville, TN	Tennessee	24	#12 Kentucky	7
115	November 9, 2019	Lexington, KY	Tennessee^{*}	17	Kentucky	13
116	October 17, 2020	Knoxville, TN	Kentucky	34	#18 Tennessee	7
117	November 6, 2021	Lexington, KY	Tennessee	45	#18 Kentucky	42
118	October 29, 2022	Knoxville, TN	#3 Tennessee	44	#19 Kentucky	6
119	October 28, 2023	Lexington, KY	#21 Tennessee	33	Kentucky	27
120	November 2, 2024	Knoxville, TN	#7 Tennessee	28	Kentucky	18
121	October 25, 2025	Lexington, KY	#17 Tennessee	56	Kentucky	34
122	November 7, 2026	Knoxville, TN	#13 Tennessee	34	#6 Kentucky	6
Series: Tennessee leads 86–26–9
* Tennessee vacated the 2019 win due to recruiting violations under former head coach Jeremy Pruitt.

== Notable games ==
- 1950: The Vols handed #3 Kentucky, coached by Bear Bryant, its only loss, 7–0. Tennessee went on and defeated #2 Texas in the Cotton Bowl Classic 20–14 en route to an 11–1 record, and Kentucky defeated #1 Oklahoma 13–7 in the 1951 Sugar Bowl, while also finishing 11–1.

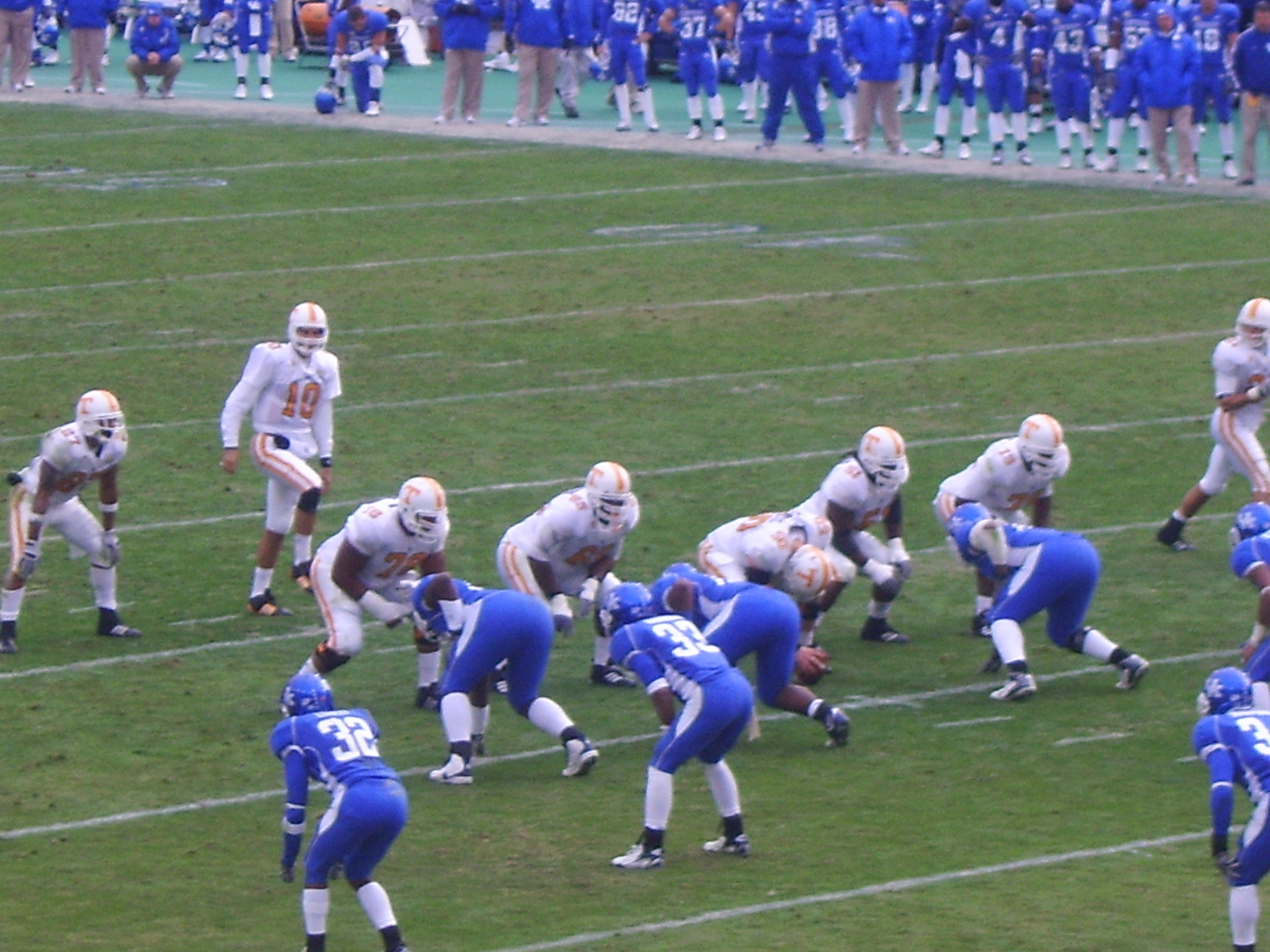
The 2007 game between the 2 teams.

- 1963: This game was one out of 6 that were not canceled or postponed due to the assassination of President John F. Kennedy the day before. It went ahead as scheduled. Tennessee shut Kentucky out 19–0.
- 2007: Tennessee came to Lexington looking to clinch the SEC East and a trip to Atlanta after a strong victory over Georgia and after Florida stumbled midway through the season. Kentucky came in with one of its strongest teams in years behind star QB Andre Woodson and a huge upset over then-ranked No. 1 LSU now looking to end the 22-game losing streak to the Volunteers. The game was a fierce, nail-biting, overtime thriller as Woodson fought to end Kentucky's misery against Tennessee. In the second overtime Tennessee failed to score, giving Kentucky a chance to finally end the streak, but the Cats' field goal attempt was blocked. With the score at 44–44 an unsportsmanlike penalty on UT RB Arian Foster forced Tennessee to start the fourth overtime from the UK 40-yard line, but it was rendered moot as QB Erik Ainge hit WR Quintin Hancock with a touchdown strike on the first play. Tennessee would then make the two-point conversion. On Kentucky's possession RB Derrick Locke scored from three yards out to bring Kentucky within a two-point conversion to keep the game alive. Woodson kept the ball himself on the try, but was stopped from behind short of the goal line for the Volunteer victory. As a result, Tennessee and Georgia finished their seasons with identical 6–2 records to lead the SEC East, but the Vols would move on to the SEC title game by virtue of the head-to-head tiebreaker over the Bulldogs. Tennessee would then lose the following week to the eventual two-loss national champion LSU.
- 2008: In the final game for Tennessee's head coach Phillip Fulmer. Fulmer finished his career off with his final victory over the Wildcats, 28–10, leaving Kentucky winless against him.
- 2009: Tennessee and Kentucky went to overtime once again after another nail-biting game ends tied at 24–24 in regulation. Kentucky relied on star receiver Randall Cobb for most of the game, however Cobb was ineffective on the Wildcats' first possession in overtime only taking one wildcat formation snap. After a three-and-out the ensuing field goal missed wide left. On the Vols' ensuing possession, RB Montario Hardesty broke off a 20-yard run for the game-winning touchdown in Lane Kiffin's lone victory against the Wildcats.
- 2011: After losing 26 straight games to Tennessee the Wildcats finally notched a 10–7 victory against the Volunteers behind the play of wide receiver Matt Roark who was forced to play under center as both quarterbacks, Maxwell Smith and Morgan Newton, were out with injuries. The loss is often regarded as one of the most embarrassing to Vol fans and one of the many black marks in the Derek Dooley era. Dooley himself took the blame for the loss in an interview with Clay Travis in 2016, saying the team just wasn't ready to perform.
- 2020: Kentucky ended a 17-game road losing streak in Neyland Stadium with a dominant 34–7 win over the Volunteers. Kentucky's defense had 2 interceptions returned for touchdowns in the game. This was the Wildcats first win in Knoxville since 1984, Kentucky's largest victory over Tennessee in the series since 1935, and the Wildcats' largest victory over the Volunteers in Knoxville since 1924. Mark Stoops became the first Kentucky coach to beat Tennessee in both Lexington and Knoxville since Fran Curci. The loss was one of several that contributed to the downfall of Tennessee coach Jeremy Pruitt, who that following January would be ousted from the program following an NCAA investigation into improper benefits to players.

== See also ==
- List of NCAA college football rivalry games
- List of most-played college football series in NCAA Division I
