= Tom Catlin =

American football player and coach (1931–2008)

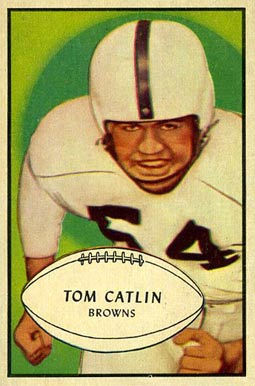
- Catlin on a 1953 Bowman football card

No. 50, 65, 54, 63
- Positions: Linebacker, center

Personal information
- Born: September 8, 1931; Ponca City, Oklahoma, U.S.
- Died: June 7, 2008 (aged 76); Seattle, Washington, U.S.
- Listed height: 6 ft 1 in (1.85 m)
- Listed weight: 213 lb (97 kg)

Career information
- High school: Ponca City
- College: Oklahoma (1949–1952)
- NFL draft: 1953: 4th round, 39th overall pick

Career history

Playing
- Cleveland Browns (1953–1954, 1957–1958); Philadelphia Eagles (1959)

Coaching
- Dallas Texans (1960) Defensive line coach; Dallas Texans (1961–1962) Linebackers coach; Kansas City Chiefs (1963–1964) Linebackers coach; Kansas City Chiefs (1965) Defensive backs coach; Los Angeles Rams (1966–1969) Defensive backs coach; Los Angeles Rams (1970–1977) Linebackers coach; Buffalo Bills (1978–1982) Defensive coordinator; Seattle Seahawks (1983–1992) Defensive coordinator; Seattle Seahawks (1992-1995) Linebackers coach

Awards and highlights
- NFL champion (1954); National champion (1950); UPI Lineman of the Year (1952); Second-team All-American (1952); 2× First-team All-Big Seven (1951, 1952); Second-team All-Big Seven (1950)

Career NFL statistics
- Interceptions: 2
- Fumble recoveries: 6
- Stats at Pro Football Reference
- Coaching profile at Pro Football Reference

Thomas Allen Catlin (September 8, 1931 – June 7, 2008) was an American professional football player and coach. He spent a total of 37 years in the National Football League (NFL), including stints as defensive coordinator with the Buffalo Bills (1978–1982) and Seattle Seahawks (1983–1992). Earlier, he had been a pilot in the United States Air Force. He was born in Ponca City, Oklahoma and died in Seattle, Washington.
