= Buck McPhail =

American football player (1929–2005)

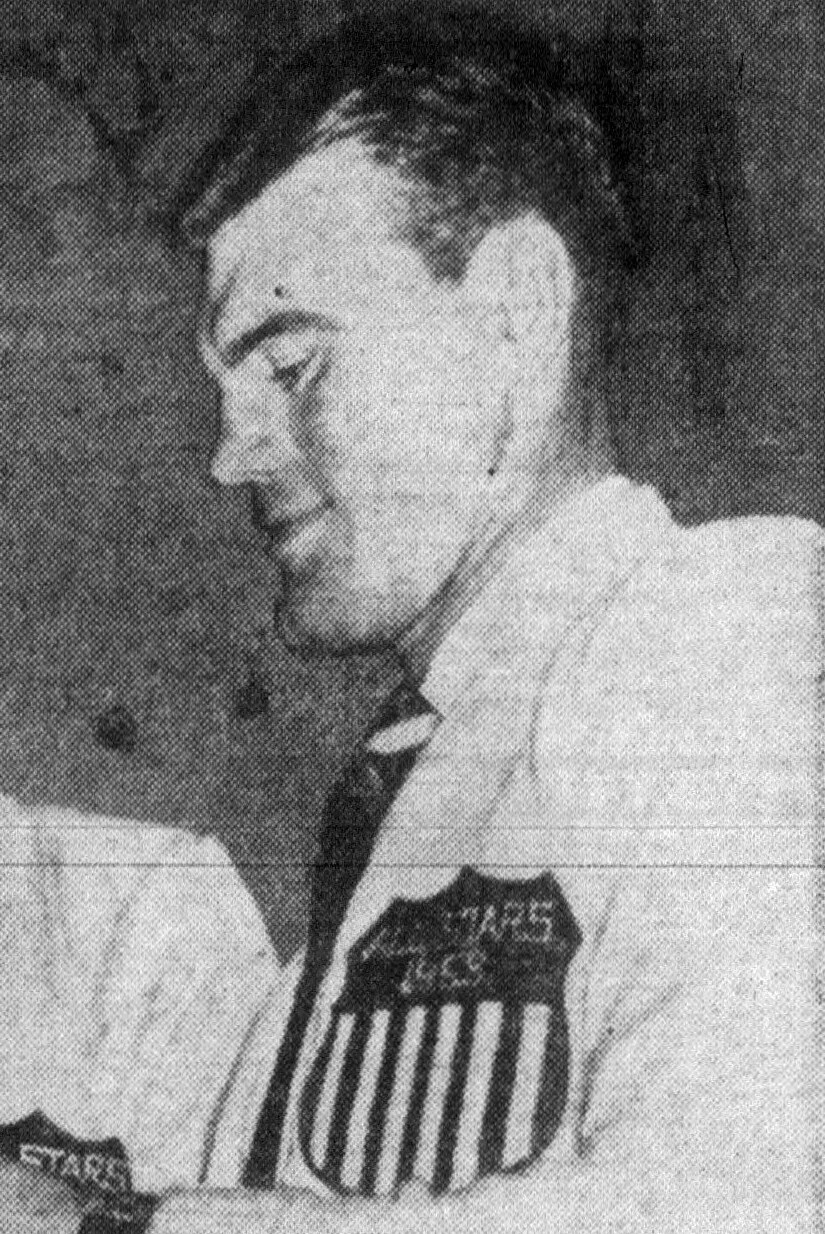
- McPhail, circa 1953

No. 31
- Positions: Fullback, placekicker

Personal information
- Born: December 25, 1929; Oklahoma City, Oklahoma, U.S.
- Died: March 4, 2005 (aged 75); Costa Mesa, California, U.S.
- Listed height: 6 ft 1 in (1.85 m)
- Listed weight: 195 lb (88 kg)

Career information
- High school: Central (Oklahoma City)
- College: Oklahoma
- NFL draft: 1953: 3rd round, 26th overall pick

Career history
- Baltimore Colts (1953)

Awards and highlights
- National champion (1950); First-team All-American (1952); 2× First-team All-Big Seven (1951, 1952)

Career NFL statistics
- Rushing yards: 138
- Rushing average: 2.6
- Receptions: 10
- Receiving yards: 38
- Stats at Pro Football Reference

Coleman "Buck" McPhail (December 25, 1929 – March 4, 2005) was an American professional football player who was a fullback and placekicker in the National Football League (NFL). McPhail played college football for the Oklahoma Sooners.

== College career ==
McPhail played fullback and punter at Oklahoma. He rushed 19 times for 102 yards as a sophomore during the Sooners' national championship season in 1950. As a junior, he rushed for 875 yards and four touchdowns and set a national record with 8.56 yards per carry and was named first-team All-Big Seven Conference. As a senior, McPhail rushed for 1,018 yards on 161 carries (6.3 yards per carry) and was named first-team All-Big Seven and an All-American by the American Football Coaches Association. McPhail also served as the lead blocker for Heisman Trophy winner Billy Vessels and the pair became the first college football backfield to have two 1,000 rushers in the same season. He also averaged 39.8 yards per punt. McPhail finished his collegiate career with 1,995 rushing yards.

== Professional career ==
McPhail was selected 26th overall by the Baltimore Colts in the third round of the 1953 NFL draft. He occasionally played running back but primarily served as the team's kicking specialist during Baltimore's inaugural season. McPhail finished the season with 138 yards on 53 carries and ten receptions for 38 yards while making two of five field goal attempts and 21 of 23 extra point attempts. McPhail was selected into the Army in 1954 and was stationed at Fort Sill, where he was a member of the base's football team and was named the most valuable player among Army football players in 1955.

== Coaching career and later life ==
After his discharge from the Army McPhail became the backfield coach at the University of California. After three seasons with the Golden Bears he joined the coaching staff at Illinois. In 1963 McPhail was interviewed to replace Bud Wilkinson as the head coach at Oklahoma, but his alma mater ultimately chose Gomer Jones. McPhail left Illinois after seven years to work for a business in Florida before moving to California in 1972 to take a job with Levi Strauss & Co. McPhail died on March 4, 2005.
