= 1951 Sugar Bowl =

American college football game

- 17th Sugar Bowl
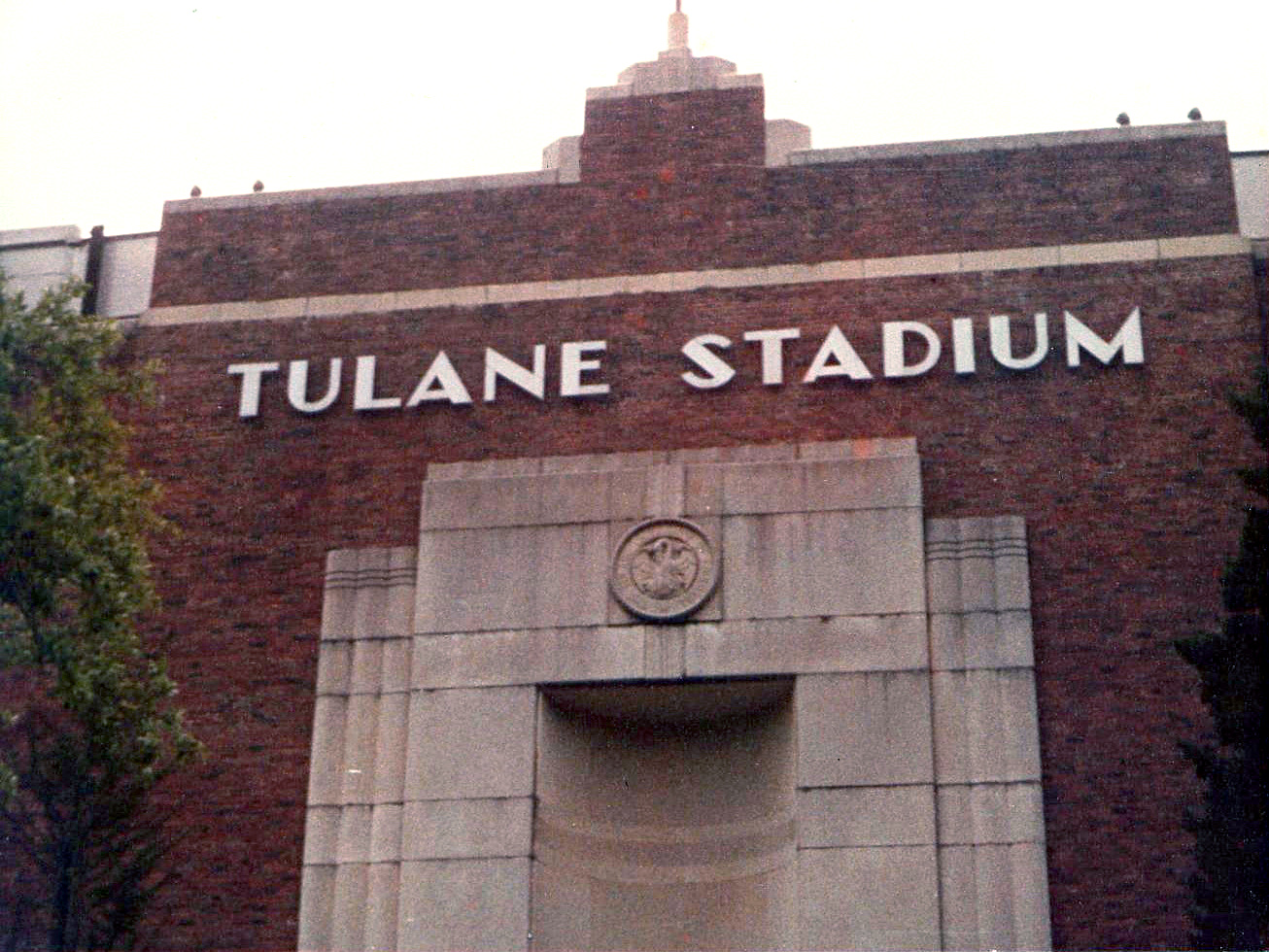
- Tulane Stadium in New Orleans, Louisiana, hosted the Sugar Bowl.
Kentucky Wildcats	Oklahoma Sooners
(10–1)	(10–0)
SEC	Big 7
13	7
Head coach: Bear Bryant	Head coach: Bud Wilkinson
AP / Coaches; 7 / 7	AP / Coaches; 1 / 1
	1	2	3	4	Total
Kentucky	7	6	0	0	13
Oklahoma	0	0	0	7	7
- Date: January 1, 1951
- Season: 1950
- Stadium: Tulane Stadium
- Location: New Orleans, Louisiana
- Favorite: Oklahoma by 6 to 7 points
- Referee: Ronald Gibbs (Big Seven; split crew: Big Seven, SEC)
- Attendance: 80,206

The 1951 Sugar Bowl was a college football bowl game played on January 1, 1951. The 17th playing of the Sugar Bowl, it was one of the 1950–51 bowl games concluding the 1950 college football season.

== Teams ==
=== Kentucky ===
Kentucky entered the bowl with a 10–1 record. The Wildcats were 5–1 in SEC play, thus winning the conference title. The Wildcats' lone loss was to Tennessee. This was the Wildcats' first appearance in a Sugar Bowl.

=== Oklahoma ===
Oklahoma entered the Sugar Bowl top-ranked with a 10–0 record, having won all 6 of their Big Seven regular season games, thus clinching the conference title. Both major polls (AP writers, UP coaches) awarded the Sooners with their first national championship at the end of the regular season. There were no post bowl polls at the time, but asked by the NCAA (who doesn't officially recognize champions in football) to retroactively apply his methods to name a champion for each year prior to the beginnings of his rankings in 1978, Jeff Sagarin named Kentucky the champion for the 1950 season. Oklahoma had a record of 2–0 in prior Sugar Bowl games, having won in 1949 and 1950.

== Game summary ==
Kentucky fielded three defensive tackles for much of the game, which caused Oklahoma quarterback Claude Arnold to hurry his handoffs and passes. One Wildcat tackle was Bob Gain, winner of the Outland Trophy that season. The third was Walt Yowarsky, who had played less than five minutes on defense during the regular season. Yowarsky recovered a fumble on the Oklahoma 22-yard line, leading to Kentucky's first score: on the next play after Yowarsky's fumble recovery, Kentucky quarterback Babe Parilli threw a touchdown pass to Wilbur Jamerson for a 7–0 lead at the end of the first quarter. In the second quarter, the Wildcats drove 81 yards for a touchdown, a run by Wilbur Jamerson, and led 13–0 at halftime.

In the third quarter, Oklahoma had the ball, first and goal on the Kentucky 3-yard line. The Wildcat defense held on first and second down; on third down Yowarsky tackled the Oklahoma ball carrier for a five-yard loss. On fourth down, the Sooners were stopped and Kentucky took possession.

In the fourth quarter, Yowarsky recovered a fumbled punt. With seven minutes left in the game, Oklahoma quarterback Billy Vessels threw a 17-yard touchdown pass to Merrill Green. Kentucky, however, retained possession of the football for the rest of the game, with the exception of one play, for a 13–7 victory. Yowarsky was named the game's Most Valuable Player.

1951 Sugar Bowl

Quarter	1	2	3	4	Total
No. 7 Kentucky	7	6	0	0	13
No. 1 Oklahoma	0	0	0	7	7

at Tulane Stadium • New Orleans, Louisiana

- Date: Monday, January 1, 1951

Game information

First quarter

- UK – Jamieson 22-yard pass from Parelli, kick (Kentucky 7–0)

Second quarter

- UK – Jamieson 1-yard rush, kick failed (Kentucky 13–0)

Third quarter
No scoring
Fourth quarter

- OKLA – Green 22-yard pass from Vessels, Jim Weatherall kick (Kentucky 13–7)

=== Statistics ===
Statistics	UK	OKLA
First downs	7	18
Plays–yards		
Rushes–yards		
Passing yards		
Passing: comp–att–int		
Time of possession		

Team	Category	Player	Statistics
Kentucky	Passing		
Kentucky	Rushing		
Kentucky	Receiving		
Oklahoma	Passing		
Oklahoma	Rushing		
Oklahoma	Receiving		
