= Frank Anderson (Canadian football) =

American gridiron football player (1928–1983)

Profile
- Position: Defensive end

Personal information
- Born: May 24, 1928; Oklahoma City, Oklahoma, U.S.
- Died: September 28, 1983 (aged 55); Edmonton, Alberta, Canada

Career information
- College: Oklahoma
- NFL draft: 1951: 11th round, 128th overall pick

Career history
- 1952–1957: Edmonton Eskimos

Awards and highlights
- 3× Grey Cup champion (1954, 1955, 1956); National champion (1950); First-team All-American (1950); First-team All-Big Seven (1950)

Frank G. Anderson (May 24, 1928 – September 28, 1983) was an American gridiron football player.

== Career ==
He played professional Canadian football with the Edmonton Eskimos and college football at the University of Oklahoma. At Oklahoma, Anderson played under head coach Bud Wilkinson. The Sooners lost only three games during Anderon's tenure, from 1947 to 1950. The Sooners won consecutive Sugar Bowls in 1949 and 1950. Anderson was named All-American in 1950.

Anderson joined fellow Sooner Claude Arnold in Edmonton for the 1952 season. Anderson played from 1952 to 1957 with the Edmonton Eskimos, during which time, he earned the nickname "Blood & Guts" for his tough on field performance.

During his time with the Eskimos, Anderson was a five-time defensive All-star. During his tenure, the Eskimos played in the 1952 Grey Cup, losing to the Toronto Argonauts. From 1954 through 1956, the Eskimos won three Grey Cups in a row; all were played against the Montreal Alouettes led by quarterback Sam Etcheverry.

== Awards and recognition ==
Anderson was inducted posthumously onto the Commonwealth Stadium Wall of Honour in October 1985, the 8th former player honored.
