= Nick Adduci =

American football player (1929–2005)

No. 44, 25
- Position: Defensive back

Personal information
- Born: July 12, 1929; Chicago, Illinois, U.S.
- Died: November 4, 2005 (aged 76); Chicago, Illinois, U.S.

Career information
- High school: Pullman Tech (IL)
- College: Nebraska

Career history

Playing
- Green Bay Packers* (1954); Washington Redskins (1954–1955)
- * Offseason or practice squad member only

Coaching
- Brother Rice HS (IL) (1958–1962)

Career statistics
- Games played: 22
- Stats at Pro Football Reference

Nicholas Frank Adduci (July 12, 1929 – November 4, 2005) was an American professional football defensive back in the National Football League (NFL) for the Washington Redskins. He played college football at the University of Nebraska.

== College career ==
Adduci earned a football scholarship to the University of Nebraska, where he played for the Cornhuskers. He was captain and team MVP of the freshman team, and earned the starting fullback role on varsity as a sophomore. Adduci led the Nebraska team in rushing, averaging 4.9 yards on 60 carries. As a junior in 1950, he ranked second on the team in rushing behind Bobby Reynolds, receiving several honorable mention All-American selections.

Adduci's senior season was interrupted when he was drafted into the Army in October 1951. He did two years of military service, playing service football while working as an Army medic. He also won the heavyweight boxing title at Fort Leonard Wood via first-round knockout. Adduci returned during the 1953 season, rejoining the team as a reserve fullback.

== Professional career ==
In July 1954, Adduci signed with the Green Bay Packers. He made the roster as a linebacker, but was released in September. Adduci was signed by the Washington Redskins later that month. He was released in September 1956.

== Post-playing career ==
Adduci served as head coach of the football program at Brother Rice High School in Chicago from 1958 to 1962, leading them to three playoff appearances. He worked as a part-time scout for the Philadelphia Eagles for many years before he was hired as a full-time scout for the Houston Oilers in 1971.

Adduci was inducted into the Roseland-Pullman Area Sports Hall of Fame in 1972.
