= Ollie Spencer =

American football player and coach (1931–1991)

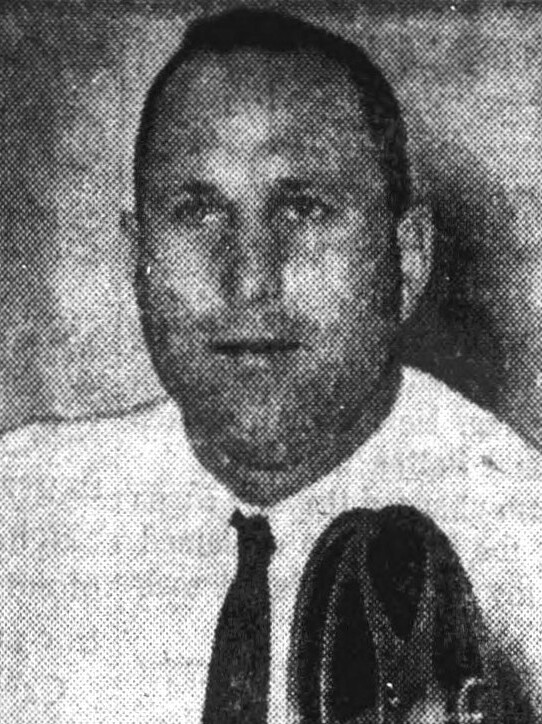
- Spencer, circa 1963

No. 78, 75, 77, 76, 73, 63
- Positions: Tackle, guard, center

Personal information
- Born: April 17, 1931; Hopewell, Kansas, U.S.
- Died: April 28, 1991 (aged 60); Danville, California, U.S.
- Listed height: 6 ft 2 in (1.88 m)
- Listed weight: 245 lb (111 kg)

Career information
- College: Kansas
- NFL draft: 1953: 6th round, 73rd overall pick

Career history

Playing
- Detroit Lions (1953, 1956); Green Bay Packers (1957–1958); Detroit Lions (1959–1961); Oakland Raiders (1963)

Coaching
- Oakland Raiders (1962–1979) Offensive line coach

Awards and highlights
- NFL champion (1953); Super Bowl champion (XI); First-team All-American (1952); Second-team All-American (1951); 2× First-team All-Big Seven (1951, 1952)

Career NFL/AFL statistics
- Games played: 99
- Games started: 81
- Fumble recoveries: 4
- Stats at Pro Football Reference

Oliver Spencer (April 17, 1931 – April 28, 1991) was an American professional football player and coach in the National Football League (NFL). He played as a tackle for eight seasons in the NFL.

== Early life ==
Spencer played at the University of Kansas as a left tackle. He soon earned conference honors as a junior and senior. He earned first-team honors as an All American in his senior season in 1952. He was named to the team's Ring of Honor.

== Professional career ==
He played his rookie season with the Detroit Lions in 1953. He then served two years in the United States Army before returning to play with the Lions in 1956. He was traded to the Green Bay Packers (1957 and 1958. He then came back to play with the Detroit Lions again in 1959, playing there for three seasons.

Spencer played initially retired from playing in 1961 to become the offensive line coach of the Oakland Raiders of the American Football League. When Al Davis became coach and GM of the Raiders in 1963, Spencer assumed that an argument he had done with Davis when he was still an assistant with the San Diego Chargers would mean Spencer would be let go. However, Davis actually encouraged Spencer to serve as player-coach for the 1963 season, as he apparently liked Spencer's attitude. Spencer played one season as player-coach before sticking to coaching, where he would coach the line for the Raiders from 1962 to 1979. Credited by guard Gene Upshaw as one who taught the lineman to "knock the guy off the line first, then move him with finesse". In his tenure, the Raiders had just two losing seasons while winning Super Bowl XI. He retired after the 1979 season.

Spencer died of a heart attack on April 28, 1991.

== See also ==
- Other American Football League players
