= 1950 All-Big Seven Conference football team =

The 1950 All-Big Seven Conference football team consists of American football players chosen by various organizations for All-Big Seven Conference teams for the 1950 college football season. The selectors for the 1950 season included the Associated Press (AP) and the United Press (UP).

== All-Big Seven selections ==
=== Backs ===
- Bill Weeks, Iowa State (AP-1; UP-1)
- Wade Stinson, Kansas (AP-1; UP-1)
- Bobby Reynolds, Nebraska (AP-1; UP-1)
- Leon Heath, Oklahoma (AP-1; UP-1)
- Claude Arnold, Oklahoma (AP-2; UP-2)
- Charlie Hoag, Kansas (AP-2; UP-2)
- Billy Vessels, Oklahoma (AP-2; UP-2)
- Merwin Hodel, Colorado (AP-2; UP-2)

=== Ends ===
- Jim Doran, Iowa State (AP-1; UP-1)
- Frank Anderson, Oklahoma (AP-1; UP-1)
- Gene Ackermann, Missouri (AP-2; UP-2)
- Chuck Mosher, Colorado (AP-2; UP-2)

=== Tackles ===
- Jim Weatherall, Oklahoma (AP-1; UP-1)
- Mike McCormack, Kansas (AP-1; UP-1)
- Pete Thompson, Colorado (AP-2)
- Bob Mullen, Nebraska (AP-2)
- Charlie Toogood, Nebraska (UP-2)
- Dean Smith, Oklahoma (UP-2)

=== Guards ===
- Norm McNabb, Oklahoma (AP-1; UP-1)
- Don Strasheim, Nebraska (AP-1; UP-2)
- John Kadlec, Missouri (AP-2; UP-1)
- Clair Mayes, Oklahoma (AP-2; UP-2)

=== Centers ===
- Harry Moore, Oklahoma (AP-1; UP-1)
- Bert Clark, Oklahoma (AP-2)
- Tom Catlin, Oklahoma (UP-2)

== Key ==
AP = Associated Press

UP = United Press

== See also ==
- 1950 College Football All-America Team
