= 1950 Kansas State Wildcats football team =

American college football season

1950 Kansas State Wildcats football
- Conference: Big Seven Conference
- Record: 1–9–1 (0–6 Big 7)
- Head coach: Ralph Graham (3rd season)
- Home stadium: Memorial Stadium

1950 Big Seven Conference football standings
	Conf.					Overall
Team	W		L		T	W		L		T
No. 1 Oklahoma $	6	–	0	–	0	10	–	1	–	0
No. 17 Nebraska	4	–	2	–	0	6	–	2	–	1
Missouri	3	–	2	–	1	4	–	5	–	1
Kansas	3	–	3	–	0	6	–	4	–	0
Iowa State	2	–	3	–	1	3	–	6	–	1
Colorado	2	–	4	–	0	5	–	4	–	1
Kansas State	0	–	6	–	0	1	–	9	–	1
$ – Conference champion; Rankings from AP Poll

The 1950 Kansas State Wildcats football team represented Kansas State University in the 1950 college football season. The team's head football coach was Ralph Graham, in his final year at the helm of the Wildcats. The Wildcats played their home games in Memorial Stadium. The Wildcats finished the season with a 1–9–1 record with a 0–6 record in conference play. They finished in last place in the Big Seven Conference. The Wildcats scored 122 points and gave up 355 points.

== Schedule ==
Date	Opponent	Site	Result	Attendance	Source
September 16	Baker*	Memorial Stadium; Manhattan, KS	W 55–0	12,300	
September 23	at Washington*	Husky Stadium; Seattle, WA	L 7–33	30,500	
September 30	at Colorado	Folsom Field; Boulder, CO (rivalry)	L 6–34	19,425	
October 7	Marquette*	Marquette Stadium; Milwaukee, WI	L 6–46		
October 14	Missouri	Memorial Stadium; Manhattan, KS	L 7–28	15,500	
October 21	at No. 2 Oklahoma	Oklahoma Memorial Stadium; Norman, OK	L 0–58	38,546	
November 4	Iowa State^{†}	Memorial Stadium; Manhattan, KS (rivalry)	L 7–13	13,342	
November 11	at No. 16 Nebraska	Memorial Stadium; Lincoln, NE (rivalry)	L 21–49	29,000	
November 19	Kansas	Memorial Stadium; Manhattan, KS (rivalry)	L 7–47	18,000	
November 25	at Oklahoma A&M*	Lewis Field; Stillwater, OK	L 0–41	5,300	
December 2	at Wichita*	Veterans Field; Wichita, KS	T 6–6	10,000	
*Non-conference game; ^{†}Homecoming; Rankings from AP Poll released prior to the game
