= Merwin Hodel =

American football player (1931–1988)

Mervin Hodel
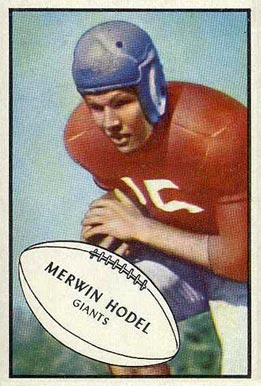
- Hodel on a 1953 Bowman football card

No. 35
- Position: Fullback

Personal information
- Born: May 27, 1931; Rockford, Illinois, U.S.
- Died: June 15, 1988 (aged 57); Denver, Colorado, U.S.
- Listed height: 6 ft 2 in (1.88 m)
- Listed weight: 205 lb (93 kg)

Career information
- High school: Rockford East
- College: Colorado
- NFL draft: 1952: 4th round, 38th overall pick

Career history
- New York Giants (1952–1953)

Awards and highlights
- Second-team All-Big Seven (1950)

Career NFL statistics
- Rushing yards: 11
- Rushing average: 2.2
- Stats at Pro Football Reference

Merwin Luther Hodel (May 27, 1931 – June 15, 1988) was an American professional football fullback who played one season with the New York Giants of the National Football League (NFL). He was selected by the Giants in the fourth round of the 1952 NFL draft after playing college football at the University of Colorado Boulder.

== Early life ==
Hodel attended Rockford West High School in Rockford, Illinois.

== College career ==
Hodel played for the Colorado Buffaloes, earning Associated Press second-team All-Big Seven honors in 1950. He rushed for 597 yards and six touchdowns on 137 attempts his senior year in 1951. He was also hurdles champion of the Big Seven Conference.

== Professional career ==
Hodel was selected by the New York Giants with the 38th pick in the fourth round of the 1952 NFL draft. He spent the 1952 off-season with the Giants before leaving the team due to a foot injury. He later signed with the Giants on October 29, 1953 and played in two games for the team during the 1953 season.
