= 1950 Colorado Buffaloes football team =

American college football season

1950 Colorado Buffaloes football
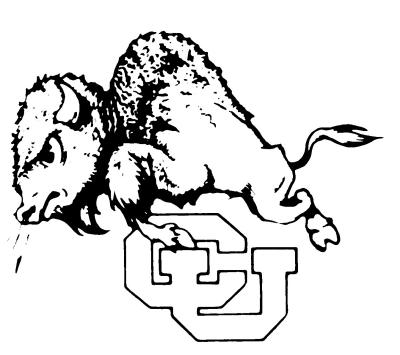
- Conference: Big Seven Conference
- Record: 5–4–1 (2–4 Big 7)
- Head coach: Dallas Ward (3rd season)
- Captain: Game captains
- Home stadium: Folsom Field

1950 Big Seven Conference football standings
	Conf.					Overall
Team	W		L		T	W		L		T
No. 1 Oklahoma $	6	–	0	–	0	10	–	1	–	0
No. 17 Nebraska	4	–	2	–	0	6	–	2	–	1
Missouri	3	–	2	–	1	4	–	5	–	1
Kansas	3	–	3	–	0	6	–	4	–	0
Iowa State	2	–	3	–	1	3	–	6	–	1
Colorado	2	–	4	–	0	5	–	4	–	1
Kansas State	0	–	6	–	0	1	–	9	–	1
$ – Conference champion; Rankings from AP Poll

The 1950 Colorado Buffaloes football team was an American football team that represented the University of Colorado as a member of the Big Seven Conference during the 1950 college football season. Led by third-year head coach Dallas Ward, the Buffaloes compiled an overall record of 5–4–1 with a mark of 2–4 in conference play, placing sixth in the Big 7.

== Schedule ==
Date	Opponent	Site	Result	Attendance	Source
September 23	at Iowa State	Clyde Williams Field; Ames, IA	L 7–14	14,000	
September 30	Kansas State	Folsom Field; Boulder, CO (rivalry)	W 34–6	19,425	
October 7	at Kansas	Memorial Stadium; Lawrence, KS	L 21–27	24,000–25,000	
October 14	Nebraska	Folsom Field; Boulder, CO (rivalry)	W 28–19	25,000	
October 21	Arizona*	Folsom Field; Boulder, CO	W 28–25	11,600–14,000	
October 28	at Utah*	Ute Stadium; Salt Lake City, UT (rivalry)	T 20–20	11,000	
November 4	No. 3 Oklahoma^{†}	Folsom Field; Boulder, CO	L 18–27	29,500	
November 11	at Missouri	Memorial Stadium; Columbia, MO	L 19–21	22,350	
November 18	Oregon*	Folsom Field; Boulder, CO	W 21–7	12,223	
November 25	at Colorado A&M*	Colorado Field; Fort Collins, CO (rivalry)	W 31–6	14,500	
*Non-conference game; ^{†}Homecoming; Rankings from AP Poll released prior to the game

== After the season ==
=== NFL draft ===
The following Buffaloes were selected in 1951 NFL draft following the season.

Round	Pick	Player	Position	NFL club
7	78	Dick Punches	Tackle	Chicago Cardinals
15	174	Vic Thomas	Tackle	Washington Redskins
