= Bob Hantla =

American gridiron football player (1931–2020)

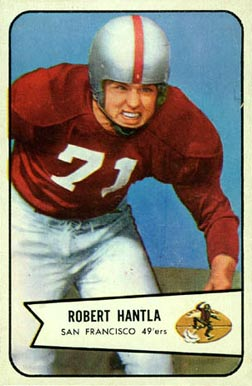
- Hantla on a 1954 Bowman football card

No. 69, 52, 54, 68
- Positions: Guard, linebacker, defensive end

Personal information
- Born: October 3, 1931; St. John, Kansas, U.S.
- Died: November 10, 2020 (aged 89); Chandler, Arizona, U.S.
- Listed height: 6 ft 1 in (1.85 m)
- Listed weight: 230 lb (104 kg)

Career information
- High school: Meade (KS)
- College: Kansas
- NFL draft: 1954: 5th round, 55th overall pick

Career history
- San Francisco 49ers (1954–1955); BC Lions (1956–1957); Winnipeg Blue Bombers 1959)

Awards and highlights
- First-team All-Big Seven (1952)

Career NFL statistics
- Games played: 24
- Games started: 2
- Stats at Pro Football Reference

Robert Dean Hantla (October 3, 1931 – November 10, 2020) was an American professional football offensive guard who played two seasons with the San Francisco 49ers of the National Football League (NFL). He was drafted by the 49ers in the fifth round of the 1954 NFL draft. He played college football at the University of Kansas. Hantla was also a member of the BC Lions and Winnipeg Blue Bombers.

== Early life ==
Hantla attended Meade High School in Meade, Kansas.

== College career ==
Hantla lettered for the Kansas Jayhawks from 1951 to 1953, earning First-team All-Big Seven Conference honors in 1952.

== Professional career ==
Hantla was selected by the San Francisco 49ers of the NFL in the fifth round with the 55th pick in the 1954 NFL draft. He played in 24 games for the 49ers from 1954 to 1955. He played in sixteen games for the BC Lions of the Western Interprovincial Football Union from 1956 to 1957. Hantla played for the Winnipeg Blue Bombers of the Canadian Football League in 1959.

== Personal life ==
Hantla's son Jeff Hantla went on to play for the Arizona Wildcats.

He died on November 10, 2020, in Chandler, Arizona at age 89.
