= Leon Heath =

American football player (1928–2007)

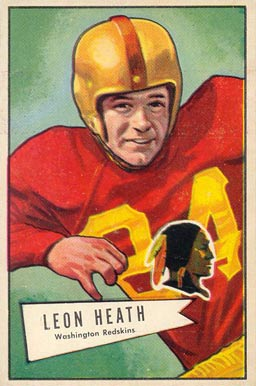
- Heath on a 1952 Bowman football card

No. 24, 32
- Positions: Fullback, halfback

Personal information
- Born: October 27, 1928; Hollis, Oklahoma, U.S.
- Died: March 23, 2007 (aged 78); Oklahoma City, Oklahoma, U.S.
- Listed height: 6 ft 1 in (1.85 m)
- Listed weight: 203 lb (92 kg)

Career information
- College: Oklahoma
- NFL draft: 1951: 1st round, 4th overall pick

Career history
- Washington Redskins (1951–1953)

Awards and highlights
- National champion (1950); Consensus All-American (1950); First-team All-Big Seven (1950)

Career NFL statistics
- Rushing yards: 813
- Rushing average: 3.5
- Receptions: 29
- Receiving yards: 194
- Total touchdowns: 7
- Stats at Pro Football Reference

Herman Leon Heath (October 27, 1928 – March 23, 2007) was an American professional football fullback in the National Football League (NFL) for the Washington Redskins. He played college football at the University of Oklahoma and was drafted in the first round (fourth overall) of the 1951 NFL draft.
