= 1952 All-Big Seven Conference football team =

The 1952 All-Big Seven Conference football team consists of American football players chosen by various organizations for All-Big Seven Conference teams for the 1952 college football season. The selectors for the 1952 season included the Associated Press (AP) and the United Press (UP). The AP selected separate offensive and defensive teams in 1952; the UP selected a single 11-man team. Players selected as first-team honorees by both the AP and UP are displayed in bold.

== All-Big Seven selections ==
=== Offense ===
==== Ends ====
- **Max Boydston**, Oklahoma (AP-1; UP-1)
- **Paul Leoni**, Kansas (AP-1; UP-1)
- Jim Jennings, Missouri (AP-2)
- Tom Evans, Colorado (AP-2)

==== Tackles ====
- Ollie Spencer, Kansas (AP-1)
- Jim Davis, Oklahoma (AP-1)
- Tom Borgschulte, Missouri (AP-2)
- Bob Klamann, Colorado (AP-2)

==== Guards ====
- Jack Lordo, Missouri (AP-1)
- Clayton Curtis, Nebraska (AP-1)
- Dick Bowman, Oklahoma (AP-2)
- Bob Castle, Missouri (AP-2)

==== Centers ====
- **Tom Catlin**, Oklahoma (AP-1; UP-1)
- Rollie Arns, Iowa St. (AP-2)

==== Backs ====
- **Eddie Crowder**, Oklahoma (AP-1; UP-1)
- **Billy Vessels**, Oklahoma (AP-1; UP-1) (1952 Heisman Trophy, College Football Hall of Fame)
- **Charlie Hoag**, Kansas (AP-1; UP-1)
- **Buck McPhail**, Oklahoma (AP-1; UP-1)
- John Bordogna, Nebraska (AP-2)
- Sack Jordan, Colorado (AP-2)
- Jim Hook, Missouri (AP-2)
- George Cifra, Nebraska (AP-2)

=== Defense ===
==== Ends ====
- Don Branby, Colorado (AP-1)
- Dennis Emanuel, Nebraska (AP-1)
- Bill Schabacker, Nebraska (AP-2)
- Bill Rowekamp, Missouri (AP-2)

==== Tackles ====
- **Jerry Minnick**, Nebraska (AP-1; UP-1)
- **Ed Rowland**, Oklahoma (AP-1; UP-1)
- Bill Byrus, Iowa St. (AP-2)
- Ed Husmann, Nebraska (AP-2)

==== Guards ====
- **Bob Hantla**, Kansas (AP-1; UP-1)
- **J. D. Roberts**, Oklahoma (AP-1; UP-1) (College Football Hall of Fame)
- Tom O'Boyle, Kansas St. (AP-2)
- Jim Martin, Missouri (AP-2)

==== Linebackers ====
- **Tom Catlin**, Oklahoma (AP-1; UP-1 [center])
- Galen Fiss, Kansas (AP-1)
- Terry Roberts, Missouri (AP-2)
- Roy Shepherd, Colorado (AP-2)

==== Backs ====
- Gil Reich, Kansas (AP-1)
- Ed Merrifield, Missouri (AP-1)
- Veryl Switzer, Kansas State (AP-1 [S])
- Verl Scott, Nebraska (AP-2)
- Tom Brookshier, Colorado (AP-2)
- Larry Grigg, Oklahoma (AP-2)

== Key ==
AP = Associated Press UP = United Press

== See also ==
- 1952 College Football All-America Team
