= 1951 All-Big Seven Conference football team =

The 1951 All-Big Seven Conference football team consists of American football players chosen by various organizations for All-Big Seven Conference teams for the 1951 college football season. The selectors for the 1951 season included the Associated Press (AP) and the United Press (UP). The AP selected separate offensive and defensive teams in 1951; the UP selected a single 11-man team. Players selected as first-team honorees by both the AP and UP are displayed in bold.

== All-Big Seven selections ==
=== Offense ===
==== Ends ====
- **Mal Schmidt**, Iowa State (AP-1; UP-1)
- Chuck Mosher, Colorado (AP-1; UP-2)
- Bill Schaake, Kansas (UP-1)
- Tice, Kansas (UP-2)

==== Tackles ====
- Art Janes, Oklahoma (AP-1)
- Ollie Spencer, Kansas (AP-1; UP-2)
- George Mrkonic, Kansas (UP-2)

==== Guards ====
- **Stan Campbell**, Iowa State (AP-1; UP-1)
- George Kennard, Kansas (AP-1; UP-2)

==== Centers ====
- **Tom Catlin**, Oklahoma (AP-1; UP-1)

==== Backs ====
- **Eddie Crowder**, Oklahoma (AP-1; UP-1)
- **Bob Brandeberry**, Kansas (AP-1; UP-1)
- **Junior Wren**, Missouri (AP-1; UP-1)
- **Buck McPhail**, Oklahoma (AP-1; UP-1)
- Woody Shelton, Colorado (UP-2)
- Charlie Hoag, Kansas (UP-2)
- Buddy Leake, Oklahoma (UP-2)
- Bud Laughlin, Kansas (UP-2)

=== Defense ===
==== Ends ====
- Don Branby, Colorado (AP-1)
- Dennis Emanuel, Nebraska (AP-1)

==== Tackles ====
- **Jack Jorgenson**, Colorado (AP-1; UP-1)
- **Jim Weatherall**, Oklahoma (AP-1; UP-1)

==== Guards ====
- Roger Nelson, Oklahoma (AP-1; UP-2)
- **Stan Campbell**, Iowa State (AP-1; UP-1)

==== Linebackers ====
- Bill Fuchs, Missouri (AP-1; UP-2)
- **Bert Clark**, Oklahoma (AP-1; UP-1 [guard])

==== Backs ====
- Tom Brookshier, Colorado (AP-1 [HB])
- John Konek, Kansas (AP-1 [HB])
- Veryl Switzer, Kansas State (AP-1 [S])

== Key ==
AP = Associated Press UP = United Press

== See also ==
- 1951 College Football All-America Team
