= Dick Bowman =

American football player and coach (1930–1983)

Biographical details
- Born: May 1, 1930
- Died: April 2, 1983 (aged 52); Edmond, Oklahoma, U.S.

Playing career
- 1951–1953: Oklahoma
- Position: Guard

Coaching career (HC unless noted)
- 1965–1970: Knox (IL)
- 1971–1973: Wabash
- 1974–1977: Army (DL)

Head coaching record
- Overall: 23–56–1

Accomplishments and honors

Awards
- Second-team All-Big Seven (1952)

Richard Lindon Bowman (May 1, 1930 – April 2, 1983) was an American football player and coach. He served as the head football coach at Knox College in Galesburg, Illinois from 1965 to 1970 and at Wabash College from 1971 to 1973, compiling a career college football record of 23–56–1.

== Playing and coaching career ==
After attending Ponca City High School in Ponca City, Oklahoma, Bowman played college football at the University of Oklahoma. Following a stint serving for the United States Army, he briefly played for the New York Giants in the National Football League (NFL), before earning a master's degree while concurrently serving as a graduate assistant coach for his alma mater, Oklahoma.

Bowman coached several high school and college football teams. He was the 27th head football coach at Wabash College in Crawfordsville, Indiana and he held that position for three seasons, from 1971 to 1973, compiling a record of 14–16.

Following his stint at Wabash, Bowman served as an assistant head coach for four years at the United States Military Academy under Homer Smith.

== Death and family ==
Bowman died in 1983 at the age of 52 from complications of pneumonia in an Edmond, Oklahoma hospital. He was survived by his parents; his wife, Mary; his son, Bill; and three daughters, Stacy, Lori, and Jenny.

== Head coaching record ==
| Year | Team | Overall | Conference | Standing | Bowl/playoffs |
|---|---|---|---|---|---|
Knox Old Siwash (Midwest Conference) (1965–1970)
| 1965 | Knox | 1–7 | 1–7 | 10th | |
| 1966 | Knox | 1–7 | 1–7 | 10th | |
| 1967 | Knox | 0–7–1 | 0–7–1 | 10th | |
| 1968 | Knox | 0–8 | 0–8 | 10th | |
| 1969 | Knox | 1–8 | 1–8 | 9th | |
| 1970 | Knox | 6–3 | 5–3 | T–3rd | |
| Knox: | | 9–40–1 | 8–40–1 | | |
Wabash Little Giants (Indiana Collegiate Conference) (1971–1973)
| 1971 | Wabash | 5–5 | 1–3 | T–5th | |
| 1972 | Wabash | 4–6 | 2–2 | 3rd | |
| 1973 | Wabash | 5–5 | 0–4 | 7th | |
| Wabash: | | 14–16 | 3–9 | | |
| Total: | | 23–56–1 | | | |
