= Stan Campbell =

American football player (1930–2005)

No. 66, 67
- Position: Guard

Personal information
- Born: August 26, 1930; Hastings, Nebraska, U.S.
- Died: March 14, 2005 (aged 74); Elgin, Illinois, U.S.
- Listed height: 6 ft 0 in (1.83 m)
- Listed weight: 226 lb (103 kg)

Career information
- High school: Rochelle Twp (Rochelle, Illinois)
- College: Iowa State
- NFL draft: 1952: 18th round, 213th overall pick

Career history
- Detroit Lions (1952–1958); Philadelphia Eagles (1959–1961); Oakland Raiders (1962)

Awards and highlights
- 3× NFL champion (1952, 1957, 1960); First-team All-Big Seven (1951)

Career NFL/AFL statistics
- Games played: 92
- Games started: 65
- Fumble recoveries: 3
- Stats at Pro Football Reference

Stanley Hugh Campbell (August 26, 1930 – March 14, 2005) was an American football player. He played college football at Iowa State College from 1949 to 1951 and professional football as an offensive guard in the National Football League (NFL) for the Detroit Lions in 1952 and from 1955 to 1958 and for the Philadelphia Eagles from 1959 to 1961 He concluded his football career with the American Football League (AFL)'s Oakland Raiders in 1962.

== Early life ==
Campbell was born in 1930 in Hastings, Nebraska. He attended Rochelle Township High School in Rochelle, Illinois, located approximately 80 miles west of Chicago.

== College career ==
Campbell enrolled at Iowa State College in 1948 and played college football for the Iowa State Cyclones football team from 1949 to 1951. In 1951, he was selected as Iowa State's captain. He was also the only player to be selected as a first-team player on both the offensive and defensive squads of the 1951 All-Big Seven Conference football team selected by the Associated Press. He was also selected to play in the 1951 East–West Shrine Game.

== Professional career ==
Campbell was selected 213th overall by the Detroit Lions in the 18th round of the 1952 NFL draft. He played on two Lions teams that won NFL championships in 1952 and 1957. In five seasons with the Lions, he appeared in 41 games. He missed the 1953 and 1954 seasons after being inducted into the military.

In September 1959, the Lions traded Campbell to the Philadelphia Eagles in exchange for a 1960 draft choice. He won a third NFL championship with the 1960 Eagles and appeared in 37 games for the Eagles from 1959 to 1961.

After being released by the Eagles in April 1962, Campbell signed with the Oakland Raiders of the American Football League. He appeared in 14 games for the Raiders during the 1962 season.

== Family and later life ==
After his football career, Campbell operated a carpet cleaning business. He and his wife, Sherry Campbell had four sons, Scott, Doug, Jeff and Chris. Doug and Scott were born on the same day Stan was in the 1960 NFL Championship game. He and his wife were later divorced. Campbell died in March 2005 at age 74 in Elgin, Illinois.

== See also ==
- Other American Football League players
