= Bill Rowekamp =

American gridiron football player (1930–2019)

Profile
- Positions: Halfback, End

Personal information
- Born: February 20, 1930; Marietta, Ohio, U.S.
- Died: September 12, 2019 (aged 89)
- Listed height: 6 ft 1 in (1.85 m)
- Listed weight: 200 lb (91 kg)

Career information
- College: Missouri
- NFL draft: 1953: 3rd round, 30th overall pick

Career history
- 1953, 1956: Edmonton Eskimos

Awards and highlights
- Grey Cup champion (1956); Second-team All-Big Seven (1952)

William Henry Rowekemp (February 20, 1930 - September 12, 2019) was an American professional football player who played for the Edmonton Eskimos. He was selected All-state in football and basketball at Marietta High School in Marietta, Ohio. He attended West Point where he played football and basketball. After his sophomore year, he transferred to the University of Missouri to complete his education. Despite being drafted in the third round by the Chicago Bears, he chose to play Canadian football where he won two Grey Cup Championships with the Edmonton Eskimos. Re-entering the Army to complete his tour of duty, he coached the 64th Artillery Division football team to a championship. He was then selected to coach the East All-Star team and won the All-Divisional Championship. In 1957, Bill came to Western Michigan University to coach football and to join the physical education staff as an instructor. He retired from coaching in 1980 and from teaching in 1990. Bill married Dorothy Joan Masters, his wife of sixty years, in 1951.
