= Jim Weatherall =

American football player (1929–1992)

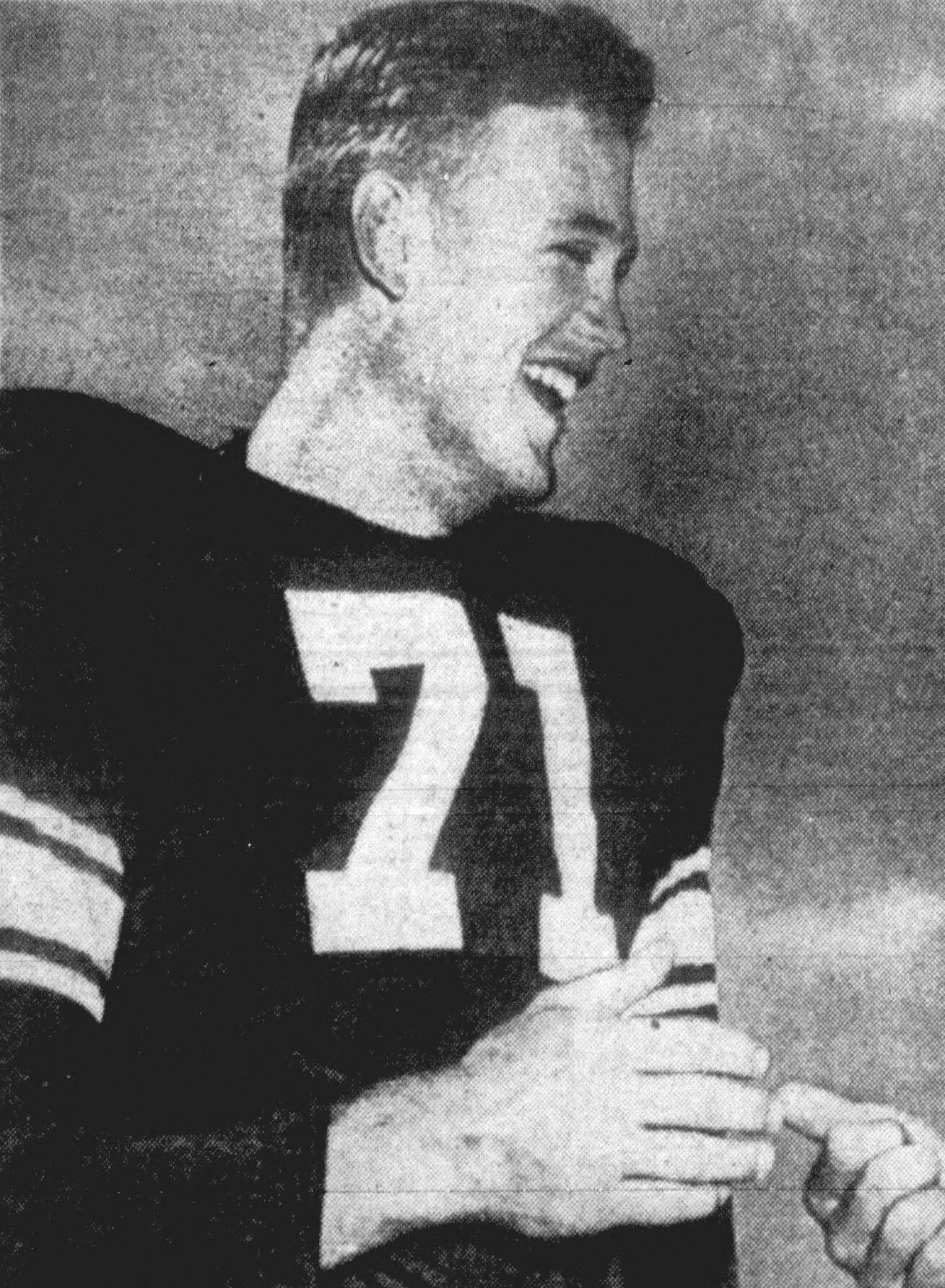
- Weatherall in 1950

No. 63, 77, 72, 74
- Positions: Defensive tackle, offensive tackle

Personal information
- Born: October 26, 1929; Graham, Oklahoma, U.S.
- Died: August 2, 1992 (aged 62); Oklahoma City, Oklahoma, U.S.
- Listed height: 6 ft 4 in (1.93 m)
- Listed weight: 245 lb (111 kg)

Career information
- High school: White Deer (White Deer, Texas)
- College: Oklahoma
- NFL draft: 1952: 2nd round, 17th overall pick

Career history
- Edmonton Eskimos (1954); Philadelphia Eagles (1955–1957); Washington Redskins (1958); Detroit Lions (1959–1960)

Awards and highlights
- Grey Cup champion (1954); Pro Bowl (1956); National champion (1950); Outland Trophy (1951); Unanimous All-American (1951); Consensus All-American (1950); 2× First-team All-Big Seven (1950, 1951)

Career NFL statistics
- Games played: 65
- Games started: 44
- Fumble recoveries: 2
- Stats at Pro Football Reference
- College Football Hall of Fame

James Preston Weatherall (October 26, 1929 – August 2, 1992) was an American professional football player who was a defensive tackle in the National Football League (NFL) for the Philadelphia Eagles, Washington Redskins, and the Detroit Lions. He also played in the Western Interprovincial Football Union (WIFU) for the Edmonton Eskimos. Weatherall played college football for the Oklahoma Sooners and was selected in the second round of the 1952 NFL draft. He was inducted into the College Football Hall of Fame in 1992.

== Early life ==
Weatherall grew up in Graham, Texas, and attended White Deer High School in White Deer, Texas.

== College career ==
Weatherall attended and played college football at the University of Oklahoma, where he was consensus All-American in 1950, unanimous All-American in 1951, and won the Outland Trophy in 1951. He lettered four years at Oklahoma and was the 1951 co-captain. Weatherall was also a placekicker and kicked 37 extra points in 1950 (fifth in the nation) and 39 in 1951 (second in the nation). During his college career, Oklahoma had a 39–4 record with a 31-game winning streak and a national championship in 1950. While at Oklahoma, Weatherall also wrestled.

He was a member of the Naval Reserve Officer Training Corps and graduated with a degree in business administration.

== Marines ==
Weatherall was in the Marines from 1952 to 1954.

== Professional career ==
Weatherall had a nine-year career in which he played in the Western Interprovincial Football Union for the Edmonton Eskimos, and in the National Football League for the Philadelphia Eagles, Washington Redskins, and the Detroit Lions.

== After football ==
After his professional career, Weatherall owned an oil-well servicing company in Oklahoma City, Oklahoma.

== Personal life ==
Weatherall had a wife, Sugar; two sons, Tracy and Clay; a daughter, Jamie; one grandson (born) Randy Clay Weatherall and one granddaughter Lacey Weatherall Andrews and a nephew.
