= 1950 Iowa State Cyclones football team =

American college football season

1950 Iowa State Cyclones football
- Conference: Big Seven Conference
- Record: 3–6–1 (2–3–1 Big 7)
- Head coach: Abe Stuber (4th season)
- Captain: Vince Beacom
- Home stadium: Clyde Williams Field

1950 Big Seven Conference football standings
	Conf.					Overall
Team	W		L		T	W		L		T
No. 1 Oklahoma $	6	–	0	–	0	10	–	1	–	0
No. 17 Nebraska	4	–	2	–	0	6	–	2	–	1
Missouri	3	–	2	–	1	4	–	5	–	1
Kansas	3	–	3	–	0	6	–	4	–	0
Iowa State	2	–	3	–	1	3	–	6	–	1
Colorado	2	–	4	–	0	5	–	4	–	1
Kansas State	0	–	6	–	0	1	–	9	–	1
$ – Conference champion; Rankings from AP Poll

The 1950 Iowa State Cyclones football team represented Iowa State College of Agricultural and Mechanic Arts (later renamed Iowa State University) in the Big Seven Conference during the 1950 college football season. In their fourth year under head coach Abe Stuber, the Cyclones compiled a 3–6–1 record (2–3–1 against conference opponents), finished in fifth place in the conference, and were outscored by their opponents by a combined total of 200 to 174. They played their home games at Clyde Williams Field in Ames, Iowa.

The team's regular starting lineup on offense consisted of left end Sy Wilhelmi, left tackle Lowell Titus, left guard Stan Campbell, center Rollie Arns, right guard Bob Matheson, right tackle John Tillo, right end Jim Doran, quarterback Bill Weeks, left halfback Melvin Meling, right halfback Mark Rothacker, and fullback Maury Schnell. Vince Beacom was the team captain.

The team's statistical leaders included Maury Schnell with 490 rushing yards, Bill Weeks with 1,552 passing yards, Jim Doran with 651 receiving yards, and Doran and Weeks with 36 points (six touchdowns) each. Two Iowa State players were selected as first-team all-conference players: Doran and Weeks.

== Schedule ==
Date	Time	Opponent	Site	Result	Attendance	Source
September 23	2:00 pm	Colorado	Clyde Williams Field; Ames, IA	W 14–7	10,739	
September 30	2:00 pm	at Northwestern*	Dyche Stadium; Evanston, IL	L 13–23	38,473	
October 7	2:00 pm	Iowa State Teachers*	Clyde Williams Field; Ames, IA	W 26–8	11,001	
October 14	2:00 pm	Kansas^{†}	Clyde Williams Field; Ames, IA	L 21–33	17,392	
October 21	2:00 pm	at Missouri	Memorial Stadium; Columbia, MO (rivalry)	T 20–20	23,101	
October 28	2:00 pm	No. 3 Oklahoma	Clyde Williams Field; Ames, IA	L 7–20	16,883	
November 4	2:00 pm	at Kansas State	Memorial Stadium; Manhattan, KS (rivalry)	W 13–7	13,342	
November 11	2:00 pm	Drake*	Clyde Williams Field; Ames, IA	L 21–35	15,519	
November 18	2:00 pm	at No. 18 Nebraska	Memorial Stadium; Lincoln, NE (rivalry)	L 13–20	37,193	
November 25	8:00 pm	at Arizona*	Arizona Stadium; Tucson, AZ	L 26–27	13,868	
*Non-conference game; ^{†}Homecoming; Rankings from AP Poll released prior to the game; All times are in Central time
