= 1950 Missouri Tigers football team =

American college football season

1950 Missouri Tigers football
- Conference: Big Seven Conference
- Record: 4–5–1 (3–2–1 Big 7)
- Head coach: Don Faurot (13th season)
- Home stadium: Memorial Stadium

1950 Big Seven Conference football standings
	Conf.					Overall
Team	W		L		T	W		L		T
No. 1 Oklahoma $	6	–	0	–	0	10	–	1	–	0
No. 17 Nebraska	4	–	2	–	0	6	–	2	–	1
Missouri	3	–	2	–	1	4	–	5	–	1
Kansas	3	–	3	–	0	6	–	4	–	0
Iowa State	2	–	3	–	1	3	–	6	–	1
Colorado	2	–	4	–	0	5	–	4	–	1
Kansas State	0	–	6	–	0	1	–	9	–	1
$ – Conference champion; Rankings from AP Poll

The 1950 Missouri Tigers football team was an American football team that represented the University of Missouri in the Big Seven Conference (Big 7) during the 1950 college football season. The team compiled a 4–5–1 record (3–2–1 against Big 7 opponents), finished in third place in the Big 7, and was outscored by all opponents by a combined total of 215 to 166. Don Faurot was the head coach for the 13th of 19 seasons. The team played its home games at Memorial Stadium in Columbia, Missouri.

The team's statistical leaders included John Glorioso with 503 rushing yards and 769 yards of total offense, Phil Klein with 625 passing yards, Gene Ackerman with 400 receiving yards, and Ed Stephens with 54 points scored.

== Schedule ==
Date	Opponent	Rank	Site	Result	Attendance	Source
September 30	Clemson*	No. 17	Memorial Stadium; Columbia, MO	L 0–34	25,000	
October 7	No. 3 SMU*		Memorial Stadium; Columbia, MO	L 0–21	35,311	
October 14	at Kansas State		Memorial Stadium; Manhattan, KS	W 28–7	15,500	
October 21	Iowa State		Memorial Stadium; Columbia, MO (rivalry)	T 20–20	23,101	
October 28	at Oklahoma A&M*		Lewis Field; Stillwater, OK	W 27–0		
November 4	at Nebraska		Memorial Stadium; Lincoln, NE (rivalry)	L 34–40	38,000	
November 11	Colorado		Memorial Stadium; Columbia, MO	W 21–19	22,350	
November 18	at No. 2 Oklahoma		Oklahoma Memorial Stadium; Norman, OK (rivalry)	L 7–41	46,463	
November 23	Kansas		Memorial Stadium; Columbia, MO (Border War)	W 20–6	18,000	
December 1	at No. 14 Miami (FL)*		Burdine Stadium; Miami, FL	L 9–27	39,623	
*Non-conference game; Rankings from AP Poll released prior to the game
