= John Amberg =

American football player (1929–2004)

No. 12
- Position: Defensive back

Personal information
- Born: March 6, 1929; Johnson County, Kansas, US
- Died: May 4, 2004 (aged 75); Torrance, California, US
- Listed height: 5 ft 11 in (1.80 m)
- Listed weight: 195 lb (88 kg)

Career information
- High school: Shawnee (KS) Mission Northwest
- College: Kansas
- NFL draft: 1951: undrafted

Career history
- New York Giants (1951–1952)
- Stats at Pro Football Reference

John McCaslin Amberg (March 6, 1929 – May 4, 2004) was an American professional football player who was a defensive back for the New York Giants of the National Football League (NFL) during the 1951 and 1952 NFL seasons. After the 1952 season, he served in the Korean War. He played college football at Kansas, where he was a team captain. He became a president of the Los Angeles Chapter of the NFL Alumni in 1997, and became a member of the organization's national board of directors in 2003. He died on May 4, 2004, at age 75.
