= Charlie Toogood =

American football player (1927–1997)

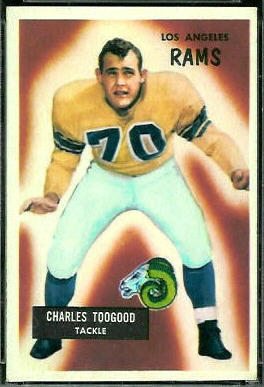
- Toogood on a 1955 Bowman football card

No. 70, 65
- Positions: Tackle, Guard

Personal information
- Born: July 16, 1927; North Platte, Nebraska, U.S.
- Died: February 22, 1997 (aged 69); Auburn, California, U.S.
- Listed height: 6 ft 0 in (1.83 m)
- Listed weight: 232 lb (105 kg)

Career information
- High school: North Platte
- College: Nebraska (1947–1950)
- NFL draft: 1951: 3rd round, 35th overall pick

Career history
- Los Angeles Rams (1951–1956); Chicago Cardinals (1957)

Awards and highlights
- NFL champion (1951); First-team All-Big Seven (1949); Second-team All-Big Seven (1950)

Career NFL statistics
- Games played: 67
- Games started: 46
- Fumble recoveries: 3
- Interceptions: 3
- Stats at Pro Football Reference

Charles Wayne Toogood (July 16, 1927 – February 22, 1997) was an American professional football defensive lineman in the National Football League (NFL). After playing college football at Nebraska, Toogood was selected by the Los Angeles Rams in the third round of the 1951 NFL draft. He played seven seasons for the Rams from 1951 to 1956 and the Chicago Cardinals in 1957.
