= George Mrkonic =

American gridiron football player (1929–2011)

No. 72, 61
- Positions: Offensive tackle, defensive tackle

Personal information
- Born: December 17, 1929; McKeesport, Pennsylvania, U.S.
- Died: May 23, 2011 (aged 81); Merriam, Kansas, U.S.
- Listed height: 6 ft 2 in (1.88 m)
- Listed weight: 225 lb (102 kg)

Career information
- High school: McKeesport
- College: Kansas (1949–1952)
- NFL draft: 1953: 4th round, 46th overall pick

Career history
- Philadelphia Eagles (1953); BC Lions (1956)

Awards and highlights
- First-team All-American (1951); Second-team All-Big Seven (1951)

Career NFL statistics
- Games played: 10
- Stats at Pro Football Reference

George Ralph Mrkonic (December 17, 1929 – May 23, 2011) was an American professional football offensive tackle in the National Football League (NFL) for the Philadelphia Eagles. He also played in the Canadian Football League (CFL) for the BC Lions.

== College career ==
Mrkonic played college football at the University of Kansas from 1950 to 1952. During that period, the Jayhawks had a 21–9 record. They finished 8–2 in 1951, the year he was selected as an All-American. Mrkonic was selected on the all-conference team in 1950 and 1951. He was also the punter for the Jayhawks, and led Kansas in punting stats in 1951.

== Professional career ==
Mrkonic was drafted in the fourth round (46th overall) in the 1953 NFL draft by the Philadelphia Eagles and played ten games with them that season. In 1956, he tried the Canadian Football League, playing only one game with the BC Lions. He later retired and moved to Shawnee Mission Kansas, where he lived with his wife Ruth. He had six grandchildren.

== Death ==
Mrkonic died in Kansas City, Kansas, the week of May 22, 2011 after a lengthy battle with cancer.
