= Wade Stinson =

American football quarterback

- Stinson, 1950

Profile
- Position: Halfback

Personal information
- Born: October 29, 1926; Randall, Kansas, U.S.
- Died: March 11, 2001; Diamondhead, Mississippi, U.S.

Career information
- College: Kansas (1948–1950)

Awards and highlights
- First-team All-Big Seven (1950)

Wade R. Stinson (born October 29, 1926; died March 11, 2001) was an American halfback for the Kansas Jayhawks football program from 1948 to 1950. During the 1950 season, he broke school rushing records for a season (1,129 yards) and in a game (239 yards) and was selected as a first-team back on the All-Big Seven Conference football team. He later served as the University of Kansas athletic director from 1964 to 1972.

== Early years and military service ==
Stinson was born in 1926 at Randall, Kansas. While serving as a first lieutenant in the Army, his right hand was shattered by the explosion of a trip-flare at Camp Robinson in Arkansas. He lost a finger in the explosion, and three other fingers were mangled. His hand became infected with gangrene, risking amputation of his arm. He underwent two years of skin, nerve and tendon grafting.

== Kansas football player ==
Stinson enrolled at the University of Kansas after leaving the Army. He did not play freshman football in 1947 and played sparingly in 1948. As a junior in 1949, He received a varsity letter as a backup player.

As a senior in 1950, Stinson ranked fifth nationally with 1,129 rushing yards and eleventh nationally with 84 points scored. He had long runs of 72 yards against Utah, 71 yards against Oklahoma, and 68 yards against Oklahoma A&M. His total of 1,129 yards was a Kansas school record until broken by Gale Sayers in 1963. He also set a single-game Kansas record with 239 rushing yards (on 24 carries) against Utah on November 4, 1950. At the end of the 1950 season, Stinson was selected by both the Associated Press and United Press as a first-team back on the 1950 All-Big Seven Conference football team.

== Kansas athletic director ==
In February 1964, Stinson was hired at age 37 to replace Dutch Lonborg as the athletic director at the University of Kansas. He held the position for eight years, resigning in November 1962. He cited a difference in philosophy, contending there was pressure on him to cheat in the recruiting of athletes. During Stinson's time as athletic director, the 1968 football team played in the 1969 Orange Bowl, and the 1970–71 men's basketball team advanced to the Final Four. He also hired

== Later life ==
Stinson later became president and chief executive officer of United Missouri Bank of St. Louis. He died in May 2001 in Diamondhead, Mississippi.
