= Billy Vessels =

American gridiron football player (1931–2001)

No. 21
- Positions: Halfback, Wide receiver, Return specialist

Personal information
- Born: March 22, 1931; Cleveland, Oklahoma, U.S.
- Died: November 17, 2001 (aged 70); Coral Gables, Florida, U.S.
- Listed height: 6 ft 0 in (1.83 m)
- Listed weight: 190 lb (86 kg)

Career information
- High school: Cleveland
- College: Oklahoma (1949–1952)
- NFL draft: 1953: 1st round, 2nd overall pick

Career history
- Edmonton Eskimos (1953); Kitchener-Waterloo Dutchmen (1954); Baltimore Colts (1956)

Awards and highlights
- Schenley Award (1953); Eddie James Memorial Trophy (1953); National champion (1950); Heisman Trophy (1952); UPI Player of the Year (1952); SN Player of the Year (1952); Consensus All-American (1952); First-team All-Big Seven (1952); Second-team All-Big Seven (1950)

Career NFL statistics
- Rushing yards: 215
- Rushing average: 4.9
- Receptions: 11
- Receiving yards: 177
- Total touchdowns: 3
- Stats at Pro Football Reference
- College Football Hall of Fame

Billy Dale Vessels (March 22, 1931 – November 17, 2001) was an American football player at the halfback position. He played college football for the Oklahoma Sooners, winning a national championship in 1950 and being awarded the Heisman Trophy in 1952.

Despite being drafted in the first round of the 1953 draft (second pick overall) by the Baltimore Colts of the National Football League (NFL), Vessels signed with the Edmonton Eskimos of the Western Interprovincial Football Union (WIFU), playing one season there and winning the inaugural award for the most outstanding player in Canada.

Vessels lost the next two years to military service, playing on the service team at Fort Sill, Oklahoma, before joining the Colts for the 1956 campaign, his only NFL season. Unhappy being relegated to a reserve role under head coach Weeb Ewbank, Vessels retired after the 1956 season to take up the construction business in Coral Gables, Florida.

== Biography ==
=== College football career ===
Billy Vessels gained prominence with the Oklahoma Sooners as a star of what was heralded as the "Phantom Backfield" together with All-American quarterback Eddie Crowder and fellow backs Buck McPhail and Buddy Leake. Vessels was instrumental in leading the team to the national championship in 1950, scoring 15 touchdowns.

During the 1952 season he rushed for 1,072 yards including seven 100-yard performances, and 17 touchdowns en route to winning the 1952 Heisman Trophy. Playing under the legendary Bud Wilkinson, he became the first of seven Sooners, followed by Steve Owens (1969), Billy Sims (1978), Jason White (2003), Sam Bradford (2008), Baker Mayfield (2017), and Kyler Murray (2018) to win the award. These achievements led to his induction into the College Football Hall of Fame in 1974.

He was also a member of the Sigma Nu fraternity at the University of Oklahoma, along with being a member of the Army Reserve Officers' Training Corps.

=== Professional football career ===
==== Edmonton Eskimos ====
Vessels was selected second overall by the Baltimore Colts in the first round of the 1953 NFL draft, but did not join the Colts following the draft, electing instead to play with the Edmonton Eskimos of the Western Interprovincial Football Union (WIFU), one of the forerunners of the Canadian Football League.

During his rookie season in 1953, Vessels led the WIFU in rushing with 926 yards gained on 129 carries (7.2 yards per carry), with eight rushing touchdowns. He also caught 20 passes for 310 yards (15.5 yards per catch) and one touchdown. The halfback Vessels also passed 30 times, completing 18 for 393 yards and 4 touchdowns, against only one interception. Defensively he snagged four interceptions from his defensive halfback position.

Vessels became the first player to win the Schenley Award as Canadian football's most outstanding player. Vessels played only one full season in Canada, seeing action for just one game with the Kitchener-Waterloo Dutchmen of the Ontario Rugby Football Union (ORFU) — who were acting as a farm team for Edmonton in 1954 — in an attempt to qualify as a non-import under rules governing at that time.

==== Fort Sill ====
This effort to establish residency for the Canadian professional leagues was interrupted when the ROTC-trained Vessels joined the US Army for a two-year stint in 1954. He spent the 1954 and 1955 fall football seasons playing for the service team at Fort Sill, Oklahoma.

==== Baltimore Colts ====
In 1956, he joined the NFL's Baltimore Colts, the team that had drafted him three years prior. Vessels was hurt for most of the preseason, suffering a muscle injury to one of his thighs in an August 6 intersquad game, an injury which he aggravated twice in subsequent weeks.

Colts' Head Coach Weeb Ewbank saw Vessels as a promising addition to the team's offensive attack but was concerned about his chronic injury problems during the preseason: "We know he was a great football player in college. We know he showed he can play and likes pro football by his season in Canada. If he stays sound, I'm sure he'll help the Colts."

Vessels made his eagerly anticipated NFL debut in the September 16 season opener against the Washington Redskins, joined by a rookie speedster out of Penn State, Lenny Moore. In front of a home crowd of 28,471, the Colts defeated the Redskins by a score of 21–13, but it was Lenny Moore who particularly shone, seemingly consigning Vessels to a backup role.

Owing to the crowded Colts backfield, coach Ewbank moved the halfback Vessels to the flanker back position, forerunner of the modern wide receiver. Vessels finished his year with 11 receptions for 177 yards (16.1 average) and a touchdown. Late in the season, injuries to other Colts running backs opened the door for Vessels to return to the backfield, with Vessels leading the team with 76 yards on the ground in a 19–17 win over the Redskins in the season finale.

He was also used as a kickoff returner, bringing back 16 kicks for 379 yards (23.7 average).

Vessels was unhappy with his role as a reserve running back under Weeb Ewbank and decided to retire from football after the 1956 season, returning home to Florida to take up the construction business. Vessels was just 26 years old at the time he left the NFL.

After his retirement, Vessels reminisced: "If I had to do it over again, I never would have signed in Canada when the Colts drafted me in 1953. That was a mistake. Edmonton was a nice place, but it didn't compare to Baltimore. Getting to know [Colts owner] Carroll Rosenbloom was one of the great experiences of my life. I wish I could have contributed more to the team."

=== Life after football ===
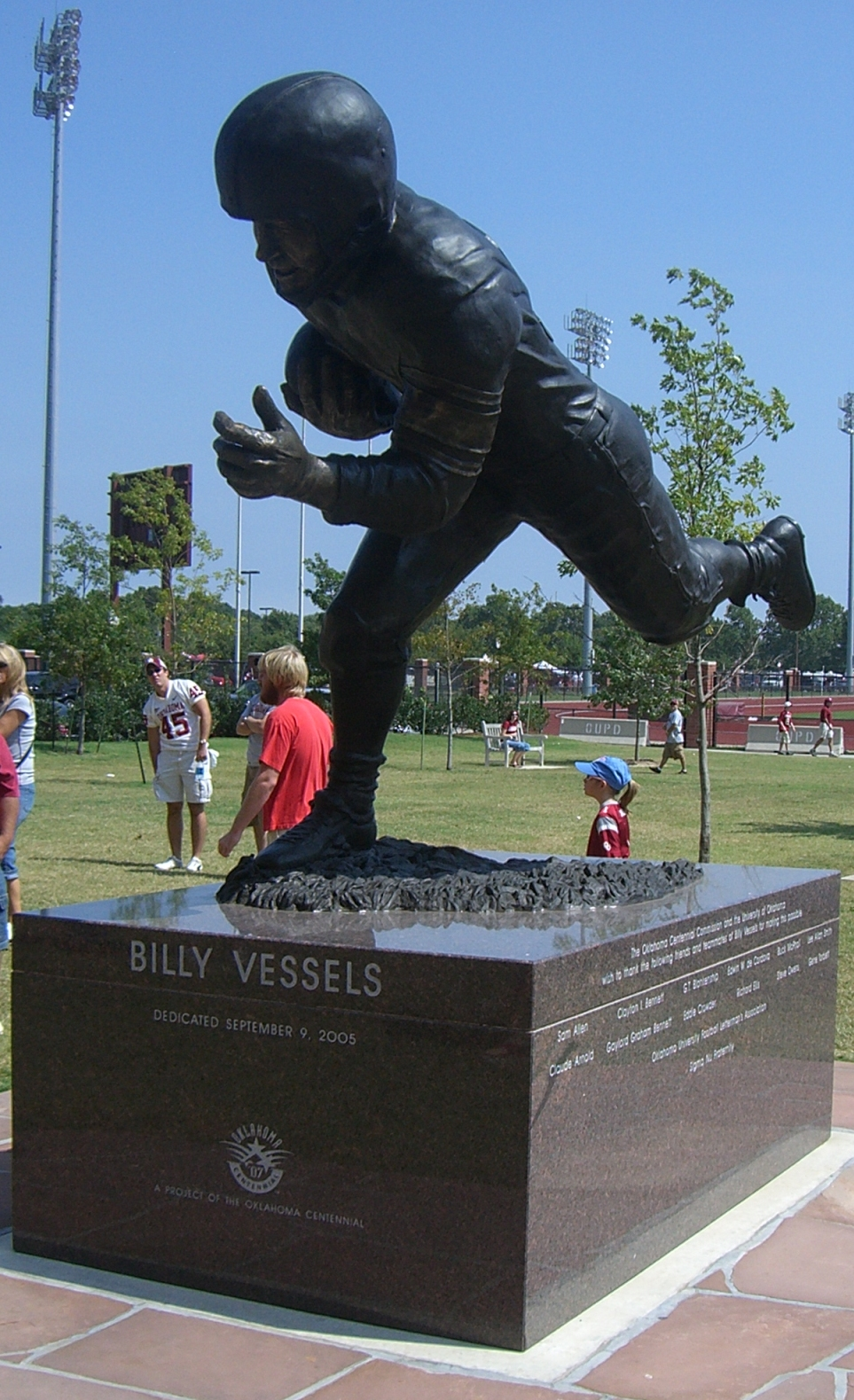
Billy Vessels statue in Heisman Park at Gaylord Family Oklahoma Memorial Stadium, Norman

After his football career, Vessels was employed for many years by The Mackle Construction Company, one of Florida's leading developers.

In the 1970s, he became involved in horse breeding and served on the Florida Parimutuel Commission from 1976 to 1983, becoming its executive director. He was elected president of the National Association of State Racing Commissions in 1984 and served as director of the Florida division of Parimutuel Wagering from 1987 to 1989.

Vessels did not self-aggrandize over his football career, preferring to move along with life, as he explained to Baltimore sportswriter John Steadman: "I don't like to be abrupt when I'm asked about the past, but when your football days are over, I prefer they be forgotten. That's how I felt in 1957 when I quit and went into another phase of my life, and that's how I feel now."

=== Death and legacy ===
Billy Vessels died in Coral Gables, Florida, on November 17, 2001. He was 70 years old at the time of his death.

In September 2003, Cleveland, Oklahoma renamed its high school football stadium "Billy Vessels Memorial Stadium" in honor of Vessels. In 2007, the University of Oklahoma, through the state's Centennial Celebration, awarded the Vessels Heisman statue to Cleveland, Oklahoma, where it sits across from Cleveland High School in front of the school's gymnasium and event center. OU replaced its statue, and those of its other Heisman winners, the next spring.
