= Claude Arnold =

American gridiron football player (1924–2016)

Profile
- Position: Quarterback

Personal information
- Born: November 1, 1924; Okmulgee, Oklahoma, U.S.
- Died: December 23, 2016 (aged 92); Oklahoma City, Oklahoma, U.S.
- Listed height: 6 ft 0 in (1.83 m)
- Listed weight: 170 lb (77 kg)

Career information
- College: Oklahoma

Career history
- 1952–1954: Edmonton Eskimos

Awards and highlights
- Grey Cup champion (1954); National champion (1950); Second-team All-Big Seven (1950)

Claude C. Arnold (November 1, 1924 – December 23, 2016) was an American professional football player who played for the Edmonton Eskimos. He won the Grey Cup with the Eskimos in 1954. He previously attended and played football at the University of Oklahoma, and was the quarterback of the school's first national championship team in 1950. He died in Oklahoma City in 2016 at the age of 92.

== See also ==
- List of NCAA major college football yearly passing leaders
