= Bobby Reynolds (American football) =

American football player (1931–1985)

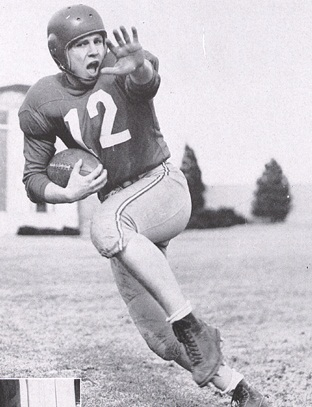
- Reynolds from 1951 Cornhusker

Profile
- Position: Halfback

Personal information
- Born: June 27, 1931; Grand Island, Nebraska, U.S.
- Died: August 19, 1985 (aged 54); Lincoln, Nebraska, U.S.

Career information
- College: University of Nebraska
- NFL draft: 1953: 7th round, 84th overall pick

Awards and highlights
- First-team All-American (1950); First-team All-Big Seven (1950)
- College Football Hall of Fame

Bobby Reynolds (June 27, 1931 – August 19, 1985) was an American football player who became known as "Mr. Touchdown". He was elected to the College Football Hall of Fame in 1984.

== Playing career ==
Reynolds attended Grand Island High where he played both basketball and football, winning state team titles in 1947 and 1948 in both sports. He attended the University of Nebraska where he became a First-Team All-American in 1950. A shoulder separation, broken leg, and lime-in-the-eye infection slowed him down the following two seasons. However, Reynolds still set then career records for scoring and rushing.

To promote the 1950 song "Mr. Touchdown, U.S.A.", RCA offered a prize of a television set and a silver-plated album to the college football player who scored the most touchdowns during the 1950 football season. Reynolds ultimately claimed the prize, which was presented to him by Hugo Winterhalter in February 1951. Reynolds, who was well known among Nebraska fans for his 1950 season, was thereafter described as "Mr. Touchdown".

== Later life and death ==
Reynolds was inducted into the College Football Hall of Fame in 1984.

In August 1985, Reynolds suffered a cerebral hemorrhage, dying two days later.

== See also ==
- List of NCAA major college football yearly scoring leaders
