= 1950 Oklahoma Sooners football team =

American college football season

1950 Oklahoma Sooners football

Consensus national champion Big 7 champion

Sugar Bowl, L 7–13 vs. Kentucky
- Conference: Big Seven Conference

Ranking
- Coaches: No. 1
- AP: No. 1
- Record: 10–1 (6–0 Big 7)
- Head coach: Bud Wilkinson (4th season)
- Captains: Norman McNabb; Harry Moore
- Home stadium: Oklahoma Memorial Stadium

1950 Big Seven Conference football standings
| | Conf. | | | | | Overall |
| Team | W | | L | | T | W | | L | | T |
|---|---|---|---|---|---|---|---|---|---|---|
| No. 1 Oklahoma $ | 6 | – | 0 | – | 0 | 10 | – | 1 | – | 0 |
| No. 17 Nebraska | 4 | – | 2 | – | 0 | 6 | – | 2 | – | 1 |
| Missouri | 3 | – | 2 | – | 1 | 4 | – | 5 | – | 1 |
| Kansas | 3 | – | 3 | – | 0 | 6 | – | 4 | – | 0 |
| Iowa State | 2 | – | 3 | – | 1 | 3 | – | 6 | – | 1 |
| Colorado | 2 | – | 4 | – | 0 | 5 | – | 4 | – | 1 |
| Kansas State | 0 | – | 6 | – | 0 | 1 | – | 9 | – | 1 |
$ – Conference champion; Rankings from AP Poll

The 1950 Oklahoma Sooners football team represented the University of Oklahoma in the 1950 college football season, the 56th season of Sooner football. Led by fourth-year head coach Bud Wilkinson, they played their home games at Oklahoma Memorial Stadium in Norman, and competed in the Big Seven Conference.

The Sooners finished the regular season 10–0 (6–0 in Big 7), and won their fifth consecutive conference championship, and eleventh overall. Both major polls (AP writers, UP coaches) awarded the Sooners with their first national championship at the end of the regular season. They were invited to the Sugar Bowl in New Orleans on New Year's Day, but were upset 13–7 by the Kentucky Wildcats, halting their winning streak at 32 games.

Five Sooners received All-American honors following the season: Frankie Anderson, Buddy Jones, Leon Heath, and Jim Weatherall. In addition, eight sooners won all conference honors, Anderson, Claude Arnold, Tom Catlin, Heath, Norman McNabb, Harry Moore, Billy Vessels, and Weatherall.

== Schedule ==
| Date | Opponent | Rank | Site | Result | Attendance | Source |
|---|---|---|---|---|---|---|
| September 30 | Boston College* | No. 6 | Oklahoma Memorial Stadium; Norman, OK | W 28–0 | 36,049 | |
| October 7 | Texas A&M* | No. 5 | Oklahoma Memorial Stadium; Norman, OK | W 34–28 | 36,586 | |
| October 14 | vs. No. 4 Texas* | No. 3 | Fair Park; Dallas, TX (rivalry) | W 14–13 | 75,959 | |
| October 21 | Kansas State | No. 2 | Memorial Stadium; Norman, OK | W 58–0 | 38,546 | |
| October 28 | at Iowa State | No. 3 | Clyde Williams Field; Ames, IA | W 20–7 | 16,883 | |
| November 4 | at Colorado | No. 3 | Folsom Field; Boulder, CO | W 27–18 | 30,001 | |
| November 11 | at Kansas | No. 3 | Memorial Stadium; Lawrence, KS | W 33–13 | 37,621 | |
| November 18 | Missouri | No. 2 | Oklahoma Memorial Stadium; Norman, OK (rivalry) | W 41–7 | 46,463 | |
| November 25 | No. 16 Nebraska | No. 1 | Memorial Stadium; Norman, OK (rivalry) | W 49–35 | 53,066 | |
| December 2 | at Oklahoma A&M* | No. 1 | Lewis Field; Stillwater, OK (Bedlam) | W 41–14 | 28,530 | |
| January 1, 1951 | vs. No. 7 Kentucky* | No. 1 | Tulane Stadium; New Orleans, LA (Sugar Bowl) | L 7–13 | 80,206 | |
*Non-conference game; Rankings from AP Poll released prior to the game

== Rankings ==
Ranking movements Legend: ██ Increase in ranking ██ Decrease in ranking ( ) = First-place votes
| | Week | | | | | | | | | |
| Poll | Pre | 1 | 2 | 3 | 4 | 5 | 6 | 7 | 8 | Final |
|---|---|---|---|---|---|---|---|---|---|---|
| AP | 6 (3) | 5 (17) | 3 (29) | 2 (47) | 3 (35) | 3 (25) | 3 (48) | 2 (63) | 1 (173) | 1 (213) |

== Roster ==
- QB Eddie Crowder, So.
- QB Claude Arnold, Sr.
- HB Billy Vessels, So.
- T Jim Weatherall
- RE Bill Beckman, So.

== Game summaries ==
=== Texas (Red River Shootout) ===
Late in the contest, a low punt snap gives Oklahoma the ball at the Texas 11. Billy Vessels dashes around right end for the touchdown while Texas native Jim Weatherall kicks the game-winning extra point for the 14–13 victory. Minutes earlier, Longhorns defensive back Bobby Dillon had returned at interception 50 yards for a touchdown and a 13-7 Texas lead. Twice during the contest Texas had goal-line scoring opportunities, once stopped by Oklahoma's defense at the one-yard line and another ended with a fumble at the five.

== NFL draft ==
The following players were drafted into the National Football League following the season.

| Round | Pick | Player | Position | NFL team |
|---|---|---|---|---|
| 1 | 4 | Leon Heath | Back | Washington Redskins |
| 8 | 95 | Clair Mayes | Guard | Chicago Bears |
| 9 | 107 | Nolan Lang | Back | Los Angeles Rams |
| 11 | 128 | Frankie Anderson | End | Detroit Lions |
| 12 | 229 | Ed Lisak | Back | Chicago Bears |
