= 1951 NFL draft =

National Football League draft

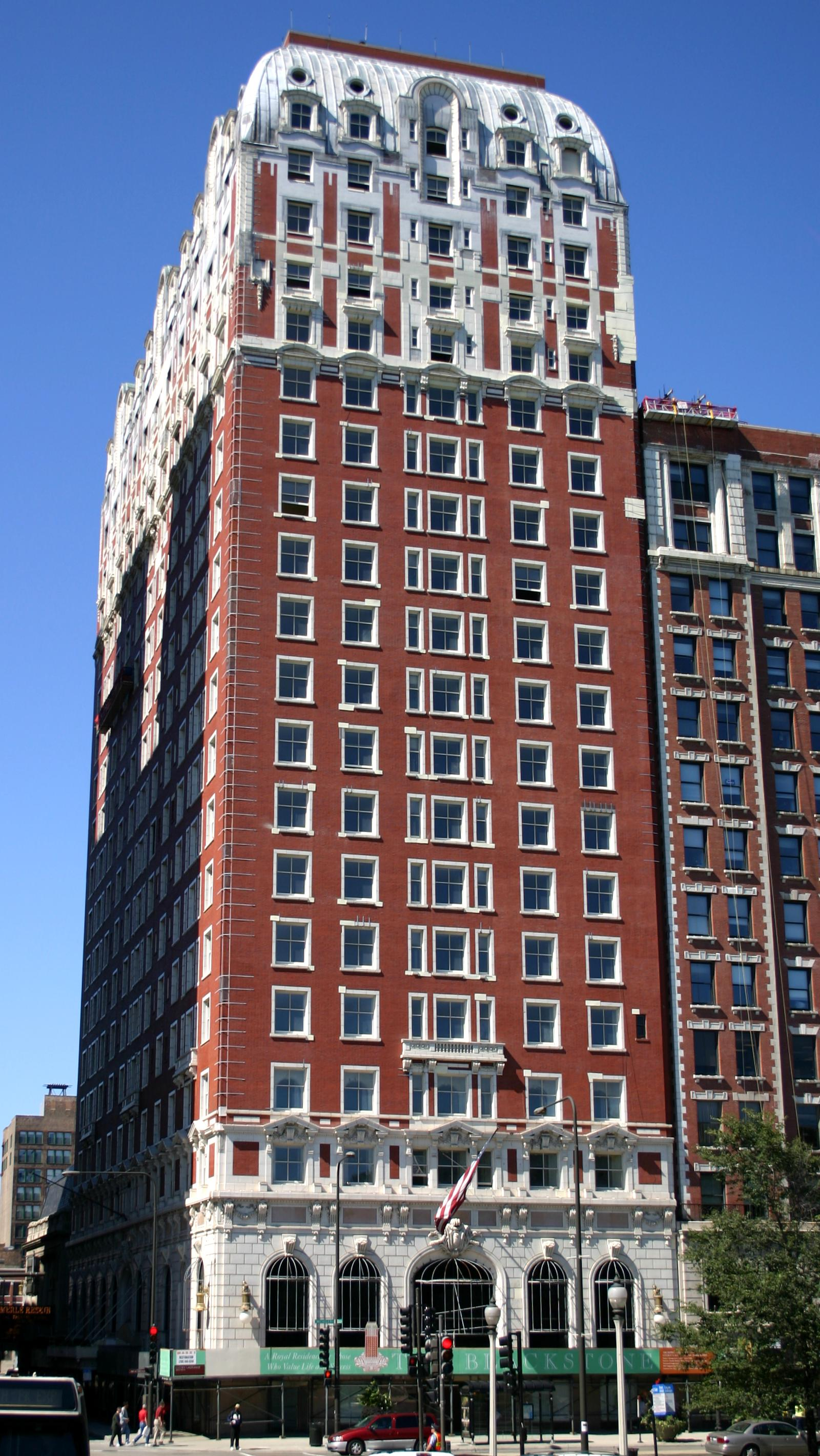
- The Blackstone hotel (location of the draft), photographed in 2004

General information
- Date: January 18–19, 1951
- Location: The Blackstone Hotel in Chicago, Illinois

Overview
- 362 total selections in 30 rounds
- League: NFL
- First selection: Kyle Rote, HB; New York Giants
- Most selections (36): Cleveland Browns
- Fewest selections (27): New York Yanks
- Hall of Famers: 9: QB Y. A. Tittle; G Dick Stanfel; LB Bill George; DT Art Donovan; OT Mike McCormack; S Jack Christiansen; DB Don Shula; DE Andy Robustelli; CB Jack Butler

The 1951 NFL draft was held January 18–19, 1951, at the Blackstone Hotel in Chicago.

The Baltimore Colts folded after the 1950 season, and the NFL placed their players in the 1951 NFL draft. Twenty players appearing on the Colts' 1950 roster were subsequently selected, with future Hall of Fame quarterback Y. A. Tittle leading the list, going to the San Francisco 49ers with the third pick overall.

This was the fifth year that the first overall pick was a bonus pick determined by lottery, with the previous four winners (Chicago Bears in 1947, Washington Redskins in 1948, Philadelphia Eagles in 1949, and Detroit Lions in 1950) ineligible from the draw; it was won by the New York Giants, who selected halfback Kyle Rote.

== Player selections ==
| = Pro Bowler | = Hall of Famer |

=== Round 1 ===
| Pick # | NFL team | Player | Position | College |
|---|---|---|---|---|
| 1 | New York Giants ^{(Lottery bonus pick)} | Kyle Rote | Halfback | SMU |
| 2 | Chicago Bears ^{(From Baltimore Colts)} | Bob Williams | Quarterback | Notre Dame |
| 3 | San Francisco 49ers | Y. A. Tittle | Quarterback | LSU (Redrafted Colt) |
| 4 | Washington Redskins | Leon Heath | Fullback | Oklahoma |
| 5 | Green Bay Packers | Bob Gain | Tackle | Kentucky |
| 6 | Chicago Cardinals | Jerry Groom | Center | Notre Dame |
| 7 | Philadelphia Eagles | Ebert Van Buren | Back | LSU |
| 8 | Philadelphia Eagles ^{(From Detroit Lions)} | Chet Mutryn | Back | Xavier (Redrafted Colt) |
| 9 | Pittsburgh Steelers | Butch Avinger | Fullback | Alabama |
| 10 | Chicago Bears ^{(From New York Yanks)} | Billy Stone | Halfback | Bradley (Redrafted Colt) |
| 11 | Los Angeles Rams | Bud McFadin | Guard | Texas |
| 12 | Chicago Bears | Gene Schroeder | End | Virginia |
| 13 | New York Giants | Jim Spavital | Fullback | Oklahoma A&M |
| 14 | Cleveland Browns | Ken Konz | Back | LSU |

- ^{HOF} Member of the Professional Football Hall of Fame

=== Round 2 ===
| Pick # | NFL team | Player | Position | College |
|---|---|---|---|---|
| 15 | Washington Redskins | Ed Salem | Back | Alabama |
| 16 | Green Bay Packers | Albin Collins | Back | LSU (Redrafted Colt) |
| 17 | San Francisco 49ers | Pete Schabarum | Back | California |
| 18 | Chicago Cardinals | Don Joyce | Tackle | Tulane |
| 19 | Detroit Lions | Dick Stanfel | Guard | San Francisco |
| 20 | Pittsburgh Steelers | Chuck Ortmann | Halfback | Michigan |
| 21 | Washington Redskins | Jim Staton | Tackle | Wake Forest |
| 22 | New York Yanks | Ken Jackson | Tackle | Texas |
| 23 | Chicago Bears | Bill George | Linebacker | Wake Forest |
| 24 | Los Angeles Rams | Herb Rich | Back | Vanderbilt (Redrafted Colt) |
| 25 | New York Giants | Ray Krouse | Tackle | Maryland |
| 26 | Cleveland Browns | Bucky Curtis | End | Vanderbilt |

=== Round 3 ===
| Pick # | NFL team | Player | Position | College |
|---|---|---|---|---|
| 27 | Green Bay Packers | Fred Cone | Halfback | Clemson |
| 28 | San Francisco 49ers | Billy Mixon | Back | Georgia |
| 29 | Washington Redskins | Walt Yowarsky | Tackle | Kentucky |
| 30 | Chicago Cardinals | Don Stonesifer | End | Northwestern |
| 31 | Pittsburgh Steelers | George Sulima | End | Boston University |
| 32 | Philadelphia Eagles | Al Bruno | End | Kentucky |
| 33 | Detroit Lions | Dorne Dibble | End | Michigan State |
| 34 | New York Yanks | Mike McCormack | Tackle | Kansas |
| 35 | Los Angeles Rams | Charlie Toogood | Tackle | Nebraska |
| 36 | Chicago Bears | Wilford White | Back | Arizona State |
| 37 | New York Giants | Sonny Grandelius | Back | Michigan State |
| 38 | Cleveland Browns | Jerry Helluin | Tackle | Tulane |

=== Round 4 ===
| Pick # | NFL team | Player | Position | College |
|---|---|---|---|---|
| 39 | Cleveland Browns | Bob Oristaglio | End | Penn (Redrafted Colt) |
| 40 | Washington Redskins | Paul Giroski | Tackle | Rice |
| 41 | Cleveland Browns | Bob Smith | Back | Texas A&M |
| 42 | Chicago Cardinals | Dick Doyne | Back | Lehigh |
| 43 | Philadelphia Eagles | Fran Nagle | Back | Nebraska |
| 44 | Detroit Lions | Pete D'Alonzo | Back | Villanova |
| 45 | Pittsburgh Steelers | Bear French | Tackle | Purdue (Redrafted Colt) |
| 46 | New York Yanks | Elmer Wingate | End | Maryland |
| 47 | Chicago Bears | Bob Moser | Center | Pacific |
| 48 | Los Angeles Rams | George Kinek | Back | Tulane |
| 49 | Chicago Bears | Tom Jelley | End | Miami (FL) |
| 50 | Cleveland Browns | Art Donovan | Tackle | Boston College (Redrafted Colt) |

=== Round 5 ===
| Pick # | NFL team | Player | Position | College |
|---|---|---|---|---|
| 51 | Chicago Cardinals | Lynn Lynch | Guard | Illinois |
| 52 | Green Bay Packers | Wade Stinson | Back | Kansas |
| 53 | San Francisco 49ers | Dick Steere | Tackle | Drake |
| 54 | San Francisco 49ers | Al Carapella | Tackle | Miami (FL) |
| 55 | Detroit Lions | Jim Doran | End | Iowa State |
| 56 | Pittsburgh Steelers | Floyd Sampson | Back | McMurry |
| 57 | Philadelphia Eagles | Jack Dwyer | Back | Loyola (CA) |
| 58 | Detroit Lions | LaVern Torgeson | Center | Washington State |
| 59 | Los Angeles Rams | Tony Momsen | Center | Michigan |
| 60 | Chicago Bears | Brad Rowland | Back | McMurry |
| 61 | New York Giants | Jack Stroud | Tackle | Tennessee |
| 62 | Cleveland Browns | Ace Loomis | Back | UW–La Crosse |

=== Round 6 ===
| Pick # | NFL team | Player | Position | College |
|---|---|---|---|---|
| 63 | Green Bay Packers | Sig Holowenko | Tackle | John Carroll |
| 64 | San Francisco 49ers | Bishop Strickland | Back | South Carolina |
| 65 | Washington Redskins | John Martinkovic | End | Xavier |
| 66 | Chicago Cardinals | Ed Jasonek | Back | Furman |
| 67 | Pittsburgh Steelers | Dale Dodrill | Guard | Colorado A&M |
| 68 | Philadelphia Eagles | Ken Farragut | Center | Ole Miss |
| 69 | Detroit Lions | Jack Christiansen | Safety | Colorado A&M |
| 70 | New York Yanks | George Musacco | Back | Loyola (CA) |
| 71 | Chicago Bears | Herb Falkenberg | Back | Trinity (TX) |
| 72 | Los Angeles Rams | Norb Hecker | End | Baldwin Wallace |
| 73 | New York Giants | Herb Hannah | Tackle | Alabama |
| 74 | Cleveland Browns | Dan Rogas | Guard | Tulane |

=== Round 7 ===
| Pick # | NFL team | Player | Position | College |
|---|---|---|---|---|
| 75 | San Francisco 49ers | Dick Forbes | End | St. Ambrose |
| 76 | Washington Redskins | Johnny Papit | Back | Virginia |
| 77 | Green Bay Packers | Bill Sutherland | End | St. Vincent |
| 78 | Chicago Cardinals | Dick Punches | Tackle | Colorado |
| 79 | Philadelphia Eagles | Frank Boydston | Back | Baylor |
| 80 | Detroit Lions | Bob Momsen | Tackle | Ohio State |
| 81 | Pittsburgh Steelers | Ray Mathews | Back | Clemson |
| 82 | Cleveland Browns | Irv Holdash | Center | North Carolina |
| 83 | Los Angeles Rams | Alan Egler | Back | Colgate |
| 84 | Chicago Bears | Paul Lea | Tackle | Tulane |
| 85 | New York Giants | Joel Williams | Center | Texas (Redrafted Colt) |
| 86 | Cleveland Browns | Walt Michaels | Back | Washington & Lee |

=== Round 8 ===
| Pick # | NFL team | Player | Position | College |
|---|---|---|---|---|
| 87 | Washington Redskins | Billy Cox | Back | Duke |
| 88 | Cleveland Browns | Art Spinney | End | Boston College (Redrafted Colt) |
| 89 | San Francisco 49ers | Joe Arenas | Back | Nebraska–Omaha |
| 90 | Chicago Cardinals | Leo Sanford | Center | Louisiana Tech |
| 91 | Detroit Lions | Dick Raklovits | Back | Illinois |
| 92 | Pittsburgh Steelers | Henry Minarik | End | Michigan State |
| 93 | Philadelphia Eagles | Jack Richards | End | Arkansas |
| 94 | New York Yanks | Larry Lauer | Center | Alabama |
| 95 | Chicago Bears | Clair Mayes | Guard | Oklahoma |
| 96 | Los Angeles Rams | Hugo Primiani | Tackle | Boston University |
| 97 | New York Giants | Fred Benners | Back | SMU |
| 98 | Cleveland Browns | Max Clark | Back | Houston |

=== Round 9 ===
| Pick # | NFL team | Player | Position | College |
|---|---|---|---|---|
| 99 | Green Bay Packers | Dick McWilliams | Tackle | Michigan |
| 100 | San Francisco 49ers | Bruce Van Alstyne | End | Stanford |
| 101 | Washington Redskins | Jake Rowden | Center | Maryland |
| 102 | Chicago Cardinals | Neil Schmidt | Back | Purdue |
| 103 | Pittsburgh Steelers | John Schweder | Guard | Penn |
| 104 | Philadelphia Eagles | Denny Doyle | Guard | Tulane |
| 105 | Cleveland Browns | Burl Toler | Guard | San Francisco |
| 106 | New York Yanks | Don Colo | Tackle | Brown (Redrafted Colt) |
| 107 | Los Angeles Rams | Nolan Lang | Back | Oklahoma |
| 108 | Chicago Bears | Bill Gregus | Back | Wake Forest |
| 109 | New York Giants | Holland Donan | Tackle | Princeton |
| 110 | Cleveland Browns | Don Shula | Back | John Carroll |

=== Round 10 ===
| Pick # | NFL team | Player | Position | College |
|---|---|---|---|---|
| 111 | Washington Redskins | James Janosek | Tackle | Purdue |
| 112 | San Francisco 49ers | Nick Feher | Guard | Georgia |
| 113 | Washington Redskins | Bob Jensen | End | Iowa State |
| 114 | Green Bay Packers | Bob Noppinger | Tackle | Georgetown |
| 115 | Chicago Cardinals | Ken Cooper | Guard | Vanderbilt (Redrafted Colt) |
| 116 | Philadelphia Eagles | Louis Schaufele | Back | Arkansas |
| 117 | Detroit Lions | Jim Shoaf | Guard | LSU |
| 118 | Pittsburgh Steelers | Paul Salata | End | USC |
| 119 | New York Yanks | Jesse Thomas | Back | Michigan State |
| 120 | Chicago Bears | J. W. Sherrill | Back | Tennessee |
| 121 | Los Angeles Rams | Roland Kirkby | Back | Washington |
| 122 | New York Giants | Earl Murray | Guard | Purdue |
| 123 | Cleveland Browns | Chet Gierula | Guard | Maryland |

=== Round 11 ===
| Pick # | NFL team | Player | Position | College |
|---|---|---|---|---|
| 124 | Washington Redskins | Bill DeChard | Back | Holy Cross |
| 125 | Green Bay Packers | George Rooks | Back | Morgan State |
| 126 | San Francisco 49ers | Bill Jessup | End | USC |
| 127 | Chicago Cardinals | Tom Bienemann | End | Drake |
| 128 | Detroit Lions | Frankie Anderson | End | Oklahoma |
| 129 | Pittsburgh Steelers | Joe McCutcheon | Center | Washington & Lee |
| 130 | Philadelphia Eagles | Bob Pope | Tackle | Kentucky |
| 131 | New York Yanks | Steve Wyndham | Back | Clemson |
| 132 | Los Angeles Rams | John Natyshak | Back | Tampa |
| 133 | Chicago Bears | Tom Hardiman | Back | Georgetown |
| 134 | New York Giants | Reds Bagnell | Back | Penn |
| 135 | Cleveland Browns | Bernie Custis | Back | Syracuse |

=== Round 12 ===
| Pick # | NFL team | Player | Position | College |
|---|---|---|---|---|
| 136 | Green Bay Packers | Carl Kreager | Center | Michigan |
| 137 | San Francisco 49ers | Jim Monachino | Back | California |
| 138 | Washington Redskins | Al Applegate | Guard | Scranton |
| 139 | Chicago Cardinals | Jack Landry | Back | Notre Dame |
| 140 | Pittsburgh Steelers | Jim Brandt | Back | St. Thomas (MN) |
| 141 | Philadelphia Eagles | Henry Rich | Back | Arizona State |
| 142 | Cleveland Browns | Milan Sellers | Back | Florida State |
| 143 | New York Yanks | Al Lary | End | Alabama |
| 144 | Chicago Bears | Punjab Hairston | Tackle | Nevada |
| 145 | Los Angeles Rams | Don Hardey | Back | Pacific |
| 146 | New York Giants | Bob Hudson | End | Clemson |
| 147 | Cleveland Browns | Stew Kirtley | End | Morehead State |

=== Round 13 ===
| Pick # | NFL team | Player | Position | College |
|---|---|---|---|---|
| 148 | San Francisco 49ers | Dick Harvin | End | Georgia Tech |
| 149 | Washington Redskins | Dick Campbell | Back | Wyoming |
| 150 | Green Bay Packers | Ed Stephens | Back | Missouri |
| 151 | Chicago Cardinals | Volney Peters | Tackle | USC |
| 152 | Philadelphia Eagles | Pete Mastellone | Center | Miami (FL) |
| 153 | Detroit Lions | Wayne Siegert | Tackle | Illinois |
| 154 | Pittsburgh Steelers | Bill Szabo | Tackle | Bucknell |
| 155 | New York Yanks | John Thomas | End | Oregon State |
| 156 | Los Angeles Rams | Joe Reid | Center | LSU |
| 157 | Chicago Bears | Charley Wright | Back | West Texas State |
| 158 | New York Giants | Paul Douglass | Back | Illinois |
| 159 | Cleveland Browns | Bob Voskuhl | Center | Georgetown (KY) |

=== Round 14 ===
| Pick # | NFL team | Player | Position | College |
|---|---|---|---|---|
| 160 | Washington Redskins | Adrian Burk | Quarterback | Baylor (Redrafted Colt) |
| 161 | Green Bay Packers | Ray Bauer | End | Montana |
| 162 | San Francisco 49ers | Rex Berry | Back | BYU |
| 163 | Chicago Cardinals | Bill Leskovar | Back | Kentucky |
| 164 | Detroit Lions | Lee Wittmer | Tackle | Detroit |
| 165 | Pittsburgh Steelers | Mike Mizerany | Guard | Alabama |
| 166 | Philadelphia Eagles | Bobby Walston | End | Georgia |
| 167 | New York Yanks | Charley Rapp | Back | Duquesne |
| 168 | Chicago Bears | Bailey Woods | Back | Abilene Christian |
| 169 | Los Angeles Rams | Rob McCoy | Back | Georgia Tech |
| 170 | New York Giants | Pat Flanagan | Tackle | Marquette |
| 171 | Cleveland Browns | Rudy Cernoch | Tackle | Northwestern |

=== Round 15 ===
| Pick # | NFL team | Player | Position | College |
|---|---|---|---|---|
| 172 | Green Bay Packers | Joe Ernst | Back | Tulane |
| 173 | San Francisco 49ers | Dave Sparks | Guard | South Carolina |
| 174 | Washington Redskins | Vic Thomas | Tackle | Colorado |
| 175 | Chicago Cardinals | John Simcic | Guard | Wisconsin |
| 176 | Pittsburgh Steelers | Clay Webb | Back | Kentucky |
| 177 | Philadelphia Eagles | Bobby North | Back | Georgia Tech |
| 178 | Detroit Lions | Jim Hill | Back | Tennessee |
| 179 | New York Yanks | Bill Wanamaker | Guard | Kentucky |
| 180 | Los Angeles Rams | Obie Posey | Back | Southern |
| 181 | Chicago Bears | Sid Hall | Center | Pacific |
| 182 | New York Giants | Gene Vykukal | Tackle | Texas |
| 183 | Cleveland Browns | Joe Skibinski | Guard | Purdue |

=== Round 16 ===
| Pick # | NFL team | Player | Position | College |
|---|---|---|---|---|
| 184 | San Francisco 49ers | Bob White | Back | Stanford |
| 185 | Washington Redskins | Bob Bates | Center | Texas A&M |
| 186 | Green Bay Packers | Dick Afflis | Tackle | Nevada |
| 187 | Chicago Cardinals | Gene Miller | Back | Northwestern |
| 188 | Philadelphia Eagles | Hal Hatfield | End | USC |
| 189 | Detroit Lions | Ted Geremsky | End | Pittsburgh |
| 190 | Pittsburgh Steelers | Lambert Oberg | Center | Trinity (CT) |
| 191 | New York Yanks | Bill Fray | Tackle | Idaho |
| 192 | Chicago Bears | Frank Volm | End | Marquette |
| 193 | Los Angeles Rams | Bill Robertson | End | Memphis State |
| 194 | New York Giants | Alan Pfeifer | End | Fordham |
| 195 | Cleveland Browns | Ed Pasky | Back | South Carolina |

=== Round 17 ===
| Pick # | NFL team | Player | Position | College |
|---|---|---|---|---|
| 196 | Washington Redskins | Gene Brito | End | Loyola (CA) |
| 197 | Green Bay Packers | Ray Pelfrey | Back | Eastern Kentucky |
| 198 | San Francisco 49ers | Art Michalik | Guard | St. Ambrose |
| 199 | Chicago Cardinals | Henry May | Center | Southwest Missouri State |
| 200 | Detroit Lions | Darrel Meisenheimer | Back | Oklahoma A&M |
| 201 | Pittsburgh Steelers | Ted Gehlmann | Tackle | William & Mary |
| 202 | Philadelphia Eagles | Hal Waggoner | Back | Tulane |
| 203 | New York Yanks | Dick Rowan | Center | Texas |
| 204 | Los Angeles Rams | Hal Riley | End | Baylor |
| 205 | Chicago Bears | Don Dufek | Back | Michigan |
| 206 | New York Giants | Bud Sherrod | End | Tennessee |
| 207 | Cleveland Browns | Leroy Ka-Ne | Back | Dayton |

=== Round 18 ===
| Pick # | NFL team | Player | Position | College |
|---|---|---|---|---|
| 208 | Green Bay Packers | Ed Petela | Back | Boston College |
| 209 | San Francisco 49ers | Jim Murphy | Tackle | Xavier |
| 210 | Washington Redskins | Dom Fucci | Back | Kentucky |
| 211 | Chicago Cardinals | Russ Pomeroy | Tackle | Stanford |
| 212 | Pittsburgh Steelers | Pat Field | Back | Georgia |
| 213 | Philadelphia Eagles | Bill Weeks | Back | Iowa State |
| 214 | Detroit Lions | Eddie Wolgast | Back | Arizona |
| 215 | New York Yanks | Bob Watson | End | UCLA |
| 216 | Chicago Bears | Chuck Brown | Guard | Illinois |
| 217 | Los Angeles Rams | Dick Daugherty | Guard | Oregon |
| 218 | New York Giants | Frank Smith | Back | Miami (FL) |
| 219 | Cleveland Browns | Rube DeRoin | Center | Oklahoma A&M |

=== Round 19 ===
| Pick # | NFL team | Player | Position | College |
|---|---|---|---|---|
| 220 | San Francisco 49ers | John Phillips | Back | Mississippi Southern |
| 221 | Washington Redskins | Buddy Brown | Guard | Arkansas |
| 222 | Green Bay Packers | Jim Liber | Back | Xavier |
| 223 | Chicago Cardinals | Gene Ackerman | End | Missouri |
| 224 | Philadelphia Eagles | John Bove | Tackle | West Virginia |
| 225 | Detroit Lions | Gordy Hanson | Tackle | Washington State |
| 226 | Pittsburgh Steelers | Bill Pavlikowski | Back | Boston University |
| 227 | New York Yanks | Ralph Longmore | Back | Duquesne |
| 228 | Los Angeles Rams | Andy Robustelli | Defensive end | Arnold |
| 229 | Chicago Bears | Ed Lisak | Back | Oklahoma |
| 230 | New York Giants | Billy Conn | Back | Auburn |
| 231 | Cleveland Browns | Ray Solari | Guard | California |

=== Round 20 ===
| Pick # | NFL team | Player | Position | College |
|---|---|---|---|---|
| 232 | Washington Redskins | John Kerestes | Back | Purdue |
| 233 | Green Bay Packers | Dick Johnson | Tackle | Virginia |
| 234 | San Francisco 49ers | Al Tate | Tackle | Illinois |
| 235 | Chicago Cardinals | Fred Wallner | Guard | Notre Dame |
| 236 | Detroit Lions | Harry Gibbons | Back | South Dakota State |
| 237 | Pittsburgh Steelers | Tex Donnelly | Tackle | Holy Cross |
| 238 | Philadelphia Eagles | John Glorioso | Back | Missouri |
| 239 | New York Yanks | Jerrell Price | Tackle | Texas Tech |
| 240 | Chicago Bears | Larry Smith | Center | South Carolina |
| 241 | Los Angeles Rams | Jim Nutter | Back | Wichita |
| 242 | New York Giants | Bill Albright | Tackle | Wisconsin |
| 243 | Cleveland Browns | Jack Crocher | Back | Tulsa |

=== Round 21 ===
| Pick # | NFL team | Player | Position | College |
|---|---|---|---|---|
| 244 | Green Bay Packers | Art Edling | End | Minnesota |
| 245 | San Francisco 49ers | Hardy Brown | Back | Tulsa |
| 246 | Washington Redskins | Clarence Marable | Tackle | TCU |
| 247 | Chicago Cardinals | Dick Bunting | End | Drake |
| 248 | Pittsburgh Steelers | Ernie Cheatham | Tackle | Loyola (CA) |
| 249 | Philadelphia Eagles | Neal Franklin | Tackle | SMU |
| 250 | Detroit Lions | King Block | Back | Idaho |
| 251 | New York Yanks | Al Pollard | Back | Army |
| 252 | Los Angeles Rams | Earl Stelle | Back | Oregon |
| 253 | Chicago Bears | Larry Higgins | Back | Fordham |
| 254 | New York Giants | Bernie Lemonick | Guard | Penn |
| 255 | Cleveland Browns | Ray Stone | End | Texas |

=== Round 22 ===
| Pick # | NFL team | Player | Position | College |
|---|---|---|---|---|
| 256 | San Francisco 49ers | Dwight Winslow | Back | Boise JC |
| 257 | Washington Redskins | Elliot Speed | Center | Alabama |
| 258 | Green Bay Packers | Art Felker | End | Marquette |
| 259 | Chicago Cardinals | S. J. Whitman | Back | Tulsa |
| 260 | Philadelphia Eagles | Jack Rucker | Back | Mississippi State |
| 261 | Detroit Lions | Dan Foldberg | End | Army |
| 262 | Pittsburgh Steelers | Dick Hendley | Back | Clemson |
| 263 | New York Yanks | Eddie King | Center | Boston College (Redrafted Colt) |
| 264 | Chicago Bears | Bob Hanson | Guard | Montana |
| 265 | Los Angeles Rams | Billy Baggett | Back | LSU |
| 266 | New York Giants | Waldo Binkley | Tackle | Austin Peay |
| 267 | Cleveland Browns | Carl Taseff | Cornerback | John Carroll |

=== Round 23 ===
| Pick # | NFL team | Player | Position | College |
|---|---|---|---|---|
| 268 | Washington Redskins | Zeke Martin | Back | North Texas State |
| 269 | Green Bay Packers | Tubba Chamberlain | Guard | UW–Eau Claire |
| 270 | San Francisco 49ers | Wally Brunswald | Back | Gustavus Adolphus |
| 271 | Chicago Cardinals | Jim Owens | End | Oklahoma (Redrafted Colt) |
| 272 | Detroit Lions | Dick Gabriel | Back | Lehigh |
| 273 | Pittsburgh Steelers | Joe Minor | End | John Carroll |
| 274 | Philadelphia Eagles | Jack Bighead | End | Pepperdine |
| 275 | New York Yanks | Dave Cunningham | Back | Utah |
| 276 | Los Angeles Rams | Dean Thomas | Tackle | Michigan State |
| 277 | Chicago Bears | Rene Hlavac | Tackle | Nebraska–Omaha |
| 278 | New York Giants | Dick Yelvington | Tackle | Georgia |
| 279 | Cleveland Browns | Johnny Champion | Back | SMU |

=== Round 24 ===
| Pick # | NFL team | Player | Position | College |
|---|---|---|---|---|
| 280 | Green Bay Packers | Dick Christie | Back | Nebraska–Omaha |
| 281 | San Francisco 49ers | Tom Kingsford | Back | Montana |
| 282 | Washington Redskins | Tom Powers | Back | Duke |
| 283 | Chicago Cardinals | Billy Cross | Back | West Texas State |
| 284 | Pittsburgh Steelers | Art Alois | Center | San Francisco |
| 285 | Philadelphia Eagles | Tony Kotowski | End | Mississippi State |
| 286 | Detroit Lions | George Buksar | Back | Purdue (Redrafted Colt) |
| 287 | New York Yanks | Breck Stroschein | End | UCLA |
| 288 | Chicago Bears | Pete Dokas | End | Mansfield |
| 289 | Los Angeles Rams | Harry Abeltin | Tackle | Colgate |
| 290 | New York Giants | Dick Kuh | Guard | Michigan State |
| 291 | Cleveland Browns | Wayne Benner | Back | Florida State |

=== Round 25 ===
| Pick # | NFL team | Player | Position | College |
|---|---|---|---|---|
| 292 | San Francisco 49ers | Mike Peterson | End | Denver |
| 293 | Washington Redskins | Bob Chubb | End | Shippensburg |
| 294 | Green Bay Packers | Monte Charles | Back | Hillsdale |
| 295 | Chicago Cardinals | Vernon Quick | Guard | Wofford |
| 296 | Philadelphia Eagles | Glenn Drahn | Back | Iowa |
| 297 | Detroit Lions | Dick Harris | Center | Texas |
| 298 | Pittsburgh Steelers | Tom Calvin | Back | Alabama |
| 299 | New York Yanks | Roy Boudreaux | Tackle | Southwestern Louisiana |
| 300 | Los Angeles Rams | Jackie Calvert | Tackle | Clemson |
| 301 | Chicago Bears | Johnny Miller | Back | Northwestern |
| 302 | New York Giants | Chet Lagod | Tackle | Chattanooga |
| 303 | Cleveland Browns | John Knispel | Tackle | UW–La Crosse |

=== Round 26 ===
| Pick # | NFL team | Player | Position | College |
|---|---|---|---|---|
| 304 | Washington Redskins | Johnny Williams | Back | USC |
| 305 | Green Bay Packers | Bill Miller | Tackle | Ohio State |
| 306 | San Francisco 49ers | Keith Carpenter | Tackle | San Jose State |
| 307 | Chicago Cardinals | Jeff Fleischmann | Back | Cornell |
| 308 | Detroit Lions | Frank Kazmierski | Center | West Virginia |
| 309 | Pittsburgh Steelers | Pug Pearman | Guard | Tennessee |
| 310 | Philadelphia Eagles | Billy Stewart | Back | Mississippi State |
| 311 | New York Yanks | Will Sherman | Back | St. Mary's (CA) |
| 312 | Chicago Bears | Buddy Rogers | Back | Arkansas |
| 313 | Los Angeles Rams | Howie Ruetz | Tackle | Loras |
| 314 | New York Giants | Quincy Armstrong | Center | North Texas State |
| 315 | Cleveland Browns | Fred Williams | Tackle | Arkansas |

=== Round 27 ===
| Pick # | NFL team | Player | Position | College |
|---|---|---|---|---|
| 316 | Green Bay Packers | Bob Bossons | Center | Georgia Tech |
| 317 | San Francisco 49ers | Ray Lung | Guard | Oregon |
| 318 | Washington Redskins | Bill Johnson | Back | Stetson |
| 319 | Chicago Cardinals | Ken Huxhold | Tackle | Wisconsin |
| 320 | Pittsburgh Steelers | Bob Radcliffe | Back | Wisconsin |
| 321 | Philadelphia Eagles | Bob Winship | Tackle | Rice |
| 322 | Detroit Lions | Harry Allis | End | Michigan |
| 323 | New York Yanks | Ed Price | Back | Texas Tech |
| 324 | Los Angeles Rams | Al Brosky | Back | Illinois |
| 325 | Chicago Bears | Jerry Taylor | Center | Wyoming |
| 326 | New York Giants | Charley Hubbard | End | Morris Harvey |
| 327 | Cleveland Browns | Jack Jones | Back | Livingston |

=== Round 28 ===
| Pick # | NFL team | Player | Position | College |
|---|---|---|---|---|
| 328 | San Francisco 49ers | Jack Rohan | Back | Loras |
| 329 | Washington Redskins | John Kadlec | Guard | Missouri |
| 330 | Green Bay Packers | Bill Ayre | Back | Abilene Christian |
| 331 | Chicago Cardinals | Dick Martin | Back | Kentucky |
| 332 | Philadelphia Eagles | Marv Stendel | End | Arkansas |
| 333 | Detroit Lions | Dick Peot | Tackle | South Dakota State |
| 334 | Pittsburgh Steelers | Howard Hansen | Back | UCLA |
| 335 | New York Yanks | Jim Chadband | Back | Idaho |
| 336 | Chicago Bears | Leon Campbell | Back | Arkansas (Redrafted Colt) |
| 337 | Los Angeles Rams | Sterling Wingo | Back | VPI |
| 338 | New York Giants | Hal Quinn | Guard | SMU |
| 339 | Cleveland Browns | Roger Thrift | Back | East Carolina |

=== Round 29 ===
| Pick # | NFL team | Player | Position | College |
|---|---|---|---|---|
| 340 | Washington Redskins | Art Stewart | Back | Southeastern State |
| 341 | Green Bay Packers | Ralph Fieler | End | Miami (FL) |
| 342 | San Francisco 49ers | S. P. Garnett | Tackle | Kansas |
| 343 | Chicago Cardinals | Bob Livingstone | Back | Notre Dame (Redrafted Colt) |
| 344 | Detroit Lions | Bruce Womack | Tackle | West Texas State |
| 345 | Pittsburgh Steelers | Fred Smith | End | Tulsa |
| 346 | Philadelphia Eagles | Roscoe Hansen | Tackle | North Carolina |
| 347 | New York Yanks | Veto Kissell | Back | Holy Cross (Redrafted Colt) |
| 348 | Los Angeles Rams | Earl Jackson | Back | Texas Tech |
| 349 | Chicago Bears | John Justice | Guard | Santa Clara |
| 350 | New York Giants | John Considine | Tackle | Purdue |
| 351 | Cleveland Browns | Bill Driver | Back | Florida State |

=== Round 30 ===
| Pick # | NFL team | Player | Position | College |
|---|---|---|---|---|
| 352 | Green Bay Packers | Ed Withers | Back | Wisconsin |
| 353 | San Francisco 49ers | Jerry Faske | Back | Iowa |
| 354 | Washington Redskins | Nick Bolkovac | Tackle | Pittsburgh |
| 355 | Chicago Cardinals | Leon Root | Back | Rutgers |
| 356 | Pittsburgh Steelers | John Gruble | End | Tennessee |
| 357 | Philadelphia Eagles | John Ford | Quarterback | Hardin–Simmons |
| 358 | Detroit Lions | Ron Horwath | Back | Detroit |
| 359 | New York Yanks | Joe Shinn | End | Tulane |
| 360 | Chicago Bears | Charley Butler | End | George Washington |
| 361 | Los Angeles Rams | Alvin Hanley | Back | Kentucky State |
| 362 | Cleveland Browns | Sisto Averno | Guard | Muhlenberg (Redrafted Colt) |

| = Pro Bowler | = Hall of Famer |

== Hall of Famers ==
- Jack Christiansen, defensive back from Colorado State University taken 6th round 69th pick by the Detroit Lions.

Inducted: Professional Football Hall of Fame class of 1970.

- Y. A. Tittle, quarterback from LSU taken 1st round 3rd overall by the San Francisco 49ers.

Inducted: Professional Football Hall of Fame class of 1971.

- Andy Robustelli, defensive end from the University of Bridgeport Taken in the 19th round 228th overall by the Los Angeles Rams.

Inducted: Professional Football Hall of Fame class of 1971.

- Bill George, linebacker from Wake Forest University taken 2nd round 23rd overall by the Chicago Bears.

Inducted: Professional Football Hall of Fame class of 1974.

- Mike McCormack, offensive tackle from the University of Kansas taken 3rd round 34th overall by the New York Yanks.

Inducted: Professional Football Hall of Fame class of 1984.

- Don Shula, back from John Carroll University taken 9th round 110th overall by the Cleveland Browns.

Inducted: Professional Football Hall of Fame class of 1997 as a coach, not a player.

- Jack Butler, cornerback from St.Bonaventure undrafted by the Pittsburgh Steelers.

Inducted: Professional Football Hall of Fame class of 2012.

- Dick Stanfel, guard from San Francisco taken 2nd round 19th overall by the Detroit Lions.

Inducted: Professional Football Hall of Fame class of 2016.

== Notable undrafted players ==
| ^{†} | = Pro Bowler | ‡ | = Hall of Famer |

| Original NFL team | Player | Pos. | College | Notes |
|---|---|---|---|---|
| Los Angeles Rams | Marvin Johnson | CB | San Jose State | |
| Pittsburgh Steelers | Jack Butler^{‡} | CB | St. Bonaventure | |
