= Bishop Strickland =

American football player (1927–1997)

No. 35
- Position: Fullback

Personal information
- Born: January 4, 1927; Mullins, South Carolina, U.S.
- Died: December 15, 1997 (aged 70)
- Listed height: 5 ft 10 in (1.78 m)
- Listed weight: 195 lb (88 kg)

Career information
- High school: Mullins
- College: South Carolina (1947–1950)
- NFL draft: 1951: 6th round, 64th overall pick

Career history
- San Francisco 49ers (1951)

Awards and highlights
- Second-team All-Southern (1949)
- Stats at Pro Football Reference

Frank Bishop Strickland (January 4, 1927 – December 15, 1997) was an American professional football fullback who played for the San Francisco 49ers of the National Football League (NFL). He played college football for the South Carolina Gamecocks and was selected by the 49ers in the sixth round of the 1951 NFL draft.

== Early life ==
Frank Bishop Strickland was born on January 4, 1927, in Mullins, South Carolina. He played high school football at Mullins High School. As a senior in 1946, he helped the team go undefeated with a 15–0 record and win the state title.

== College career ==
Strickland enrolled at the University of South Carolina to play college football for the Gamecocks. He was a four-year starter and letterman from 1947 to 1950 as a right halfback. He earned all-state honors all four seasons, and Associated Press second-team All-Southern Conference honors in 1949. At the conclusion of his college career, he played in the Senior Bowl and North–South Shrine Game. Strickland was inducted into the University of South Carolina Athletic Hall of Fame in 1975.

== Professional career ==
Strickland was selected by the San Francisco 49ers in the sixth round, with the 64th overall pick, of the 1951 NFL draft. He played in nine games for the 49ers during the 1951 season in a reserve role, recording 34 carries for 165 yards, two fumbles, one fumble recovery, and one kick return for 14 yards.

== Personal life ==
Strickland served in the United States Navy. He was later a homebuilder in North Augusta, South Carolina. He was president of the North Augusta Chamber of Commerce in 1966. Strickland died on December 15, 1997.
