= List of Chattanooga Mocs in the NFL draft =

This is a list of Chattanooga Mocs football players in the NFL draft. The Mocs play for University of Tennessee at Chattanooga.

== Key ==
| B | Back | K | Kicker | NT | Nose tackle |
| C | Center | LB | Linebacker | FB | Fullback |
| DB | Defensive back | P | Punter | HB | Halfback |
| DE | Defensive end | QB | Quarterback | WR | Wide receiver |
| DT | Defensive tackle | RB | Running back | G | Guard |
| E | End | T | Offensive tackle | TE | Tight end |

== Selections ==
| Year | Round | Pick | Overall | Player | Team | Position |
|---|---|---|---|---|---|---|
| 1940 | 13 | 5 | 115 | Jack Gregory | Cleveland Rams | T |
| 1942 | 19 | 7 | 177 | Wilson Elliott | Brooklyn Dodgers | T |
| 1946 | 8 | 5 | 65 | Gene Roberts | New York Giants | B |
| 1946 | 10 | 1 | 81 | Tom Barber | Chicago Cardinals | T |
| 1947 | 10 | 9 | 84 | Fred Mullis | New York Giants | B |
| 1948 | 8 | 1 | 56 | Ralph Hutchinson | New York Giants | T |
| 1951 | 25 | 11 | 302 | Chet Lagod | New York Giants | T |
| 1953 | 9 | 7 | 104 | Hal Ledyard | San Francisco 49ers | B |
| 1954 | 15 | 6 | 175 | Tom Drake | Pittsburgh Steelers | G |
| 1954 | 18 | 1 | 206 | Dick Young | Chicago Cardinals | B |
| 1954 | 27 | 5 | 318 | Dick Oniskey | Chicago Bears | C |
| 1955 | 26 | 7 | 308 | Abe Cohen | New York Giants | G |
| 1955 | 28 | 4 | 329 | Jack Spears | Green Bay Packers | T |
| 1958 | 27 | 1 | 314 | Will Lewis | Chicago Cardinals | B |
| 1959 | 7 | 3 | 75 | Jim Tucker | Chicago Bears | E |
| 1959 | 19 | 1 | 217 | Bill Butler | Green Bay Packers | B |
| 1959 | 21 | 7 | 247 | Johnny Green | Pittsburgh Steelers | QB |
| 1960 | 18 | 11 | 215 | Dan Sheehan | Baltimore Colts | T |
| 1961 | 9 | 1 | 113 | Dan Sheehan | Minnesota Vikings | T |
| 1963 | 17 | 7 | 231 | Ron Whaley | Washington Redskins | DB |
| 1963 | 18 | 10 | 248 | Jim Bradshaw | Pittsburgh Steelers | B |
| 1967 | 5 | 22 | 129 | Gary Tucker | Miami Dolphins | RB |
| 1969 | 15 | 13 | 377 | John Tysziewicz | Houston Oilers | G |
| 1972 | 10 | 10 | 244 | Harley Turner | New York Jets | DB |
| 1975 | 8 | 3 | 185 | Brent Adams | Atlanta Falcons | T |
| 1976 | 6 | 19 | 175 | Darnell Powell | Buffalo Bills | RB |
| 1976 | 9 | 10 | 247 | Mike Hogan | Philadelphia Eagles | RB |
| 1978 | 4 | 19 | 103 | Pete Pallara | Cleveland Browns | G |
| 1980 | 10 | 10 | 259 | Greg Cater | Buffalo Bills | P |
| 1982 | 11 | 7 | 286 | Curtis Rouse | Minnesota Vikings | G |
| 1984 | 12 | 3 | 311 | Lawrence Green | New York Giants | LB |
| 1989 | 4 | 17 | 101 | Travis McNeal | Seattle Seahawks | TE |
| 1989 | 12 | 6 | 313 | Tony Bowick | Atlanta Falcons | DT |
| 1991 | 4 | 25 | 108 | Tony Hill | Dallas Cowboys | DE |
| 1991 | 12 | 25 | 331 | Joe Brunson | Miami Dolphins | DT |
| 1992 | 6 | 1 | 141 | Shoun Habersham | Indianapolis Colts | WR |
| 1992 | 8 | 11 | 207 | Muhammad Shamsid-Deen | Seattle Seahawks | RB |
| 1992 | 11 | 19 | 299 | Pumpy Tudors | Philadelphia Eagles | P |
| 1996 | 3 | 28 | 89 | Terrell Owens | San Francisco 49ers | WR |
| 1996 | 6 | 28 | 195 | Marrio Grier | New England Patriots | RB |
| 2001 | 7 | 35 | 235 | Richmond Flowers | Jacksonville Jaguars | WR |
| 2001 | 7 | 43 | 243 | Terdell Sands | Kansas City Chiefs | DT |
| 2011 | 5 | 6 | 137 | Buster Skrine | Cleveland Browns | DB |
| 2012 | 7 | 36 | 243 | B. J. Coleman | Green Bay Packers | QB |
| 2015 | 5 | 12 | 148 | Davis Tull | New Orleans Saints | LB |
| 2017 | 6 | 34 | 217 | Corey Levin | Tennessee Titans | G |
| 2022 | 1 | 29 | 29 | Cole Strange | New England Patriots | G |
