= Dave Sparks =

American football player (1928–1954)

No. 39, 68
- Positions: Guard, tackle

Personal information
- Born: April 28, 1928; Arlington, Virginia, U.S.
- Died: December 7, 1954 (aged 26); Arlington, Virginia, U.S.
- Listed height: 6 ft 1 in (1.85 m)
- Listed weight: 220 lb (100 kg)

Career information
- High school: Lorain (Lorain, Ohio)
- College: South Carolina
- NFL draft: 1951: 15th round, 173rd overall pick

Career history
- San Francisco 49ers (1951); Washington Redskins (1954)

Awards and highlights
- Second-team All-SoCon (1950)

Career NFL statistics
- Fumble recoveries: 1
- Stats at Pro Football Reference

David Walter Sparks (April 28, 1928 – December 5, 1954) was an American professional football player. He played professionally as a guard and tackle in the National Football League (NFL) with the San Francisco 49ers in 1951 and the Washington Redskins in 1954. Sparks played college football at the University of North Carolina and was selected in the 15th round of the 1951 NFL draft by the 49ers.

Sparks died from a coronary thrombosis on December 5, 1954, at a friend's home in Arlington, Virginia just hours after playing for the Redskins against the Cleveland Browns.

== See also ==
- List of gridiron football players who died during their careers
