= Blaine Earon =

American football player (1929–2019)

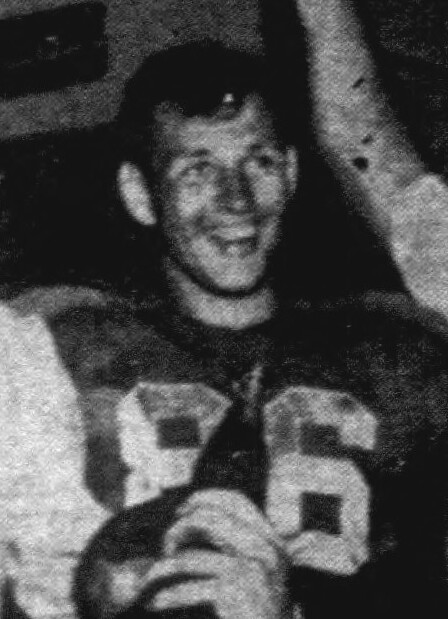
- Earon in 1953

No. 86
- Position: Defensive lineman

Personal information
- Born: January 15, 1929; Altoona, Pennsylvania, U.S.
- Died: June 3, 2019 (aged 90); Hoschton, Georgia, U.S.
- Listed height: 6 ft 1 in (1.85 m)
- Listed weight: 195 lb (88 kg)

Career information
- High school: Altoona Area
- College: Duke
- NFL draft: 1952: 19th round, 226th overall pick

Career history
- Detroit Lions (1952–1953)

Awards and highlights
- 2× NFL champion (1952, 1953); First-team All-American (1950); First-team All-SoCon (1950); Second-team All-SoCon (1949)

Career NFL statistics
- Games played: 18
- Games started: 0
- Fumble recoveries: 5
- Stats at Pro Football Reference

Blaine Allen Earon (January 15, 1929 – June 3, 2019) was an American professional football player who played as a defensive lineman in the National Football League (NFL). After playing college football for the Duke Blue Devils, Earon was selected by the Detroit Lions in the 19th round (226th overall) of the 1952 NFL draft. He played for the Detroit Lions in 1952 and 1953, both championship-winning seasons.
