= Austintown Local School District =

School district in Ohio, United States

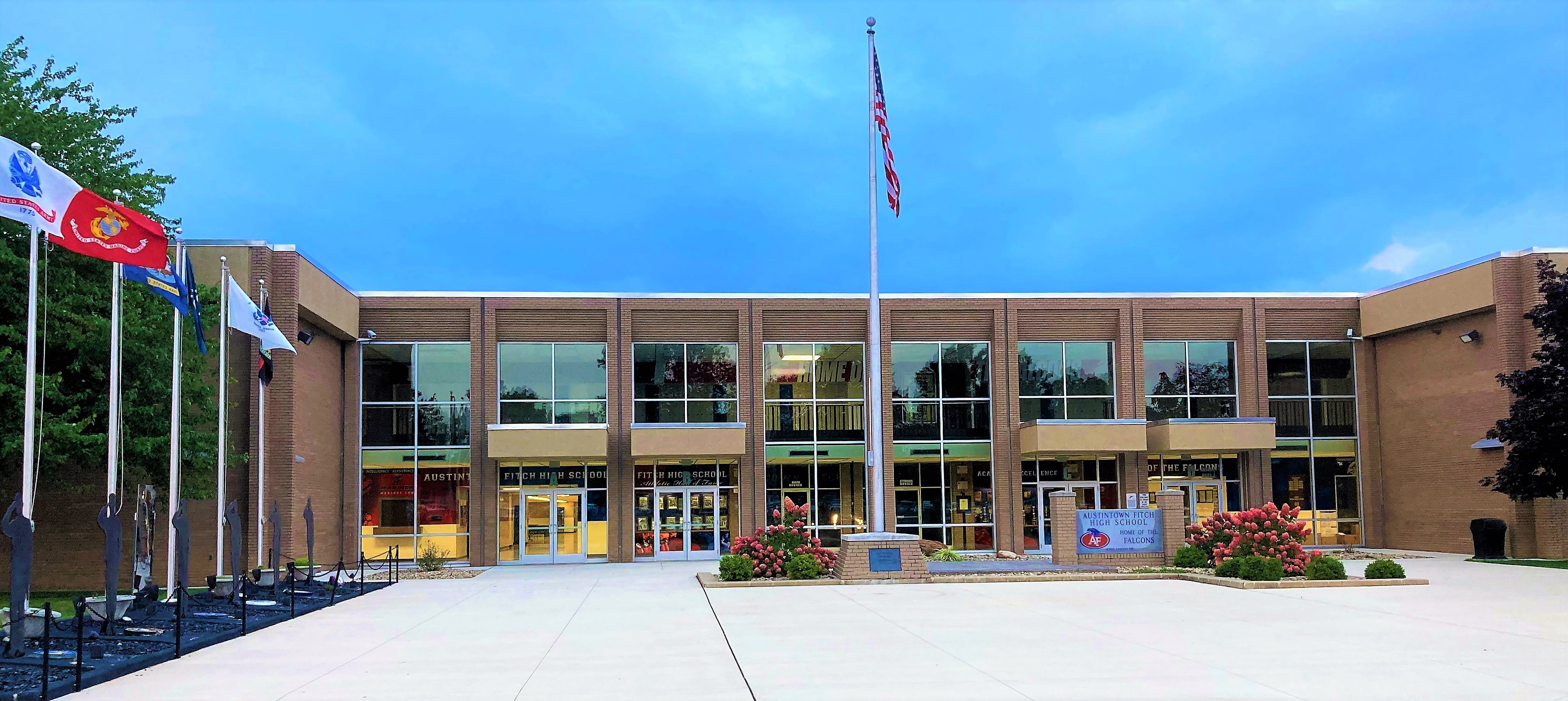

Address
- 700 South Raccoon Road Austintown, Ohio, 44515; United States

District information
- Type: Public, Coeducational
- Superintendent: Tim Kelty
- NCES District ID: 3904829

Students and staff
- Students: 4,112 (2025–2026)
- Teachers: 223.66 (on an FTE basis) (2025–2026)
- Staff: 298.58 (on an FTE basis) (2025–2026)
- Student–teacher ratio: 18.39 (2025–2026)
- Colors: Navy and Scarlet

Other information
- Website: www.austintownschools.org

The Austintown Local School District is a school district located in Austintown, Ohio, United States. The school district consists of one high school, one middle school and two elementary schools.

== History ==
The Austintown Local School District formed in 1916, following the consolidation of several smaller one-room schools. The district had built Austintown Centralized School, later changing the name to Austintown Fitch High School in 1924, to name it after John H. Fitch, who donated the land for the school site.

Between the late 1940s and into the early 1960s, several elementary and junior high schools were built such as Woodside, Lloyd, John Davis, Lynn Kirk, and Charles Watson Elementary Schools. Frank Ohl Junior High was built in 1961. The district enrollment at this time exceeded over 6,000 students.

Austintown Fitch High School moved into a new campus in 1968. Their old campus was later used a middle school until 2007. The former Mahoning Ave location was sold in 2016 to Mejier, who built a grocery store at the former location in 2025.

In the late 2000s and into early 2010s, Austintown Fitch closed several of its older middle schools due to declining enrollment. The built Austintown Middle School in 2007 and Austintown Elementary and Intermediate School in 2013, this was part of a roughly $50 million building project with support from the Ohio Facilities Construction Commission.

== Schools ==
=== High school ===
- Austintown Fitch High School

=== Middle school ===
- Austintown Middle School

=== Elementary schools ===
- Austintown Elementary School
- Austintown Intermediate School

=== Former schools ===
- Lynn Kirk School
- Lloyd School
- Charles G. Watson School
- Woodside School
- John Davis Elementary School
- Frank Ohl Junior High School
