= Redmond Finney =

Profile
- Position: Center

Personal information
- Born: October 19, 1929; Baltimore, Maryland
- Died: July 31, 2019 (aged 89); Mount Desert, Maine

Career information
- College: Princeton

Awards and highlights
- First-team All-American (1950); Second-team All-Eastern (1950)

Redmond Conyngham Stewart Finney Sr (October 19, 1929 – July 31, 2019) was an American football and lacrosse player, wrestler, athletic coach, teacher and headmaster. He was an All-American football and lacrosse player at Princeton during the 1950–1951 academic year. During the same academic year (his senior year), he was also captain of the wrestling team at Princeton. After graduating, Finney served in the Navy during the Korean War and later became a teacher, then headmaster at the Gilman School.

Finney played college football for the Princeton Tigers football team and was selected by both the Football Writers Association of America and the International News Service as a first-team player on their 1950 College Football All-America Teams. He turned down an invitation to play in the Blue–Gray Football Classic to work on a thesis titled "Protestantism and Catholicism in 19th Century America." Finney also played lacrosse at Princeton and was selected as an All-American in that sport in the spring of 1951. He was the first person to ever be named first team All-American in two sports in the same academic year; Jim Brown later became the second person to accomplish the feat.

Finney later worked as an athletic coach and teacher and subsequently became the headmaster at Gilman School in Baltimore, Maryland. He was a graduate of the School and a member of the class of 1947. He retired as headmaster of Gilman School in 1992.

Finney died in Mount Desert, Maine at the age of 89 on July 31, 2019.
