= George Hughes (American football) =

American football player (1925–2009)

No. 40, 65
- Positions: Tackle, guard

Personal information
- Born: August 19, 1925; Norfolk, Virginia, U.S.
- Died: February 5, 2009 (aged 83); Hampton, Virginia, U.S.
- Listed height: 6 ft 1 in (1.85 m)
- Listed weight: 225 lb (102 kg)

Career information
- High school: Maury (Norfolk)
- College: William & Mary (1946–1949)
- NFL draft: 1950: 3rd round, 34th overall pick

Career history

Playing
- Pittsburgh Steelers (1950–1954)

Coaching
- Norfolk Neptunes (1965) Offensive line coach; Norfolk Neptunes (1966-1967) Assistant coach; Norfolk Neptunes (1968-1970) Head coach; Norfolk Neptunes (1971) Assistant coach; Ottawa Rough Riders (1975–1978) Assistant coach; Ottawa Rough Riders (1979–1980) Offensive line coach

Awards and highlights
- 2× Pro Bowl (1951, 1953); Second-team All-SoCon (1949)

Career NFL statistics
- Games played: 60
- Games started: 58
- Fumble recoveries: 7
- Stats at Pro Football Reference

George Hughes (August 19, 1925 – February 5, 2009) was a guard who played five seasons in the National Football League (NFL) with the Pittsburgh Steelers. Hughes attended the College of William and Mary. He died February 5, 2009, at the VA Medical Center in Hampton.

Hughes was inducted into the Virginia Sports Hall of Fame in 1983.
