= 1949 Little All-America college football team =

American college football all-star team

The 1949 Little All-America college football team is composed of college football players from small colleges and universities who were selected by the Associated Press (AP) as the best players at each position. For 1949, the AP selected first, second, and third teams.

Back Eddie LeBaron of Pacific was chosen for the first team for the third consecutive year. Andy Robustelli, chosen as a third-team end, was later inducted into the Pro Football Hall of Fame.

== First-team ==
Position	Player	Team
B	Eddie LeBaron	Pacific
B	Brad Rowland	McMurry
B	William Young	Hillsdale
B	Conrad Callahan	Morningside
E	Claude Radtke	Lawrence
E	Charles Williams	Sam Houston State
T	Herbert McKinney	Missouri Valley
T	Elbert Hammett	Wofford
G	Vincent Sarratore	Chattanooga
G	Art Byrd	Western Carolina
C	Robert Numbers	Lehigh

== Second-team ==
Position	Player	Team
B	Roland Malcolm	Gustavus Adolphus
B	Wilford White	Arizona State
B	Robert Miller	Emory & Henry
B	Thomas Lucia	Louisville
E	Clifford Coggin	Mississippi Southern
E	John Gallagher	Delaware
T	Peter Wichowski	Wesleyan (CT)
T	William Bigham	Hardin
G	Warren Wood	Puget Sound
G	Joseph Lucas	St. Ambrose
C	Lambert Oberg	Trinity (CT)

== Third-team ==
Position	Player	Team
B	Dean Armstrong	RPI
B	Thomas Winbigler	College of Idaho
B	Robert McAvoy	Bowdoin
B	Howard Treesh	Hanover
E	Robert McChesney	Hardin–Simmons
E	Andy Robustelli	Arnold
T	Cecil Jackson	Juniata
T	Arnold Melvin	Elon
G	Vernon Quick	Wofford
G	Robert Gerhardt	Evansville
C	Harvey Moyer	Wofford

== See also ==
- 1949 College Football All-America Team
