= George Sulima =

American football player (1928–1987)

No. 88
- Positions: End, defensive end

Personal information
- Born: February 27, 1928; New Britain, Connecticut, U.S.
- Died: October 31, 1987 (aged 59); Colchester, Vermont, U.S.
- Listed height: 6 ft 2 in (1.88 m)
- Listed weight: 200 lb (91 kg)

Career information
- High school: New Britain
- College: Boston University (1947–1950)
- NFL draft: 1951: 3rd round, 31st overall pick

Career history
- Pittsburgh Steelers (1952–1954)

Awards and highlights
- Second-team All-Eastern (1950)

Career NFL statistics
- Receptions: 49
- Receiving yards: 746
- Touchdowns: 2
- Stats at Pro Football Reference

George Sulima (February 27, 1928 – October 31, 1987) was an American professional football end. He played for the Pittsburgh Steelers from 1952 to 1954. He was selected by the Steelers in the third round of the 1951 NFL draft with the 31st overall pick.
