= Elmer Wingate =

American football and lacrosse player (1928–2016)

No. 84
- Position: End

Personal information
- Born: October 26, 1928; Baltimore, Maryland, U.S.
- Died: February 27, 2016 (aged 87); Towson, Maryland, U.S.
- Listed height: 6 ft 3 in (1.91 m)
- Listed weight: 235 lb (107 kg)

Career information
- High school: Baltimore Polytechnic Institute
- College: Maryland (1947–1950)
- NFL draft: 1951: 4th round, 46th overall pick

Career history
- Baltimore Colts (1953)

Awards and highlights
- First-team All-SoCon (1950)
- Stats at Pro Football Reference

Elmer Horsey Wingate (October 26, 1928 – February 27, 2016) was an American football player. Wingate was drafted by the New York Yanks in the fourth round of the 1951 NFL draft and played for one season with the Baltimore Colts.

== Early life and college career ==
Wingate was born in 1928 in Baltimore, Maryland and attended high school at the Baltimore Polytechnic Institute. He then went on to college at the University of Maryland. While there, Wingate played football for the Maryland Terrapins as a defensive end. In 1947, he was the team's receiving leader with 12 receptions for 145 yards and three touchdowns. In 1948, Wingate repeated as the Terrapins' leader receiver with nine receptions for 32 yards and three touchdowns, and was named an honorable mention All-American. In 1950, Wingate was named to the All-Southern Conference team. At Maryland, Wingate also played on the lacrosse team as a defenseman in 1950 and 1951. He was named to the All-American second-team in 1951.

== Later life ==
He received a commission as a second lieutenant in the United States Air Force upon graduation from the University of Maryland as a member of the Air Force Reserve Officer Training Corps. While serving in the Air Force, he played football for the Bolling Air Force Base football team, where they won the service championship from 1952 to 1953. His service was during was during the Korean War era.

Wingate was selected in the fourth round of the 1951 NFL draft, 46th overall, by the New York Yanks. He eventually entered the league to play for the Baltimore Colts in 1953. While in the NFL, Wingate saw action in twelve games.
