= Wilford White =

American football player (1928–2013)

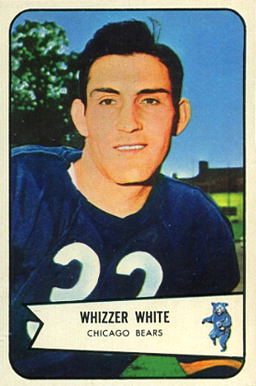
- White on a 1954 Bowman football card

No. 33, 90
- Position: Halfback

Personal information
- Born: September 26, 1928; Mesa, Arizona, U.S.
- Died: August 1, 2013 (aged 84); Phoenix, Arizona, U.S.
- Listed height: 5 ft 9 in (1.75 m)
- Listed weight: 172 lb (78 kg)

Career information
- High school: Mesa
- College: Arizona State (1947–1950)
- NFL draft: 1951: 3rd round, 36th overall pick

Career history
- Chicago Bears (1951–1952); Toronto Argonauts (1955)

Awards and highlights
- Second-team All-American (1950); All-Border (1950); Second-team Little All-American (1949); Arizona State Sun Devils No. 33 retired

Career NFL statistics
- Rushing yards: 67
- Rushing average: 2.4
- Receptions: 12
- Receiving yards: 197
- Total touchdowns: 2
- Stats at Pro Football Reference

Wilford Parley "Whizzer" White (September 26, 1928 – August 1, 2013) was an American professional football player who was a halfback for the Chicago Bears of the National Football League (NFL). He also was a member of the Toronto Argonauts in the Canadian Football League (CFL). He was selected by the Chicago Bears in the third round of the 1951 NFL draft. He played college football for the Arizona State Sun Devils and became the school's first College Football All-American.

== Early life ==
White was born in Mesa, Arizona. He attended Mesa High School, where he was a multi-sport athlete and a stand-out in track and field. In football, he received first-team All-State honors as a junior and senior.

He led his school to the state title in his final season, while rushing for 181 yards per game, which was a state record that lasted 46 years. He was known as "The Mesa Meteor" and "The Wizard of the Harmonica", until receiving the nickname "Whizzer" by the media.

== College career ==
White accepted a football scholarship from Arizona State University, leading the team in rushing from 1947 to 1950, with a total of 3,173 yards. In 1950, he had a season for the ages, his 1,502 yards rushing total (150.2 yards per game) led the nation and still ranks second in school history for a season. He also scored 22 touchdowns and 136 points, which ranked third in the nation and still are school single-season records. White was the second player in college football history to run for so many yards in a season, becoming the first football player from Arizona State University to be named All-American.

In 1951 White participated in the College All-Star Game and the East–West Shrine Game. He is considered one of the greatest running backs in school history, with many of his records still standing.

He also practiced basketball and the decathlon, where he finished fifth and sixth nationally as a junior and senior behind Olympian Bob Mathias. He was inducted into the Arizona State University Athletics Hall of Fame, the Sun Devil Ring of Honor and had his jersey number retired (33).

== Professional career ==
White was selected by the Chicago Bears in the third round (36th overall) of the 1951 NFL draft and played two seasons in the NFL, until suffering a knee injury.

Perhaps White's most famous play was when, as quarterback, White ran backwards over 48 yards when being pursued by Los Angeles Rams defenders. White ended up fumbling the ball at the one yard line, and a Rams defender recovered it and ran it in for a touchdown. In the NFL Films video, 100 Greatest Follies, White's play was named the #3 greatest folly of all time. His son, Danny White, said that he saw film of the play once when he was younger, then didn't see it again for years until NFL Films showed it to him. Danny joked that White was probably so embarrassed about the play that he obtained every possible copy of the play's film so that nobody would see it.

== Personal life ==
White's son Danny White was a Pro Bowl quarterback for the Dallas Cowboys and later head coach of the Arizona Rattlers of the Arena Football League. His grandson Max Hall also played quarterback in the NFL. On August 1, 2013, he died of a heart attack en route to a Phoenix-area hospital.

== See also ==
- List of NCAA major college football yearly rushing leaders
