= Wally Bell =

American baseball umpire (1965–2013)

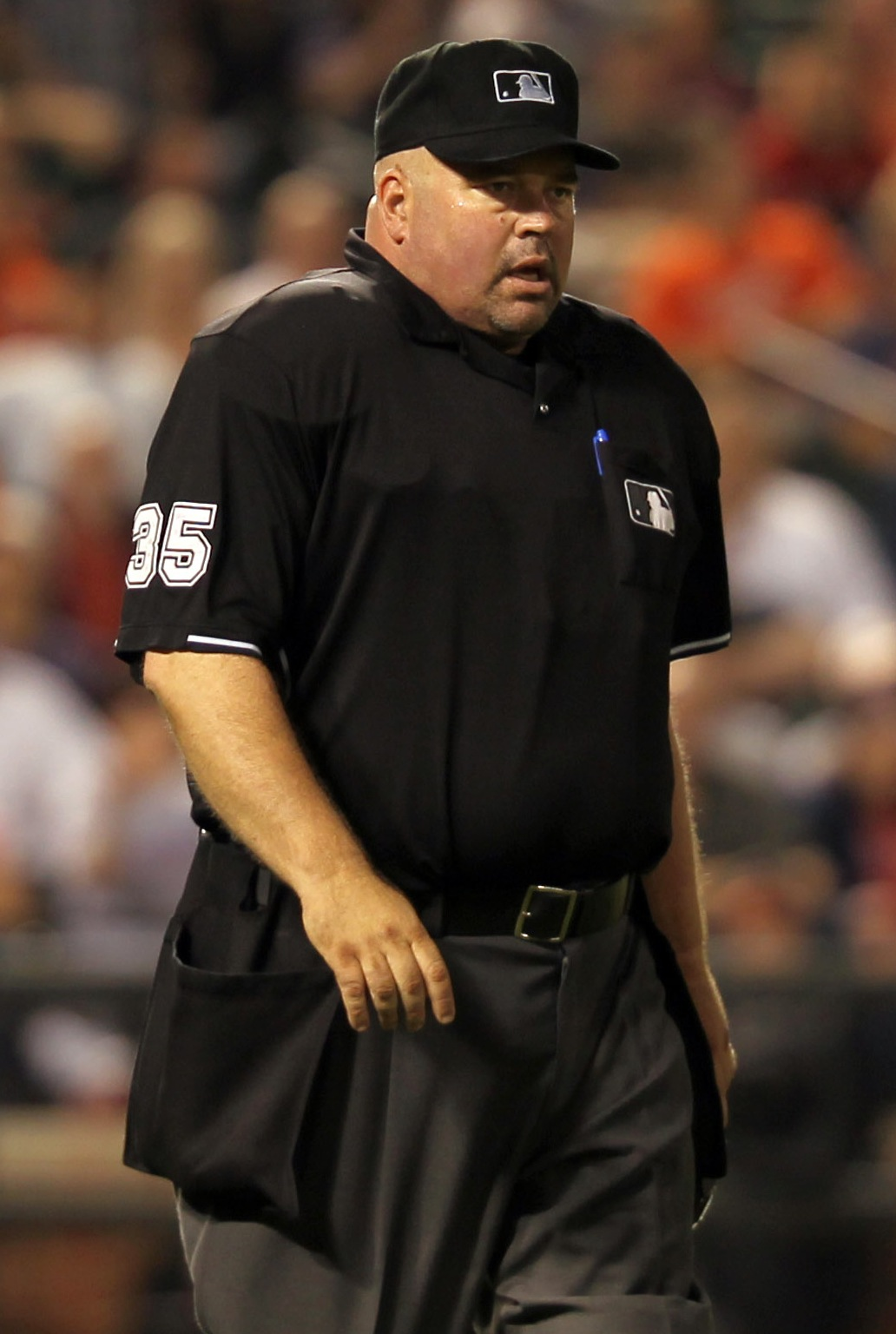
- Bell in 2011
- Born: January 10, 1965; Ravenna, Ohio, U.S.
- Died: October 14, 2013 (aged 48); Youngstown, Ohio, U.S.
- Education: Austintown-Fitch High School
- Occupation: MLB umpire
- Height: 6 ft 2 in (188 cm)

Wallace Robert Bell (January 10, 1965 – October 14, 2013) was an American umpire in Major League Baseball (MLB) who worked in the National League from 1992 to 1999 and in both major leagues from 2000 to 2013. He wore the number 36 while a National League umpire, then changed to 35 when the American League and National League staffs were merged in 2000. Tim McClelland wore number 36 longer and he claimed the number.

== Umpiring career ==
Bell graduated from Austintown-Fitch High School in 1983. He began umpiring Little League and summer league games when he was 17. Bell and fellow Austintown-Fitch graduate Brian O'Nora attended umpiring school together the next year. Both men became major league umpires. Bell umpired in the International League, Triple-A Alliance, Dominican Republic League, Southern League, Carolina League, South Atlantic League and New York–Penn League during his minor league career. He spent eight years in the minor leagues before being promoted to the majors in 1992.

After reaching the major leagues, Bell umpired in one World Series (2006), three All-Star Games (1997, 2000, 2013), seven Division Series (1998, 1999, 2003, 2004, 2006, 2012, 2013) and four League Championship Series (2000, 2001, 2005, 2010).

=== Notable games ===
Bell umpired the first game in New York City after the September 11, 2001 attacks. In Cleveland during the 2007 season, he was working during a triple play, which was turned from the third baseman to the second baseman to the first baseman. Bell was at first base when Barry Bonds broke MLB's all-time home run record on August 7, 2007. He was at third base on August 24, 2012, when Adrián Beltré of the Texas Rangers hit for the cycle against the Minnesota Twins. He was also at third base when the New York Yankees turned a 4-6-5-6-5-3-4 triple play against the Baltimore Orioles on April 12, 2013. One of his proudest moments was when he returned to the baseball diamond after open heart surgery in 1999.

== Death ==
Bell died of a heart attack on October 14, 2013, at an Ohio hospital. He was 48 years old. Wally is survived by a son and a daughter.

The last games he worked were the 2013 National League Division Series playoffs between the Pittsburgh Pirates and St. Louis Cardinals which ended the week before he died.

As a tribute, umpires wore a black and white "WB" patch on their uniform sleeves for Games 4 of both League Championship Series through the remainder of the 2013 postseason and 2014 season while a moment of silence was observed at Detroit's Comerica Park and Los Angeles' Dodger Stadium, host sites of Game 4 of the 2013 ALCS and NLCS. After Game 3 in Los Angeles, MLB Executive Vice President of Baseball Operations Joe Torre and NLCS crew chief Gerry Davis held a press conference to discuss Bell's death. As a 2013 Division Series umpire, Bell had been under consideration to work the 2013 World Series.

== See also ==
- List of Major League Baseball umpires (disambiguation)
