= Henry Minarik =

American football player (1927–2018)

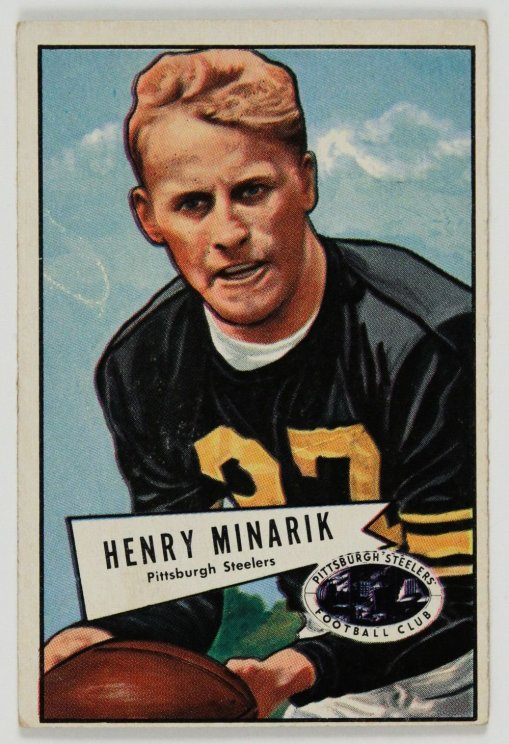
- Minarik on a 1952 Bowman football card

No. 37, 82
- Position: End

Personal information
- Born: September 1, 1927; Flint, Michigan, U.S.
- Died: March 12, 2018 (aged 90); Lake City, Michigan, U.S.
- Listed height: 6 ft 2 in (1.88 m)
- Listed weight: 200 lb (91 kg)

Career information
- High school: Central (Flint)
- College: Michigan State (1947–1950)
- NFL draft: 1951: 8th round, 92nd overall pick

Career history
- Pittsburgh Steelers (1951)

Career NFL statistics
- Receptions: 35
- Receiving yards: 459
- Touchdowns: 1
- Stats at Pro Football Reference

Henry John Minarik (September 1, 1927 – March 12, 2018) was an American professional football tackle who played for the Pittsburgh Steelers. He played college football at Michigan State University, having previously attended Central High School. He is a member of the Greater Flint Area Sports Hall of Fame.
