= Marvin Johnson (American football) =

American football player (1927–1981)

No. 27, 41
- Positions: Defensive back, halfback

Personal information
- Born: April 13, 1927; San Francisco, California, U.S.
- Died: February 8, 1981 (aged 53); Palo Alto, California, U.S.
- Listed height: 5 ft 11 in (1.80 m)
- Listed weight: 183 lb (83 kg)

Career information
- High school: Fremont (California)
- College: San Jose State
- NFL draft: 1951: undrafted

Career history
- Los Angeles Rams (1951–1952); Green Bay Packers (1952-1953)

Awards and highlights
- NFL champion (1951)

Career NFL statistics
- Interceptions: 6
- Fumble recoveries: 2
- Receptions: 2
- Receiving yards: 38
- Stats at Pro Football Reference

Marvin Leland Johnson (April 13, 1927 – February 8, 1981) was a player in the National Football League (NFL).

== Biography ==
Johnson was born Marvin Leland Johnson on April 13, 1927, in Orange, California. He died in Palo Alto in 1981.

== Career ==
Johnson played with the Los Angeles Rams during the 1951 NFL season. He later played with the Green Bay Packers during the 1953 NFL season after having split the previous season between the Rams and the Packers.

He played at the collegiate level at San Jose State University.
