= Ray Krouse =

American football player (1927–1966)

- Ray Krouse 1960 Topps trading card

No. 70, 78, 77
- Position: Defensive lineman

Personal information
- Born: March 21, 1927; Washington, D.C., U.S.
- Died: April 9, 1966 (aged 39); Georgetown, Washington, D.C., U.S.
- Listed height: 6 ft 3 in (1.91 m)
- Listed weight: 263 lb (119 kg)

Career information
- High school: Western (Washington, D.C.)
- College: Maryland (1947–1950)
- NFL draft: 1951: 2nd round, 25th overall pick

Career history
- New York Giants (1951–1955); Detroit Lions (1956–1957); Baltimore Colts (1958–1959); Washington Redskins (1960)

Awards and highlights
- 3× NFL champion (1957, 1958, 1959); 3× Second-team All-Pro (1954–1956); Pro Bowl (1954); Second-team All-American (1949); First-team All-SoCon (1949); 2× Second-team All-SoCon (1948, 1950)

Career NFL statistics
- Fumble recoveries: 6
- Stats at Pro Football Reference

Raymond Francis Krouse (March 21, 1927 – April 9, 1966) was an American professional football player who was a defensive lineman in the National Football League (NFL) for the New York Giants, Detroit Lions, Baltimore Colts and Washington Redskins. He played college football for the Maryland Terrapins.

== Early life ==
Krouse attended Western High School. He accepted a football scholarship from the University of Maryland, College Park.

During the World War II era, he served in the United States Navy reserves and was discharged as a Seaman 2nd Class.

In 1992, he was posthumously inducted into the University of Maryland Athletic Hall of Fame. The Ray Krouse Award is given to the team's most valuable player.

== Professional career ==
=== New York Giants ===
Krouse was selected by the New York Giants in the second round (25th overall) of the 1951 NFL draft. The 1951 Giants defense he was part of, allowed the fewest total yards and rushing yards in the NFL for that season.

In 1952, he had his best professional season. On April 26, 1956, he was traded to the Detroit Lions in exchange for defensive tackle Dick Modzelewski.

=== Detroit Lions ===
In 1957, he contributed to the Detroit Lions winning the NFL Championship. On July 17, 1958, he was traded to the Baltimore Colts in exchange for a third round draft choice (#36-Ron Luciano).

=== Baltimore Colts ===
Krouse was a part of the 1958 NFL Championship Game against the New York Giants, famously known as "The Greatest Game Ever Played". The 1958 Colts defense he was part of, allowed the fewest rushing yards in the NFL for that season.

He contributed to the Colts winning back to back NFL titles in 1958 and 1959 against his old team, the Giants.

=== Dallas Cowboys ===
Krouse was selected by the Dallas Cowboys in the 1960 NFL expansion draft. On June 23, he was traded to the Washington Redskins in exchange for center Frank Kuchta.

=== Washington Redskins ===
Krouse played one season for the Washington Redskins.

== Personal life ==
The Washington Post on April 10, 1966, said, "Raymond Francis Krouse, one of the finest athletes ever to come out of Washington, died yesterday at Georgetown University Hospital of a liver ailment." He left behind a wife, Majorie; four daughters (Karen, 14, Kimberly, 8, Carolyn, 5, and Kathy, 4 [ages at the time of his burial]); his mother, Mrs. Josephine Krouse; a sister, Mrs. Margaret Haney; and a brother, William (Sully) Krouse. He was buried on April 13, 1966, at Arlington National Cemetery nearby his son, David Edward, who died in 1963, after living two days.
