= Carl Taseff =

American football player and coach (1928–2005)

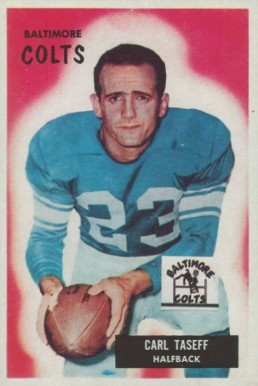
- Taseff on a 1955 Bowman football card

No. 98, 23
- Positions: Cornerback, halfback

Personal information
- Born: September 28, 1928; Parma, Ohio, U.S.
- Died: February 27, 2005 (aged 76); Weston, Florida, U.S.
- Listed height: 5 ft 11 in (1.80 m)
- Listed weight: 192 lb (87 kg)

Career information
- High school: East (Cleveland, Ohio)
- College: John Carroll (1947–1950)
- NFL draft: 1951: 22nd round, 267th overall pick

Career history

Playing
- Cleveland Browns (1951); Baltimore Colts (1953–1961); Philadelphia Eagles (1961); Buffalo Bills (1962)

Coaching
- Harrisburg Capitols (1963) Assistant coach; Boston Patriots (1964) Defensive backs coach; Detroit Lions (1965–1966) Defensive backs coach; Miami Dolphins (1970–1992) Running backs coach; Miami Dolphins (1975–1982) Special teams coach; Miami Dolphins (1993) Special assistant

Awards and highlights
- As a player: 2× NFL champion (1958, 1959); Second-team All-Pro (1958); First-team Little All-American (1950); As a coach: 2× Super Bowl champion (VII, VIII)

Career NFL/AFL statistics
- Rushing yards: 283
- Rushing average: 4.7
- Receptions: 19
- Receiving yards: 193
- Total touchdowns: 8
- Stats at Pro Football Reference

Carl N. "Gaucho" Taseff (September 28, 1928 – February 27, 2005) was an American professional football player and coach in the National Football League (NFL) and American Football League (AFL). Taseff had an 11-year playing career, primarily with the Baltimore Colts, where he was a member of the 1958 and 1959 NFL Championship winning teams. Taseff then coached for 27 seasons, winning Super Bowl VII and Super Bowl VIII as part of the Miami Dolphins coaching staff.

== Early life ==
Carl Taseff was born on September 28, 1928, in Parma, Ohio. Taseff attended East High School in Cleveland, Ohio, where he played football and basketball.

== College career ==
Tassef attended John Carroll University in University Heights, Ohio, a suburb of Cleveland, where he was a roommate and college football teammate of future Pro Football Hall of Fame coach Don Shula. Taseff starred on both the football and basketball team.

In football, Taseff played halfback. He was a four year varsity letterman, and earned numerous awards and accolades during his college career. He was named to the All-Big Four team (1947-1950), AP All-Ohio team (1947-1950), All-Ohio Conference (1947-1948), and the 1950 Little All-America college football team. Taseff rushed for 3,829 yards and 60 touchdowns while at John Carroll. During the 1950 season, Taseff was the second highest scorer in the nation for all colleges.

Taseff was enshrined in the John Carroll University Athletics Hall of Fame in 1968.

== Professional career ==
=== Cleveland Browns (1951) ===
Taseff was drafted 267th overall in the 22nd round of the 1951 NFL draft by the Cleveland Browns, who had also selected Shula in the ninth round. Both men made the team and were the only two rookies on the roster that year. Taseff was used sparingly as a rusher and receiver on offense and an occasional kick return man, as the Browns finished the season with a 11—1 win–loss record and advanced to the 1951 NFL Championship Game, which they lost to the Los Angeles Rams. The Browns released Taseff on waivers prior to the regular season, but he went unclaimed and the team added him to the roster when halfback Don Phelps was injured.

=== Baltimore Colts (1953-1961) ===
On March 25, 1953, Taseff was involved in a massive 15 player trade with the Baltimore Colts — a 10 player-for-5 player swap of contracts. Joining Taseff in making the move from the Browns to the expansion Colts were such future starters as defensive backs Don Shula and Bert Rechichar, end Art Spinney, and veteran guard Ed Sharkey. Taseff had a successful nine year career with the Colts.

Taseff's best season on offense came in 1954, where he rushed for 41 attempts and 228 yards. In 1956, Taseff led the NFL in punt returns (23), punt return yards (233), and punt return touchdowns (1). His longest return of that season went for 90 yards.

On defense, his best season was in 1958. Taseff recorded seven interceptions and had two fumble recoveries while also leading the league in punt returns with 29. The Colts advanced to the 1958 NFL Championship game, defeating the New York Giants in overtime.

The Colts repeated as NFL Champions in 1959, and Taseff was again a contributing member of the Colts defense. That season, Taseff set an NFL record by returning a blocked field goal 99 yards for a touchdown in a 45-26 victory over the Los Angeles Rams in the final week of the regular season.

=== Philadelphia Eagles (1961) ===
Taseff was signed by the Philadelphia Eagles in the middle of the 1961 season after being cut by the Colts. He appeared in five games for the Eagles, mainly returning punts.

=== Buffalo Bills (1962) ===
Taseff finished his professional playing career in 1962 with the Buffalo Bills of the AFL. Taseff appeared in 11 games with Buffalo and recorded two interceptions.

== Coaching career ==
After retiring as a player, Taseff became a defensive backs coach with the Boston Patriots of the American Football League. He spent one season in Boston before being named to the same position with the Detroit Lions, where he coached from 1965-1966.

After a three-year coaching hiatus, Taseff joined his former teammate and coach, Don Shula, with the Miami Dolphins. Taseff was the running backs coach for the Dolphins from 1970-1992, while also taking on the Special Teams Coordinator role from 1975-1982. In 1993, Taseff served as the Dolphins special assistant for one season before retiring from coaching.

Taseff was a member of the Dolphins coaching staff during their 1972 perfect season, which ended in a victory against the Washington Redskins in Super Bowl VII. The Dolphins repeated as Super Bowl champions in 1973. Taseff coached running backs such as future Pro Football Hall of Fame member Larry Csonka, Jim Kiick, and Mercury Morris.

== Death ==
Taseff suffered from a disease known as progressive supranuclear palsy, which weakened his immune system. At the end of January 2005, Taseff caught the common cold that eventually developed into pneumonia. Taseff died of pneumonia on February 27, 2005.
