= Joe McCutcheon =

American gridiron football player and coach (1929–2004)

Biographical details
- Born: June 10, 1929; Webster Springs, West Virginia, U.S.
- Died: July 27, 2004 (aged 75); Richmond, Virginia, U.S.

Playing career
- 1947–1950: Washington & Lee
- 1953: Montreal Alouettes
- Positions: Center, linebacker

Coaching career (HC unless noted)
- 1958–1963: Randolph–Macon

Head coaching record
- Overall: 22–27–3

Accomplishments and honors

Championships
- 2 Mason–Dixon (1958, 1960); 3 Virginia Little Eight (1958–1960)

Awards
- Second-team All-SoCon (1950)

Joseph Baker McCutcheon (June 10, 1929 – July 27, 2004) was an American gridiron football player and coach. He served as the head football coach at Randolph–Macon College in Ashland, Virginia from 1958 to 1963, compiling a recorder of 22–27–3. McCutcheon was a star football player at Washington & Lee University in Lexington, Virginia. He was selected by the Pittsburgh Steelers in the 11th round of the 1951 NFL draft.

== Head coaching record ==
| Year | Team | Overall | Conference | Standing | Bowl/playoffs |
|---|---|---|---|---|---|
Randolph–Macon Yellow Jackets (Mason–Dixon Conference) (1958–1963)
| 1958 | Randolph–Macon | 5–4 | 5–0 | 1st | |
| 1959 | Randolph–Macon | 4–2–3 | 2–2–1 | 4th | |
| 1960 | Randolph–Macon | 4–4 | 3–1 | T–1st | |
| 1961 | Randolph–Macon | 4–5 | 1–2 | 5th | |
| 1962 | Randolph–Macon | 2–6 | 0–3 | T–4th | |
| 1963 | Randolph–Macon | 3–6 | 1–3 | 4th | |
| Randolph–Macon: | | 22–27–3 | 12–11–1 | | |
| Total: | | 22–27–3 | | | |
National championship Conference title Conference division title or championship game berth
