= 1949 All-Southern Conference football team =

The 1949 All-Southern Conference football team consists of American football players chosen by the Associated Press (AP) and United Press (UP) for the All-Southern Conference football team for the 1949 college football season.

== All-Southern Conference selections ==
=== Backs ===
- Charlie Justice, North Carolina (AP-1; UP-1)
- Bill Gregus, Wake Forest (AP-1; UP-1)
- Fred Cone, Clemson (AP-2; UP-1)
- Bill Cox, Duke (AP-1)
- Joseph "Buddy" Lex, William & Mary (AP-1)
- Ray Mathews, Clemson (AP-2)
- Jack Cloud, William & Mary (AP-2)
- Bishop Strickland, South Carolina (AP-2)

=== Ends ===
- Art Weiner, North Carolina (AP-1; UP-1)
- Vito Ragazzo, William & Mary (AP-1; UP-1)
- Red O'Quinn, Wake Forest (AP-2)
- Blaine Earon, Duke (AP-2)

=== Tackles ===
- Lou Allen, Duke (AP-1; UP-1)
- Ray Krouse, Maryland (AP-1; UP-1)
- Lou Creekmur, William & Mary (AP-2)
- Elmer Costa, North Carolina State (AP-2)

=== Guards ===
- Ray Cicia, Wake Forest (AP-1; UP-1)
- Charles Musser, North Carolina State (AP-1; UP-1)
- George Hughes, William & Mary (AP-2)
- Bob Ward, Maryland (AP-2)

=== Centers ===
- Irv Holdash, North Carolina (AP-1; UP-1)
- Gene Moore, Clemson (AP-2)

== Key ==
AP = Associated Press
UP = United Press

== See also ==
- 1949 College Football All-America Team
