= Jim Staton =

American football player (1927–1993)

No. 72, 63
- Position: Defensive tackle

Personal information
- Born: May 23, 1927; Ansonville, North Carolina, U.S.
- Died: September 16, 1993 (aged 66); Greensboro, North Carolina, U.S.
- Listed height: 6 ft 4 in (1.93 m)
- Listed weight: 246 lb (112 kg)

Career information
- High school: Greensboro
- College: Wake Forest (1947–1950)
- NFL draft: 1951: 2nd round, 21st overall pick

Career history
- Washington Redskins (1951); Montreal Alouettes (1952–1956)

Awards and highlights
- 2× IRFU All-Star - 1952, 1954; Second-team All-American (1950); First-team All-SoCon (1950)

Career NFL statistics
- Games played: 8
- Stats at Pro Football Reference

James Brooks Staton Jr. (May 23, 1927 – September 16, 1993) was an American professional football defensive tackle in the National Football League (NFL) for the Washington Redskins. He played college football at Wake Forest University and was drafted in the second round of the 1951 NFL draft.

His greatest success came in Canadian football as a member of the Montreal Alouettes, where he played for five seasons (49 regular season games) and was selected an All-Star twice.
