= Bernie Custis =

American and Canadian football player (1928–2017)

No. 99
- Positions: Running back, Quarterback

Personal information
- Born: September 23, 1928; Philadelphia, Pennsylvania, U.S.
- Died: February 23, 2017 (aged 88); Burlington, Ontario, Canada

Career information
- High school: John Bartram (Philadelphia)
- College: Syracuse University

Career history

Playing
- 1951–1954: Hamilton Tiger-Cats
- 1955–1956: Ottawa Rough Riders

Coaching
- 1958: Tip Tops (Jr)
- 1959: East York Argonaught (Jr)
- 1960–1963: Oakville Black Knights (Jr)
- 1964–1972: Burlington Braves (Jr)
- 1973–1980: Sheridan College
- 1981–1988: McMaster University

Awards and highlights
- Grey Cup champion (1953); Second-team All-Eastern (1950)
- Canadian Football Hall of Fame (Class of 1998)

Bernard Eugene Custis (September 23, 1928 – February 23, 2017) was an American and Canadian football player who went on to a distinguished coaching career. He is known for having been the first black professional quarterback in the modern era and first in professional Canadian football, starting for the Hamilton Tiger-Cats in 1951.

In 2019, Bernie Custis Secondary School officially opened in Hamilton, Ontario. The school is located adjacent to Tim Hortons Field (and formerly Ivor Wynne Stadium), home site of the Tiger-Cats and Bernie's first professional games.

== Early life ==
Custis was born in Philadelphia in 1928, and graduated from John Bartram High School in Philadelphia in 1947. He excelled in track in high school.

== College playing career ==
Custis was a star quarterback for the Syracuse Orange football in 1948, 1949 and 1950, setting numerous Syracuse records that would last for decades. Custis was recruited by Coach Reaves Baysinger, who was replaced by Ben Schwartzwalder after a 1–8 season. He played the first two seasons of the Coach Schwartzwalder's 25-year tenure at Syracuse. The team went 4–5 in 1949 and 5–5 in 1950.

Custis was awarded the Syracuse Football team's Most Valuable Player trophy for the 1948 season.

Custis roomed with Al Davis, the future coach and owner of the Oakland Raiders, at Syracuse.

=== Syracuse passing statistics ===
Year	Yards	Comp.	Att.	Pct.	TDs	Int.	Pass Eff.
1948	721	52	131	39.7	3	14	72.1
1949	1,121	70	134	52.2	6	9	123.9
1950	775	74	159	46.5	3	9	82.3
Totals	2,617	196	424	46.2	12	32	97.3

== Professional playing career ==
=== National Football League ===
He was selected in the eleventh round of the 1951 NFL draft by the Cleveland Browns. As the Browns already had eventual Pro Football Hall of Famer Otto Graham as their starting quarterback at the time, Custis stood no chance of becoming a starting quarterback (the NFL, although it had recently begun accepting black players again, had also not had a black quarterback in three decades), and the Browns offered Custis a chance to play safety instead. When Custis refused, the Browns then offered to release him, on the condition that he would not play for another NFL team.

=== Canadian football ===
Custis chose to sign with the Hamilton Tiger-Cats of the Big Four (Interprovincial Rugby Football Union) the league that would form the eastern division of the Canadian Football League in 1958

Custis started at quarterback for Hamilton in 1951, becoming the first black player to play quarterback in Canadian professional football. He started every game for Hamilton in 1951, in both the regular season and playoffs, which finished with a 7–5 record. They won their first-round playoff game 24–7 over Toronto in Toronto. They lost in the Eastern finals to Ottawa 9–11 in front of a sell-out crowd of over 17,000 at Hamilton Civic Stadium. Custis was named to the IRFU All Star team as a quarterback in 1951.

Despite being an All-Star at quarterback, he was switched to running back in 1952, where he was also a successful player. The 1952 Tiger-Cats had an outstanding regular season, finishing 9–2–1, but lost in the IRFU playoff series to Toronto, 2 games to 1.

In 1953, Custis played for Hamilton in their victory in the 41st Grey Cup game, the Canadian pro football championship game, defeating the Winnipeg Blue Bombers 12–6.

Custis finished his professional career with the Ottawa Rough Riders, playing running back in 1955 and 1956.

== Coaching career ==
After the end of his professional career, he stayed in Canada and began a career as a teacher and elementary school principal. At the same time, he coached junior level football, most notably with the Oakville Black Knights and Burlington Braves of the Canadian Junior Football League (CJFL). At Burlington, he coached future Canadian Football Hall of Fame player Tony Gabriel.

From 1973 to 1980, he served as a head coach at Sheridan College. During his tenure, his record was 86–14, winning six consecutive Eastern College Championships from 1973 to 1978.

In 1981, he accepted the head coach position at McMaster University. In his second year with the Marauders, he improved the team's standing from seventh to first place. Over eight seasons he led the Marauders to a 31–23–1 record. He was named the OUAA Coach of the Year in 1982 and 1984 and was named CIAU Coach of the Year in 1982. He was inducted into the McMaster Athletic Hall of Fame in 2000.

In 1998, he was inducted into the Canadian Football Hall of Fame as a "builder" for his contributions to junior and college football in Canada.

== Legacy ==
In 2019 Bernie Custis Secondary School was opened in Hamilton, Ontario. The school's mascot is the Tiger as a nod to Custis' tenure on the Hamilton Tiger-Cats.

== Highlights and honors ==
=== As a player ===
- IRFU (Canadian League) All Star 1951 as Quarterback
- IRFU (Canadian League) All Star 1954 as Running Back
- 1953 Grey Cup Winners (Canadian Football Championship)
- Syracuse University Athletic Hall of Fame (1977 Inductee)

=== As a coach ===
- All-Star Coach 1975, 1977, 1978
- OUAA Coach of the Year 1982, 1983, 1984, 1985
- CIAU Coach of the Year (Frank Tindall Trophy) 1982
- Canadian Football Hall of Fame (1998 Inductee)
- McMaster University Hall of Fame (2000 Inductee)

== See also ==
- Racial issues faced by black quarterbacks
- List of black quarterbacks
- List of Grey Cup champions
