= 1950 Little All-America college football team =

American college football all-star team

The 1950 Little All-America college football team is composed of college football players from small colleges and universities who were selected by the Associated Press (AP) as the best players at each position. For 1950, the AP selected first and second teams.

== First team ==
Position	Player	Team
B	Brad Rowland	McMurry
B	Carl Taseff	John Carroll
B	Richard Doyne	Lehigh
B	Robert Miller	Emory & Henry
E	Norb Hecker	Baldwin Wallace
E	Benard Calendar	Louisiana College
T	Sal Gero	Elon
T	Cal Roberts	Gustavus Adolphus
G	Jack Hawkins	Central Washington
G	Ed Douglas	New Hampshire
C	Charles Cope	Franklin & Marshall

== Second team ==
Position	Player	Team
B	John Ford	Hardin–Simmons
B	Joseph Pahr	Valparaiso
B	John Phillips	Mississippi Southern
B	Everett Tiland	Western Washington
E	Richard Forbes	St. Ambrose
E	Charles Sanger	Kansas State Teachers
T	Bozo Weir	Presbyterian
T	Tom Staszak	Drexel
G	E. J. Moore	Abilene Christian
G	Leon McCoy	Morris Harvey
C	Richard Daniels	Pacific Lutheran

== See also ==
- 1950 College Football All-America Team
