= Irv Holdash =

American football player (1929–1992)

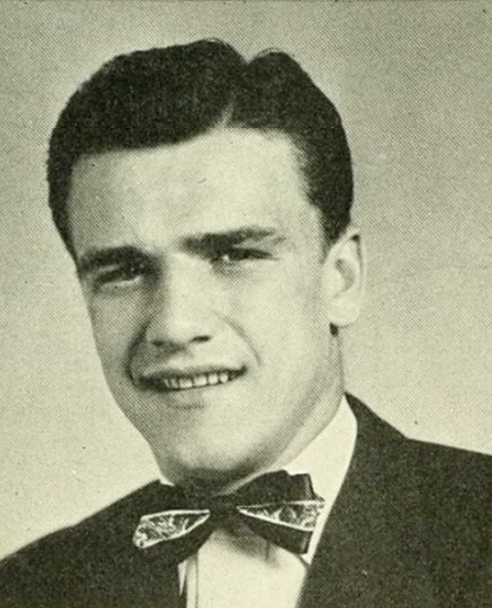
- Holdash from 1951 Yackety Yack

No. 25
- Positions: Center, Linebacker

Personal information
- Born: September 19, 1929; Austintown, Ohio, U.S.
- Died: December 18, 1992 (aged 63); Shrewsbury, Massachusetts, U.S.

Career information
- High school: Austintown-Fitch
- College: North Carolina (1948–1950)

Career history
- Cleveland Browns (1951-1954); Winnipeg Blue Bombers (1954)

Awards and highlights
- First-team All-American (1950); 2× First-team All-SoCon (1949, 1950); North Carolina Tar Heels Jersey No. 25 honored

Irvin J. Holdash (September 19, 1929 – December 18, 1992), sometimes known by the nickname "Huck", was an American football player. He grew up in Austintown, Ohio, and played college football for the North Carolina Tar Heels football team at the center and linebacker positions from 1948 to 1950. He was selected by the All-America Board as a first-team center and by the Associated Press as a first-team linebacker on the 1950 College Football All-America Team. He was selected by the Cleveland Browns with the 82nd pick in the 1951 NFL draft, but instead joined the United States Army where he served for two years. He later worked for many years for Norton Company as a packaging engineer.
