= Austintown Fitch High School =

American public high school

Fitch High School

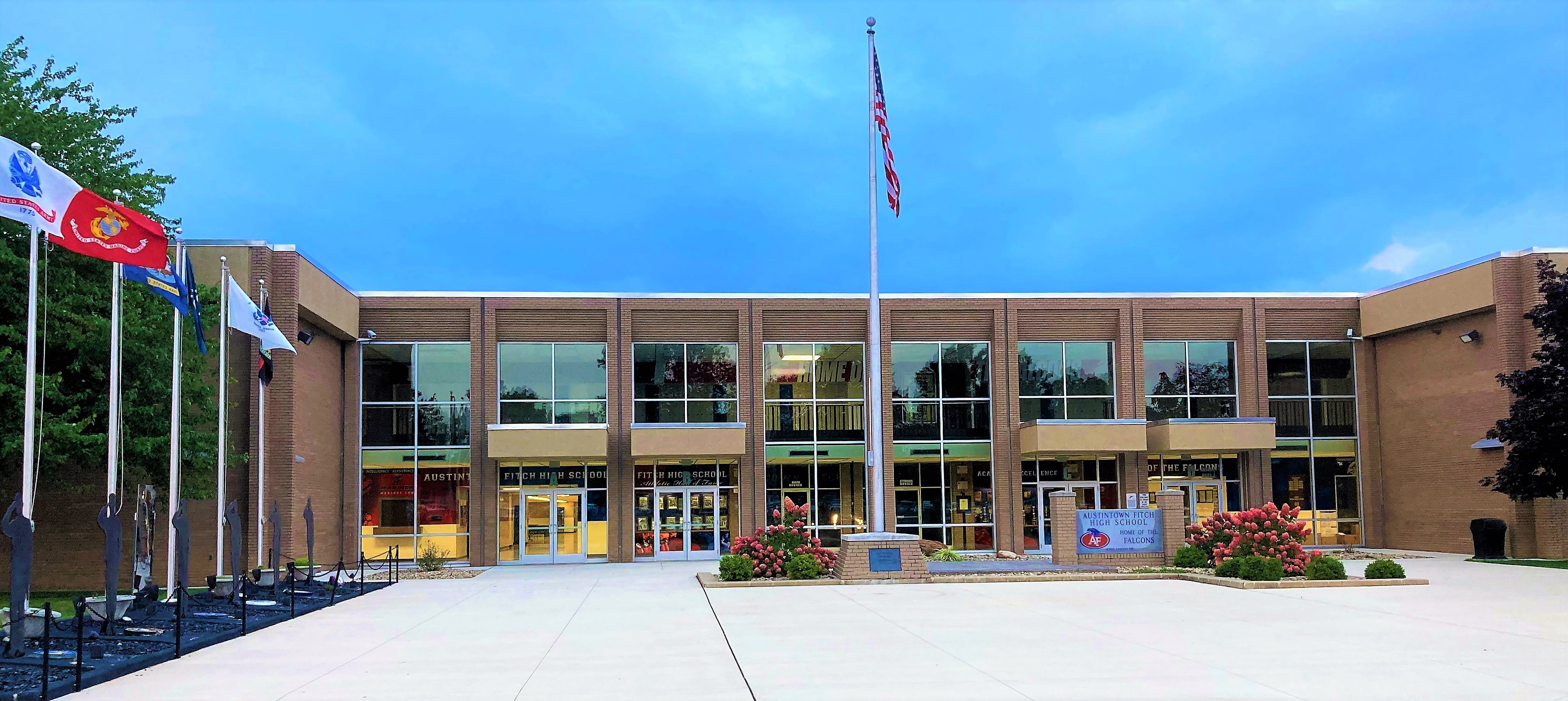

Location
- 4560 Falcon Drive; Ohio; Austintown, Ohio 44515; United States
- 41°5′31″N 80°44′20″W

Information
- Type: Public, Coeducational
- Established: 1916
- School district: Austintown Local School District
- CEEB code: 365695
- NCES School ID: 390482903189
- Principal: Salvatore Maiorana
- Teaching staff: 67.41 (on an FTE basis)
- Grades: 9–12
- Enrollment: 1,235 (2024–25)
- Student to teacher ratio: 18.32
- Campus type: Large Suburb
- Colors: Navy blue and Scarlet
- Athletics conference: All-American Conference
- Team name: Falcons
- Newspaper: The Talon
- Yearbook: The Reflector
- Website: afhs.austintownschools.org

Fitch High School (commonly referred to as Austintown Fitch High School) is a public high school located Austintown, Ohio, United States. It is the only high school in the Austintown Local School District. Athletic teams are known as the Falcons as a member of the Ohio High School Athletic Association in the All-American Conference.

== History ==
Austintown Fitch High School opened in 1916 following the consolidation of several smaller one-room schools. The district had built Austintown Centralized School, later changing the name to Austintown Fitch High School in 1924, to name it after John H. Fitch, who donated the land for the school site.

The original campus was located at 5680 Mahoning Avenue. Classes moved to the current high school campus in 1968, with the original campus later being used as a middle school until 2007. The original campus has since been demolished and turned into a Mejier in 2025.

== Athletics ==
=== State championships ===
- Boys basketball – 1931
- Boys bowling – 2002, 2003
- Girls bowling – 2003
- Boys cross country – 1971, 1972, 1975,
- Softball – 2023, 2024

== Notable alumni ==
- Irv Holdash – former college football player
- Donna Roberts – '62, convicted of the murder of her ex-husband
- Phil Keaggy – musician
- Mike Calhoun – former professional football player in the National Football League (NFL)
- Mike Trgovac – former professional football player and coach in the National Football League (NFL)
- Wally Bell – former umpire in Major League Baseball (MLB)
- Jeff Wilkins – former professional football player in the National Football League (NFL)
- Mike McGlynn – former professional football player in the National Football League (NFL)
- Billy Price - professional football player in the National Football League (NFL)
