= Ken Huxhold =

American football player (born 1929)

No. 63
- Position: Guard

Personal information
- Born: August 10, 1929; Kenosha, Wisconsin, U.S.
- Died: December 7, 2020 (aged 91); Madison, Wisconsin, U.S.
- Listed height: 6 ft 1 in (1.85 m)
- Listed weight: 226 lb (103 kg)

Career information
- High school: Kenosha
- College: Wisconsin (1947–1950)
- NFL draft: 1951: 27th round, 319th overall pick

Career history
- Philadelphia Eagles (1954–1958)

Awards and highlights
- Second-team All-Big Ten (1950)

Career NFL statistics
- Games played: 59
- Games started: 39
- Fumble recoveries: 2
- Stats at Pro Football Reference

Kenneth Wayne Huxhold (August 10, 1929 – December 7, 2020) was a player in the National Football League (NFL) for the Philadelphia Eagles from 1954 to 1958 as a guard. Huxhold was previously drafted in the 27th round of the 1951 NFL draft by the Chicago Cardinals. He played at the collegiate level at the University of Wisconsin–Madison.

== Biography ==
Huxhold was born Kenneth Wayne Huxhold on August 10, 1929, in Kenosha, Wisconsin. He retired from professional football in 1959 and started working for the International Paper company.

== See also ==
- List of Philadelphia Eagles players
