= Brad Rowland =

American football player (1929–2017)

No. 86
- Position: Halfback

Personal information
- Born: July 14, 1929; Hamlin, Texas, U.S.
- Died: September 20, 2017 (aged 88)
- Listed height: 6 ft 1 in (1.85 m)
- Listed weight: 190 lb (86 kg)

Career information
- High school: Hamlin
- College: McMurry (1947–1950)
- NFL draft: 1951: 5th round, 60th overall pick

Career history
- Chicago Bears (1951)

Awards and highlights
- 2× First-team Little All-American (1949, 1950)

Career NFL statistics
- Rushing yards: 50
- Rushing average: 5
- Stats at Pro Football Reference
- College Football Hall of Fame

Andrew Bradford Rowland (July 14, 1929 – September 20, 2017) was an American professional football player who was a halfback for the Chicago Bears of the National Football League (NFL). He was twice an All-American at McMurry University. Rowland played one season with the Bears. He was inducted into the College Football Hall of Fame in 2008. Rowland died on September 20, 2017, at the age of 88.
