= Xavier Legette =

American football player (born 2001)

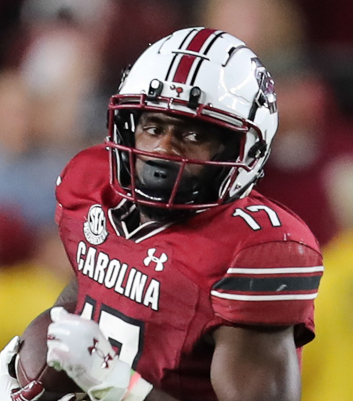
- Legette with the South Carolina Gamecocks in 2023

No. 17 – Carolina Panthers
- Position: Wide receiver
- Roster status: Active

Personal information
- Born: January 29, 2001 (age 25); Mullins, South Carolina, U.S.
- Listed height: 6 ft 3 in (1.91 m)
- Listed weight: 218 lb (99 kg)

Career information
- High school: Mullins (SC)
- College: South Carolina (2019–2023)
- NFL draft: 2024: 1st round, 32nd overall pick

Career history
- Carolina Panthers (2024–present)

Awards and highlights
- Second-team All-SEC (2023)

Career NFL statistics as of 2025
- Receptions: 84
- Receiving yards: 860
- Receiving touchdowns: 7
- Stats at Pro Football Reference

Anthony Xavier Legette (born January 29, 2001) is an American professional football wide receiver for the Carolina Panthers of the National Football League (NFL). He played college football for the South Carolina Gamecocks and was selected by the Panthers in the first round of the 2024 NFL draft.

== Early life ==
When he was in the third grade, Legette's childhood home burned down. That same year, his mother was diagnosed with cancer as well as his dad having a light heart attack. He attended Mullins High School in Mullins, South Carolina. He played wide receiver in high school but also played quarterback his senior year. As a senior, he had 1,826 yards receiving with 19 touchdowns and passed for 887 yards with 14 touchdowns. He committed to the University of South Carolina to play college football.

== College career ==
In his first four years at South Carolina, Legette played in 41 games with 17 starts and had 42 receptions for 423 yards and five touchdowns during that time. As a fifth year senior in 2023, Legette became the team's number one receiver. He totaled 1,255 yards and seven touchdowns on 71 receptions, including a career high 217 yards against Jacksonville State.

== Professional career ==
Pre-draft measurables
Height	Weight	Arm length	Hand span	Wingspan	40-yard dash	10-yard split	20-yard split	Vertical jump	Broad jump	Bench press
6 ft 1 in (1.85 m)	221 lb (100 kg)	31 7/8 in (0.81 m)	9 in (0.23 m)	6 ft 5 1/2 in (1.97 m)	4.39 s	1.54 s	2.61 s	40.0 in (1.02 m)	10 ft 6 in (3.20 m)	24 reps
All values from NFL Combine/Pro Day

The Carolina Panthers selected Legette in the first round (32nd overall) of the 2024 NFL draft. The Panthers traded their second round (33rd) and fifth round (141st) picks to the Buffalo Bills in order to move up one spot to draft Legette, receiving the 32nd overall pick and a sixth round pick (200th overall) in return. He was the seventh wide receiver drafted in 2024.

On May 10, 2024, the Carolina Panthers signed Legette to a fully guaranteed four-year, $12.35 million contract that includes a signing bonus of $5.80 million.

He had four receptions for 35 yards in his NFL debut in week 1 against the New Orleans Saints. As a rookie, he finished with 49 receptions for 497 yards and four touchdowns.

== NFL career statistics ==
Legend
**Bold**	Career high

=== Regular season ===
Year	Team	Games		Receiving							Rushing					Fumbles	
Year	Team	GP	GS	Tgt	Rec	Yds	Avg	Y/G	Lng	TD	Att	Yds	Y/A	Lng	TD	Fum	Lost
2024	CAR	16	13	**84**	**49**	**497**	10.1	**31.1**	35	**4**	**6**	**24**	**4.0**	**8**	0	0	0
2025	CAR	15	12	64	35	363	**10.4**	24.2	**36**	3	1	0	0.0	-	0	**1**	0
Career		31	25	148	84	860	10.2	27.7	36	7	7	24	3.4	8	0	1	0

=== Postseason ===
Year	Team	Games		Receiving							Rushing					Fumbles	
Year	Team	GP	GS	Tgt	Rec	Yds	Avg	Y/G	Lng	TD	Att	Yds	Y/A	Lng	TD	Fum	Lost
2025	CAR	1	0	4	1	8	8.0	8.0	8	0	0	0	0.0	0	0	0	0
Career		1	0	4	1	8	8.0	8.0	8	0	0	0	0.0	0	0	0	0
