= Bill Cox (American football) =

American football player (1929–2017)

No. 14, 40
- Positions: End, defensive end, defensive back

Personal information
- Born: May 9, 1929; Mount Airy, North Carolina, U.S.
- Died: May 14, 2017 (aged 88); Sarasota, Florida, U.S.
- Listed height: 6 ft 3 in (1.91 m)
- Listed weight: 189 lb (86 kg)

Career information
- High school: Mount Airy
- College: Duke (1947–1950)
- NFL draft: 1951: 8th round, 87th overall pick

Career history

Playing
- Washington Redskins (1951–1952, 1955)

Coaching
- Virginia Sailors (1966–1968) Head coach; Roanoke Buckskins (1969–1971) Head coach

Awards and highlights
- 2× First-team All-SoCon (1949, 1950); Duke Sports Hall of Fame

Career NFL statistics
- Interceptions: 5
- Punts: 33
- Punt yards: 1,299
- Receptions: 7
- Receiving yards: 90
- Stats at Pro Football Reference

John William Cox (May 9, 1929 – May 14, 2017) was an American professional football end in the National Football League (NFL) for the Washington Redskins. He played college football at Duke University and was drafted in the eighth round of the 1951 NFL draft.

Cox was inducted into the Duke Sports Hall of Fame in 1978. He died on May 14, 2017, at the age of 88.
