= Buddy Brown (offensive guard, born 1925) =

American football player (1925–2004)

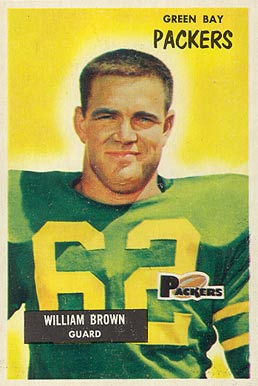
- Brown on a 1955 Bowman football card

No. 60, 62
- Position: Guard

Personal information
- Born: October 19, 1925; Wynne, Arkansas, U.S.
- Died: February 23, 2004 (aged 78); Marble Falls, Texas, U.S.
- Listed height: 6 ft 1 in (1.85 m)
- Listed weight: 220 lb (100 kg)

Career information
- High school: Wynne
- College: Arkansas (1947–1950)
- NFL draft: 1951: 19th round, 221st overall pick

Career history
- Washington Redskins (1951–1952); Green Bay Packers (1953–1956)

Career NFL statistics
- Games played: 71
- Games started: 49
- Fumble recoveries: 4
- Stats at Pro Football Reference

William Brightie Brown (October 19, 1925 – February 23, 2004) was an American professional football guard in the National Football League (NFL) for the Washington Redskins and the Green Bay Packers. He played college football at the University of Arkansas and was drafted 221st overall in the nineteenth round of the 1951 NFL draft. Brown would retire from professional football in 1956, to teach at a high school. Much of his career after that, was spent as a sales representative in the office products industry.

He died February 23, 2004.
