= 1950 All-Eastern football team =

American all-star college football team

The 1950 All-Eastern football team consists of American football players chosen by various selectors as the best players at each position among the Eastern colleges and universities during the 1950 college football season.

== All-Eastern selections ==
=== Backs ===
- Reds Bagnell, Penn (AP-1, UP-1)
- Dick Kazmaier, Princeton (AP-1, UP-1)
- Al Pollard, Army (AP-1, UP-1)
- Richard Doyne, Lehigh (AP-1)
- Robert Blaik, Army (UP-1)
- Richard Doheny, Fordham (AP-2, UP-2)
- Bernie Custis, Syracuse (AP-2, UP-2)
- Alan Egler, Colgate (AP-2)
- Robert Spears, Yale (AP-2)
- Richard Gabriel, Lehigh (UP-2)
- John Clayton, Dartmouth (UP-2)

=== Ends ===
- Dan Foldberg, Army (AP-1, UP-1)
- Alan Pfeifer, Fordham (AP-1, UP-2)
- Herb Agocs, Penn (AP-2, UP-1)
- George Sulima, Boston University (AP-2)
- Eddie Bell, Penn (UP-2)

=== Tackles ===
- Holland Donan, Princeton (AP-1, UP-1)
- Paul Tetreault, Navy (AP-1)
- J. D. Kimmel, Army (UP-1)
- Andrew Skladany, Temple (AP-2)
- Charles Shira, Army (AP-2)
- Donald Goldstrom, Penn (UP-2)
- Nick Bolkovac, Pitt (UP-2)

=== Guards ===
- Bernie Lemonick, Penn (AP-1, UP-1)
- Bradley Class, Princeton (UP-1)
- Gerald Audette, Columbia (AP-2)
- Ed Douglas, New Hampshire (AP-2)
- Bruce Elmblad, Army (UP-2)
- David Fischer, Navy (UP-2)

=== Centers ===
- John Pierik, Cornell (AP-1 [guard], UP-1)
- Elmer Stout, Army (AP-1, UP-2)
- Redmond Finney, Princeton (AP-2)

== Key ==
- AP = Associated Press
- UP = United Press

== See also ==
- 1950 College Football All-America Team
