= 1950 All-Southern Conference football team =

The 1950 All-Southern Conference football team consists of American football players chosen by the Associated Press (AP) and United Press (UP) for the All-Southern Conference football team for the 1950 college football season.

== All-Southern Conference selections ==
=== Backs ===
- Gil Bocetti, Washington & Lee (AP-1; UP-1)
- Bill Cox, Duke (AP-1; UP-1)
- Steve Wadiak, South Carolina (AP-1; UP-1)
- Fred Cone, Clemson (AP-1; UP-1)
- Jackie Calvert, Clemson (AP-2; UP-2)
- Bill Miller, Wake Forest (AP-2; UP-2)
- Andy Davis, George Washington (AP-2; UP-2)
- Ed Mooney, North Carolina State (AP-2; UP-2)

=== Ends ===
- Elmer Wingate, Maryland (AP-1; UP-1)
- Glenn Smith, Clemson (AP-2; UP-1)
- Blaine Earon, Duke (AP-1)
- Jerry DeLuca, The Citadel (AP-2; UP-2)
- Mike Souchak, Duke (UP-2)

=== Tackles ===
- Elmer Costa, North Carolina State (AP-1; UP-1)
- Jim Staton, Wake Forest (AP-1; UP-1)
- Ray Krouse, Maryland (AP-2; UP-2)
- Ed Listopad, Wake Forest (AP-2; UP-2)

=== Guards ===
- Bob Ward, Maryland (AP-1; UP-1)
- Joe Dudeck, North Carolina (AP-1; UP-2)
- Bob Auffarth, Wake Forest (UP-1)
- Dave Sparks, South Carolina (AP-2; UP-2)
- Robert Conrad, Washington & Lee (AP-2)

=== Centers ===
- Irv Holdash, North Carolina (AP-1; UP-1)
- Joe McCutcheon, Washington & Lee (AP-2; UP-2)

== Key ==
AP = Associated Press UP = United Press

== See also ==
- 1950 College Football All-America Team
