= S. J. Whitman =

American football player (born 1926)

S.J. Whitman
No. 21, 22
- Position: Defensive back

Personal information
- Born: August 17, 1926; Hollis, Oklahoma, U.S.
- Died: December 11, 2000 (aged 74); Tulsa, Oklahoma, U.S.
- Listed height: 5 ft 11 in (1.80 m)
- Listed weight: 185 lb (84 kg)

Career information
- College: Tulsa
- NFL draft: 1951: 22nd round, 259th overall pick

Career history
- Chicago Cardinals (1951–1953); Chicago Bears (1953-1954)

Career NFL statistics
- Interceptions: 18
- Fumble recoveries: 2
- Total touchdowns: 1
- Stats at Pro Football Reference

S. J. Laverne Whitman (August 17, 1926 – December 11, 2000) was an American professional football player who played four seasons in the National Football League (NFL) for the Chicago Cardinals and the Chicago Bears. He played college football, basketball, baseball, and track as a four sport Letterman for the Tulsa Golden Hurricane.

After retirement he owned several service/gas stations in Tulsa OK. He owned his DX service station for over 40 years in Tulsa. Retiring at 65 years old.
