= Howie Hansen =

American gridiron football player (1925–1952)

Profile
- Position: End

Personal information
- Born: September 5, 1925; Pocatello, Idaho, U.S.
- Died: April 11, 1952 (aged 26); Utah, U.S.
- Listed height: 6 ft 3 in (1.91 m)
- Listed weight: 220 lb (100 kg)

Career information
- College: UCLA
- NFL draft: 1951: 28th round, 334th overall pick

Career history
- 1949–1951: Edmonton Eskimos

Edgar Howard "Howie" Hansen (September 5, 1925 – April 11, 1952) was an American professional football player who played for the Edmonton Eskimos of the Canadian Football League (CFL). He previously played football at the University of California, Los Angeles. He was married to LaVon Hinkson, who died in 1950. He died in 1952.
