= Chet Lagod =

American football player (1928–2013)

No. 65
- Position: Guard

Personal information
- Born: January 8, 1928; Fairpoint, Ohio, U.S.
- Died: October 25, 2013 (aged 85); Chattanooga, Tennessee, U.S.
- Listed height: 6 ft 2 in (1.88 m)
- Listed weight: 220 lb (100 kg)

Career information
- High school: St. Clairsville (St. Clairsville, Ohio)
- College: Chattanooga
- NFL draft: 1951: 25th round, 302nd overall pick

Career history
- New York Giants (1953)

Career NFL statistics
- Games played: 11
- Stats at Pro Football Reference

Chester Joseph Lagod (January 8, 1928 – October 25, 2013) was an American professional football guard. He was drafted by the New York Giants in the 25th round (302nd overall) of the 1951 NFL Draft. He played for the New York Giants in 1953.

He died on October 25, 2013, in Chattanooga, Tennessee at age 85.
