= Mullins High School =

Coordinates: 34.2070°N 79.2814°W

Location
- 747 Miller's Road; Mullins, South Carolina 29574

Information
- Established: 1923
- Principal: Kelvin Edwards
- Grades: 9-12
- Enrollment: 568
- Student to teacher ratio: 18.93
- Mascot: Auctioneer

Mullins High School is in Mullins, South Carolina. About 3/4 of the student body is black, 14 percent white, and seven percent Hispanic. One hundred percent of students are categorized as economically disadvantaged and the school is categorized a fringe rural.>

== History ==
Established in 1923, it was white only. In 1928 it was one of 310 high schools in South Carolina that received money from the state. Twelve of the high schools were "Negro". The area's black students attended a Rosenwald School until the 1950s when Palmetto High School was built.

L. B. McCormick was the first principal at Mullins High School. The school was expanded in the 1930s.

In 1960, a group of students sang for the South Carolina House of Representatives.

In 1971 it the school was integrated and Palmetto High School became a middle school. The original school burned down in 1976. A new school building was completed in 1981. The campus is 84 acres.

During the 1986–1987 school year, hundreds of students were screened for Tuberculosis following an outbreak. At least 76 students tested positive for the infection. At least one student died during the outbreak.

Terry Hoeppner coached at the school. Mark Gerald coached Mullins High School's boys varsity basketball team for 30 years before he died in 2014.

== Alumni ==
- Xavier Legette
- Jarod Gerald
- John L. McMillan

== See also ==
- Pike County Central High School
- List of high schools in South Carolina
