= Reds Bagnell =

American football player (1928–1995)

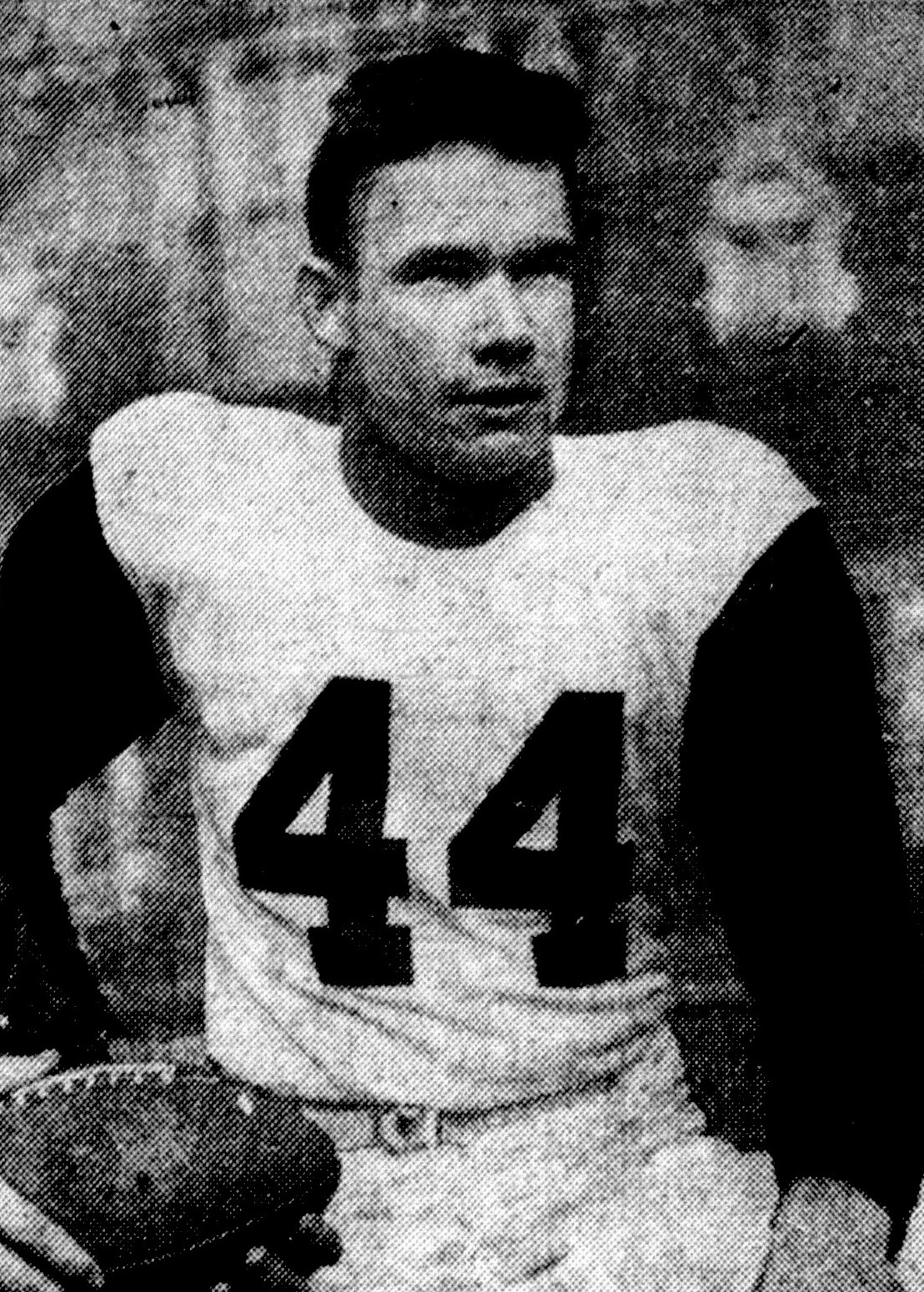
- Bagnell, circa 1951

No. 44
- Position: Halfback

Personal information
- Born: September 15, 1928; Philadelphia, Pennsylvania, U.S.
- Died: July 10, 1995 (aged 66); Philadelphia, Pennsylvania, U.S.
- Listed height: 6 ft 0 in (1.83 m)
- Listed weight: 178 lb (81 kg)

Career information
- College: Penn (1948–1950)

Awards and highlights
- Maxwell Award (1950); Second-team All-American (1950); First-team All-Eastern (1950); Pennsylvania Sports Hall of Fame
- College Football Hall of Fame

Francis J. "Reds" Bagnell (September 15, 1928 – July 10, 1995) was an American football halfback. He played college football for the Penn Quakers, where he won the Maxwell Award in 1950. He was inducted into the College Football Hall of Fame in 1977.

Bagnell passed up his chance to play in the NFL to enlist in the navy, where he served a 4-year stint as a naval officer.

He had a successful business career as resident manager of Fahnestock & Co. (investment bankers) in Bala Cynwyd, Pennsylvania, and as a senior vice president of New York Stock Exchange from 1967 to 1970, followed by a long career as president of a highly successful energy company. He was appointed to the American Battle Monuments Commission by Ronald Reagan and George Herbert Walker Bush.
