= John Bove =

Canadian football player

Profile
- Positions: Guard, Tackle

Personal information
- Born: April 14, 1924; Auburn, New York, U.S.
- Died: August 29, 1997 (aged 73)
- Listed height: 6 ft 1 in (1.85 m)
- Listed weight: 240 lb (109 kg)

Career history
- 1951–1959: Ottawa Rough Riders

Awards and highlights
- Grey Cup champion (1951)

John L. Bove (August 14, 1924 – August 29, 1997) was an American professional football player who played for the Ottawa Rough Riders. He won the Grey Cup with them in 1951. Bove previously attended West Virginia University and played football for the West Virginia Mountaineers.
