= History of Erie, Pennsylvania =

Erie, Pennsylvania, has had a long history as a major city in the Great Lakes region of the United States.

== Iroquois and Seneca Nations ==
The Six Nations of the Iroquois Confederacy and the Seneca Nation occupied the lands now known as Erie. For a history of the Native Americans who occupied this land before Europeans, see Erie Indians.

== Early French settlement ==
The French built Fort Presque Isle near present-day Erie in 1753, as part of their effort to garrison New France against the encroaching English. The French word "Presque-isle" means peninsula (literally "almost an island") and refers to that piece of land that juts into Lake Erie that is now called Presque Isle State Park. When the fort was abandoned by the French in 1760, it was their last post west of Niagara. The British occupied the fort at Presque Isle that same year, three years before the end of the Seven Years' War in 1763.

== Erie Triangle ==
Present day Erie would have been situated in a disputed triangle of land that was claimed by the states of New York, Pennsylvania, Connecticut (as part of its Western Reserve), and Massachusetts. It officially became part of Pennsylvania on March 3, 1792, after Connecticut, Massachusetts, and New York released their claims to the federal government, which in turn sold the land to Pennsylvania for $151,600 in Continental certificates. The Six Nations of the Iroquois Confederacy released the land to Pennsylvania in January 1789 for payments of $2,000 from Pennsylvania and $1,200 from the federal government. The Seneca Nation separately settled land claims against Pennsylvania in February 1791 for the sum of $800.

== Surveying and settlement ==
The General Assembly of Pennsylvania commissioned the surveying of land near Presque Isle through an act passed on April 18, 1795. Andrew Ellicott, who famously completed Pierre Charles L'Enfant's survey of Washington, D.C., and helped resolve the boundary between Pennsylvania and New York, arrived to begin the survey in June 1795. Initial settlement of the area began that year.

In 1795, Colonel Seth Reed and his family, natives of Uxbridge, Massachusetts, moved here from Geneva, New York, to become the first European settlers of Erie. Reed erected a log cabin at the mouth of Mill Creek, becoming the first permanent building in Erie. Reed's other sons, Rufus S. Reed and George W. Reed, came to Erie later in the year.

Erie was established as a borough by act of the General Assembly on March 29, 1805. This act created a Borough and Town Council headed by a burgess. This form of government stood until the City of Erie was incorporated on April 14, 1851, when a mayoralty and Select Council were established.

== War of 1812 ==
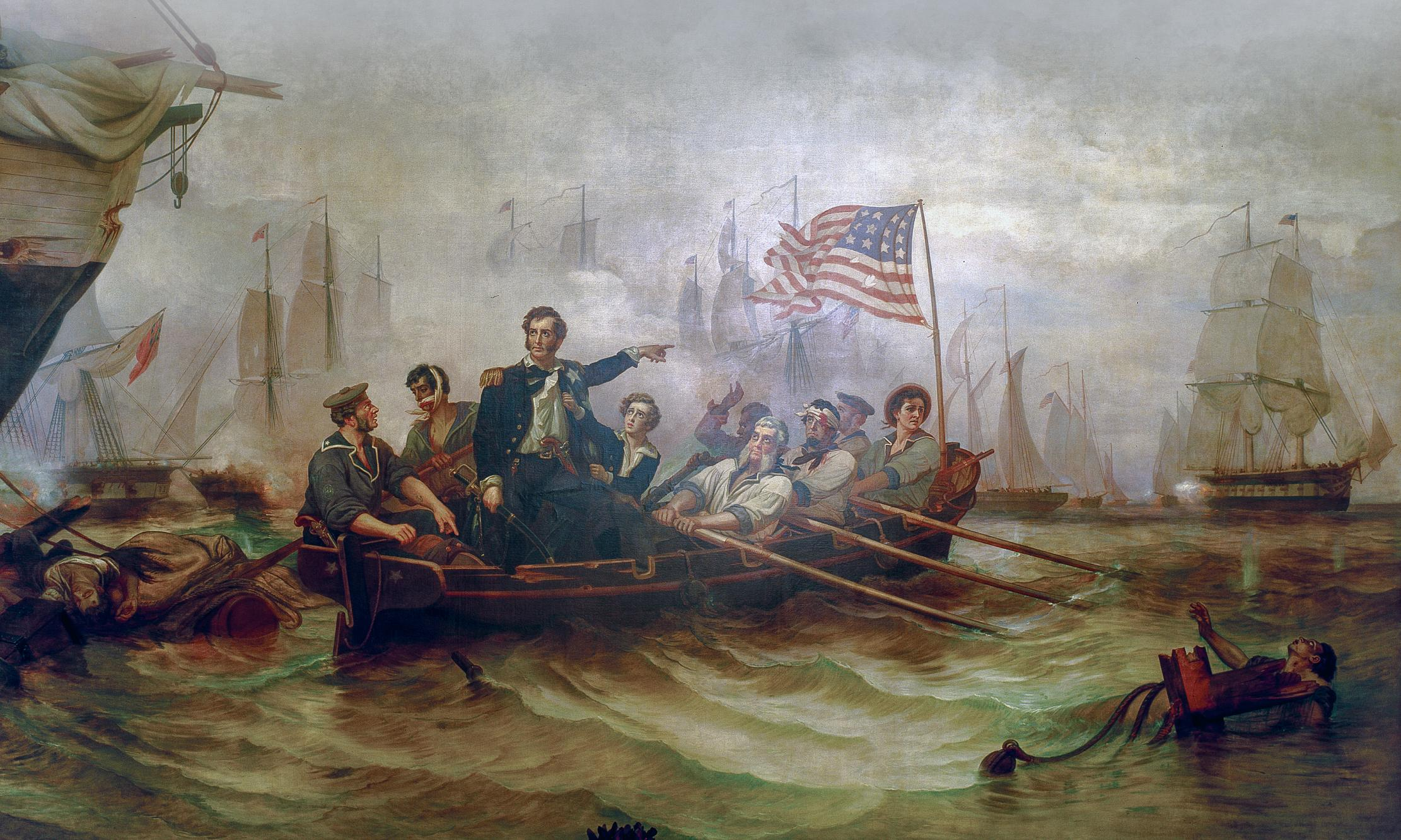
Painting of the Battle of Lake Erie

During the War of 1812, President James Madison ordered the construction of a naval fleet at Erie in order to regain control of Lake Erie. Noted shipbuilders Daniel Dobbins of Erie and Noah Brown of New York led construction of four schooner-rigged gunboats and two brigs. Commodore Oliver Hazard Perry arrived from Rhode Island to command the squadron. His fleet successfully fought the British in the Battle of Lake Erie, which solidified United States control of Lake Erie.

== Erie Gauge War ==
Erie was an important railroad hub in the mid-19th century. However, the railroad north to Buffalo, New York used 6-foot (1.8 m) track up to the New York border, while the railroad west to Cleveland, Ohio and that from the New York border to Buffalo from was on the narrower 4-foot-10-inch (1.47 m) gauge. What this meant was that there was no line through Erie; every passenger had to change trains, and every piece of cargo had to be moved by railroad stevedores and wagons between trains. While the trains were timed to connect, delays could cause passengers to miss their connection; they then needed a meal and a bed in Erie.

The delays inconvenienced both passengers and cargo, adding to the time and therefore the expense of travel by rail between Buffalo to Cleveland. However, they provided much needed jobs in Erie. Travelers were patrons of Erie hotels, restaurants, and stores. Those shipping goods needed manpower, and some of this came from Erie itself; there were many self-employed "men with a horse" and a wagon moving goods. The two railroads themselves provided jobs.

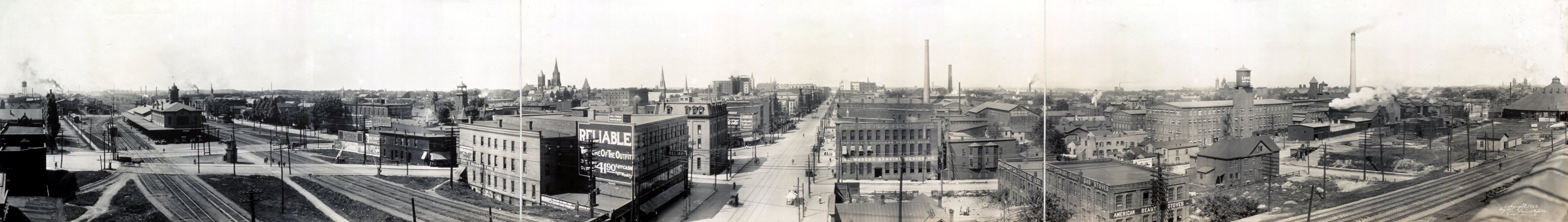
1912 panorama of downtown Erie

It was obvious to everyone except those from Erie that this was a ridiculous situation. The 6 feet (1.8 m) section needed to be changed to 4 feet 10 inches (1.47 m), the national standard, so trains could go through Erie, and passengers and goods would not have to change trains twice between Buffalo and Cleveland. However, this would have a substantial negative effect on employment and the economy in Erie, which benefited from the unavoidable train change. The citizens of Erie, led by the mayor, set fire to bridges, ripped up track, and in general did everything imaginable to prevent the change.

== Prohibition era ==
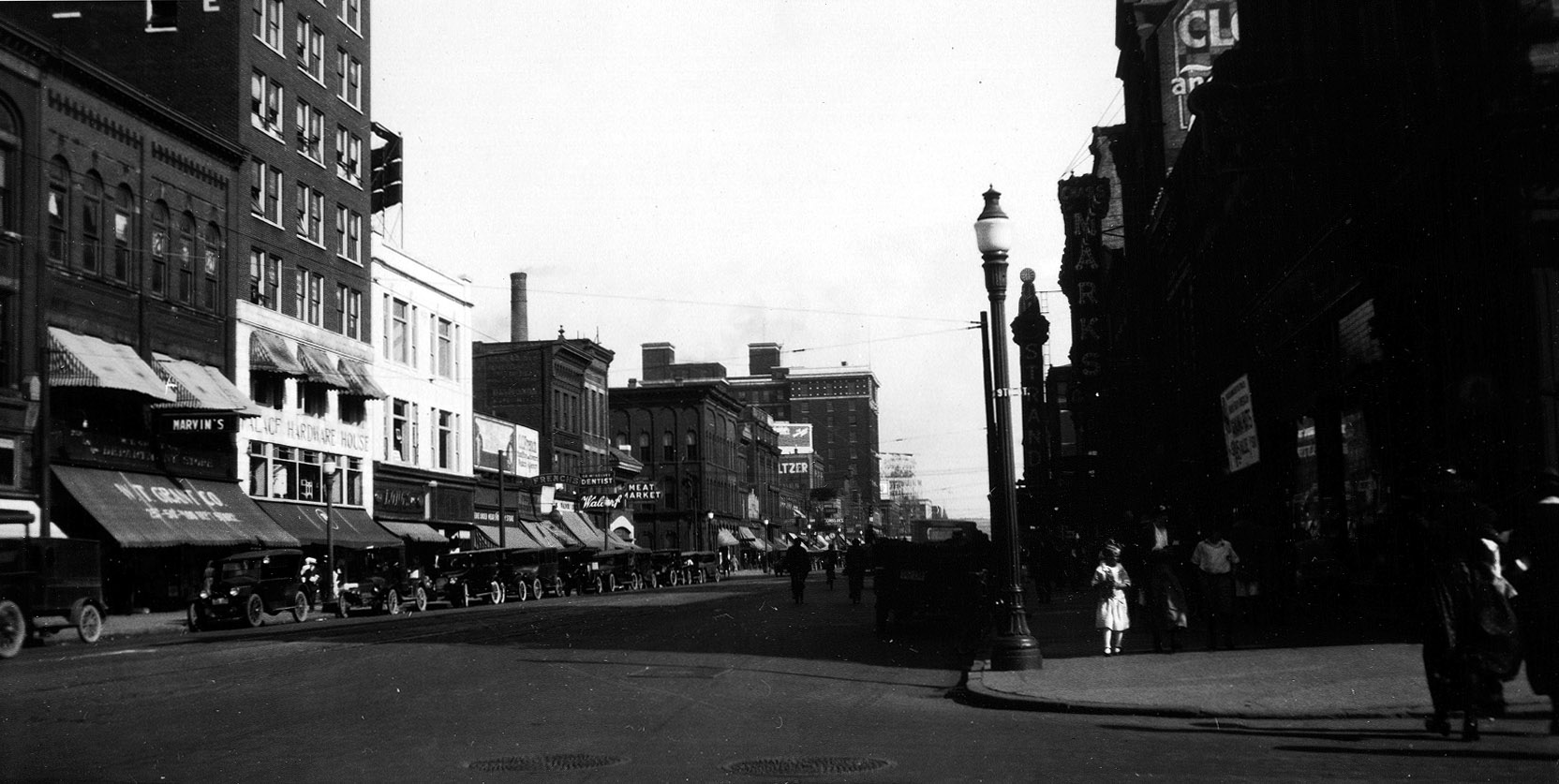
State and 9th Street in downtown Erie during the early 1920s.

Erie's congressional representative Milton W. Shreve supported the Volstead Act and the Eighteenth Amendment. Miles Nason, another Erie Prohibitionist, headed the Dry Block in the Pennsylvania State Senate. But Erie was primarily a "wet" city. Being a border town, Erie was an important transportation hub in the rum-running of illicit liquor across the lake from Canada during Prohibition in the United States. John G. Carney, in his "Highlights of Erie Politics", says that many "laid in a large supply of liquor before the law became effective. Cellars, book cases, and closets were packed...." Speakeasies opened across the city, the more popular being the Pickwick Club, the Killarney Yacht Club, Laura's, and 1008. Carney noted that "... about the only dry thing in Erie was the inside of a light bulb."

Illicit liquor sales brought racketeering, violence, and houses of prostitution. Intervention by the state police was not welcomed by Mayor Miles B. Kitts, who went to Harrisburg and testified before well-publicized hearings conducted by Pennsylvania Governor William C. Sproul. But the actions of local and state law enforcement and the governor's hearings offered only a brief respite from all the excitement. As Carney concluded, "...and Erie 'roared' merrily on throughout the rest of the 'Roaring Twenties.' "

Shreve fell from favor with the Republicans, who promoted attorney Robert Firman as their candidate in the April 1920 primaries. Shreve narrowly escaped removal from the United States Congress. State Senator Nason was also challenged by the Republicans in the primaries, but was defeated in the November 2, 1920, elections.

== Depression era ==
The Great Depression deflated Erie's enthusiasm for lawlessness and prompted a solid political movement towards repeal of Prohibition. Democratic Party chairman for Erie County and future mayor James P. Rossiter was able to promise strong local voter support for Democratic-Liberal candidate for state governor John Hemphill when he visited Erie with a strong agenda for repeal in October 1930.

== Recent developments ==
In 2007, the Erie Downtown Improvement District (DID) contracted a Philadelphia-based company (Kise, Straw, & Kolodner) to set up a "master plan" for the city of Erie's downtown. The DID plan includes building several mid-rise and high-rise structures which will be used primarily for housing and retail expansion in the city center. Fourth River Development and Radnor Property Group were selected as the developers.

In January 2007, GAF, an asphalt shingle manufacturer announced plans to relocate to Eastern Pennsylvania, thus making available several extremely valuable acres next to the Convention Center and hotel under construction. A local newspaper poll showed that the majority of local citizens desire a park-like setting, followed by retail development in the area.

== See also ==
- List of mayors of Erie, Pennsylvania

== Notes ==
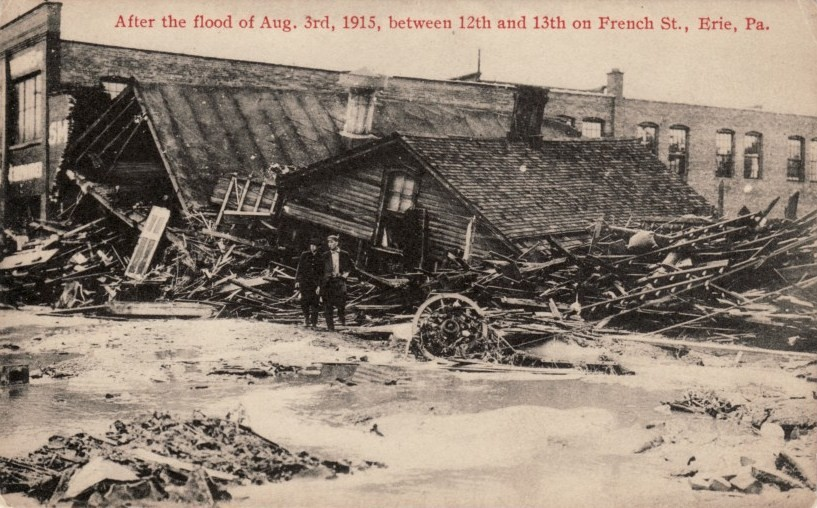
French Street between 12th and 13th Streets after the August 3, 1915, flood
