= Reinhard Liebel =

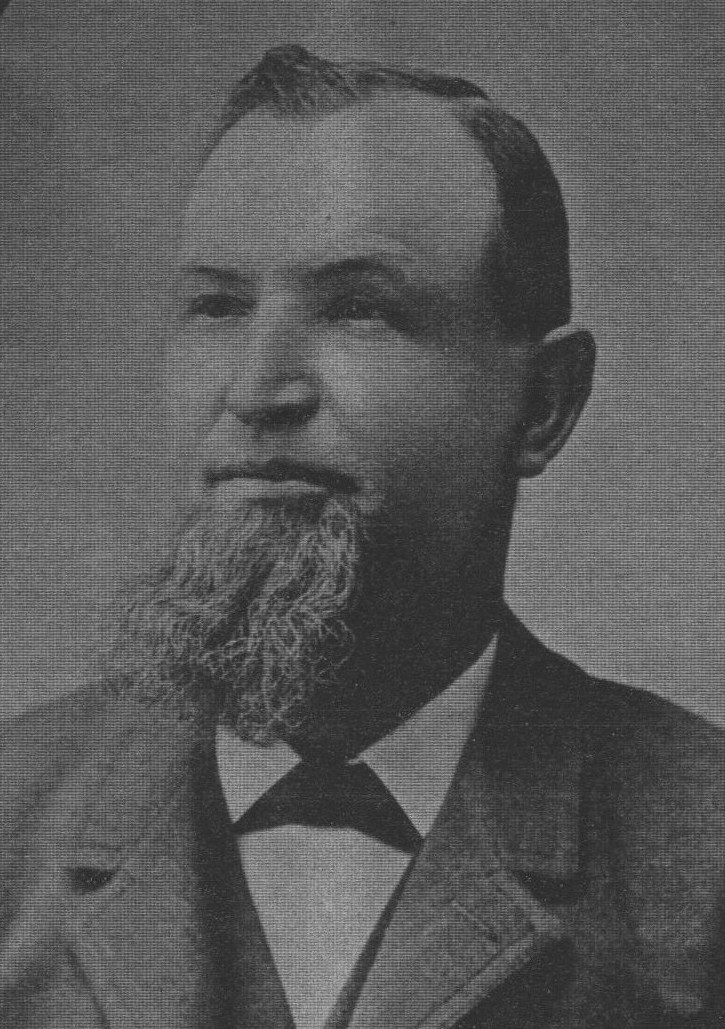
- Born: Reinhard Liebel; January 31, 1841; Leimersheim, Germany
- Died: October 11, 1905 (aged 64); Erie, Pennsylvania, US
- Resting place: Trinity Cemetery
- Occupations: President of the South Erie Iron Works; Erie Fire Commissioner; Erie Common Council
- Spouse: Mary Uhr Liebel (1844-1903)
- Children: 12
- Relatives: Michael Liebel (brother); Michael Liebel, Jr. (nephew)

Reinhard Liebel (January 31, 1841 – March 11, 1905) was a businessman and politician from Erie, Pennsylvania. Reinhard was a member of the Liebel family, which was one of the oldest and most prominent families in Erie.

== Early life ==
Reinhard was born January 31, 1841, in Leimersheim, Germany to Johannes Liebel and Eva Hammer Liebel. Liebel was one of six children, all of whom were born in Leimersheim, Germany. Along with their parents, they immigrated to the United States in 1857 aboard the SV Argo from Le Havre (the second largest port in France) to New York City. The children were: Jacob Liebel (1834-1880), George Philip Liebel (1836-1893), Francis Peter Liebel (1838-1895), a Justice of the Peace and Alderman in Erie who received his commission April 25, 1871. In 1887, Francis, at one time one of the wealthiest citizens of Erie, was arrested after his store was seized by police. According to news reports at the time, Liebel and a posse attacked the store that police had taken possession of with an axe and drove the deputies from the premises, Reinhard Liebel (1841-1905), Michael Liebel (1843-1906), and Maria Frances Liebel (1845-1850).

Through his brother, Michael, and his sister-in-law, Clara Maria Uhr (who was also a sister to Reinhard's wife), he was uncle to Michael Liebel, Jr. (1870-1927), the Mayor of Erie, Pennsylvania, from 1906-1911, and a Democratic member of the United States House of Representatives from Pennsylvania, from 1915-1917.

== Career ==
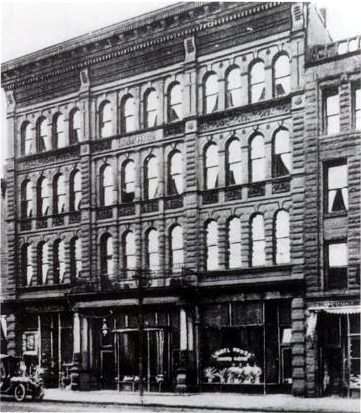
Liebel House hotel in Erie, Pa.

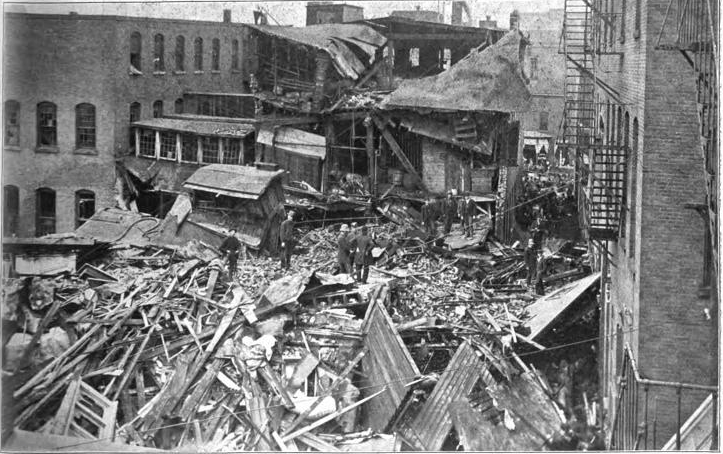
Boiler Explosion of Hays Manufacturing Co. & Liebel Hotel in 1901 in Erie, Pa.

=== South Erie Iron Works ===
Liebel was the President of the South Erie Iron Works during the boom years of Iron in Erie. South Erie Iron Works was established by Adam Acheson and William Henry on Peach Street in 1858 and was incorporated in 1868. It produced stoves and general iron works and was headquartered at 1917 Peach Street (built from 1871-1891) in Erie with the foundry at 26th and Maple Streets (built from 1885-1887). In 1896, Liebel was President, John G. Liebel (Reinhard's son) was Corporate Secretary, and A. K. Acheson was Treasurer. The principal stockholders were Reinhard, John G. Liebel, Adam K. Acheson, D. S. Clark, Tobias S. Alberstadt, John Henry Kalvelage (former owner of the Eagle Brewery), D. T. Jones, Mrs. William Henry, Ph. Deifenbach, and James Leask.

In 1898, Liebel's son, John G. Liebel along with John Depinet, purchased the Chicago and Erie Stove Works in Erie, founded by William Himrod. The purchase included all patents, designs, and patterns. Up to that point, John had been connected with Reinhard's South Erie Iron Works. Liebel and Depinet continued to operate the company under the old name, but utilized the business and methods from South Erie Iron Works.

=== Liebel House hotel ===
The Liebel's also ran the Liebel House, a hotel, which opened January 1, 1887, at 1101-1114 State Street in Erie, on the site of the old Keefer House (also known as the United States Hotel). The hotel was the largest in Erie next to the Reed House, and it was originally called the Arlington. It was renamed to the Liebel House to honor the builders after several years.

The hotel was in operation until October 1901 when a large boiler in the brass foundry of the Hayes Manufacturing Company on West 11th Street exploded and completely demolished the Hayes building and an adjoining building that directly backed up, and connected with, the Liebel House by a covered passageway across the alley. At the time of the explosion, dinner was being served, and six women who were in the kitchen of the Liebel House perished in the wreck. The drift of the explosion passed through the hotel bar with that part of the hotel completely wrecked. The hotel itself was seriously damaged with all the plate glass windows wrecked and was eventually demolished. Damage to the Hayes Manufacturing Company building and the hotel amounted to about $50,000 (equivalent to $1,935,000 in 2025).

=== Elected office ===
Reinhard was a staunch Democrat and served the City of Erie in several official positions:

- Member of the Board of Fire Commissioners from 1887-1892
- Common Council under Mayor David T. Jones in 1880
- Common Council under Mayor Joseph McCarter in 1881
- Select Council under Mayor Joseph McCarter in 1882
- Common Council under Mayor Philip Becker in 1883

Liebel's brother, Michael Liebel (1843-1906), also served on the Common Council from 1871-1875, of which he was President from 1873-1874 (under Mayor Charles M. Reed and Mayor Henry Rawle). In 1876, he served as President of the Select Council under Mayor John W. Hammond. From 1877-1881, Michael was on the Board of Commissioners of Erie Water Works. From 1904-1906, Michael was on the Board of Railroad Crossing Commissioners.

== Personal life and death ==
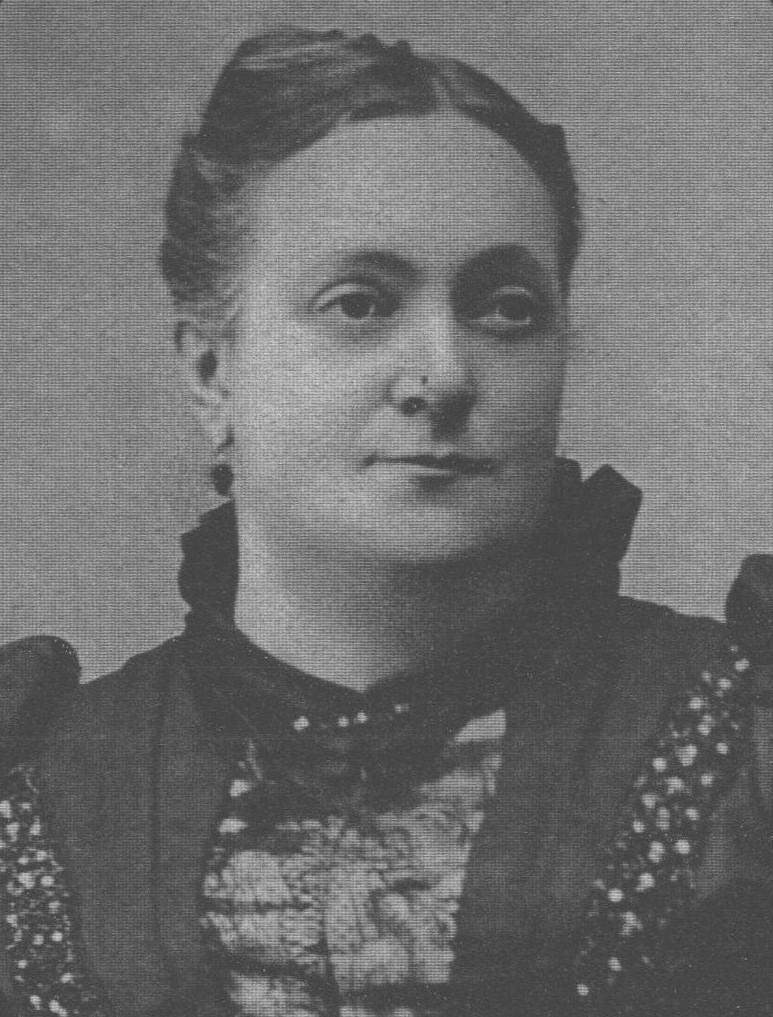
Mary Uhr Liebel

Liebel married Mary Uhr (1844-1903), who was born in Canada to Johann Uhr and Margaretha Paul Uhr. Together, they had seven sons and five daughters:

- John G. Liebel (1862-1916)
- Helen Liebel (1864-1919)
- Edmund Liebel (1866- )
- Catherine Liebel (1867-1901)
- Clara Liebel (1869-1923)
- Adam Frederick Liebel (1872-1930)
- George Reinhard Liebel (1874-1953)
- Herman Liebel (1879-1956)
- William V. Liebel (1879-1914)
- Elanora M. Liebel (1881-1969)
- Amelia M. Liebel (1884-1979)
- Albert L. Liebel (1887-1950)

Liebel died March 11, 1905, one of Erie's best known citizens, at the family residence, 2316 Peach Street Erie, Pennsylvania. Liebel had been sick for over a year. His wife, Mary Liebel died a little more than year before him in 1903. Liebel's funeral took place at St. Joseph's Church.

=== Clubs and organizations ===
Liebel was described as "an enterprising and progressive citizen and did much for the southern and southwestern end of the city." Additionally, it was said that "he was a man who made friends quickly and always retained them." He was a charter member of Catholic Mutual Benevolent Association ("C.M.B.A.") Branch No. 9 and also a member of the P. H. C. and the Erie Maennerchor, a German singing society and social club founded in 1871. In the final years of his life, Liebel engaged in the real estate and insurance business.
