= 2017 Erie mayoral election =

- November 7, 2017
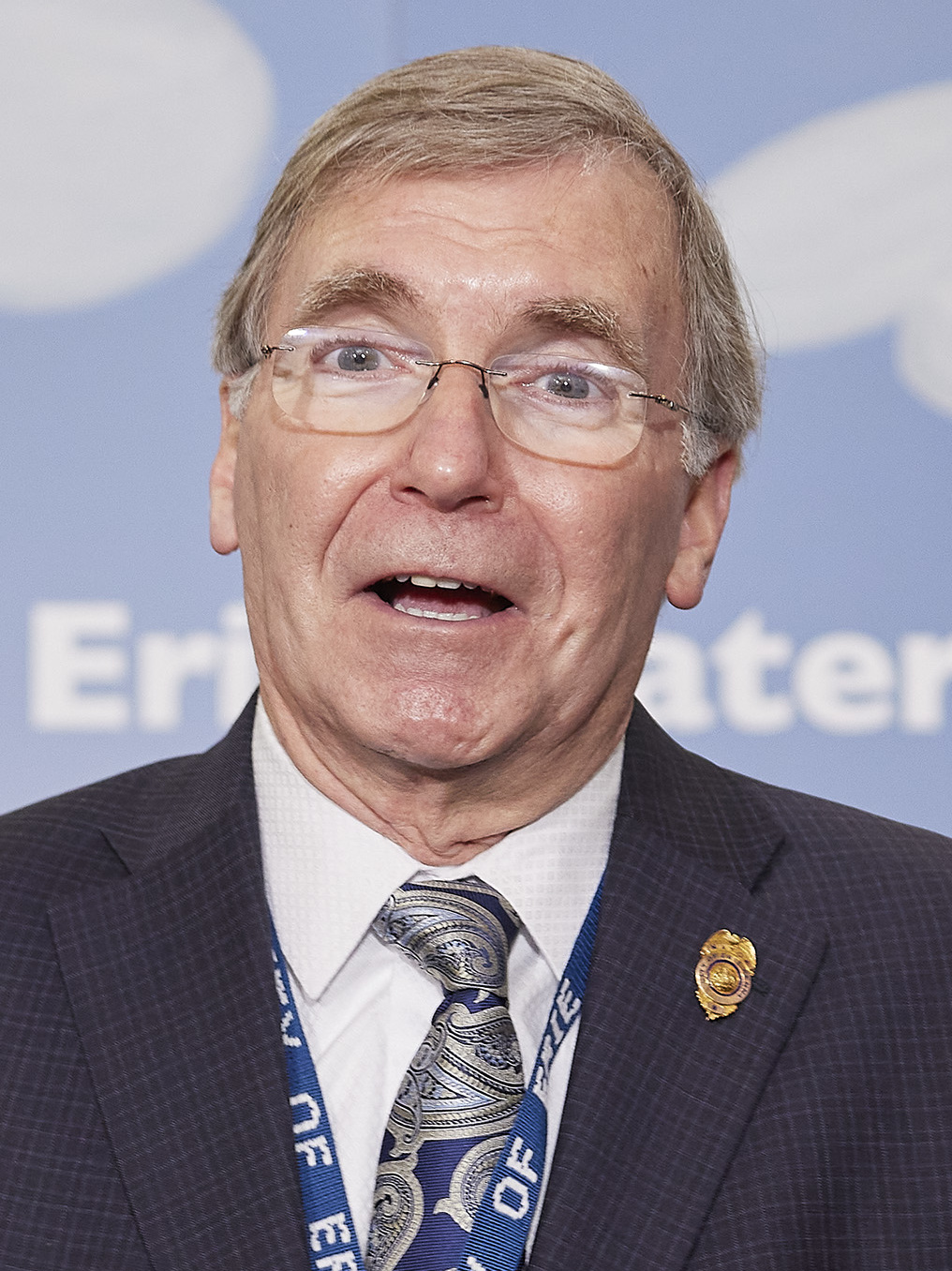
| Nominee | Joe Schember | John Persinger |
| Party | Democratic | Republican |
| Popular vote | 10,389 | 9,074 |
| Percentage | 53.37% | 46.62% |
Mayor before election
Joseph E. Sinnott
Democratic
Elected mayor
Joe Schember
Democratic

The 2017 Erie mayoral election was held on November 7, 2017, to elect the mayor of Erie, Pennsylvania. Incumbent mayor Joseph E. Sinnott was ineligible for a fourth term due to term limits. Former Erie City Council member Joe Schember won his first term to the office after winning the general election. The primary elections for Democrat and Republican candidates were held on May 16, 2017, where Joe Schember won the Democratic nomination, defeating 6 other opponents, while John Persinger won the Republican nomination, defeating one other opponent.

== Background ==
Erie mayoral elections have been won by Democrats since the mid 60's, with the last Republican being elected mayor in 1961. Mayor Joseph E. Sinnott, served for three consecutive terms from 2006 to 2018. Joe Schember who formerly worked for PNC Bank and was also former Erie council member, serving from 2006 to 2012, but resigned from it citing deep concerns with one of the council's segments. John Persinger was a lawyer serving in Erie.

== Democratic Primary ==
=== Candidates ===
==== Nominee ====
- Joe Schember, former Erie City Council member and former relationship manager at PNC Bank.

==== Defeated in Primary ====
- Bob Merski, Erie City Council member.
- Jay Breneman, Erie County Council Chair.
- Rubye Jenkins-Husband, former Erie City Council member.
- Steve Franklin, retired Chief of the Erie Bureau of Police.
- Almi Clerkin, executive director of the Erie Playhouse.
- Lisa Austin, Edinboro University professor.

=== Endorsements ===
Joe Schember

People

- Curtis Jones Jr, Erie City Council member.
- Dave Brennan, Erie City Council member.
- Mel Witherspoon, Erie City Council member.

News Organizations

- Erie-Times-News editorial board
Jay Breneman

News Organizations

- Erie Reader editorial board

=== Results ===
2017 Erie mayoral election Democratic primary results
| Party | Candidate | Votes | % |
|---|---|---|---|
| Democratic | Joe Schember | 3,764 | 30.46% |
| Democratic | Bob Merski | 3,086 | 24.94% |
| Democratic | Jay Breneman | 2,422 | 19.58% |
| Democratic | Rubye Jenkins-Husband | 1,691 | 13.67% |
| Democratic | Lisa Austin | 557 | 4.50% |
| Democratic | Almi Clerkin | 518 | 4.18% |
| Democratic | Steve Franklin | 314 | 2.53% |
| Write-in | | 15 | 0.12% |
| Total votes | | 12,369 | 100.00% |

== Republican Primary ==
=== Candidates ===
==== Nominee ====
- John Persinger, lawyer.

==== Defeated in Primary ====
- Jon Whaley, businessman and former aide to Mayor Sinnot.

==== Withdrew ====
- Al Zimmer, retired security guard.

=== Endorsements ===
John Persinger
News Organizations
- Erie-Times-News editorial board

=== Results ===
2017 Erie mayoral election Republican primary results
| Party | Candidate | Votes | % |
|---|---|---|---|
| Republican | John Persinger | 1,943 | 65.95% |
| Republican | Jon Whaley | 779 | 26.44% |
| Write-in | | 224 | 7.60% |
| Total votes | | 2,946 | 100.00% |

== General Election ==
=== Results ===
2017 Erie mayoral election results
| Party | Candidate | Votes | % |
|---|---|---|---|
| Democratic | Joe Schember | 10,389 | 53.37% |
| Republican | John Persinger | 9,074 | 46.62% |
| Total votes | | 19,463 | 100.00% |
