= Dickson Tavern =

- U.S. National Register of Historic Places
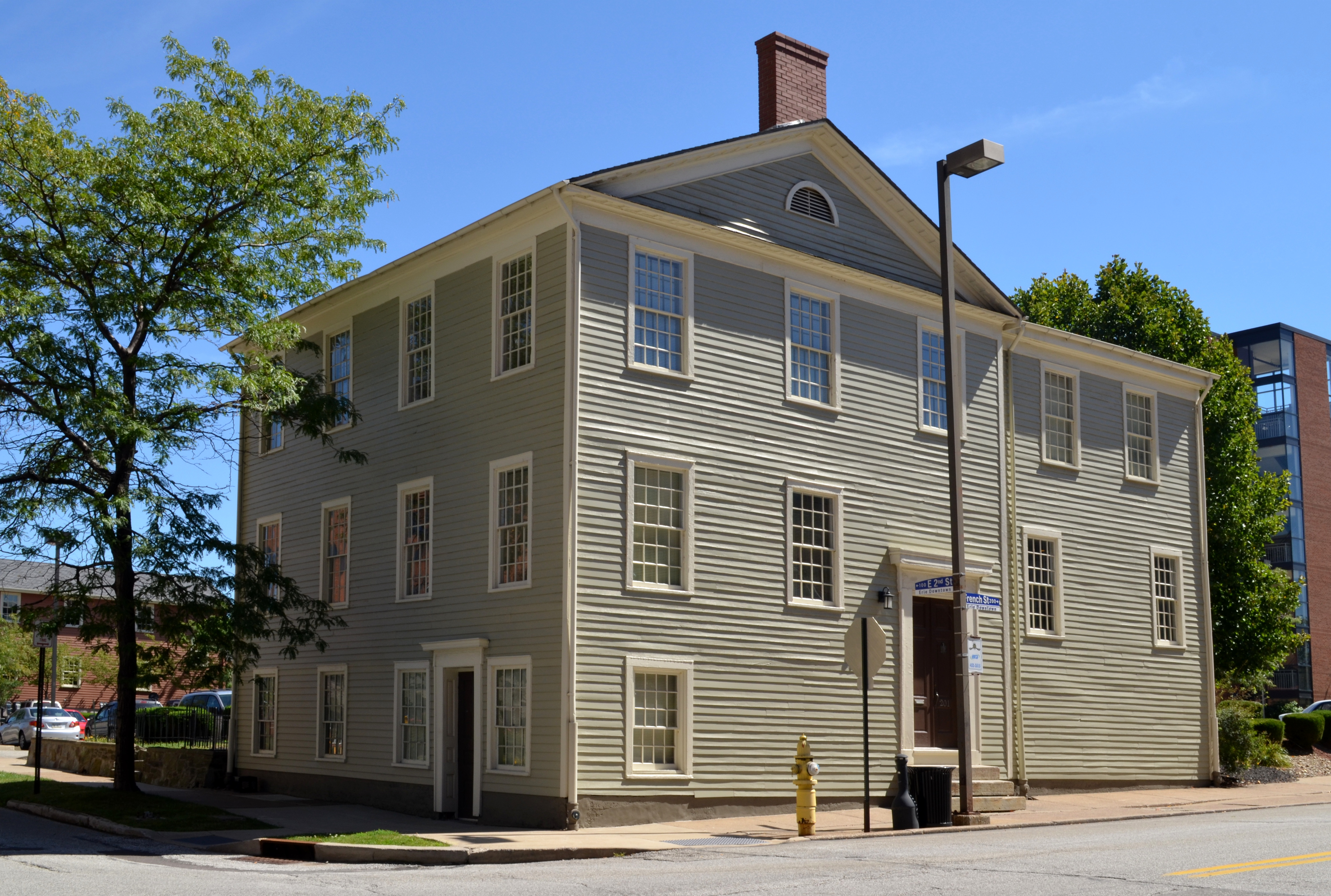

- Location within Pennsylvania
- Location: 201 French Street, Erie, Pennsylvania
- Coordinates: 42°8′2″N 80°5′11″W
- Built: 1815
- Built by: William Himrod
- Architectural style: Federal, Greek Revival
- NRHP reference No.: 89002256
- Added to NRHP: January 18, 1990

The Dickson Tavern, or the Perry Memorial House, is the oldest building in the city of Erie in the U.S. state of Pennsylvania. Located at the corner of 2nd and French Streets in downtown Erie, the structure was listed on the National Register of Historic Places in 1990. The three-story Federal and Greek Revival-style building was constructed in 1815 by William Himrod and owned by John Dickson. It was acquired by the city of Erie in 1924. The Dickson Tavern was documented by the Historic American Buildings Survey (HABS) in 1936.

== Description ==
The Dickson Tavern is a three-story building on the corner of 2nd and French Streets, across the street from the UPMC Hamot medical center. The northern, original section the building is characterized by a Federal architectural style with its evenly spaced windows. The southern, Greek Revival portion of tavern was constructed as part of an addition and lacks the symmetry of the original building.

== History ==
John Dickson, a Baltimore native, arrived in Erie in 1808. During the War of 1812, Dickson became a prisoner-of-war. After the war, Dickson opened a hotel on French Street between 3rd and 4th Streets. He bought a plot of land on the corner of 2nd and French Streets where, a year later, William Himrod built a tavern. The tavern itself was named by Dickson the "Exchange Coffee House" to appeal to the higher class. Dickson was known for hosting outdoor banquets during the summer months. One such banquet, on June 9, 1825, was attended by the Marquis de Lafayette, who visited Erie on his return to the United States. Dickson moved to Meadville, Pennsylvania, in 1829 and opened another establishment. He moved, again, to Pittsburgh two years later and sold the tavern in Erie for $1,800.

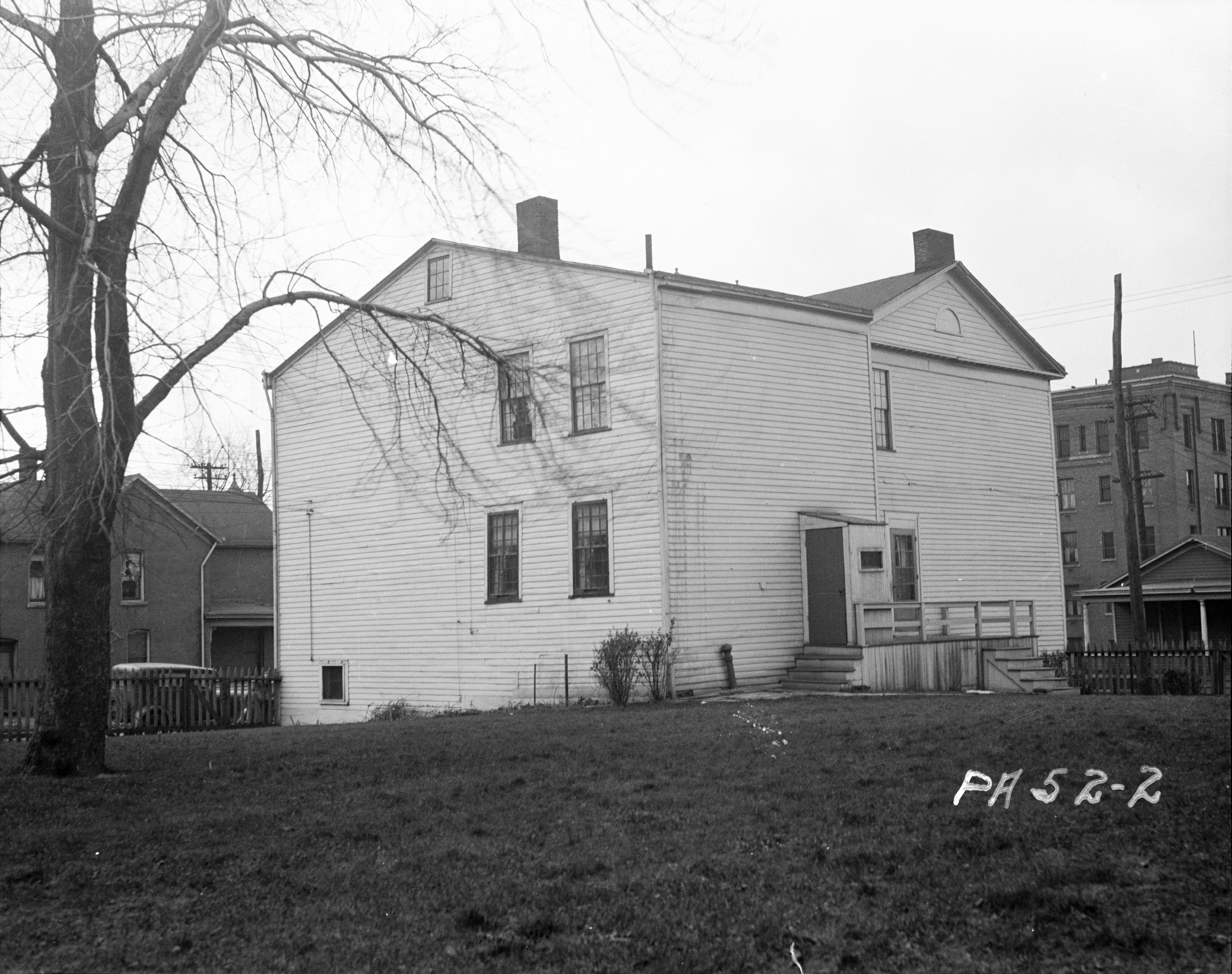
A HABS photo from 1936 showing the rear of the tavern.

The tavern continued to be used as an eating establishment by various owners, until it was sold 1841. In 1841, an addition was made to the building and it was used as a residence until 1924. It was then acquired by the city and faced demolition. It was often alleged that the tunnels under the Dickson Tavern were part of the Underground Railroad, but the claims have since been disputed. The building's interior was modified from 1928 to 1963 for use as a museum and became known as the Perry Memorial House. The museum was closed in 2004 and Dickson has since remained vacant. In November 2009, Kidder Wachter Architecture & Design bought the tavern and renovated the building for use as its office.

== See also ==
- List of the oldest buildings in Pennsylvania
- National Register of Historic Places listings in Erie County, Pennsylvania

== Sources ==
- Baxter, Annie Smith (July 24, 1936). "Perry Memorial Building" (PDF). Historic American Buildings Survey. Washington, D.C.: Library of Congress.
- Claridge, John (July 8, 1989). National Register of Historic Places Registration: Pennsylvania SP Dickson Tavern. National Archives and Records Administration. (Downloading may be slow.)
