= Michael Liebel Jr. =

American politician

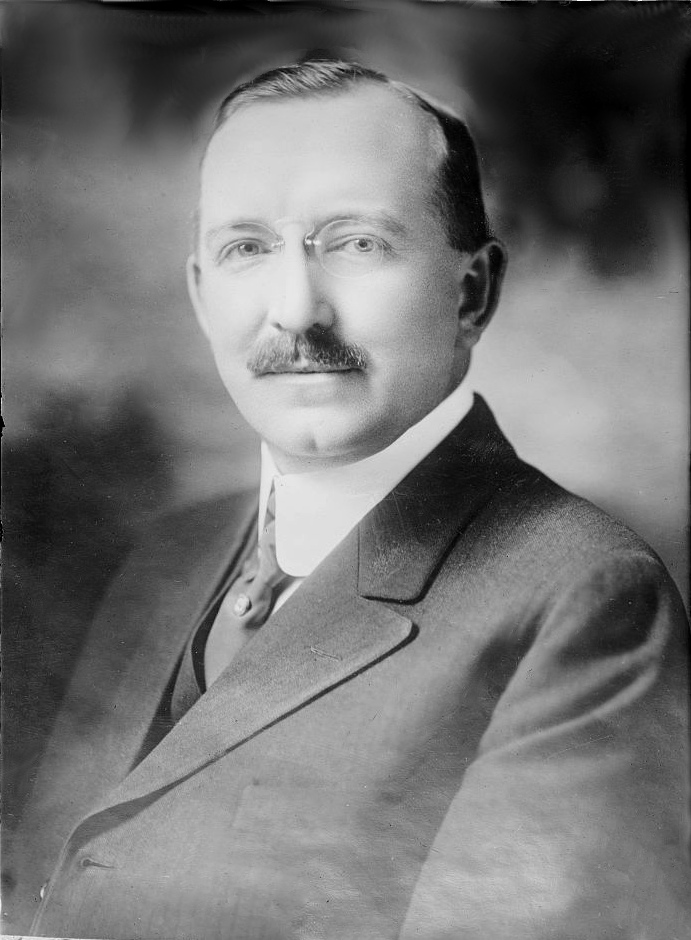

Member of the U.S. House of Representatives from Pennsylvania's 25th district
- In office March 4, 1915 – March 4, 1917
- Preceded by: Milton W. Shreve
- Succeeded by: Henry A. Clark

30th Mayor of Erie, Pennsylvania
- In office 1906–1911
- Preceded by: Robert J. Saltsman
- Succeeded by: William J. Stern

Personal details
- Born: December 12, 1870 Erie, Pennsylvania, US
- Died: August 8, 1927 (aged 56) Philadelphia, Pennsylvania, US
- Resting place: Trinity Cemetery in Erie
- Party: Democratic
- Relations: Reinhard Liebel (uncle)
- Education: Canisius College

Michael Liebel Jr. (December 12, 1870 – August 8, 1927) was an early 20th-century American businessman and politician who served as the Mayor of Erie, Pennsylvania, from 1906 to 1911, and a Democratic member of the United States House of Representatives for one term from Pennsylvania, from 1915 to 1917.

== Early life ==
Liebel was born December 12, 1870, in Erie, Pennsylvania, and is the son of Michael and Clara (née Uhr) Liebel. His father, Michael Liebel Sr. was born June 17, 1843, in Germany and was the son of John and Barbara (née Hammer) Liebel, who also lived in Erie, Pennsylvania. Michael Jr. was one of three sons: Eugene Liebel, who died in 1923, and Frederick W. Liebel, who died in 1896. His father was 14 years old when he came with his parents to Erie from their native Germany. He served an apprenticeship at the shoemaking trade, and in 1861 he started his own boot and shoe business, which he continued for five years. He invested in local real estate with his brother Reinhard Liebel, which eventually became very extensive before his death in May 1906.

Michael Jr. was educated in the public and parochial schools of Erie and attended Canisius College in Buffalo, New York, graduating in 1887.

== Career ==
After graduating from college, Liebel was an accountant in the Buffalo office of the Nickel Plate Railroad for five years. He then returned to Erie, where he was employed in the office of Jackson Koehler, at that time conducting one of the leading breweries of this section of the state, for another five years. In 1898, he organized the Cascade Brewing Company, and was corporate secretary and treasurer until 1890 when it was consolidated with the Erie Brewing Company, which operated until prohibition.

=== Mayor of Erie ===
A member of the Democratic party, Liebel served as Mayor of Erie, Pennsylvania, from 1906 to 1911. His first term started in September, 1906, when he received the appointment to fill a vacancy caused by the death of Mayor Robert J. Saltsman. In the subsequent election of 1907, he was chosen by the popular vote to fill the remainder of the unexpired term until April 1, 1908. Liebel served in office as Mayor until 1911.

After leaving office as Mayor, Liebel organized and became president of the Vulcan Rubber Company which manufactured tires, tubes and hard rubber accessories.

=== United States House of Representatives ===
Liebel ran and was elected the Democratic representative of the 25th district of Pennsylvania to the Sixty-fourth Congress serving in that office from March 4, 1915, until March 4, 1917. While in office, he served on the Naval Committee. In 1916, Liebel challenged A. Mitchell Palmer of Stroudsburg to be the National Committeemean of the Pennsylvania State Democratic Party, but was defeated by Palmer.

He was not a candidate for renomination and after retiring from political office in 1917, he resumed his former business activities as president of the Vulcan Rubber Company, as well as President of the Erie Reduction Company, an Erie-based fertilizer manufacturer, with offices in Sandusky, Ohio.

=== Delegate to the Democratic National Convention ===
Liebel was a delegate to five Democratic National Conventions. His first, while Mayor of Erie, was the 1908 Democratic National Convention followed by the 1912, and the 1916 Convention as a member of the United States House of Representatives. He continued to attend the Conventions as a delegate after leaving elected office, attending the 1920, and 1924 Conventions.

== Personal life and death ==
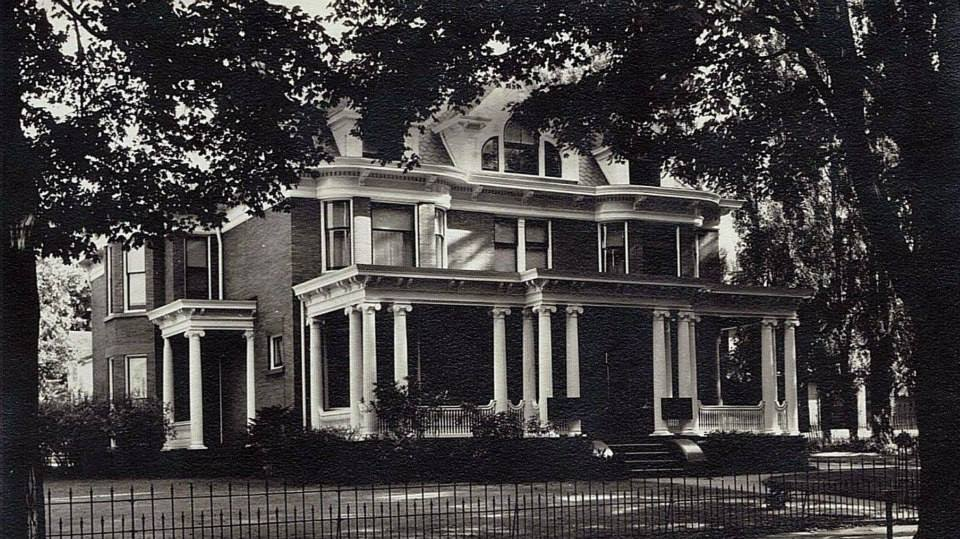
"Michael Liebel House" in Erie, Pennsylvania

Liebel was a lifelong member of the Catholic Church and belonged to the Elks, Eagles and Moose lodges. He was described as "an enterprising and progressive business man" who was "widely known." Liebel died in Philadelphia, Pennsylvania, in 1927, and is interred was at Trinity Cemetery in Erie.

Liebel lived in a home built by his father in 1882 known as the "Michael Liebel House," at 139 West 21st Street in Erie, Pennsylvania. The mansion is an 8,198 sq. ft. Colonial Revival, centered on a large lot and constructed of buff-colored brick. It features a massive porch with Corinthian columns and a bracketed dentiled cornice. Three pedimented dormers adorn the roof which is accented with a cornice matching that of the porch roof. The "Michael Liebel House" is part of the West 21st Street Historic District that was added to the National Register of Historic Places in 1990.

The home was used as the "Merle E. Wood Funeral Home" until 1992. Currently, the "Village at Luther Square," a domestic care provider, owns the building and uses is as a domestic care home that houses several elderly Erieites. VALS purportedly invested over $300,000 in refurbishing this building for its current use.

== See also ==
- List of mayors of Erie, Pennsylvania
- List of representatives from Pennsylvania's 25th congressional district

Political offices
Preceded by Robert J. Saltsman	Mayor of Erie, Pennsylvania; 1906–1911	Succeeded by Bernard Cochran
U.S. House of Representatives
Preceded by Milton W. Shreve	Member of the U.S. House of Representatives from Pennsylvania's 25th congressional district 1915–1917	Succeeded by Henry A. Clark
