= 2025 Erie mayoral election =

Mayoral election in Erie, Pennsylvania

- November 4, 2025
Nominee	Daria Devlin	Matthew Thomas
Party	Democratic	Republican
Popular vote	15,506	4,948
Percentage	74.94%	23.91%
Mayor before election
Joe Schember
Democratic
Elected mayor
Daria Devlin
Democratic

The 2025 Erie mayoral election was held on November 4, 2025, to elect the mayor of Erie, Pennsylvania. The Democratic and Republican primary elections were held on May 20, 2025. Incumbent mayor Joe Schember was defeated in the democratic primary by Daria Devlin, who later won the election.

== Background ==
Joe Schember was first elected in 2017, winning 53% of the vote against Republican John Persinger. Schember lost to Daria Devlin in an upset. No Republican has been elected mayor since 1961.

== Democratic primary ==
=== Candidates ===
==== Nominee ====
- Daria Devlin, member of the Erie School Board

==== Defeated in primary ====
- Joe Schember, incumbent mayor
- Sheila Woeger, state magistrate judge

=== Endorsements ===
Daria Devlin

Political parties

- Erie County Democratic Party

=== Results ===
2025 Erie mayoral election Democratic primary results
Party	Candidate	Votes	%
Democratic	Daria Devlin	5,148	50.20%
Democratic	Joe Schember (incumbent)	4,730	46.12%
Democratic	Sheila Ellyn Woeger	363	3.54%
Total votes		10,256	100.00%

== Republican nomination ==
Lawyer Matthew Thomas was unchallenged for the Republican Party nomination.

=== Candidates ===
==== Nominee ====
- Matthew Thomas, lawyer

== General election ==
=== Results ===
2025 Erie mayoral election results
Party	Candidate	Votes	%
Democratic	Daria Devlin	15,506	74.94%
Republican	Matthew Thomas	4,948	23.91%
Write-in		118	0.57%
Total votes		20,690	100.00%
