= Trinity Cemetery =

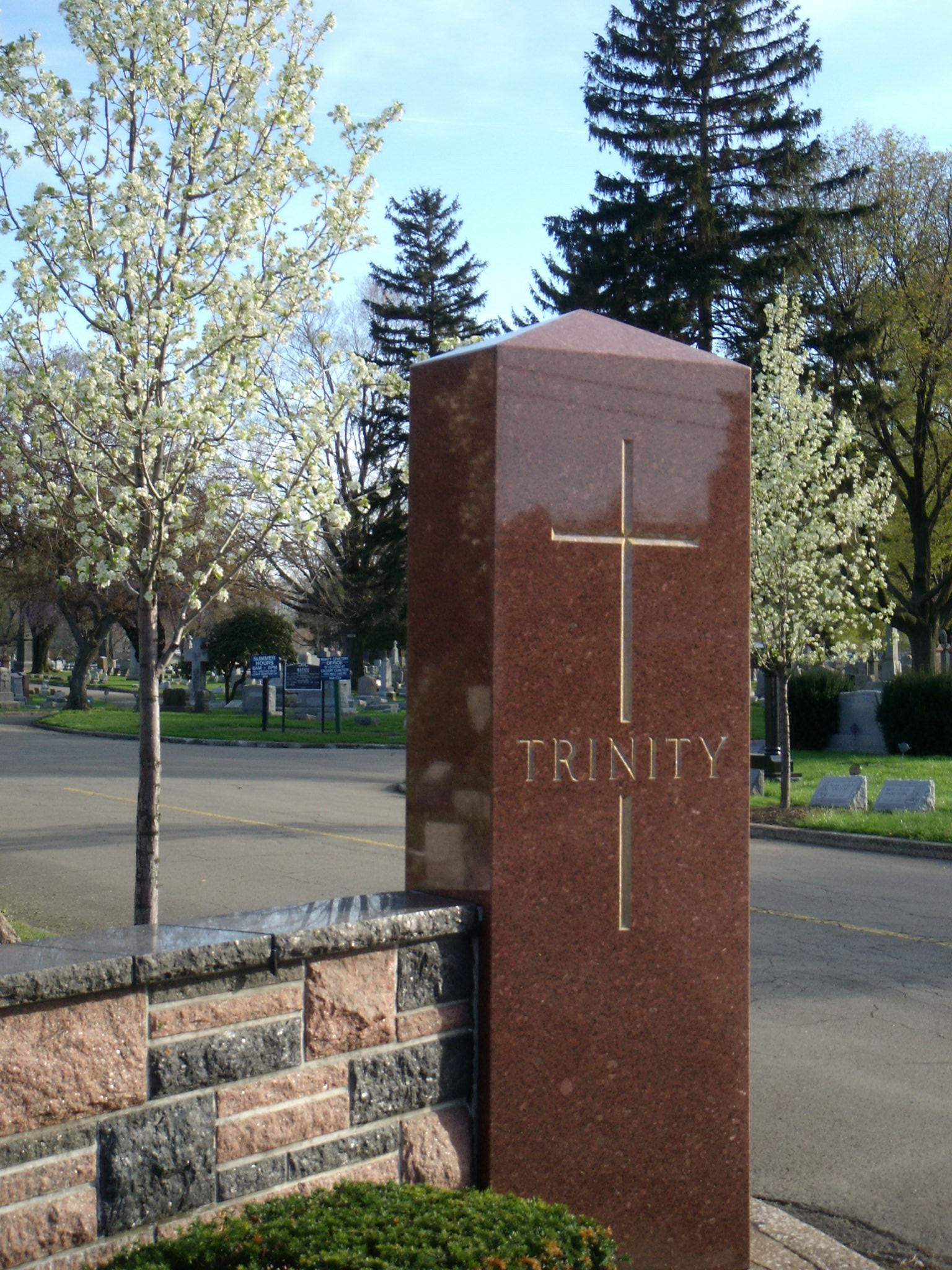
- West Lake Road entrance to the cemetery
- Interactive map of Trinity Cemetery

Details
- Established: 1869
- Location: Erie, Pennsylvania
- Country: United States
- Coordinates: 42.1025°N 80.1508°W
- Type: Private; Catholic
- Owned by: Diocese of Erie
- Size: 30 acres (120,000 m^{2})
- Website: Trinity Cemetery
- Find a Grave: Trinity Cemetery
- The Political Graveyard: Trinity Cemetery

Trinity Cemetery was founded on Trinity Sunday (June 20) in 1869 as the first cemetery of the Roman Catholic Diocese of Erie. It is located on West Lake Road in Erie, Pennsylvania. The parish cemeteries of Holy Trinity and St. Stanislaus were incorporated into Trinity Cemetery.

== History ==
The earliest known Catholic cemetery in Erie was on land purchased on East 9th Street in 1837 and consecrated to that purpose on August 2, 1840. A site on Chestnut Street was acquired by the pastor of St. Mary's Church in 1848 and used by German Catholics. Remains were relocated from the East 9th Street cemetery to the Chestnut Street site during this period. The Chestnut Street cemetery was closed to new interments when Trinity Cemetery opened in 1869.

Circa 1837, St. Patrick's Church purchased a small lot on 3rd Street between German Street and Parade Street as its first cemetery. When 5 acres (20,000 m^{2}) were acquired in 1852 at 24th Street and Sassafras Street, the congregation moved remains from Third Street to the new site. This cemetery was closed to new interments and many bodies relocated to Trinity Cemetery after it opened. As of 1884, some families had refused consent for the bodies of loved ones to be relocated.

Trinity Cemetery, consisting of 30 acres (120,000 m^{2}) of well-appointed walks, driveways, and ornamental trees and located about 4 miles (6.4 km) west of the city, was dedicated on May 23, 1869, in a consecration ceremony conducted by representatives of the diocese and area parishes and witnessed by thousands of local area residents. Bishop Tobias Mullen and a host of local clergy processed from 8th Street to the cemetery that Sunday afternoon.

== Notable interments ==
Notable people buried at Trinity Cemetery:

- Philip Cochran (1910–1979), U.S. Army colonel who fought in World War II and was the inspiration for comic strip characters by Milton Caniff.
- Dell Darling (1863–1904), Major League Baseball catcher for the Chicago White Stockings and appears on the Chicago Cubs and St. Louis Cardinals all-time rosters
- William F. Finneran (1878–1961), Major League Baseball umpire
- James Edward "Gussie" Gannon (1873–1966), Major League Baseball player for the Pittsburgh Pirates
- Michael Liebel, Jr. (1870–1927), Former U.S. Congressman and Mayor of Erie
- Reinhard Liebel, former President of South Erie Iron Works and Member of the Board of Fire Commissioners, Common Council and Select Council of Erie
- Michael Morrison (1869–1955), Major League Baseball pitcher for the Cleveland Spiders, Syracuse Stars, and Baltimore Orioles
- Frank Polaski (1904–1996), politician
- Fitzhugh Townsend (1872–1906), fencer
