= 2021 Erie mayoral election =

Mayoral election in Erie, Pennsylvania

- November 2, 2021
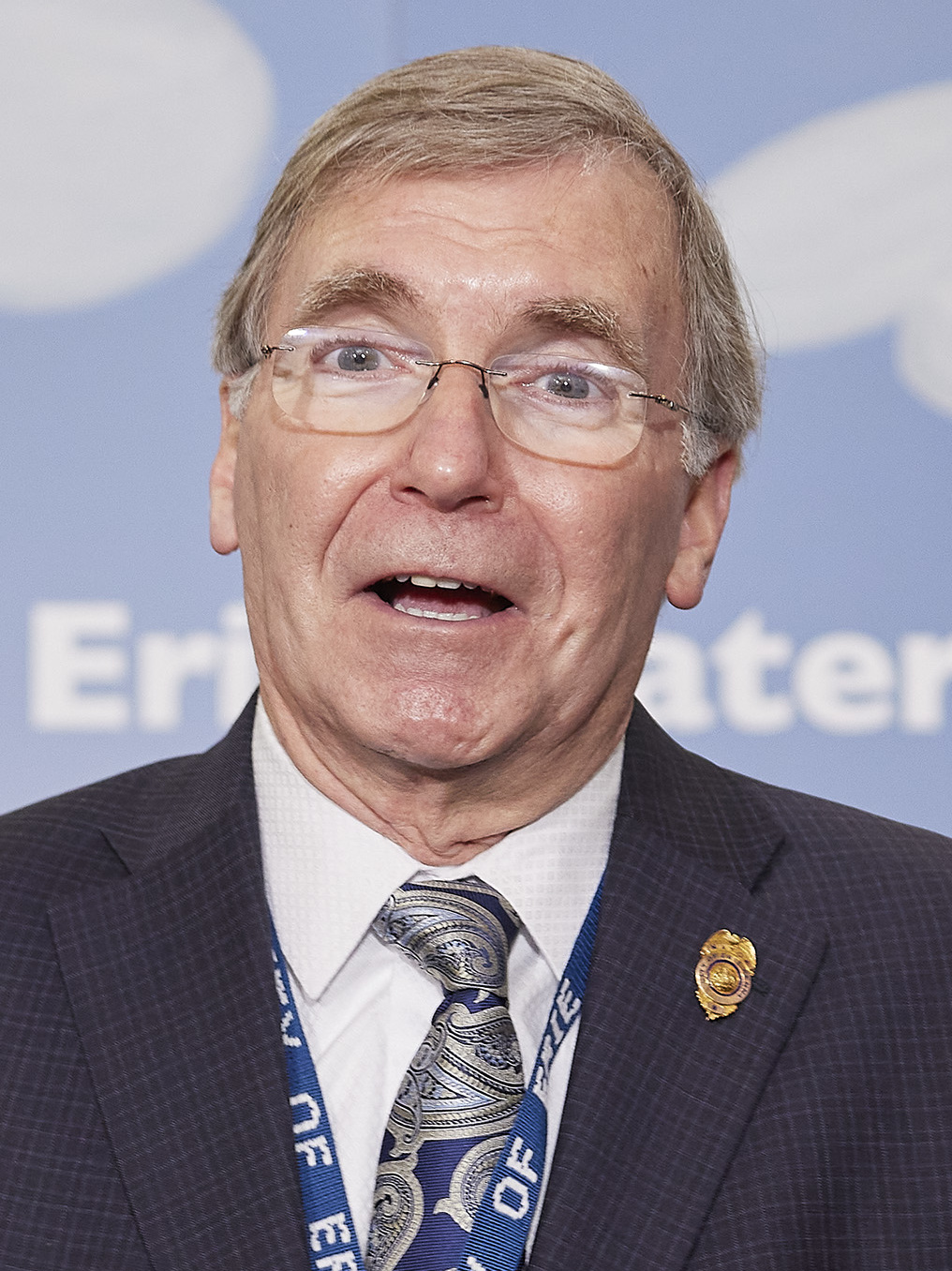
Nominee	Joe Schember
Party	Democratic
Popular vote	14,215
Percentage	95.28%
Mayor before election
Joe Schember
Democratic
Elected mayor
Joe Schember
Democratic

The 2021 Erie mayoral election was held on November 2, 2021, to elect the mayor of Erie, Pennsylvania. Incumbent mayor Joe Schember, seeking a second term, won the election running unopposed in the general election. The primary election for Democrat and Republican candidates were held on May 18, 2021. Incumbent mayor Joe Schember faced two primary challengers, but won securing 74% of the vote. No Republican ran in the primary, and Schember ended up securing the Republican primary as well with write-in votes.

== Background ==
Erie, Pennsylvania votes heavily Democratic in mayoral elections, the last Republican elected to the mayoral position was in 1961. Joe Schember won his first term in the 2017 Erie mayoral general election, winning 53% of the vote against Republican John Persinger.

== Democratic Primary ==
=== Candidates ===
==== Nominee ====
- Joe Schember, incumbent mayor.

==== Defeated in Primary ====
- Tom Spagel, Erie businessman and Erie School Board member.
- Sydney Zimmerman, local activist.

=== Endorsements ===
Joe Schember

People

- Liz Allen, city council member
- Kathy Schaaf, city council member
- Mel Witherspoon, city council member

=== Results ===
2021 Erie mayoral election Democratic primary results
Party	Candidate	Votes	%
Democratic	Joe Schember	6,568	73.97%
Democratic	Tom Spagel	1,604	18.06%
Democratic	Sydney Zimmermann	707	7.96%
Total votes		8,879	100.00%

== Republican Primary ==
No candidate filed for the Republican nomination; all votes were write-ins. Schember received the most votes of any individual candidate.

=== Candidates ===
==== Nominee ====
- Joe Schember

=== Results ===
2021 Erie mayoral election Republican primary results
Party	Candidate	Votes	%
Write-in	Joe Schember	330	33.03%
Write-in	Tom Spagel	305	30.53%
Write-in	Rena Montedoro	236	23.62%
Write-in	Other Write-ins	128	12.81%
Total votes		999	100.00%

== General Election ==
=== Results ===
2021 Erie mayoral election results
Party	Candidate	Votes	%
Democratic	Joe Schember	14,215	95.28%
Write-in		704	4.72%
Total votes		14,919	100.00%
