= Daniel Dobbins =

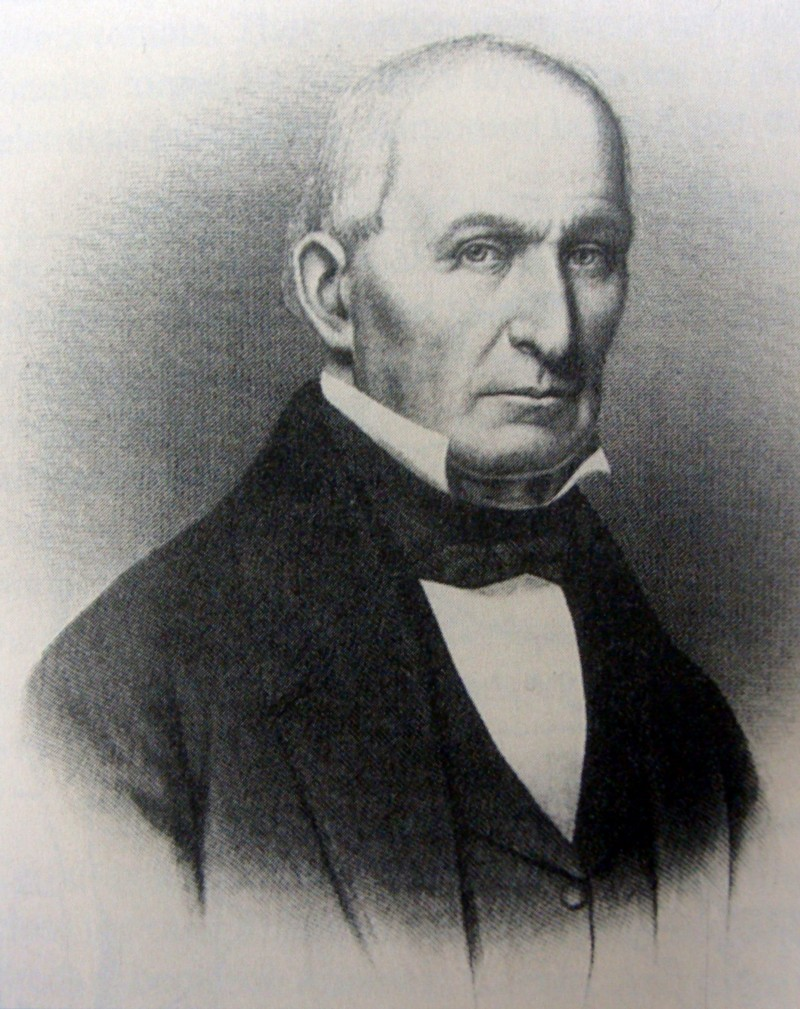
- Born: January 5, 1776; Mifflin County, Pennsylvania, British America
- Died: February 29, 1856 (aged 80); Erie, Pennsylvania, US
- Burial place: Erie Cemetery
- Military career
- Branch: U.S. Navy; U.S. Revenue Cutter Service
- Service years: 1812–1849
- Rank: Captain
- Commands: USS Ohio; USRC Benjamin Rush; USRC Erie; USRC Taney
- Conflicts: War of 1812

Daniel Dobbins (January 5, 1776 – February 29, 1856) was a sailing master in the United States Navy and captain in the United States Revenue Cutter Service. He fought in the War of 1812 and was in charge of the building of the ships at Erie, Pennsylvania, that Oliver Hazard Perry commanded in the Battle of Lake Erie.

== Early life ==
He was born on January 5, 1776 (date from Dobbins' headstone, Erie Cemetery) in Mifflin County, Pennsylvania, near Lewistown. He traveled to Erie in 1795 with Judah Colt and a group of surveyors with the Pennsylvania Population Company. Colt's interest in expanding into lake transportation is what causes Dobbins to eventually become a merchant mariner. In 1809, Dobbins, with Rufus S. Reed, purchases the schooner Catherine, which he renamed the Salina.

Dobbins was known as being a man of "remarkable temperament" who was a known prankster. A biographer described one of his pranks: "On one occasion, while anchored by a group of islands near the west end of Lake Erie, Barney decided to explore one of the islands and left in a small boat with his gun and dog. He promised he would be back shortly. Dobbins got tired of waiting, and hoping to frighten his friend a bit, pulled anchor and sailed around the island out of sight of the unsuspecting Barney. He naturally planned to return after his friend had several moments of panic, but a sudden storm arose and forced Dobbins away from the island. Assured that his friend was in no danger, he returned to the port of Erie. Poor Barney remained on the island for three days until the weather cleared and he was rescued."

== War of 1812 ==
While in port at Mackinac Island, Dobbins, along with Rufus S. Reed and William W. Reed were captured when the British raided Fort Michilimackinac on July 17, 1812. They were paroled after they took an oath that they would not "take up arms against the United Kingdom," which Dobbins refused to take. The British ordered that he, along with the other prisoners of war, sail to Fort Malden. Instead, Dobbins met up with General William Hull at Fort Detroit, where Dobbins was again taken prisoner when General Hull surrendered Detroit to the British on August 16, 1812. When it was realized that Dobbins had broken his promise by "taking up arms in the defense of Detroit" and was in danger of being executed, British Colonel Robert Nichols, a friend of Dobbins before the war, granted him safe passage to Cleveland, Ohio.

After arriving back in Erie, a House Report from February 17, 1824, issued by the Committee of Naval Affairs noted that Dobbins took possession of the house of Jonas Duncan "and used it in storing the United States' iron in it, while building gun boats; that it was subsequently used as a block-maker's shop, until the summer of 1814, when it was accidentally burnt."

Early in 1813, Dobbins traveled to Washington, D.C., and briefed the United States Secretary of the Navy Paul Hamilton on the surrenders of Fort Michilimackinac and Detroit and the strength of the British navy on Lake Erie. When asked where the best place to build ships, Dobbin "unhesitatingly" said Presque Isle because "no finer oak grew than was to be found there, close to the water's edge, and in the land-locked harbor the vessels, when built, could ride in security." Before Dobbins left Washington, D.C., he was given the dimensions of a small gunboat and was made a sailing master in the Navy. After arriving back in Erie, Dobbins set about building a fleet as directed by Secretary Hamilton.

In 1813, upon completion of the fleet, Dobbins was given command of the USS Ohio, a former merchant vessel. On August 17, the fleet departed Erie and headed to Sandusky, Ohio to wait for the British fleet. On August 22, Dobbins was sent with the USS Ohio back to Erie to resupply with fresh provisions. In early September, he was again sent back to Erie for resupply. Dobbins returned to Sandusky on September 13, 1813, three days after the battle.

For the rest of the war, Dobbins and the USS Ohio transported supplies to Detroit for the use during the ground offensives of the war.

== Revenue Cutter Service ==
In 1816, Dobbins navigated the waters of Green Bay, with Colonel John Miller, to establish a fort at the head of the bay. He resigned his naval commission in 1826.

Dobbins lobbied hard for the establishment of a United States Revenue Cutter Service, forerunner to the United States Coast Guard, station at Erie. He was appointed commander of the USRC Benjamin Rush in 1829 by United States President Andrew Jackson after its former commander, Gilbert Knapp, publicly called Jackson "a cutthroat and a murderer." In 1834, Dobbins was given command of the USRC Erie. Dobbins, being a Jackson Democrat, was removed from command and Knapp reinstated when William Henry Harrison, a Whig, was elected in 1841. Dobbins was reinstated in 1845 by President James K. Polk and was put in command of the USRC Taney in Norfolk, Virginia, from 1845 to 1846. Dobbins, who was not pleased with his new command away from Lake Erie, took a leave of absence and was eventually assigned back to the USRC Erie in 1847. He was removed from command and Knapp reinstated again with the election of Zachary Taylor in 1848. The Coast Guard maintains a station at Erie to this day.

Dobbins died in Erie on February 29, 1856, and was buried in the Erie Cemetery. His papers are in the collection of the Buffalo History Museum.

== Sources ==
- Ilesevich, Robert D. (1993). Daniel Dobbins: Frontier Mariner. Erie, Pennsylvania: Erie County Historical Society. ISBN 1-883658-17-9. OCLC 29914721.
- Severance, Frank H. (1905). "The Dobbins Papers". Publications of the Buffalo Historical Society. VIII. Buffalo Historical Society. OCLC 17311624.
- Whitman, Benjamin (1896). Nelson's biographical dictionary and historical reference book of Erie County. Erie, Pennsylvania: S. B. Nelson. pp. 544. OCLC 5507875.
