= Erie Vets =

Defunct American football team

The Erie Vets were an American Association football team that played during the 1950 season, the last of the American Association.

That year, they went 5–3 in the six-team league, finishing second behind only the Richmond Rebels. They then played in the league championship, losing 35–7 to the Rebels.

Prior to their tenure in the American Association, the Vets were an independent team who played in the decades-old Western Pennsylvania circuit. Louis J. Tullio (later the mayor of Erie and the original namesake of Erie's main indoor sports arena) was the team's coach; the team was owned by local car salesman Red Herron. The Veterans played at Erie Veterans Memorial Stadium, the team's namesake.

In 1949 and 1950, the team played the Pittsburgh Steelers in Erie, losing both games.
