= USRC Benjamin Rush =

Ship of the U.S. Revenue Cutter Service

History

United States
- Name: USRC Benjamin Rush
- Namesake: Benjamin Rush
- Builder: John Richards
- Launched: 13 September 1828
- Homeport: Presque Isle, Pennsylvania
- Fate: Sold (1833)

General characteristics
- Displacement: 39 tons

The USRC Benjamin Rush was a United States Revenue Cutter stationed at Presque Isle, Pennsylvania. It was built in 1827 in Erie and was launched on 13 September 1828. The USRC Benjamin Rush has often been confused with the USRC Richard Rush, which was in service at the same time. The ship was named for the signer of the Declaration of Independence, Benjamin Rush.

Daniel Dobbins was in command of the USRC Benjamin Rush from 1829 to 1833. Its successor was the USRC Erie. The USRC Benjamin Rush was sold in 1833.
