= USRC Erie =

Ship of the U.S. Revenue Cutter Service

History

United States
- Name: USRC Erie
- Namesake: Lake Erie
- Builder: John Justice
- Cost: $3,600
- Launched: March 1833
- Homeport: Presque Isle, Pennsylvania
- Fate: Sold (1849)

General characteristics
- Displacement: 60 tons
- Sail plan: Schooner-rigged
- Armament: 1×6 pounder; 1×18 pounder pivot gun

The USRC Erie was a United States Revenue Cutter stationed at Presque Isle in Erie, Pennsylvania. It replaced the USRC Benjamin Rush on the Great Lakes. Daniel Dobbins supervised the construction of and was in command of the USRC Erie from 1833 to 1841. Dobbins was placed back in command of the USRC Erie in 1845. USRC Erie was active in the prevention of the violation of United States neutrality during the Canadian Rebellions of 1837 and was placed under the control of the United States War Department in April 1839.

USRC Erie was sold in Erie on 31 July 1849 for $684.
