= Louis J. Tullio =

American mayor

44th Mayor of Erie, Pennsylvania
- In office 1966 – November 12, 1989
- Preceded by: Charles B. Williamson
- Succeeded by: Joyce A. Savocchio

Personal details
- Born: May 17, 1916 Erie, Pennsylvania, U.S.
- Died: April 17, 1990 (aged 73) Erie, Pennsylvania, U.S.
- Party: Democratic
- Spouse(s): Grace Tullio (1919–2014), Mary Cecilia McHale (1918–1969)
- Education: College of the Holy Cross (BA); Boston University (MEd)

Louis J. Tullio (May 17, 1916 -– April 17, 1990) was an American politician, sports coach, and educator. He served as the Mayor of Erie, Pennsylvania for six terms, from 1966 until 1989 and is to date Erie's longest serving mayor. Tullio was the first Italian American elected to this position. He was the head coach of the Gannon Golden Knights football team from 1949 to 1950, compiling a 14–2 record in two seasons.

== Biography ==
Tullio graduated from the College of the Holy Cross in Worcester, Massachusetts, on a football scholarship, and received a master's degree in education from Boston University. After serving in the Navy in the South Pacific during World War II, he opened a restaurant in Erie and became a high school teacher and football coach, including as head coach of the professional Erie Vets franchise. He lost the 1965 Democratic primary for mayor to Mike Cannavino, who died 11 days before the general election. This allowed Tullio to replace Cannavino on the ballot and defeat Republican incumbent Charles Williamson.

During Tullio’s six terms as mayor he worked to revitalize downtown Erie by pushing for construction of the Bayfront Parkway and a downtown arena. He started We Love Erie Days, now known as Celebrate Erie, and helped preserve the Warner Theatre. His home phone number was listed in the phone book so citizens could contact him. He won re-election five times, and unsuccessfully ran for Congress in 1976.

== Illness ==
Tullio was diagnosed with amyloidosis, a rare disease that also struck then-Pittsburgh mayor Richard Caliguiri and then-Pennsylvania governor Robert P. Casey. In 1987 Tullio felt ill and mentioned his symptoms to Mayor Caliguiri, who told him to be tested for amyloidosis.

Despite his illness, which forced him to cut back on his workload and schedule, Tullio stayed in office and did not appoint an acting mayor until November 12, 1989, shortly before the end of his term. He eventually succumbed to his illness in his home on April 17, 1990.

== Personal life ==
In 1941 Tullio married the former Mary Cecelia McHale, who died in 1969. In 1971 he married the former Grace E. Gunster of Ridgewood, N.J. Tullio had three daughters – Betty Ann Eiswert, Marilyn Lou Krahe, and June Pintea, as well as ten grandchildren.

His funeral Mass was at Saint Peter Cathedral, and he is buried at Calvary Cemetery in Erie.

== Legacy ==
In Erie Tullio has been honored with the Louis J. Tullio Convention Center (now the Erie Insurance Arena), Tullio Athletic Field at Mercyhurst College, and Tullio Towers, an apartment for senior citizens.

== Head coaching record ==
=== College football ===
Year	Team	Overall	Conference	Standing	Bowl/playoffs
Gannon Golden Knights (Independent) (1949–1950)
1949	Gannon	8–0			
1950	Gannon	6–2			
Gannon:		14–2			
Total:		14–2			
