= Strong Vincent =

Union Army brigadier general (1837–1863)

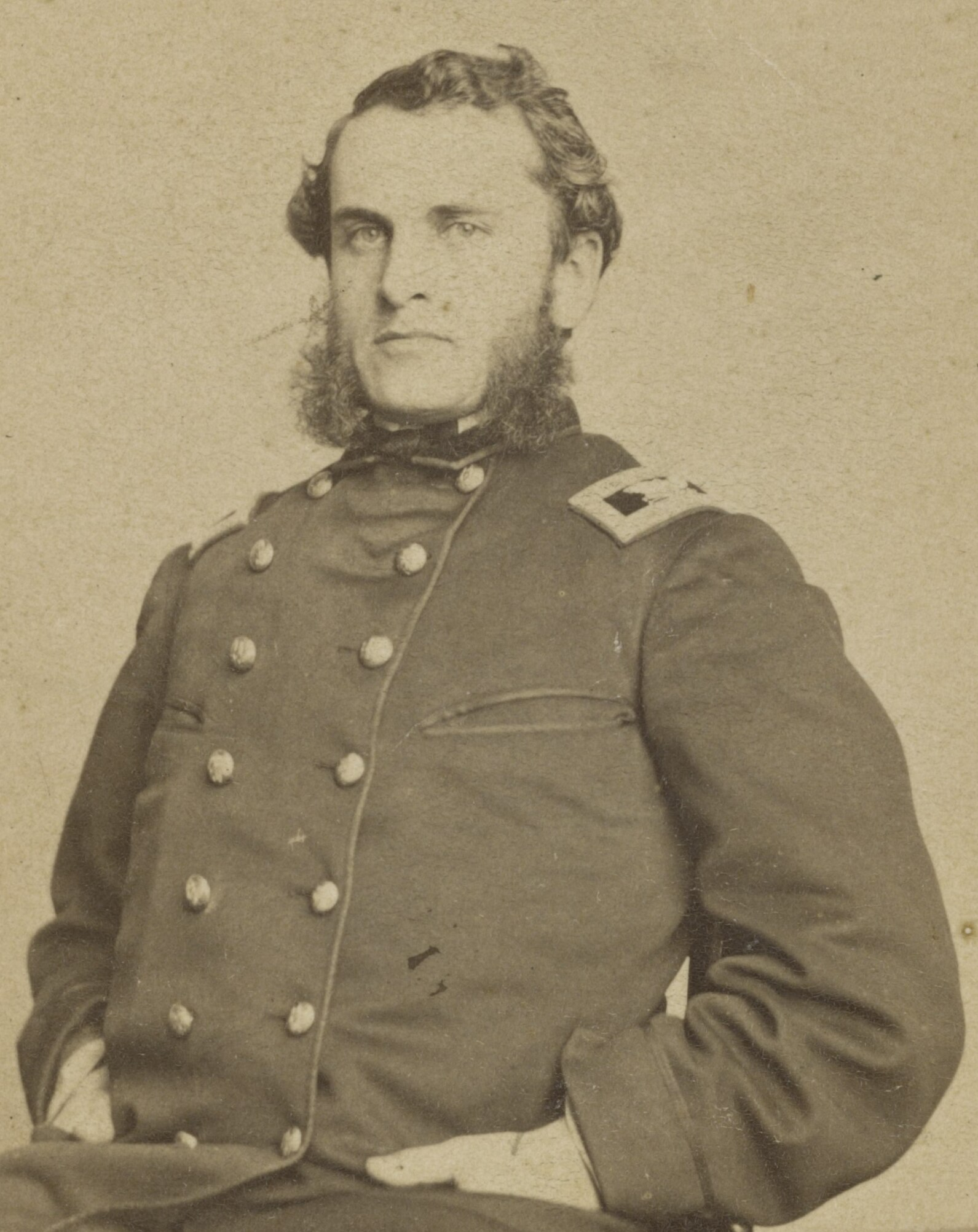
- Vincent as a colonel
- Born: June 17, 1837; Waterford, Pennsylvania, U.S.
- Died: July 7, 1863 (aged 26); Gettysburg, Pennsylvania, U.S.
- Burial place: Erie Cemetery, Erie, Pennsylvania, U.S.
- Military career
- Allegiance: United States
- Branch: United States Army (Union Army)
- Service years: 1861–1863
- Rank: Brigadier general
- Units: Erie Regiment
- Commands: 83rd Pennsylvania Infantry; 3rd Brigade, 1st Division, V Corps
- Conflicts: American Civil War Battle of Gaines's Mill Battle of Fredericksburg Battle of Gettysburg (DOW)

Strong Vincent (June 17, 1837 – July 7, 1863) was a lawyer who became famous as a U.S. Army officer during the American Civil War. He was mortally wounded while leading his brigade during the fighting at Little Round Top on the second day of the Battle of Gettysburg and died five days later.

== Early life and education ==
Vincent was born in Waterford, Pennsylvania, son of iron foundryman B. B. Vincent and Sarah Ann (née Strong). He attended Trinity College and Harvard University, graduating in 1859. He practiced law in Erie, Pennsylvania.

== American Civil War ==
At the start of the American Civil War, Vincent joined the Pennsylvania Militia as an adjutant and first lieutenant of the Erie Regiment. On September 14, 1861, he was commissioned lieutenant colonel of the 83rd Pennsylvania Infantry and was promoted to colonel the following June. After the death of his regimental commander in the Seven Days Battles (at the Battle of Gaines's Mill), Vincent assumed command of the regiment. He developed malaria on the Virginia Peninsula and was on medical leave until the Battle of Fredericksburg in December 1862. On May 20, 1863, he assumed command of the 3rd Brigade, 1st Division, V Corps, Army of the Potomac, replacing his brigade commander, who resigned after the Battle of Chancellorsville.

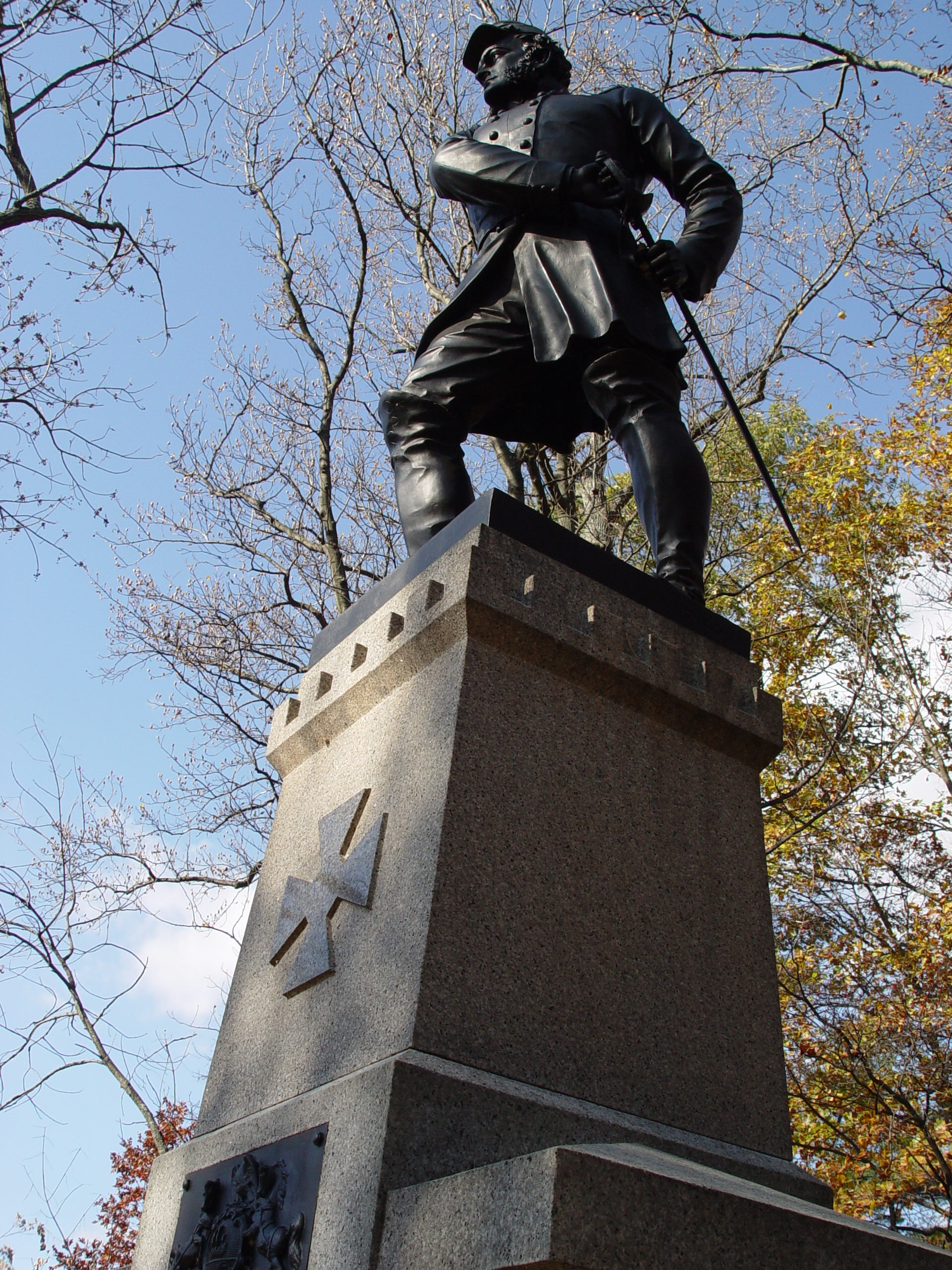
Likeness of Col. Vincent atop the 83rd Pennsylvania Infantry monument, Gettysburg National Military Park near the spot where Vincent was mortally wounded

At the Battle of Gettysburg, 26-year-old Vincent and his brigade arrived on July 2, 1863. He had started the Gettysburg campaign knowing that his young wife, Elizabeth H. Carter, whom he had married on the day he enlisted in the army, was pregnant with their first child. He had written her, "If I fall, remember you have given your husband to the most righteous cause that ever widowed a woman."

Maj. Gen. Daniel E. Sickles of the III Corps had deviated from his orders, moving his corps to a position that left undefended a significant terrain feature: Little Round Top. The chief engineer of the Army of the Potomac, Brig. Gen. Gouverneur K. Warren, recognized the tactical importance of the hill and urgently sought Union troops to occupy it before the Confederates could. A staff officer sent by Warren encountered Vincent's brigade nearby. Without consulting his superior officers, Vincent decided that his brigade was in the ideal position to defend Little Round Top, saying "I will take the responsibility to take my brigade there." Pvt. Oliver Willcox Norton, Vincent's brigade standard bearer and bugler, later wrote that he and Vincent made a reconnaissance of the Confederate forces as the brigade was moving into position, "While our line was forming on the hill at Gettysburg, I came out with him in full view of the rebel lines. They opened two batteries on us instantly, firing at the colors. Colonel Vincent looked to see what was drawing the fire and yelled at me, "Down with the flag, Norton! Damn it, go behind the rocks with it." (Note: Norton was a member of the 83rd Pennsylvania, which Vincent commanded before becoming its brigade commander.)

The pennant of the 3rd Brigade

One of Vincent's regiments, the 20th Maine led by Colonel Joshua Lawrence Chamberlain, has received most of the fame for the defense of Little Round Top, but there is little doubt that the efforts and bravery of Vincent were instrumental in the eventual Union victory. Vincent impressed upon Chamberlain the importance of his position on the brigade's left flank and then left to attend to the brigade's right flank. There, the 16th Michigan Infantry was starting to yield to enemy pressure. Mounting a large boulder, Vincent brandished a riding crop given to him by his wife and shouted to his men "Don't give an inch!" A bullet struck him through the thigh and the groin and he fell. Due to the determination of the 20th Maine, the 44th New York, the 83rd Pennsylvania, and the 16th Michigan Infantry, the Union line held against the Confederate onslaught. Vincent was carried from the hill to a nearby farm, where he lay dying for the next five days, unable to be transported home due to the severity of his injury.

Maj. Gen. George G. Meade, the commander at the time of the Army of the Potomac, recommended Vincent for promotion to brigadier general on the evening of July 2. The promotion was dated July 3, 1863, but it is doubtful that Vincent knew about the appointment before he died (Note: On p. 614, Eicher states that this promotion was not confirmed by the United States Senate and therefore does not list him as a general.) (although Pvt. Oliver Willcox Norton in Army Letters 1861-1865 writes "His commission as Brigadier General was read to him on his deathbed.") Vincent's wife gave birth to a baby girl two months later; she died before reaching the age of one and is buried next to her father.

His corps commander, Maj. Gen. George Sykes, described Vincent's actions in his official report from the battle:

Night closed the fight. The key of the battle-field was in our possession intact. Vincent, Weed, and Hazlett, chiefs lamented throughout the corps and army, sealed with their lives the spot intrusted to their keeping, and on which so much depended. ... General Weed and Colonel Vincent, officers of rare promise, gave their lives to their country.

— George Sykes, report on the Battle of Gettysburg

== Legacy ==
Statue at Blasco Library in Erie, Pennsylvania

Vincent is buried in Erie Cemetery. In Erie, he is memorialized by a statue erected in 1997 at Blasco Memorial Library and by Strong Vincent Middle School.

Vincent served as the likeness for the statue on the 83rd Pennsylvania Infantry monument on Little Round Top, dedicated in 1899. A nearby monument is dedicated to him. Beside the 44th and 12th New York Infantry Monument on Little Round Top, a rock bears the inscription "Gel. Strong Vincent fell here/Com'g 3d. Brig. 1st Div. 5 Corp/July 2nd. 1863." The portion of Little Round Top to the southeast of Sykes Avenue on the Gettysburg Battlefield is known as "Vincent's Spur."

The 1-112 Infantry of the Pennsylvania Army National Guard stationed in Cambridge Springs uses the call sign "STRONG" in recognition of Vincent's courage, determination, and sacrifice.

== In popular culture ==
- Vincent is a character in the novel The Killer Angels by Michael Shaara. In its 1993 film adaptation Gettysburg, he is portrayed by Maxwell Caulfield.
- Vincent is a character in the alternate history novel "Gettysburg: A Novel of the Civil War" by Newt Gingrich and William R. Forstchen.

== See also ==
- List of American Civil War generals (Union)
