= Miles Brown Kitts =

American politician (1880–1947)

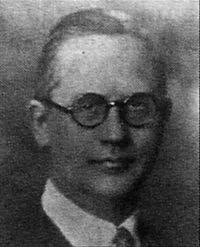

34th Mayor of Erie, Pennsylvania
- In office 1916–1924
- Preceded by: Bernard Veit
- Succeeded by: Joseph Williams

Member of the Pennsylvania Senate from the 49th district
- In office January 1, 1924 – November 30, 1932

Personal details
- Born: April 24, 1880 Summit Township, Pennsylvania
- Died: May 27, 1947 (aged 67)
- Party: Republican
- Education: Edinboro State Normal School

Miles Brown Kitts (April 24, 1880 – May 27, 1947) was a Republican mayor of Erie, Pennsylvania who served as mayor during World War I and the Roaring Twenties. He is considered to have been one of the "most colorful" mayors because he brought about great changes to Erie but, was also investigated by a grand jury in 1921 and almost was indicted.

== Early life ==
Miles Kitts was born on April 24, 1880, in Summit Township, Pennsylvania. He attended the county schools of Old Waterford Academy and the Edinboro State Normal School. Kitts went on to teach at Glenwood School in Erie. He studied law under Aaron Albert Freeman and was admitted to the bar on October 28, 1907. He also practiced law with former Congressman Milton W. Shreve.

== Political life ==
In 1908, Kitts unsuccessfully ran for county school superintendent. He ran for district attorney in 1910, but was also defeated. In 1913, Kitts won the election for membership on the City of Erie General Assembly. During the mayoral elections of 1915, the Democratic candidate Bernard Veit defeated incumbent mayor William J. Stern but died before he could be sworn in. Former mayor and Erie's Democratic "political boss" Michael Liebel gave the Democratic nomination to Kitts. A special election was held on February 20, 1916. Under the rules of the special election, a candidate needed 4,840 votes to win. Kitts lost by a margin of 204 votes and had to face Stern in a run-off election. The run-off election was held on February 29 (making it the only leap day election in Erie history). Even more strange was that the Republican Kitts was running on a Democratic "ticket", while his opponent, Stern, was a Democrat running on a Republican ticket.

== Accomplishments ==
One of biggest accomplishments of Kitts's administration was the installation of the "Mill Creek tube". It was designed to prevent the Mill Creek from flooding downtown Erie, as it had on August 3, 1915. Kitts also put into action the building of the Perry Monument on Presque Isle to commemorate the Battle of Lake Erie. During World War I, Kitts was known to personally send off every train carrying troops destined for Europe that left from Erie. Kitts also introduced ordinances to reorganize the Erie Police Department and increased the chief's salary to $2,100 a year.

== Scandal ==
When the Prohibition went into effect in 1920, "the only dry [alcohol free] thing in Erie was the inside of a light bulb." Speakeasies, casinos, and brothels were commonplace in Erie before Kitts took office, but when Kitts was elected the situation got out of hand. Reformists in the Republican party did not approve of this. When the 1920 mayoral election came up, the reformers supported their own candidate but Kitts was re-elected. The reformers became known as the "Committee of Sixteen" and demanded Erie's numerous "vices" be cleaned up. A grand jury was formed and most of the city government came under investigation, with over a hundred witnesses called to testify, including 47 members of the Erie Police Department. Kitts would have indicted but the charges were dismissed because women had been members of the grand jury. Kitts continued to serve as mayor until 1924 and did not seek re-election again. Kitts said:

After eight long years of such sacrifices, I am without funds, and this office has greatly interfered with my law practice. I could not go on for four more years in the event of a political success without losing my identity as a lawyer. My finances, as well, are depleted, thus preventing me from participating in this campaign.

== Later work ==
When Joseph C. Williams succeeded Kitts as mayor, Kitts was elected to the Pennsylvania State Senate for two terms. In 1935, Kitts became the president judge of the Erie County Court of Common Pleas. Kitts was eventually removed from this position by a petition to the Pennsylvania Supreme Court citing "mental incapacity" shortly before his death in 1947.
