= USS Ohio (1812) =

Schooner

History

United States
- Name: Ohio
- Launched: 1810
- Acquired: 1812
- Commissioned: 13 June 1813
- Captured: 12 August 1814

United Kingdom
- Name: HMS Sauk
- Acquired: Captured 12 August 1814

General characteristics
- Type: Schooner
- Displacement: 62 tons
- Complement: 35
- Armament: 1 × 24 pounder

USS Ohio was a schooner "launched at Cleveland in 1810 by merchants named Murray and Bigsbey." purchased by the US Navy in 1812; converted to a warship by Henry Eckford; and commissioned prior to 13 June 1813, with Sailing Master Daniel Dobbins in command.

Ohio served on Lake Erie in the squadron commanded by Captain Oliver Hazard Perry during the War of 1812. The squadron's mission was to wrest control of the lake from the British. With four other purchased ships, Ohio lay at Black Rock below the Falls in the Niagara River, prevented by British blockade from entering Lake Erie. Finally, in a combined operation with the Army, Perry was able to bring the ships out to join the remainder of the squadron in Presque Isle Bay at Erie, Pennsylvania. Ohio arrived at Erie on 8 July 1813.

After searching for the British, the squadron anchored at Sandusky on 17 August. Ohio returned to Erie for provisions and stores for the squadron, rejoining her sister ships on 3 September. The same day she set sail for Erie again, and thus was not with the squadron when it won the memorable victory over the British at Put-in Bay on 10 September. Three days later Ohio reached Put-in Bay with sorely needed fresh vegetables and meat.

As soon as the ice cleared in early 1814, Ohio began patrolling between Long Point and Erie to intercept any British movement by water. In May she assisted in fitting out prizes Queen Charlotte and HMS Detroit at Put-in Bay, and convoyed them to Erie.

On 12 August 1814, Ohio was captured along with the schooner USS Somers by the British within pistol shot of Fort Erie. Somers was renamed Huron while Ohio was renamed Sauk. "[T]he Sauk (ex-Ohio) and Huron (ex-Somers) were taken up Chippewa Creek and submerged in one of its tributaries, Street's Creek, just in case the American tried to recapture them in a raid across the Niagara." The schooners were raised and refitted in the spring of 1815. They both wintered at the Royal Navy station at the mouth of the Grand River.

The Ohio's subsequent history is unknown after 1817.
