= Joseph E. Sinnott =

American politician

Joseph Sinnott

47th Mayor of Erie, Pennsylvania
- In office January 2, 2006 – January 2, 2018
- Preceded by: Rick Filippi
- Succeeded by: Joe Schember

Personal details
- Born: 1966 (age 59–60)
- Party: Democratic
- Education: Gannon University; Case Western Reserve University School of Law
- Occupation: Chemist, Attorney

Joseph E. "Joe" Sinnott (born c. 1966) was the 50th mayor of Erie, Pennsylvania. A Democrat, he served three terms from January 2, 2006, to January 2, 2018. He was succeeded by Joseph Schember.

== Biography ==
A lifelong resident of Erie, Sinnott graduated from Academy High School in 1984, and Gannon University in 1988 with a B.S. in chemistry. He worked as the Industrial Pretreatment Chemist/Coordinator for the City of Erie for eight years. He was accepted to Case Western Reserve University School of Law in 1996 and graduated in 1999. He joined the firm of Quinn, Buseck, Leemhuis, Toohey & Kroto in Erie, concentrating on environmental and commercial litigation and later practiced municipal and family law with Erie's Carney & Good for several years.

In 2003, Sinnott was elected to the city council for a four-year term. In 2005, he successfully ran for mayor of Erie, taking office on January 2, 2006. He was reelected in 2009 and again in 2013.

Sinnot's parents, Edward and Gloria, were public school teachers.

== See also ==
- List of mayors of Erie, Pennsylvania
