= Jackson Koehler Eagle Brewery =

- U.S. National Register of Historic Places
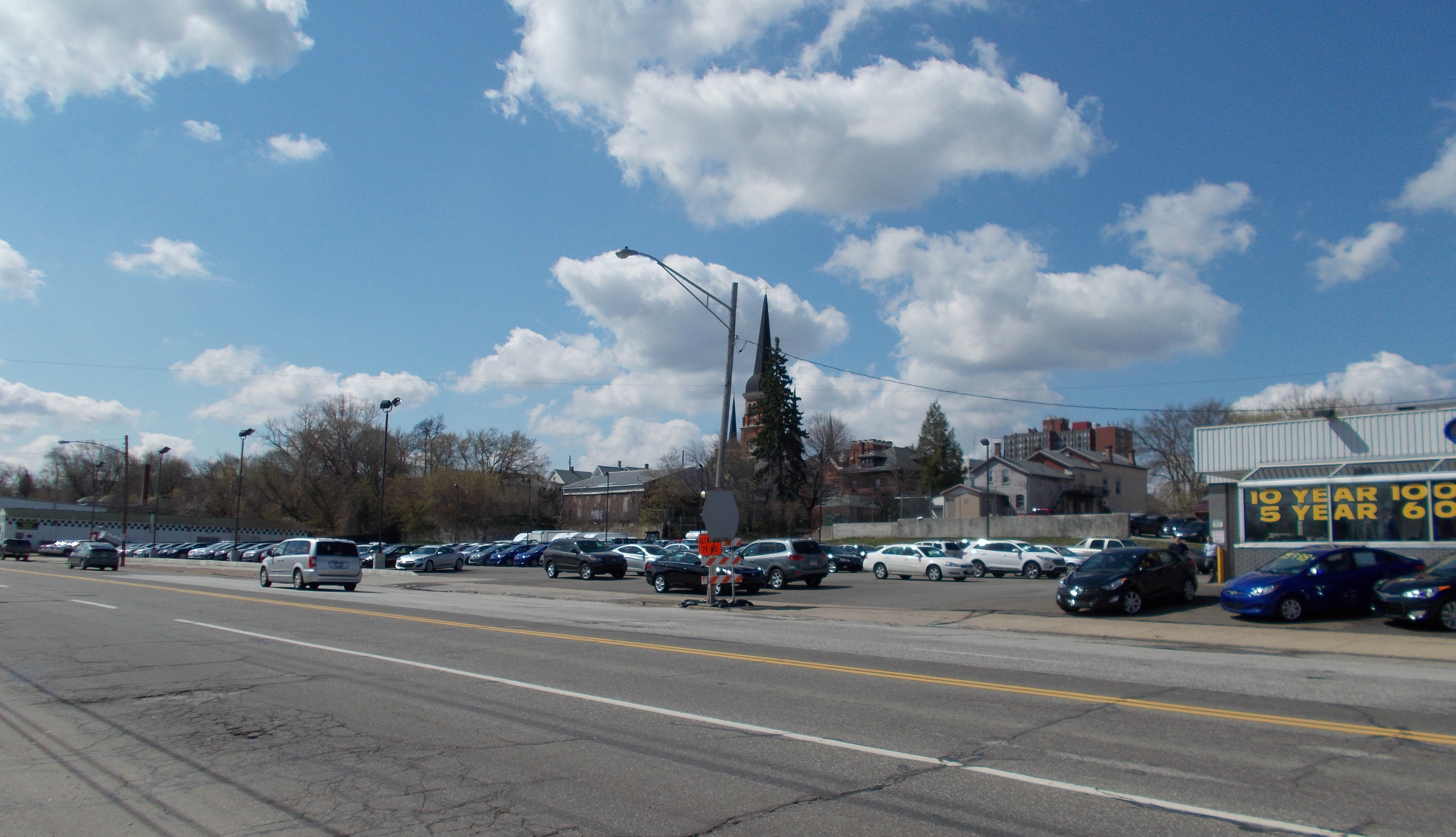
- Site of the Jackson Koehler Eagle Brewery, April 2013

- Location within Pennsylvania Location within the United States
- Location: 2131 State St., Erie, Pennsylvania
- Coordinates: 42°6′55″N 80°4′20″W
- Area: 1.1 acres (0.45 ha)
- Built: 1891
- Architect: Louis Lehle
- Architectural style: Germanesque-Teutonic
- NRHP reference No.: 82003785
- Added to NRHP: April 13, 1982

The Jackson Koehler Eagle Brewery was a historic brewery complex which was located in Erie, Erie County, Pennsylvania, United States.

This brewery building was added to the National Register of Historic Places in 1982, but was demolished in 2006.

== History and architectural features ==
The original section of this historic structure, which was built in 1891, consisted of a brewhouse with grain tower, racking room, filter room, and keg wash room. Later additions include the storage cellar, keg receiving and storage rooms (1933, later demolished), and rathskeller (1936). The complex was made of brick, using Germanesque-Teutonic-style influences. A brewery that was sited here as early as 1855 was established by J. Henry Kalvelage. The Eagle Brewery merged into the Erie Brewing Company in 1899. The Erie Brewing Company closed in 1978.

== See also ==
- List of defunct breweries in the United States
