= James Patrick Rossiter =

American politician

36th Mayor of Erie, Pennsylvania
- In office 1932–1936
- Preceded by: Joseph C. Williams
- Succeeded by: Charles R. Barber

Personal details
- Born: September 13, 1890 Philadelphia, Pennsylvania
- Died: September 26, 1943 (aged 53) Erie, Pennsylvania
- Party: Democratic Party
- Education: Georgetown University Law School

James Patrick Rossiter (September 13, 1890, in Philadelphia, Pennsylvania – September 26, 1943, in Erie, Pennsylvania) was a prominent politician in Pennsylvania.

== Family ==
He was the second of seven children of Louis T. Rossiter, an insurance company superintendent, and his wife Elizabeth C. "Lizzie" (Griffin) Rossiter. The family moved to the Philadelphia suburbs in New Jersey after James was born and by 1900 was living in the town of Wenonah in Gloucester County. His father brought the family to Erie in 1903, where he again worked in the insurance field. By 1910, the family lived at 439 West Fifth Street, just off Erie's posh Millionaires Row, which runs along West Sixth Street between Perry Square and Gridley Park. After World War I, he returned to living with his parents at their West Fifth Street home. In 1930, he and two adult siblings were living with their widowed father at 616 West Ninth Street, just southwest of their West Fifth Street homestead.

== Education ==
He attended the Burns School in Erie and graduated Erie High School in 1910. He studied pre-law at the Pennsylvania State College, where he served one year in ROTC as a condition of his attendance at what was then a land-grant college. He finished his law studies at Georgetown University Law School, where he graduated in 1916.

== Military service ==
Regarding Rossiter's service in World War I, John G. Carney's "Highlights of Erie Politics" says that Rossiter enlisted in the US Army as a private, served eighteen months, and left as a captain. His New York Times obituary says Rossiter served as a lieutenant in an artillery unit in World War I. He was among the founders of the Roger Israel Post 11 of the American Legion and actively promoted the cause of veterans.

== Career ==
Rossiter was a lawyer in Erie when he registered for military service in June 1917. After the war, he resumed his legal work from his parents' West Fifth Street home.

He was admitted to the bar and practiced law in the District of Columbia and Erie County, Pennsylvania. He appeared before the District of Columbia court, United States District Court for the Western District of Pennsylvania, the Supreme Court of Pennsylvania, and the Supreme Court of the United States. He was a lawyer in private practice living in Erie when he registered for the draft in 1943.

He served as mayor of Erie, Pennsylvania, from 1932 to 1936.

After the mayoralty, he was appointed chief counsel to Pennsylvania's General State Authority in 1937. He resigned that post effective 31 July 1939 and was considering the Democratic candidacy for judge of the Erie County Court of Common Pleas. He was to be replaced in the general counsel position by Winfred D. Lewis of Lansford, Pennsylvania

He was an unsuccessful candidate for judge of the Superior Court of Pennsylvania in 1928. He served as assistant district attorney for the Western District of Pennsylvania, but twice failed in his bid for the position of district attorney.

He was the supportive Democratic Party chairman for Erie County when Democratic-Liberal candidate for state governor John Hemphill visited Erie in October 1930, pushing for repeal of the Eighteenth Amendment. He represented his party to three of its national conventions. He seconded the nomination of former Governor Alfred E. Smith as the presidential candidate at the 1932 Democratic National Convention. He was also named to attend the 1936 Democratic National Convention.
