= Judah Colt =

- Born: July 1, 1761; Lyme, Connecticut
- Died: October 11, 1832 (aged 71); Erie, Pennsylvania
- Resting place: Erie Cemetery
- Known for: Settling Erie County

Judah Colt (July 1, 1761 – October 11, 1832) was an early pioneer of Erie County.

== Early life ==
Colt was born on July 1, 1761, in Lyme, Connecticut. After the death of his father, Colt decided to move west in 1789 and in Albany, New York, joined Oliver Phelps heading for the Genesee Lands. There he purchased land in Canadarque, later known as Canandaigua, from Phelps. In Canandaigua, Colt worked as a surveyor, merchant, and farmer and commonly returned to Lyme, Connecticut during the winter. He was appointed sheriff of Ontario County in 1790. In 1795 he traveled with Augustus Porter to Presque Isle and purchased land from the Pennsylvania Population Company in Erie County, Pennsylvania. In 1796, he attempted to buy thousands of acres of land from the Pennsylvania Population Company, but they declined, hiring him instead to replace Thomas Rees, Jr. as their agent.

== Colt's Station ==
Colt established Colt's Station in 1797 in present-day Greenfield. That same year he built the "earliest road after the American occupation" in Erie County (after Old French Road) as a supply route from Lake Erie. Soon goods that were traveling by ship from Buffalo, New York, to Erie were being transported overland to his settlement. He extended the road in early 1798 to French Creek, where he established a boat landing. He continued the road to the forks of the creek at Wattsburg later that same year.

Colt's wife joined him at Colt's Station in May 1798. In the absence of a minister, Colt conducted the first Protestant service in the county on July 2, 1797.

== City life ==
Colt realized that prosperity would be found near the lake, so he left Colt's Station for Erie in 1804. He joined the Presbyterian church in Erie that formed in September 1815, attending worship services in the old court house and soon becoming an elder. He built a frame building on Sassafras Street, known locally as the "yellow meeting house", which became the first regular place of worship in Erie. Colt was elected a member of the American Antiquarian Society in July 1815.

He served three terms as Burgess in Erie (1813, 1820-1821). Colt died in Erie on October 11, 1832, and is buried in the Erie Cemetery.
