= William Himrod =

William Himrod (1791-1873) was a pioneer of the iron industry in Erie, Pennsylvania. He is interred at Erie Cemetery.

Himrod was born on 19 May 1791 in Turbot Township, Pennsylvania.

Himrod was a partner in the firm of Johnson, Himrod and Company, an Erie ironworks that developed in the wake of the Panic of 1837. The company was renamed Vincent, Himrod, and Company in 1841 when he joined B. B. Vincent in business. They operated the first blast furnace in Erie County at the company's Twelfth Street and French Street facility beginning in 1843. The ironworks employed dozens if not hundreds of local workers, while its use of locally obtained iron ore employed yet others in the greater metro Erie area. The company was renamed several times, including the Erie City Iron Works. In 1876 it became the joint stock company Chicago and Erie Stove Company, Ltd, which was also known as the Chicago and Erie Stove Works.

Himrod resided at the corner of Second Street and French Street for nearly fifty years. On 22 December 1839, he founded a Sunday School for African Americans and the destitute. He operated the school, which came to be known as the Himrod Mission, for nearly twenty years despite how it directly conflicted with the Fugitive Slave Act of 1793. Himrod was also involved in the Underground Railroad. The school was still in operation under his name in the mid-1880s.

He died 21 June 1873 in Erie, Pennsylvania.
