= West 21st Street Historic District =

Historic district in Pennsylvania, United States

- U.S. National Register of Historic Places
- U.S. Historic district
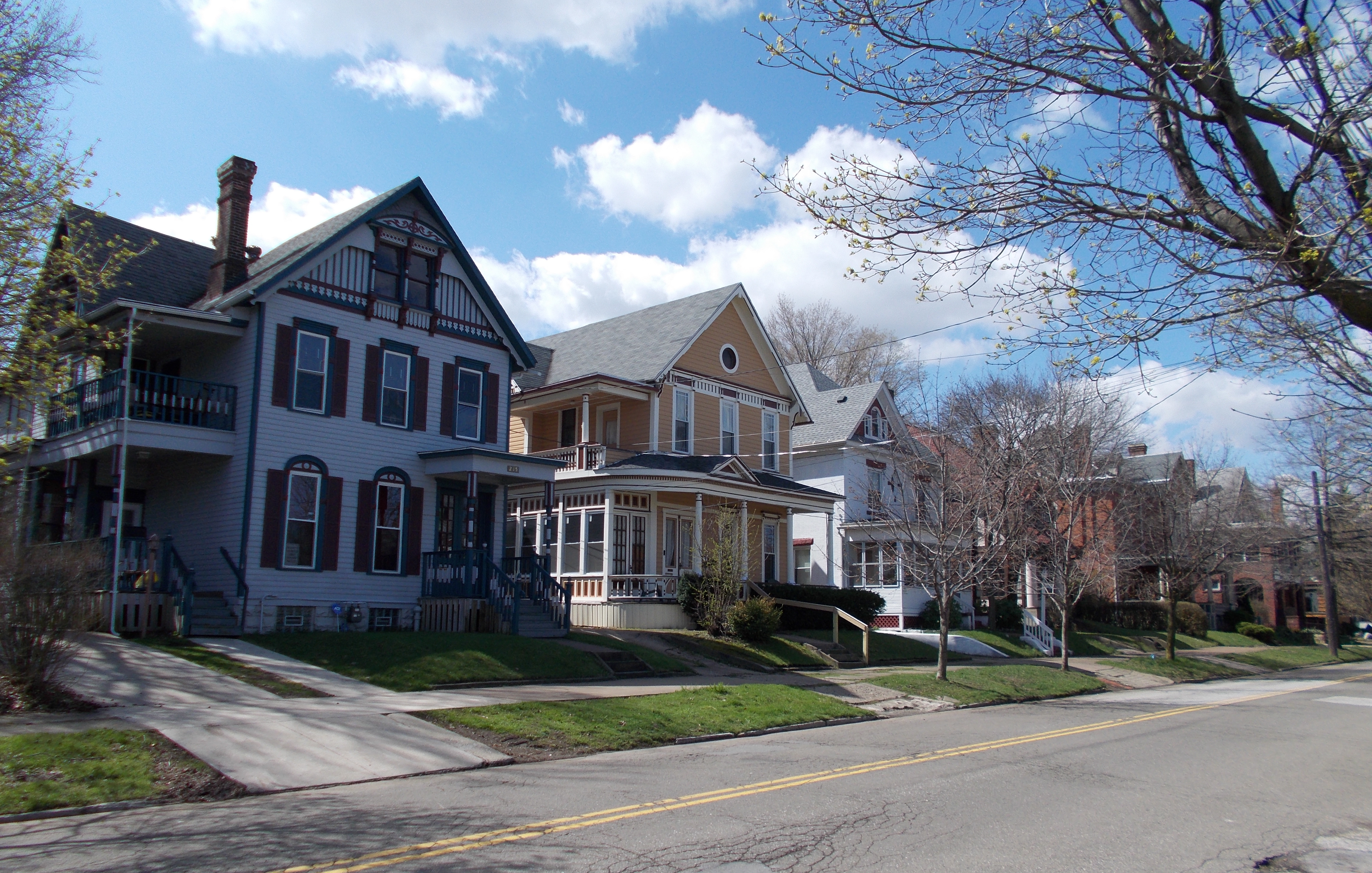
- West 21st Street Historic District, April 2013

- Location within Pennsylvania Location within the United States
- Location: 125-262 W. 21st St. and 2014-2125 Sassafras St., Erie, Pennsylvania
- Coordinates: 42°06′52″N 80°04′49″W
- Area: 12 acres (4.9 ha)
- Architect: Multiple
- Architectural style: Colonial Revival, Queen Anne, Italianate
- NRHP reference No.: 90000418
- Added to NRHP: March 9, 1990

West 21st Street Historic District is a national historic district located at Erie, Erie County, Pennsylvania. It includes 35 contributing middle and upper class residential buildings built between 1857 and 1939. They are in a variety of popular architectural styles including Queen Anne, Italianate, and Colonial Revival. Many of the buildings have been converted to multi-family use.

It was added to the National Register of Historic Places in 1990.

== Gallery ==
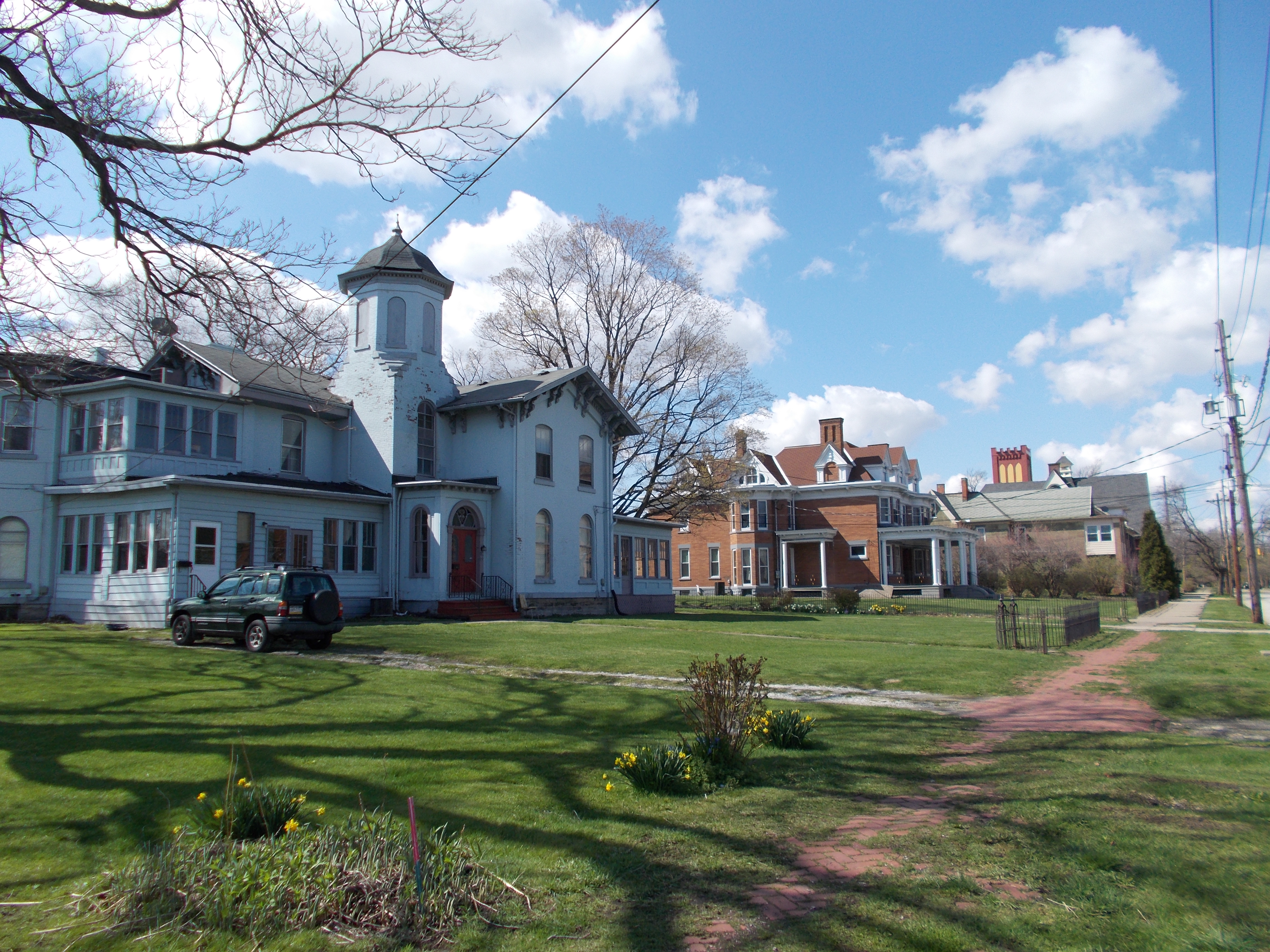
West 21st Street Historic District, April 2013
