= B. B. Vincent =

American politician

Bethuel Boyd Vincent (August 4, 1803 – July 21, 1876) was a businessman and politician in Erie County, Pennsylvania. He was the son of Judge John Vincent.

B. B. Vincent was elected the first clerk and treasurer of the recently established Waterford, Pennsylvania, in March 1834 and served as the last Burgess of Erie, Pennsylvania, in 1850, after which the city was incorporated and run by a mayor.

He was one of the organizers of the Erie County Mutual Fire Insurance Company, which was established in Erie on March 26, 1839.

He was a co-owner with William and David Himrod of Vincent, Himrod and Company, which operated an iron works on Mill Creek in Erie in 1840. The works later became the prominent Erie City Iron Works.

He was one of several managers of the Erie Canal Company when that entity was charged during the 1842–43 session of the Pennsylvania State Assembly to tend to certain affairs of the Erie Canal. (See Erie Canal#Enlargements and improvements)

He was among those selected by the city council in early 1846 to plant trees in the town square, which was called The Diamond at the time. An official ceremony was held in June 1846 to celebrate the plantings and to rename the park Perry Square.

He was among the first subscribers to the establishment of Erie Cemetery in October 1846.

He was President of the Marine National Bank from its establishment in Erie on March 9, 1865 until January 1867.

His son, Strong Vincent (June 17, 1837 – July 7, 1863), was a lawyer and civil war Union general who was mortally wounded at Little Round Top during the American Civil War Battle of Gettysburg. The boy's maternal grandfather, Captain Martin Strong (1770 - May 1823), was a pioneer, territorial surveyor, and prosperous land owner.
