= Joe Schember =

American banker and politician (born 1950)

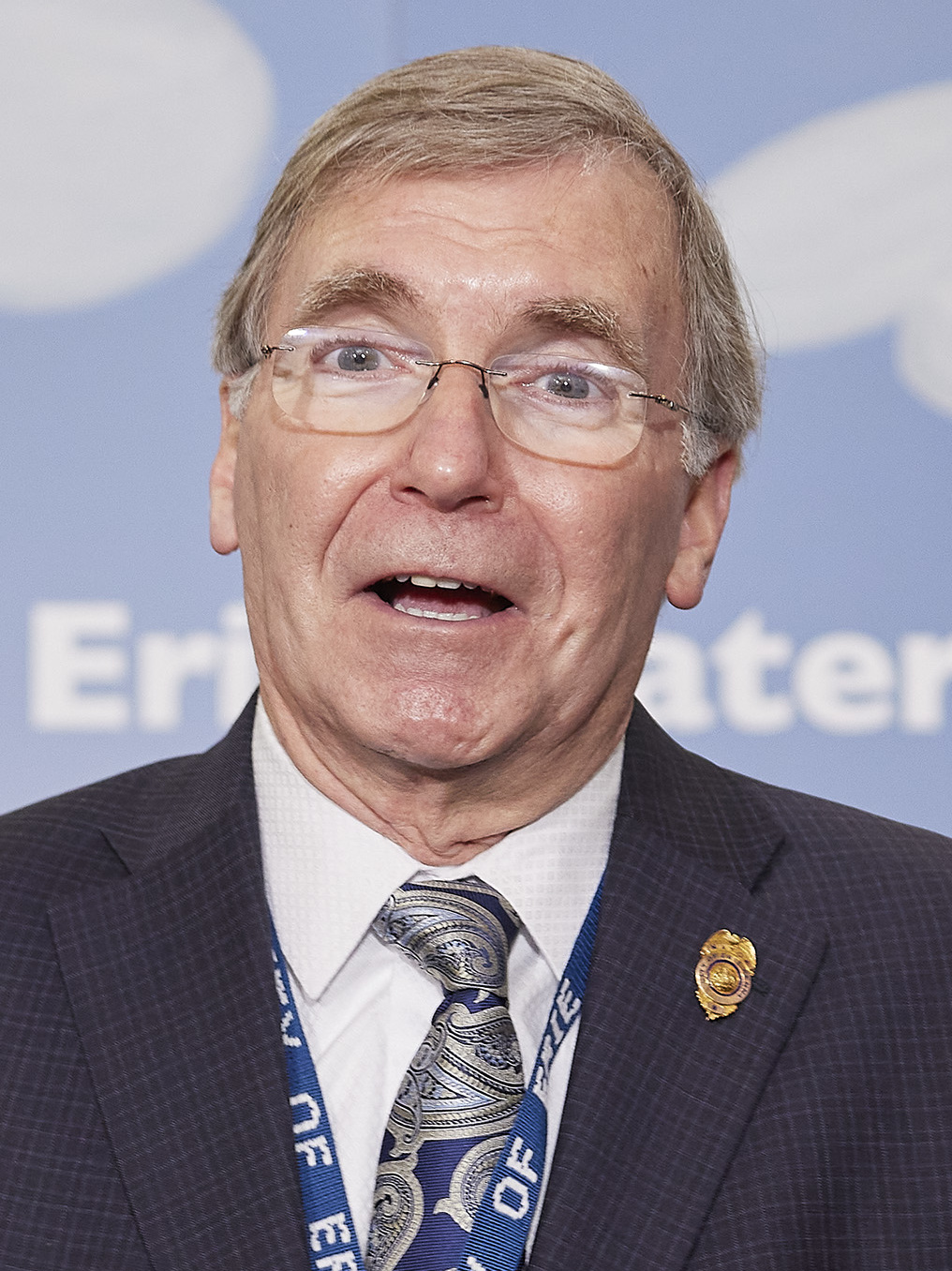

48th Mayor of Erie, Pennsylvania
- In office January 2, 2018 – January 5, 2026
- Preceded by: Joseph Sinnott
- Succeeded by: Daria Devlin

Personal details
- Born: November 13, 1950 (age 75)
- Party: Democratic
- Spouse: Rhonda Mahoney (m. 1979)
- Education: Gannon University (BA, MBA); University of Dayton (MA)
- Website: Office website Campaign website

Joseph Schember (born November 13, 1950) is an American banker and politician who served as the 48th mayor of Erie, Pennsylvania from 2018 to 2026. Schember previously served as a vice president of PNC Bank and as a member of the Erie City Council between 2006 and 2012.

On November 7, 2017, the people of Erie voted for the next Mayor and Schember won 53% of the vote to his Republican challenger John Persinger who gained 47% of the vote. The previous Mayor, Joseph E. Sinnott, served for three consecutive terms from 2006 to 2018 and ran unopposed in the latest election. Erie was at a decisive moment in its history as under Sinnott, Erie was kept out of Act 47 which is reserved for financially distressed cities.

== Early life and education ==
Joseph Schember was born on November 13, 1950, to the parents of Joseph and Helene Flatley Schember. He has two sisters, Mary Anne and Helene, a Rocket Scientist with a Ph.D. in Fluid Mechanics from Cal Tech. In his youth, he attended Catholic School and studied to become a Priest. He left seminary to complete his degree at Gannon University where he met his wife, Rhonda Mahoney. Schember then received a Master's Degree in English at the University of Dayton and taught at Elk County Christian in St. Mary's, Pennsylvania.

== Career ==
He worked for PNC Bank for forty years, starting as a teller and rising up to the level of Regional Manager of 51 branches for PNC in Northwestern Pennsylvania.

=== Erie city council, 2006–2012 ===
Schember served on City Council for six years, and was appointed as chairman of the Finance Committee in 2007. During his tenure, he oversaw the city of Erie move from a bleak financial state of a $12.7 million deficit in the General Fund in late 2005 to a $5 million surplus by 2012. In 2009 and in 2010, the City Council appointed Schember to be president of the City Council.

During the Citizens To Be Heard segment of the City Council Meetings, a local activist named Randy Barnes, who was president of an environmental group called Keep Erie's Environment Protected (K.E.E.P.), would continually lodge a conflict of interest complaint against Schember because he had employment with PNC Bank which was doing business with the city of Erie. In response to Randy Barnes complaints that he would lodge at each City Council meeting, Schember resigned May 8, 2012 with a letter that stated that he was "troubled by the lack of civility and unprofessionalism that has infected the Citizens To Be Heard segment of City Council Meetings."

=== Erie mayoral election, 2017 ===
Out of nine candidates running in the primary race for mayor, two remained in the run-up to the election: Democrat Joe Schember and Republican John Persinger. Republican nominee John Persinger eventually garnering 47% of the popular vote. Persinger emphasized eliminating blight with a campaign promise of "1,000 in 1,000 Days" initiative to remove 1,000 blighted properties in his first 1,000 days in office. He emphasized the role of broken windows theory, and said that if Erie is to prosper, Erie would need to address blight quickly.

=== Mayor of Erie ===
Schember initiated many changes to the mayoral governance of Erie after being elected to office. He and his team helped to upgrade the technology of Erie, redesign the city of Erie's website, and hire a new digital media coordinator to focus on modernizing the city with social media which under Sinnott's long mayoralty it lagged behind. Schember hired Erie's first full-time grant writer, Abby Skinner, to work on helping Erie access grant funding from the local, state and federal level. One of Schember's priorities was Erie Refocused, which is part of Erie's Comprehensive Plan to improve the city's economy and society.

=== Erie mayoral election, 2025 ===
Despite challengers from his own party, Schember won reelection in 2021 with 74% of the votes. However, in 2025 he was again faced with Democratic challengers in the 2025 primary and was not chosen to run for a third term. He was succeeded by Democratic candidate Daria Devlin, a 47-year-old administrator with the Hamot Health Foundation, who was sworn in on January 5, 2026.
