= List of mayors of Erie, Pennsylvania =

Mayor of Erie
- Seal of the City of Erie

- Incumbent; Daria Devlin since January 5, 2026
- Term length: 4 years (max. 3 consecutive terms)
- Inaugural holder: Thomas G. Colt
- Formation: April 14, 1851
- Salary: $120,000
- Website: Office of the Mayor

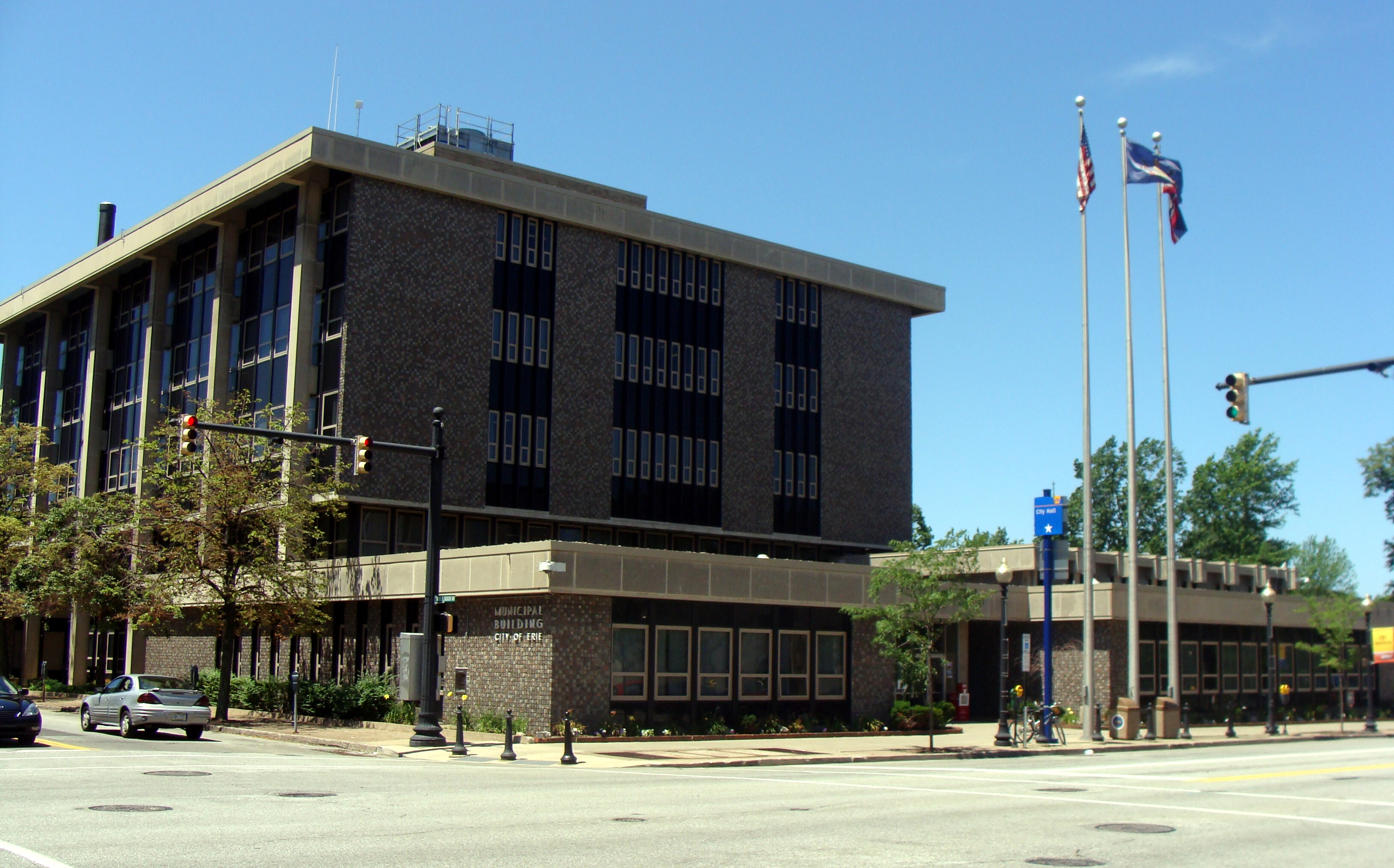
Erie City Hall houses the mayor's office.

This is a list of the people who have served as mayor of the city of Erie, Erie County, in northwestern Pennsylvania.

Erie's city government consists of a mayor and a city council. The mayor's office includes an elected city treasurer and city controller. The mayor also served as the President of the Select Council for the first nine years of Erie's incorporation.

A mayor was limited to only one term of two years until 1890, when it was then lengthened to three years during the second term of Charles S. Clarke. After 1890, mayors were an unlimited number of terms. The most notable example of the unlimited number of terms was Mayor Louis J. Tullio who was in office for eight consecutive terms from 1966 to 1989.

| # | Name | Term | Party | Notes |
|---|---|---|---|---|
| 49 | Daria Devlin | January 5, 2026–present | Democratic | Incumbent |
| 48 | Joseph Schember | January 2, 2018–January 5, 2026 | Democratic | |
| 47 | Joseph E. Sinnott | January 2, 2006–January 2, 2018 | Democratic | |
| 46 | Richard E. Filippi | 2002–2006 | Democratic | |
| 45 | Joyce A. Savocchio | 1990–2002 | Democratic | |
| * | Patricia Liebel | November 12, 1989–1990 | Democratic | Served as Acting mayor |
| 44 | Louis J. Tullio | 1966–November 12, 1989 | Democratic | Unable to complete term |
| 43 | Charles B. Williamson | 1962–1965 | Republican | |
| 42 | Arthur J. Gardner | 1955–1962 | Democratic | Appointed mayor after Flatley was removed from office |
| * | George J. Brabender | December 14, 1954–January 5, 1955 | | Served as Acting Mayor |
| 41 | Thomas W. Flatley | 1952–1954 | Democratic | Removed from office |
| 40 | Clairence K. Pulling | 1950–1952 | Republican | |
| 39 | Joseph C. Martin | 1948–1949 | | Replaced Hickey, who died of a heart attack |
| 38 | Sherman T. Hickey, Jr. | 1948–August 28, 1948 | Democratic | Died in office |
| 37 | Gale H. Ross | 1947–1948 | | Appointed for remainder of Barber's unexpired term |
| 36 | Charles R. Barber | 1936–1947 | Republican | Appointed State Secretary of Welfare in 1947 |
| 35 | James Patrick Rossiter | 1932–1936 | Democratic | |
| 34 | Joseph Crane Williams | 1924–1932 | | |
| 33 | Miles Brown Kitts | 1916–1924 | Republican | |
| 32 | Bernard J. Veit | 1915 | | Died before taking office |
| 31 | William J. Stern | 1911–1915 | Democratic | |
| 30 | Bernard Cochran | 1910–1910 | | |
| 29 | Michael Liebel Jr. | 1908–1911 | Democratic | |
| * | Michael Liebel Jr. | 1906–1907 | Democratic | Appointed in September 1906 then elected in February 1907 to complete Saltsman's unexpired term |
| 28 | Robert J. Saltsman | 1905–1906 | Democratic | Died in office |
| 27 | William Hardwick | 1902–1904 | | |
| 26 | John Depinet | 1900–1901 | Republican | |
| 25 | Robert J. Saltsman | 1896-04-06–1899 | Democratic | |
| 24 | Walter Scott | 1893–1896 | | |
| 23 | Charles S. Clarke | 1890–1893 | | |
Term length extended to 3 years in 1890
| 23 | Charles S. Clarke | 1889–1893 | | |
| 22 | John C. Brady | February 1887–1889 | Democratic | |
| 21 | Frank A. Mizener | 1886–1887 | | Appointed for remainder of Adams' unexpired term |
| 20 | Franklin Farrar Adams | 1885–1886 | | Resigned |
| 19 | Philip August Becker | 1883–1885 | | |
| 18 | Joseph McCarter | 1881–1883 | | |
| 17 | David T. Jones | 1878–1881 | | |
| 16 | Selden Marvin | 1877–1878 | | |
| 15 | John W. Hammond | 1876–1877 | | |
| 14 | Henry Rawle | 1874–1876 | | |
| 13 | Charles Manning Reed | 1872–1874 | Republican | |
| 12 | William L. Scott | 1871–1872 | Democratic | |
| 11 | Orange Noble | 1867–1871 | | |
| 10 | William L. Scott | 1866–1867 | Democratic | |
| 9 | Fernando Freeman Farrar | 1865–1866 | | |
| 8 | Prescott Metcalf | 1862 – 1865 | Republican | |
| 7 | Sherburn Smith | 1859–1862 | | |
| 6 | Wilson Laird | 1858–1859 | | |
| 5 | James Hoskinson | 1857–1858 | | |
| 4 | Wilson Laird | 1855–1857 | | |
| 3 | Alfred King | 1853–1855 | | |
| 2 | Murray Whallon | 1852–1853 | | |
| 1 | Thomas G. Colt | 1851–1852 | | First mayor of Erie |

== Burgesses ==
From 1805 until 1850, the Borough of Erie was headed by a burgess. The title of mayor has been used since the City of Erie was incorporated on April 14, 1851.

| Name | Starting Year | Ending Year | Date of birth | Date of death |
|---|---|---|---|---|
| B. B. Vincent | 1850 | 1850 | August 4, 1803 | July 21, 1876 |
| Alexander W. Brewster | 1849 | 1849 | 1795 | May 26, 1851 |
| Charles W. Kelso | 1848 | 1848 | | |
| William Kelley | 1846 | 1847 | | |
| Charles W. Kelso | 1845 | 1845 | | |
| Thomas H. Sill | 1843 | 1844 | October 11, 1783 | February 7, 1856 |
| Thomas Stewart | 1842 | 1842 | | |
| Rufus S. Reed | 1841 | 1841 | October 11, 1775 | June 1, 1846 |
| Myron Goodwin | 1840 | 1840 | | |
| William Kelley | 1839 | 1839 | | |
| James L. White | 1838 | 1838 | | |
| J. B. Laughead | 1836 | 1837 | | |
| Joseph M. Sterrett | 1834 | 1835 | | |
| Thomas H. Sill | 1833 | 1833 | October 11, 1783 | February 7, 1856 |
| Tabor Beebe (acted for Forster) | 1832 | 1832 | | |
| Thomas Forster (elected but did not serve) | 1832 | 1832 | May 16, 1762 | 1836 |
| George A. Eliot | 1831 | 1831 | | |
| William Johns | 1830 | 1830 | | |
| Thomas H. Sill | 1829 | 1829 | October 11, 1783 | February 17, 1856 |
| Tabor Beebe | 1828 | 1828 | | |
| John C. Wallace | 1825 | 1827 | February 14, 1771 | December 8, 1827 |
| John Morris | 1822 | 1824 | | |
| Judah Colt | 1820 | 1821 | | |
| George Moore | 1818 | 1819 | | |
| Thomas H. Sill | 1816 | 1817 | October 11, 1783 | February 7, 1856 |
| George Moore | 1814 | 1815 | | |
| Judah Colt | 1813 | 1814 | | |
| Samuel Hays | 1812 | 1813 | | |
| John C. Wallace | 1810 | 1812 | February 14, 1771 | December 8, 1827 |
| George Buehler | 1808 | 1809 | | |
| Thomas Wilson | 1807 | 1807 | 1772 | October 4, 1824 |
| John C. Wallace | May 5, 1806 | 1806 | February 14, 1771 | December 8, 1827 |

== See also ==
- History of Erie, Pennsylvania

== Notes ==
- A mayor was inaugurated on the first Monday of April 1896. Mayors were inaugurated on the first Monday of January 1916 and January 1924, with elections having been held the previous November.
- At least two mayors died in office: Robert J. Saltsman (1906) and Sherman Hickey, Jr. (1948). One mayor-elect, Bernard Veit, died soon after his election in November 1915, before he could be inaugurated.
- Thomas W. Flatley was removed from office in 1954 in a gambling and bribery scandal. George J. Brabender served as acting mayor for less than a month, from December 14, 1954 until January 5, 1955, to fill Flatley's unexpired term.
- Franklin F. Adams resigned in 1885. Frank A. Mizener completed his unexpired term.
- Bernard Cochran served as acting mayor from March to May 1910, covering the absence of Michael Liebel, Jr.
- The Abraham Lincoln funeral train stopped in Erie with Mayor F. F. Farrar aboard. Mr. Lincoln made a pre-inaugural rail trip through nearby Girard, Pennsylvania on his way to Washington, D.C. from Illinois.
- Ralph W. Tilloston, twice the Socialist candidate for mayor of Erie, was convicted in United States District Court on March 20, 1919 of violation of the Espionage Act.
- Mario S. Bagnoni (April 2, 1922 – August 5, 2005) was named honorary Mayor of Erie for a day in June 2005. He served eight terms (32 years) on the Erie City Council and was five times elected president of the council. The Mario S. Bagnoni Council Chambers, located in Erie City Hall, were posthumously named in his honor in September 2005. He made two attempts to become Erie mayor. He retired in 1971 as deputy chief of detectives for the Erie Police Department, which he had served since it was the Erie Bureau of Police in 1949. He is interred at Gate of Heaven Cemetery in Fairview, Pennsylvania.

== Bibliography ==
- Bates, Samuel P (1884). History of Erie County, Pennsylvania. Vol. 1. Chicago: Warner, Beer's and Company.
- Bates, Samuel P (1884). History of Erie County, Pennsylvania. Vol. 2. Chicago: Warner, Beer's and Company.
- Miller, John (1909). A Twentieth Century History of Erie County, Pennsylvania. Vol. 1. Chicago: Lewis Publishing.
- Miller, John (1909). A Twentieth Century History of Erie County, Pennsylvania. Vol. 2. Chicago: Lewis Publishing.
