= Robert M. Johnston =

Robert M. Johnston may refer to:

- Robert Mackenzie Johnston (1844–1918), Scottish-Australian statistician
- Robert Matteson Johnston (1867–1920), American historian
- Robert Mercer Johnston (born 1908), a Canadian politician
- Robert M. Johnston, co-author of "Elements of Applied Thermodynamics" with William A. Brockett
