= Robert C. Gooding =

United States Navy admiral (1918–1999)

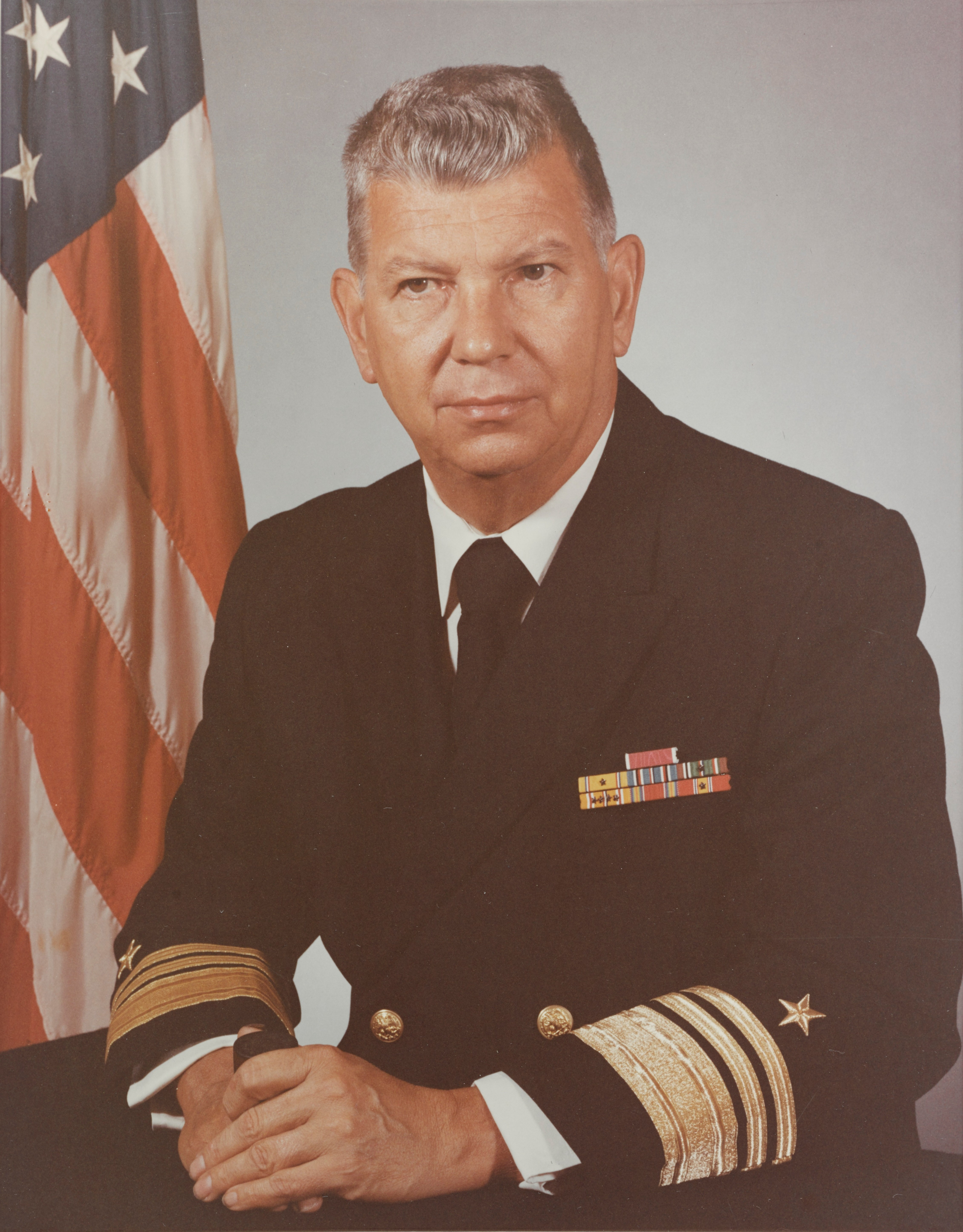
- Born: June 27, 1918; New Orleans, Louisiana
- Died: November 30, 1999 (aged 81); Falls Church, Virginia
- Military career
- Allegiance: United States
- Branch: United States Navy
- Service years: 1941–1976
- Rank: Vice Admiral
- Commands: Naval Sea Systems Command; Naval Ship Systems Command; Boston Naval Shipyard
- Conflicts: World War II; Cold War
- Awards: Distinguished Service Medal; Legion of Merit

Robert Carpenter Gooding (June 27, 1918 – November 30, 1999) was a Vice Admiral in the United States Navy. He became an engineering duty officer after service at sea during World War II, eventually becoming the first commanding officer of Naval Sea Systems Command from 1974 to 1976.

== Biography ==
Gooding was born in New Orleans, Louisiana. He attended high school in both Pittsburgh, Pennsylvania and Alexandria, Virginia.

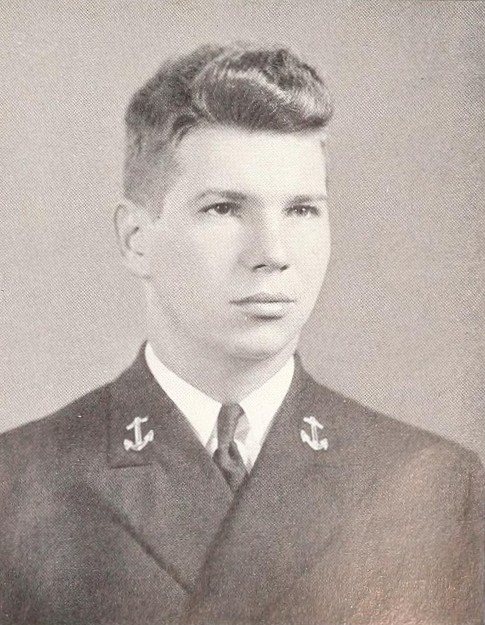
Gooding as a Naval Academy midshipman

In 1938, Gooding was appointed to the United States Naval Academy from Virginia. Because of World War II, he received his B.S. degree with the Class of 1942 on December 19, 1941. After serving aboard the battleship Washington until July 1944, Gooding was sent to the Massachusetts Institute of Technology for further education. In 1946, he completed an M.S. degree in naval architecture and marine engineering. Gooding was promoted to lieutenant commander on October 3, 1945.

From 1946 to 1949, Gooding worked at the Charleston Naval Shipyard as an engineering duty officer. From 1949 to 1955, he was assigned to the Bureau of Ships, where he became an expert on underwater explosions. Gooding was promoted to commander on March 1, 1954. From 1955 to 1957, he was maintenance and logistics officer on the staff of Commander Mine Force, United States Pacific Fleet. From August 1957 to July 1958, Gooding was technical director for two underwater atomic test explosions during Operation Hardtack at Eniwetok Atoll.

From 1958 to 1962, Gooding served as shipbuilding and repair superintendent at the New York Naval Shipyard. He was promoted to captain on July 1, 1960. From 1962 to 1968, Gooding was assigned to the Special Projects Office supporting the Polaris and Poseidon submarine-launched nuclear ballistic missile systems. Appointed deputy technical director in September 1964, he became technical director in February 1965.

On August 30, 1968, Gooding assumed command of the Boston Naval Shipyard. On September 12, 1969, he was promoted to rear admiral. On October 20, 1969, Gooding became vice commander of the Naval Ship Systems Command. On August 2, 1972, Gooding assumed command of the Naval Ship Systems Command, relieving RADM Nathan Sonenshein. This command continued through the transition of Naval Ship Systems Command to Naval Sea Systems Command. On September 19, 1973, he was promoted to vice admiral.

On December 3, 1968, Gooding was awarded the Legion of Merit for his service as technical director of the Special Projects Office. He received the Navy Distinguished Service Medal upon his retirement in September 1976.

In 1976, he was elected to the National Academy of Engineering.

Gooding died from liver cancer at a hospice in Falls Church, Virginia on November 30, 1999. He was interred at Arlington National Cemetery.
