= Forbeck =

Forbeck is a surname. Notable people with the surname include:

- Andrew P. Forbeck (1881–1924), United States Navy sailor
- Matt Forbeck (born 1968), American writer and role-playing game designer
