= Charles A. Curtze =

United States Navy admiral (1911–2007)

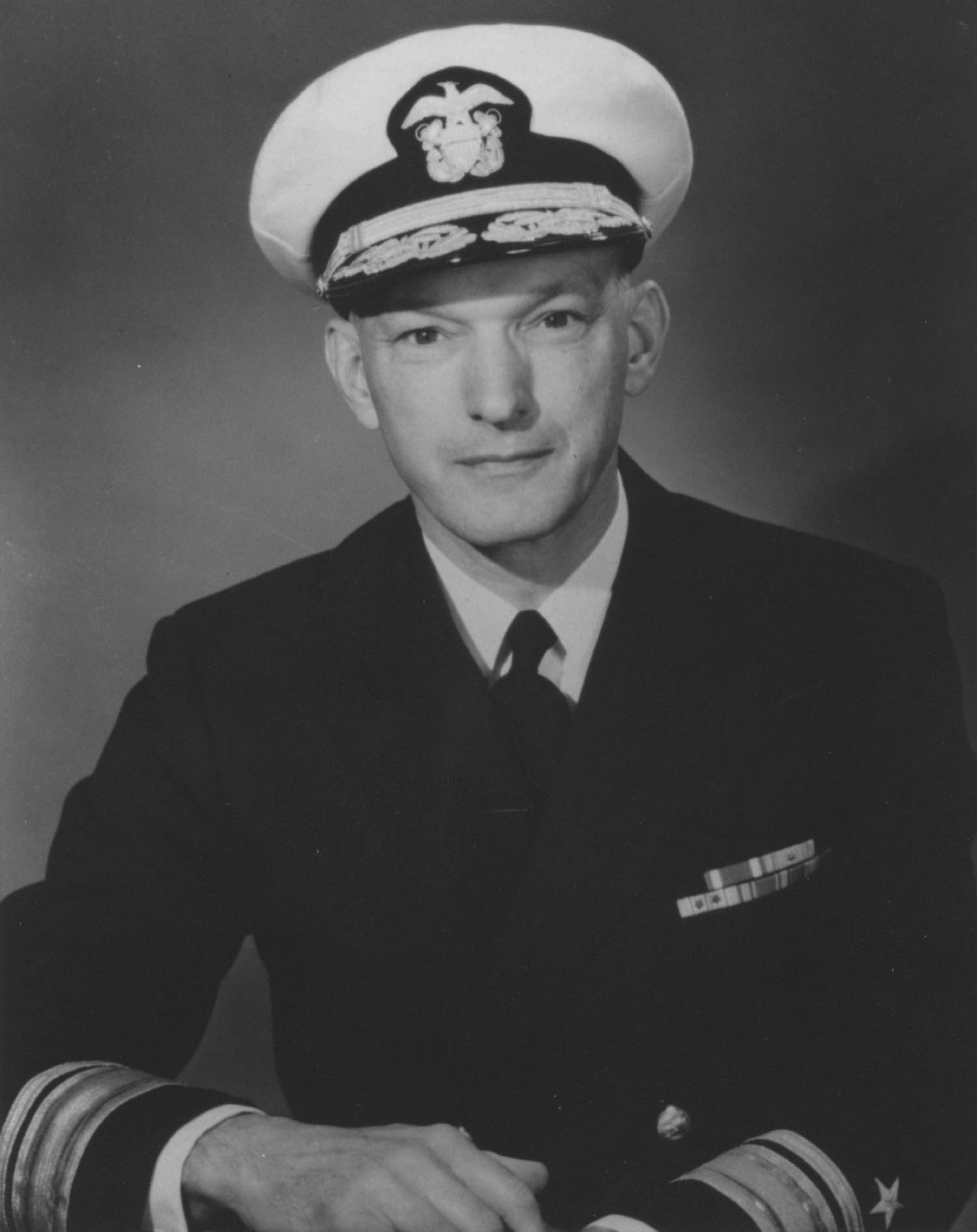
- Born: April 8, 1911; Erie, Pennsylvania, United States
- Died: December 26, 2007 (aged 96); Millcreek Township, Pennsylvania, United States
- Military career
- Allegiance: United States of America
- Branch: United States Navy
- Service years: 1933–1965
- Rank: Rear Admiral
- Commands: San Francisco Naval Shipyard
- Conflicts: World War II: Attack on Pearl Harbor

Charles August Curtze (April 8, 1911 – December 26, 2007) was a rear admiral in the United States Navy. He was born in Erie, Pennsylvania and died at age 96 in Millcreek Township, Pennsylvania. He served as Deputy Chief of the Navy's Bureau of Ships during the Vietnam War. He is buried at the Erie Cemetery.

== Education ==
Born and raised in Erie, Pennsylvania, Curtze graduated from Central High School in 1928. He participated in a Rotary Club student exchange to Scandinavia, which led to his appointment to the United States Naval Academy.

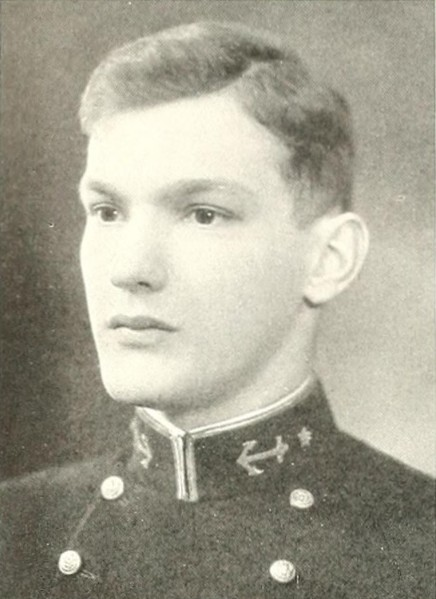
Curtze as a Naval Academy midshipman

Curtze was a star gymnast while attending the Naval Academy, winning second place in 1931 in the Eastern Intercollegiate Gymnastics League and leading the midshipmen to the league's championship in 1933. When he qualified for the US gymnastics team attending the 1936 Summer Olympics. The US Navy prohibited his completing in the Olympics Berlin, Germany during Adolf Hitler's rule. Adm. Curtze also qualified for the 1940 Olympics in Tokyo, Japan, which was cancelled because of World War II.

Curtze graduated from the Naval Academy with a Bachelor of Science degree in 1933. He received his Master of Science degree in Naval Construction from the Massachusetts Institute of Technology in 1938. Curtze also attended the Naval Postgraduate School.

== Career ==
Curtze was serving as a fleet safety officer aboard the cruiser USS St. Louis at the time of the attack on Pearl Harbor on December 7, 1941. He helped guide the ship safely out of harbor, making it one of the few major ships to escape the Japanese bombings. He served with the North Atlantic Treaty Organization (NATO) as the engineering member of the first US team in London. He also served as commander of the San Francisco Naval Shipyard.

Curtze was promoted to rear admiral effective June 1, 1961. His final assignment was as Deputy Chief of the Bureau of Ships. Curtze and his commanding officer, Rear Admiral William A. Brockett, submitted their resignations and requested early retirement in October 1965 to protest Secretary of Defense Robert S. McNamara's centralization of the U.S. Department of Defense. After Rear Admiral John J. Fee succeeded him as deputy chief of the bureau, Curtze retired from active duty in December 1965.
