= Mumma =

Mumma may refer to:

== People ==
- Gordon Mumma (b. 1935), American composer
- Kar de Mumma, Swedish theatre producer
- Lt. Commander Morton C. Mumma, commander of the USS Sailfish (SS-192) in 1940
- Walter M. Mumma (1890–1961), US Congressman from Pennsylvania

== Science ==
- 8340 Mumma, an asteroid discovered by Edward L. G. Bowell
