= Ralph James =

Ralph James may refer to:

- Ralph James (actor) (1924–1992), American voice and character actor
- Ralph James (coach) (1902–1981), American football and basketball coach
- Ralph A. James (1920–1973), American chemist
- Ralph Duncan James (1909–1979), Canadian mathematician
- Ralph K. James (1906–1994), United States Navy admiral
