= Albert G. Mumma =

United States Navy admiral (1906–1997)

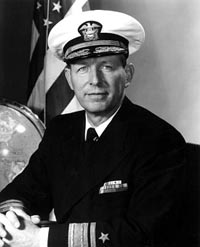
- Rear Admiral Albert G. Mumma
- Born: 2 June 1906; Findlay, Ohio
- Died: 15 July 1997 (aged 91); Gladwyne, Pennsylvania
- Burial place: United States Naval Academy Cemetery, Annapolis, Maryland
- Relatives: Morton C. Mumma (brother)
- Military career
- Allegiance: United States of America
- Branch: United States Navy
- Service years: 1926–1959
- Rank: Rear Admiral
- Commands: Bureau of Ships; Mare Island Naval Shipyard; David Taylor Model Basin
- Conflicts: World War II: Allied Invasion of France; Allied Invasion of Germany
- Awards: Commendation Ribbon; Grand Officer of the Order of Orange-Nassau (Netherlands)

Signature
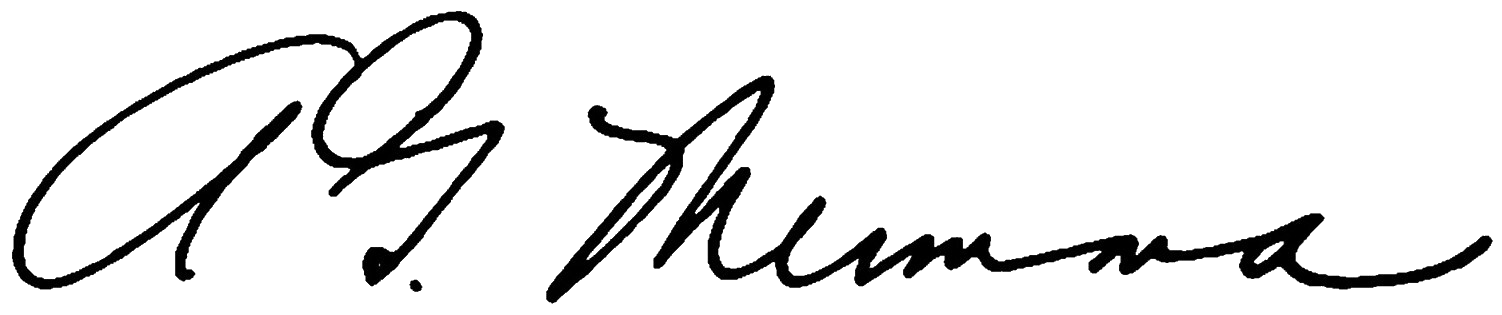

Albert Girard Mumma (2 June 1906 – 15 July 1997) was a rear admiral in the United States Navy who played a pivotal role in the development of nuclear propulsion for warships. During World War II, he served in France and Germany with the Alsos Mission.

A 1926 graduate of the United States Naval Academy, Mumma served on a number of warships. He studied marine engineering at the L'École Nationale Supérieure de Maritime in Paris, where he learned the latest techniques of maritime construction. During World War II he served at the David Taylor Model Basin, where he investigated problems of propeller design. In January 1943, he took over the Propeller desk at the Bureau of Ships. He joined the Alsos Mission in 1944, and in the last days of the war was part of a 75-man task force that captured the city of Kiel, including the whole garrison of 150,000 men.

After the war he returned to the Bureau of Ships, where he was involved with the development of nuclear propulsion. Mumma was promoted to rear admiral in 1954, and assumed command of the Mare Island Naval Shipyard. He became responsible for celebrating its 100th anniversary. However, his most important task was converting the shipyard over to the construction of nuclear submarines. In 1955 he became chief of the Bureau of Ships, where he championed the adoption of the teardrop hull, and oversaw the design of nuclear submarines, cruisers and aircraft carriers.

== Early life ==
Albert Girard Mumma was born in Findlay, Ohio, on 2 June 1906. His father was a U.S. Army officer, Morton C. Mumma, who had graduated from the United States Military Academy at West Point with the class of 1900. He would eventually retire with the rank of lieutenant colonel in 1928, and be advanced to colonel on the retired list in 1930. The family lived on a series of Army posts in the United States and overseas. After going on board the destroyer USS Barry in the Philippines when he was nine years old, Mumma decided to become a naval officer. He graduated from Iowa City High School in 1922.

Albert entered the United States Naval Academy at Annapolis, Maryland, in July 1922 with an appointment from Iowa Congressman Harry E. Hull. His two brothers also graduated from Annapolis. His older brother, Morton C. Mumma, Jr., graduated with the class of 1925, served with submarines and PT boats during World War II, and eventually rose to the rank of rear admiral. His younger brother George graduated with the class of 1934, but resigned later that year, and later became a major in the army during World War II. In addition, his nephew, Morton C. Mumma III, graduated with the class of 1948, and joined the air force, from which he retired as a colonel in 1978.

Mumma's class at Annapolis was the first for which the traditional midshipmen's cruises were replaced with aviator training for half the class, but Mumma was in the half that still went on the cruises. He sailed to Europe on the battleships USS Arkansas and USS Wyoming, and sailed from Annapolis to Bremerton, Washington, and back in the battleship USS New York. He undertook aviation training immediately after graduation. He graduated 18th out of 456 in the class of 1926, and received an award for having the highest standing in engineering and aeronautics. He was commissioned as an ensign on graduation on 3 June 1926, and after he finished his aviation training, he reported to the cruiser USS Richmond. This took him down to Guantánamo Bay, where he joined the crew of the cruiser USS Seattle. Returning to Iowa City for Thanksgiving, he had a blind date with Carmen Braley, whom he took to the Army–Navy Game in Chicago. They became engaged in July 1925, and were married on 1 October 1927. They had three sons: Albert Girard Mumma, Jr., John Stanton Mumma and David Braley Mumma.

His next assignment was to the aircraft carrier USS Saratoga, which was being fitted out. He was sent for flight training, but washed out due to having less than perfect eyesight. He was promoted to the rank of lieutenant (junior grade) on 3 June 1929. After four years with Saratoga, he was assigned to the destroyer USS Waters as its gunnery officer. He left the Waters in 1932 to attend the Naval Postgraduate School, which was then located at Annapolis. In 1934, he was offered an opportunity to complete his studies in Paris, although he had not studied French at the Academy. He enrolled in French at the University of Nancy in July. Immersing in the language, Mumma and his family spoke French only. He studied marine engineering at the L'École Nationale Supérieure de Maritime in Paris. Instead of just becoming a maritime engineer, he learned the latest techniques of maritime construction. Before leaving Europe, he was informed that he had been selected for promotion to lieutenant, but he still had to pass the examinations. He reported to his next ship, which was the cruiser USS Chicago, as assistant engineer, at Long Beach, California, where he took his examinations, and was promoted on 29 June 1936. After less than a year, he was sent to the new destroyer USS Clark on the request of its skipper, Commander Hewlett Thebaud.

== World War II ==
In 1939, Mumma was posted to the David Taylor Model Basin, where he was promoted to lieutenant commander on 26 June 1940 and commander on 15 August 1942. There he conducted research into the design of propellers and drive shafts. He examined a problem with the skegs on the keels of the North Carolina and South Dakota-class battleships with harmonic vibrations, which was resolved with re-designed propellers. Similar problems with "singing" propellers affected the Casablanca-class escort carriers. In January 1943, he took over the Propeller desk at the Bureau of Ships, with the rank of captain from 1 August 1943. Propeller design was a critical part of all ships, and special propellers were designed and tested for PT boats and submarines. In early 1944, he visited Britain to look at problems with vibration in the new Implacable-class aircraft carriers. Once again, the solution lay in propeller design.

On returning to the United States, he met with Major General Leslie R. Groves, Jr., the director of the Manhattan Project. Mumma became one of four naval officers assigned to the Alsos Mission, the others being Jacob Pieter Den Hartog, Wendell P. Roop and Henry A. "Packy" Schade. The naval section of Alsos would investigate German naval technologies, but the main objective of the Alsos Mission was to learn all it could about the German nuclear energy project. All members of the mission had ultra secret security clearances, but none had been involved with the development of the atomic bomb.

The naval section of Alsos flew into Paris soon after it had been liberated in August 1944. They went down to Bordeaux to inspect the captured German destroyer Z39. After the Alsos Mission became convinced that the Germans had not developed an atomic bomb, the naval section became the Naval Technical Mission Europe under the leadership of Commodore Schade, growing to a staff of almost 900 Navy personnel and civilians by the end of September 1945. They were particularly interested in the work of Dr. Hellmuth Walter in the development of submarines and rockets. Most of the targets that they were interested in lay in the British sector, so they worked closely with their English allies. In the last days of the war, the Naval Technical Mission was part of a 75-man task force, most of whom were from 30 Assault Unit, that made a dash for Kiel, entering the city far in advance of the Allied advance. The whole garrison of the city, some 150,000 men, surrendered to the task force. They drove to Admiral Karl Dönitz's headquarters in Flensburg, where they saw but did not speak with him, as Dönitz was on his way to surrender. They spoke instead to Admiral Otto Backenköhler, and persuaded him to sign a release for German scientists, so men like Walter could freely discuss their work with the Allies. From April to December 1945, Mumma also served as assistant naval attaché.

== Post war ==
Mumma arrived back in the United States in December 1945, and returned to the Bureau of Ships. The Bureau's immediate post war priority was to develop nuclear propulsion for ships. With the Chief of the Bureau, Rear Admiral Earle W. Mills, and Captain Paul F. Lee, he went to see Groves and Brigadier General Kenneth Nichols, the commander of the Manhattan District, who were willing to help, but would not offer any fissionable material. The Navy decided to proceed with the design of a nuclear-powered ship. They visited Oak Ridge, and attended lectures of nuclear physics from George Gamow and Lawrence R. Hafstad. Mumma selected four outstanding young officers and a physicist, Everett Blizzard, to go to Oak Ridge and learn about reactor design. Mills decided that a senior officer should be sent as well, and added Hyman Rickover to the group, something that Mumma warned Mills that he would regret.

In 1949, Mumma became production officer at the San Francisco Naval Shipyard. With the outbreak of the Korean War in 1950, the shipyard became very busy, as ships such as the Iowa-class battleships were retrieved from being laid up, refurbished and recommissioned. In 1951, he became commander of the David Taylor Model basin. He supervised the conversion of the submarine USS Albacore to incorporate a teardrop hull, and successfully pressed for a single-screw design against entrenched prejudice.

Mumma was promoted to rear admiral in 1954, and assumed command of the Mare Island Naval Shipyard. He became responsible for celebrating the 100th anniversary of its founding by David Farragut in 1854. However, his most important task was converting the shipyard over to the construction of nuclear submarines. This involved extensive retraining of the shipyard's personnel. His tour of command was a short one, for in 1955 he became chief of the Bureau of Ships. Disappointed with the performance of the USS Nautilus and the Skate-class submarines, he pushed for the adoption of the single screw and teardrop hull. The result was the Skipjack-class submarine. The George Washington-class submarines that followed were a development of the Skipjack with Polaris missiles. He also oversaw the design of the USS Enterprise, the first nuclear-powered aircraft carrier, and its escorts USS Long Beach and USS Bainbridge.

== Later life ==
Mumma retired from the navy in 1959 and took a job as vice president of engineering at Worthington Corporation. He was elected to the board of directors in 1962, and became executive vice president in 1964, president in April 1967, and chairman of the board in November 1967. He retired at the age of 65 in July 1971. That year President Richard Nixon appointed him to head the American Shipbuilding Commission, which was charged with reporting on ways of improving shipbuilding in the United States. In retirement, he held a number of directorships, on the boards of companies including Prudential Insurance, New Jersey Manufacturers Insurance, the First State Bank, United Hospitals of Newark, Coyful and Esser, C. R. Bard, the Newark Chamber of Commerce, and the New Jersey Chamber of Commerce. He was a member of the National Research Council, and served as president of the American Society of Naval Engineers and the Society of Naval Architects and Marine Engineers, which awarded him its Admiral Jerry Land Gold Medal, and was a trustee of the Webb Institute of Naval Architecture, Drew University and Saint Barnabas Hospital. He was awarded an honorary Doctor of Engineering degree by the Newark College of Engineering, and was created a Grand Officer of the Order of Orange-Nassau by the Queen of the Netherlands.

He died in Gladwyne, Pennsylvania, on 15 July 1997, and was interred at the United States Naval Academy Cemetery.
