= Prescott Metcalf =

American politician

8th Mayor of Erie, Pennsylvania
- In office 1862–1864
- Preceded by: Sherburn Smith
- Succeeded by: F. F. Farrar

Personal details
- Born: January 25, 1813; Putney, Vermont
- Died: October 14, 1891 (aged 78); Erie, Pennsylvania
- Political party: Republican
- Spouse: Abigail R. Wilder
- Children: 5

Prescott Metcalf (January 25, 1813 – October 14, 1891) was a prominent businessman and the 8th mayor of Erie, Pennsylvania. He was one of the first Republican mayors of Erie, Pennsylvania, a post he held from 1862 to 1864.

His children were Joseph P. Metcalf, (1847–1901); Windham Wilder Metcalf, (1847–1851); Frederick Wilder Metcalf, (d. 1890); Nellie Metcalf, (d. 1856); and George Ralph Metcalf, (1858–1931).

One of thirteen children, Metcalf was born in Putney, Vermont. He arrived in Erie in 1835.

Mecalf's father was Joseph Metcalf (24 August 1774 in Oakham, MA – 27 January 1869 in Putney, VT) and his grandfather was Sgt. Samuel Metcalf (26 April 1739 in Rutland, MA – 13 June 1785, Oakham, MA) a Continental soldier

== Business exploits ==
Metcalf was well known for his role as a lake traffic manager for the steamship businesses owned by Rufus S. Reed and Charles Manning Reed, with whom he became acquainted in 1840. The three were involved in the development and operation of the Erie Extension Canal. Metcalf held the title of director of the canal at one time and owned a fleet of canal boats labeled the P. M. Line, nicknamed by locals as the Poor Man's Line. He pioneered the establishment of the Erie and Pittsburgh and Erie and North East railroads. He also helped to incorporate several manufacturing firms in Erie, including the Erie Gas Works and the Erie Malleable Iron Works. Metcalf was also able to get the Burdett Organ Company to relocate to Erie by building them a plant in 90 days and employing 120 persons. Metcalf developed commercial properties in central downtown Erie. Metcalf was on the board of the Park Presbyterian Church and the Erie Cemetery (which he had helped incorporate). By 1860, Metcalf was a wealthy coal merchant and owned $43,000 worth of property ($981,000 in today's money). Metcalf served as mayor of Erie from 1862 to 1864 and held no other political office after his term ended. He was initially a member of the Whig Party, but switched to the Republican Party.

== Death ==
Metcalf died in Erie on 14 October 1891. He is buried in Erie Cemetery, 2116 Chestnut Street, Erie County, Erie, Pennsylvania 16502.
