= Morton C. Mumma =

American Navy officer

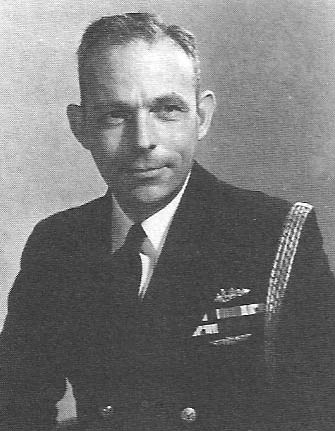
- Morton Claire Mumma, Jr.
- Born: 24 August 1904; Manila, Philippine Islands
- Died: 14 August 1968 (aged 63); Tucson, Arizona, U.S.
- Burial place: Arlington National Cemetery
- Relatives: Morton Claire Mumma (father): Albert G. Mumma (brother); Morton C. Mumma III (son); Morton C. Mumma IV (grandson)
- Military career
- Allegiance: United States
- Branch: United States Navy
- Service years: 1925–1946, 1951–1953
- Rank: Rear Admiral, USN
- Commands: USS S-43 (SS-154); USS Sailfish (SS-192); Task Group 50.1/70.1
- Conflicts: U.S. submarine campaign against the Japanese Empire; New Guinea campaign
- Awards: Navy Cross; Legion of Merit (2); Order of the British Empire
- Other work: Aide to James Forrestal; President of the NRA

Rear Admiral Morton Claire Mumma Jr. (24 August 1904 – 14 August 1968) was a senior officer in the United States Navy. He was awarded the Navy Cross for actions on 13 December 1941 while commanding USS Sailfish (SS-192) during World War II. He later served as naval aide to Secretary James Forrestal in 1944–45, and retired in 1946. Mumma was president of the National Rifle Association from 1955 to 1957, and at his death was on the association's executive council.

== Early life ==
Morton C. Mumma, Jr., was born on 24 August 1904 in Manila, Philippines. He was the eldest son of Colonel Morton C. Mumma, United States Army. He attended schools in Iowa City, Iowa. Appointed to the United States Naval Academy in 1921, he graduated in the class of 1925. Colonel Mumma was noted as "expert rifle shot," and he passed his skills to his son. Mumma, Jr., was captain of the academy rifle team, and coach of the academy rifle team twice, from 1928 to 1929, and from 1938 to 1940. Upon graduation, he joined the Navy service-wide rifle team.

Prior to attending submarine school at Groton, Connecticut in 1928, Mumma served in destroyers. One of his first commands was the submarine USS S-43 (SS-154) from 1935 until 1938. Originally based at Pearl Harbor, the submarine relocated to Coco Solo, in the Panama Canal Zone, in 1936.

== World War II ==
He was awarded the Navy Cross for actions on 13 December 1941 during World War II, while serving aboard USS Sailfish (SS-192), after making contact with two Japanese destroyers, and bravely began a submerged attack; the destroyers detected her, dropping a couple of depth charges, while Sailfish fired two torpedoes. Despite a large explosion nearby, no damage was done, and the destroyers counterattacked with 18–20 depth charges. The depth charging led Mumma to suffer a breakdown and he was relieved.

=== Navy Cross Citation ===
The President of the United States of America takes pleasure in presenting the Navy Cross to Lieutenant Commander Morton Claire Mumma, Jr., United States Navy, for extraordinary heroism in the line of his profession as Commanding Officer of the U.S.S. SAILFISH (SS-192), on the FIRST War Patrol of that submarine in enemy controlled waters of off Luzon, Philippine Islands. On the night of 13 December 1941, the ship made contact with a convoy escorted by three Japanese destroyers. Lieutenant Commander Mumma boldly maneuvered his submarine into striking position despite enemy depth charge counter measures and directed operations and fire to score a torpedo hit on an enemy destroyer. Through his experience and sound judgment Lieutenant Commander Mumma brought his ship safely back to port. His conduct throughout was an inspiration to his officers and men and in keeping with the highest traditions of the United States Naval Service.

=== Patrol boat service ===
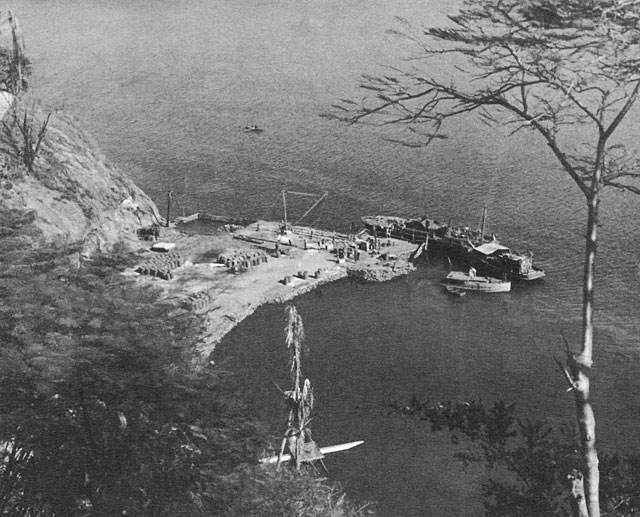
The PT boat jetty at Tufi.

Following duty with the Southwest Pacific submarine staff, and then as naval liaison to Fifth Air Force, on 5 February 1943 Mumma became Commander, Task Group 50.1, the PT boats in the Southwest Pacific. On 15 March, with the creation the US Seventh Fleet, Task Group 50.1 became Task Group 70.1, Motor Torpedo Boat Squadrons Seventh Fleet. Mumma "was responsible directly to, and only to, the Commander Seventh Fleet. Furthermore, from the start he had full operational control of his boats, and specific areas were assigned for PT operations. As a task group commander he received complete information as to the movements of other naval vessels." Mumma's headquarters were at Milne Bay, Papua New Guinea.

In early March 1943, Mumma's PT boats, leaving from Tufi, Papua New Guinea, took part in the Battle of the Bismarck Sea. Late 3 March, Mumma's boats sank the Oigawa Maru (6,493 tons). In April, Mumma moved his advance base from Tufi to Morobe, Papua New Guinea.

Nassau Bay, southeast of Salamaua, was captured at Mumma's suggestion that a supply base there would shorten the supply line to the 3rd Australian Division. Mumma's PT boats were used for the first time as troop carriers, carrying 70 soldiers in addition to the crew.

Mumma's PT boats continued their raiding actions in support of the New Guinea campaign. In December 1943, Mumma received this letter from Australian General Frank H. Berryman:

H.Q. 2 AUST CORPS, 1 Dec. 43.

Commander M. C. MUMMA USN,

Comd MTB Squadrons, Seventh Fleet, US NAVY

1. On behalf of 2 Aust Corps I wish to express appreciation of the excellent work being done by units of your command in the VITIAZ STRAITS area.
2. The immediate success of their operations will have been evident to the personnel as witness the continual and steady destruction of the enemy's barges over the last few months.
3. But there is another and more far reaching aspect of these operations which I feel should be made known to all taking part, and that is the telling effect which has been wrought upon the enemy's land forces in the FINSCHHAFEN area.
4. The following evidence emerging from the recent operations will illustrate the cumulative effect of the activities of your command.
  1. The small degree to which the enemy has used artillery indicates a shortage of ammunition.
  2. The enemy, in an endeavour to protect his barges, has been forced to dispose his normal field artillery over 50 miles of coast when those guns might well have been used in the coastal sector against our land troops.
  3. Many Japanese diary entries describe the shortage of rations and the regular fatigues of foraging parties to collect native food, which are becoming increasingly difficult to obtain.
  4. A Japanese PW [prisoner of war] stated that three days rice augmented by native food now has to last 9 days, this is supported by the absence of food and the presence of native roots on enemy dead.
  5. There is definite evidence that the enemy has in one area slaughtered and eaten his pack-carrying animals.
  6. There is evidence that reinforcements have arrived in the WEWAK area, but, it is believed, the enemy has been unable to send large numbers forward because of his inability to maintain larger forces in the forward area.
  7. A PW states that the enemy has been forced to send carrying parties back to KANOMI to carry supplies, thus reducing the fighting troops capable of being placed against our land troops.
  From the above you will see how effective has been the work of your squadrons, and how it has contributed to the recent defeat of the enemy.
5. Without your willing cooperation it would not have been possible for our officers to visit FINSCHHAFEN quickly or to have ensured the timely arrival of urgently needed medical supplies such as blood plasma. The number of officers you have carried from BUNA to FINSCHHAFEN has been considerable and must at times have been a strain on the food supplies in your PT Boats, but at all times the courtesy and open hearted hospitality has been most marked and has been deeply appreciated.
6. All ranks of 2 Aust Corps appreciate your help, and, I know, will join me in wishing you every continued success. I would be grateful if you would convey to your officers and crews our appreciation of their cooperation, courtesy and hospitality.

—F. H. BERRYMAN,
Maj-Gen, Comd 2 Aust Corps.

On 8 February 1944, Mumma was relieved as Commander Motor Torpedo Boat Squadrons Seventh Fleet and Commander Task Group 70.1 For his service, Commander Mumma was awarded a Legion of Merit with a gold star in lieu of a second Legion of Merit.

== Later life ==
During 1944 and 1945, Mumma was the naval aide to the US Secretary of the Navy, James Forrestal. Mumma's picture (top) shows him wearing the 4-loop blue and gold aiguillette as the aide to the last cabinet-level Secretary of the Navy. Mumma's time as aide was the last year of World War II; Forrestal was concerned with war termination and Navy demobilization.

Leaving duty as Forrestal's aide, Mumma assumed responsibilities as the Planning Control Director of the Bureau of Naval Personnel. He retired from active duty in 1946, only to be recalled for the Korean War. His last military assignment was as the Chief Planning Officer for the Selective Service System from 1951 to 1953.

From 1955 to 1957, Admiral Mumma was president of the National Rifle Association, and until his death was a member of the association's executive council. Continuing his interest in rifle marksmanship, Mumma was a long-time member of the National Board for the Promotion of Rifle Practice. Like his father had (in 1904), Mumma earned NBPRP Distinguished Marksman in 1927.

Rear Admiral Mumma died of cancer in 1968 at his home (3667 East Baker Street) in Tucson, Arizona.

== Legacy ==
Mort Bay, 15 miles north of Morobe, Papua New Guinea, was named by Australian hydrographers in Commander Mumma's honor. Mort Bay was the point of departure for the landing at Nassau Bay, 29 June 1943.

The Mumma Trophy is presented to the national champion rifle marksman by the National Rifle Association. The trophy, a large silver urn on a wooden pedestal, is inscribed:

The Mumma Trophy. Presented to the National Rifle Association of America in Memory of Colonel Morton C. Mumma, United States Army. Distinguished Rifleman and NRA Honorary Director for Life 1878–1945, and Rear Admiral Morton C. Mumma, Jr., United States Navy. Distinguished Rifleman and NRA Honorary Life Member 1904–1968.

== Awards ==
- Submarine Combat Patrol insignia
- Submarine Qualification Insignia
- Navy Cross
- Legion of Merit with gold star
- World War I Victory Medal
- American Defense Service Medal with "FLEET" clasp
- American Campaign Medal
- Asiatic–Pacific Campaign Medal
- World War II Victory Medal
- National Defense Service Medal
- Navy Expert Rifleman Medal
- Navy Expert Pistol Shot Medal

== Notes ==
National Rifle Association of America
Preceded by J. Alvin Badeaux	President of the NRA; 1955	Succeeded by George R. Whittington
