= William A. Brockett =

American Navy admiral (1914–1984)

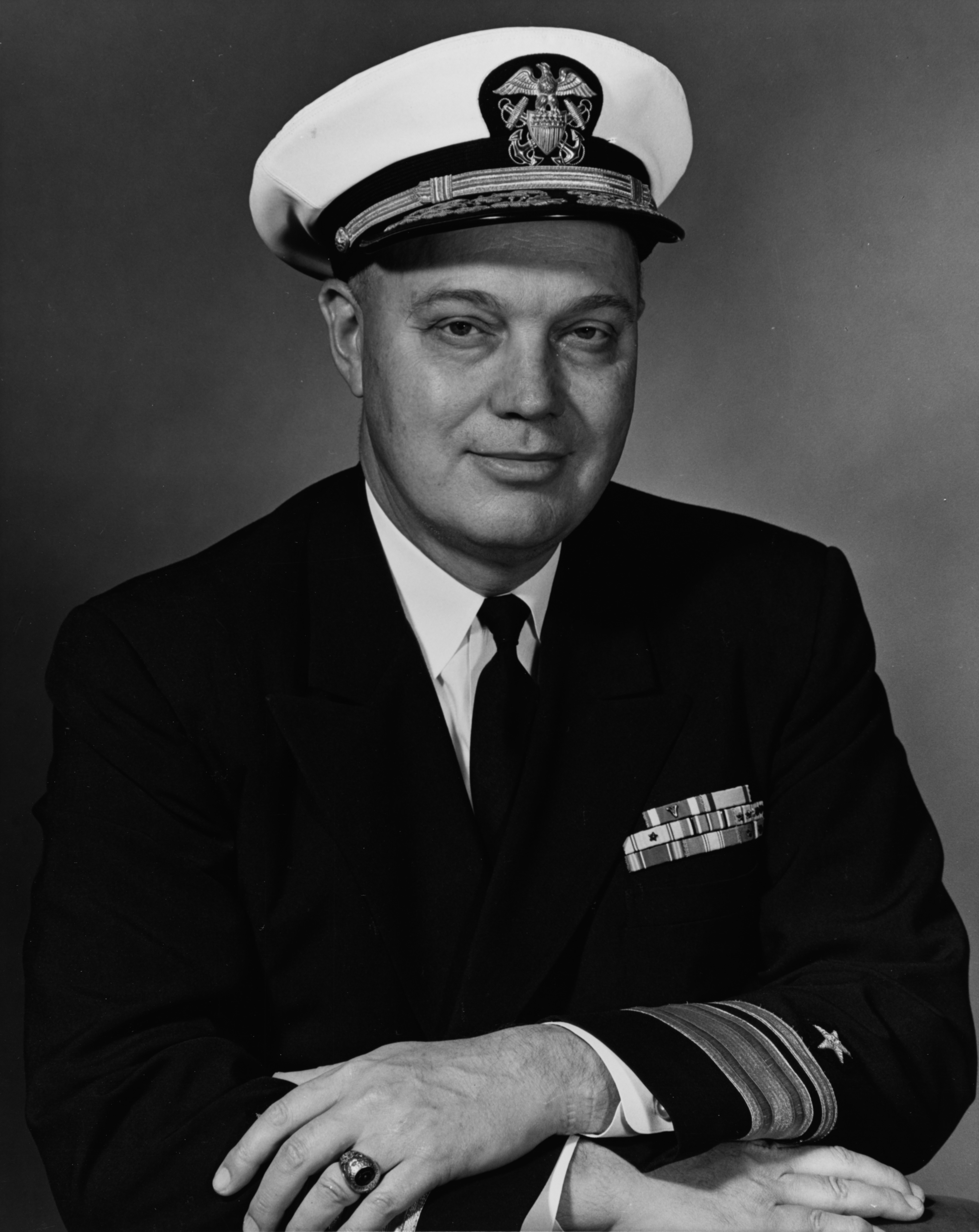
- Born: William Alden Brockett; February 22, 1914; Illinois, US
- Died: September 23, 1984 (aged 70); San Diego, California, US
- Military career
- Allegiance: United States
- Branch: United States Navy
- Service years: 1934–1966
- Rank: Rear Admiral
- Commands: Bureau of Ships; Boston Naval Shipyard
- Conflicts: Battle of Shanghai; World War II; Vietnam War
- Awards: Legion of Merit
- Other work: President of the Webb Institute of Naval Architecture

Signature
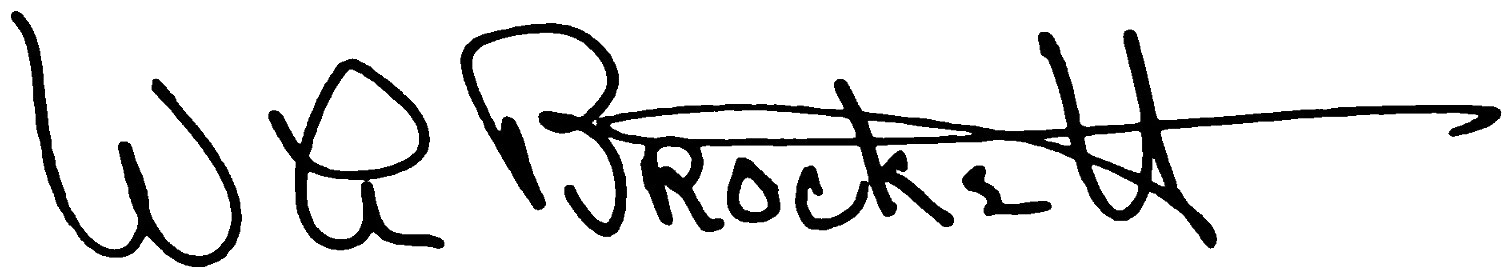

Rear Admiral William A. Brockett (February 22, 1914 – September 23, 1984) was a naval engineer and author. Raised in Litchfield and New London, Connecticut, Brockett served aboard a US gunboat in China at the time of the Battle of Shanghai in August 1937. In 1950, he co-authored with Robert M. Johnston Elements of Applied Thermodynamics, which was required reading by naval engineering students of the United States Naval Academy for over forty years. During the Vietnam War, he was Chief of the United States Navy's Bureau of Ships. He then served as President of the Webb Institute of Naval Architecture from 1966 to 1974.

== Education ==
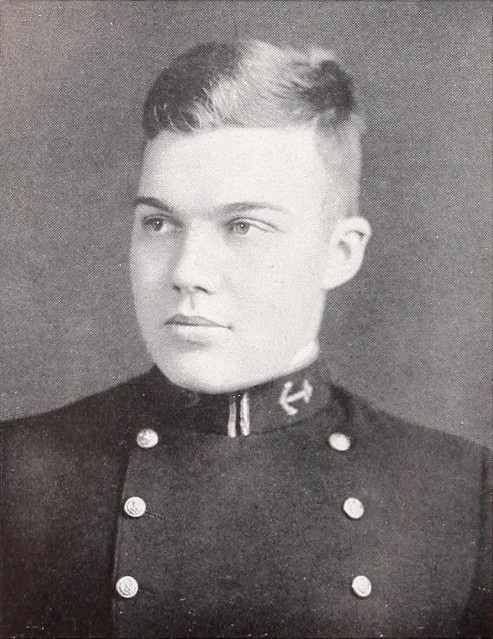
Brockett as a Naval Academy midshipman

Brockett attended the US Naval Academy, lettering in rowing in the same 1933 ceremony that his deputy at BuShips, Charles Curtze, received recognition for his superior performance in gymnastics. He graduated with a B.S. degree on May 31, 1934. Brockett later attended the Naval Postgraduate School. He completed an M.S. degree in naval architecture and marine engineering at the Massachusetts Institute of Technology in 1943. His thesis advisor was Joseph H. Keenan.

== Career ==
Lieutenant (JG) Brockett served in Shanghai, China aboard the River gunboat USS Luzon (PG-47). He was temporarily attached to Headquarters Company, Fourth Marines, the so-called China Marines, at Shanghai, China in May 1940. He left Shanghai on June 9, 1940, bound for the US Naval Academy aboard the SS President Cleveland.

During World War II, Brockett served as an engineer officer aboard the heavy cruiser New Orleans from 1943 to 1945. He was promoted to commander on February 1, 1944. After the war, Brockett served as an instructor of marine engineering back at the Naval Academy.

Brockett was promoted to captain on November 1, 1952, and rear admiral on July 1, 1961. He served as commander of the Boston Naval Shipyard and as Assistant Chief of the Bureau of Ships for Design, Shipbuilding and Fleet Maintenance. Brockett became Chief of the bureau in April 1963, succeeding Ralph K. James.

As Chief of BuShips, Brockett played a role in the investigation of the April 1963 sinking of the nuclear-powered submarine USS Thresher (SSN-593). He also participated in discussions with NASA regarding the use of stable ocean platforms in lieu of instrumentation ships for the early United States space program.

Brockett's telegram to the commissioning of the USS Ulysses S. Grant (SSBN-631) was read aloud at the ceremony on July 17, 1964.

Brockett and his vice chief, Charles A. Curtze, submitted resignations from their posts at BuShips and requested early retirement in October 1965 in protest over Secretary of Defense McNamara's increasing centralization of military power in The Pentagon. Brockett retired on February 1, 1966, after being succeeded by Edward J. Fahy.

Brockett spoke at the commissioning of the USS Gallup (PGM-85) on October 22, 1966.

== Honors ==
Brockett was awarded the Legion of Merit for his service as Chief of the Bureau of Ships.

The Webb Institute sponsors an annual scholarship in Brockett's honor.

== Personal ==
In 1939, Brockett married Juana Sutton (February 7, 1912 – October 7, 2004). She was an actress best known for her supporting role in Charlie Chaplin's 1936 film Modern Times. They had a son and a daughter.

Their son William Alden Brockett Jr. (January 12, 1941 – June 15, 1996) was a 1962 Naval Academy graduate who later attended law school at Yale University and became a successful California defense attorney.

Brockett died in San Diego, California on September 23, 1984.
