= Milton W. Shreve =

American politician (1858–1939)

Milton William Shreve
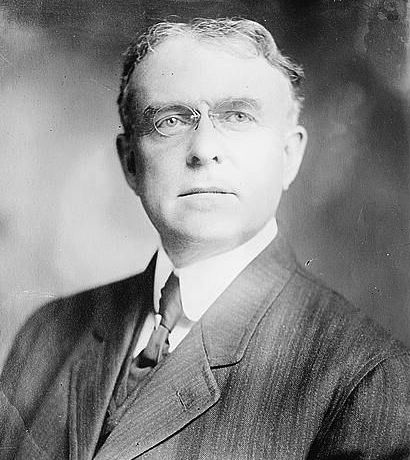

Member of the U.S. House of Representatives from Pennsylvania
- In office March 4, 1913 – March 3, 1915
- Preceded by: Arthur L. Bates
- Succeeded by: Michael Liebel, Jr.
- Constituency: 25th district
- In office March 4, 1919 – March 3, 1933
- Preceded by: Henry A. Clark (25th); Stephen G. Porter (29th)
- Succeeded by: Henry W. Temple (25th); Charles N. Crosby (29th)
- Constituency: 25th district (1919-23); 29th district (1923-33)

Member of the Pennsylvania House of Representatives
- In office 1907–1912

Personal details
- Born: May 3, 1858 Chapmanville, Pennsylvania, U.S.
- Died: December 23, 1939 (aged 81)
- Party: Republican

Milton William Shreve (May 3, 1858 – December 23, 1939) was a Republican member of the U.S. House of Representatives from Pennsylvania.

== Biography ==
Milton W. Shreve was born in Chapmanville, Pennsylvania. He attended the Edinboro State Normal School and Allegheny College in Meadville, Pennsylvania. He graduated from Bucknell University in Lewisburg, Pennsylvania, in 1884. He studied law and was admitted to the bar in Erie County, Pennsylvania and commenced practice in Erie, Pennsylvania. He was the Erie County district attorney from 1899 to 1902. He was a member of the Pennsylvania State House of Representatives from 1907 to 1912 and in the session of 1911 succeeded to the speakership.

Shreve was elected as a Republican to the Sixty-third Congress. He was an unsuccessful candidate for reelection in 1914. He resumed the practice of law in Erie, and also engaged in banking and interested in several manufacturing plants. He was again elected as a Republican to the Sixty-sixth Congress; reelected as an Independent Republican to the Sixty-seventh Congress and as a Republican to the Sixty-eighth through Seventy-second Congresses. He was an unsuccessful candidate for reelection in 1932. He resumed the practice of law in Erie until his death there. He was buried in Erie Cemetery.

== See also ==
- List of representatives from Pennsylvania's 25th congressional district

== Sources ==
- United States Congress. "Milton W. Shreve (id: S000387)". Biographical Directory of the United States Congress.
- The Political Graveyard

U.S. House of Representatives
Preceded by Arthur L. Bates	Member of the U.S. House of Representatives from Pennsylvania's 25th congressional district 1913–1915	Succeeded by Michael Liebel, Jr.
Preceded by Henry A. Clark	Member of the U.S. House of Representatives from Pennsylvania's 25th congressional district 1919–1923	Succeeded by Henry W. Temple
Preceded by Stephen G. Porter	Member of the U.S. House of Representatives from Pennsylvania's 29th congressional district 1923–1933	Succeeded by Charles N. Crosby
