= Erie Cemetery =

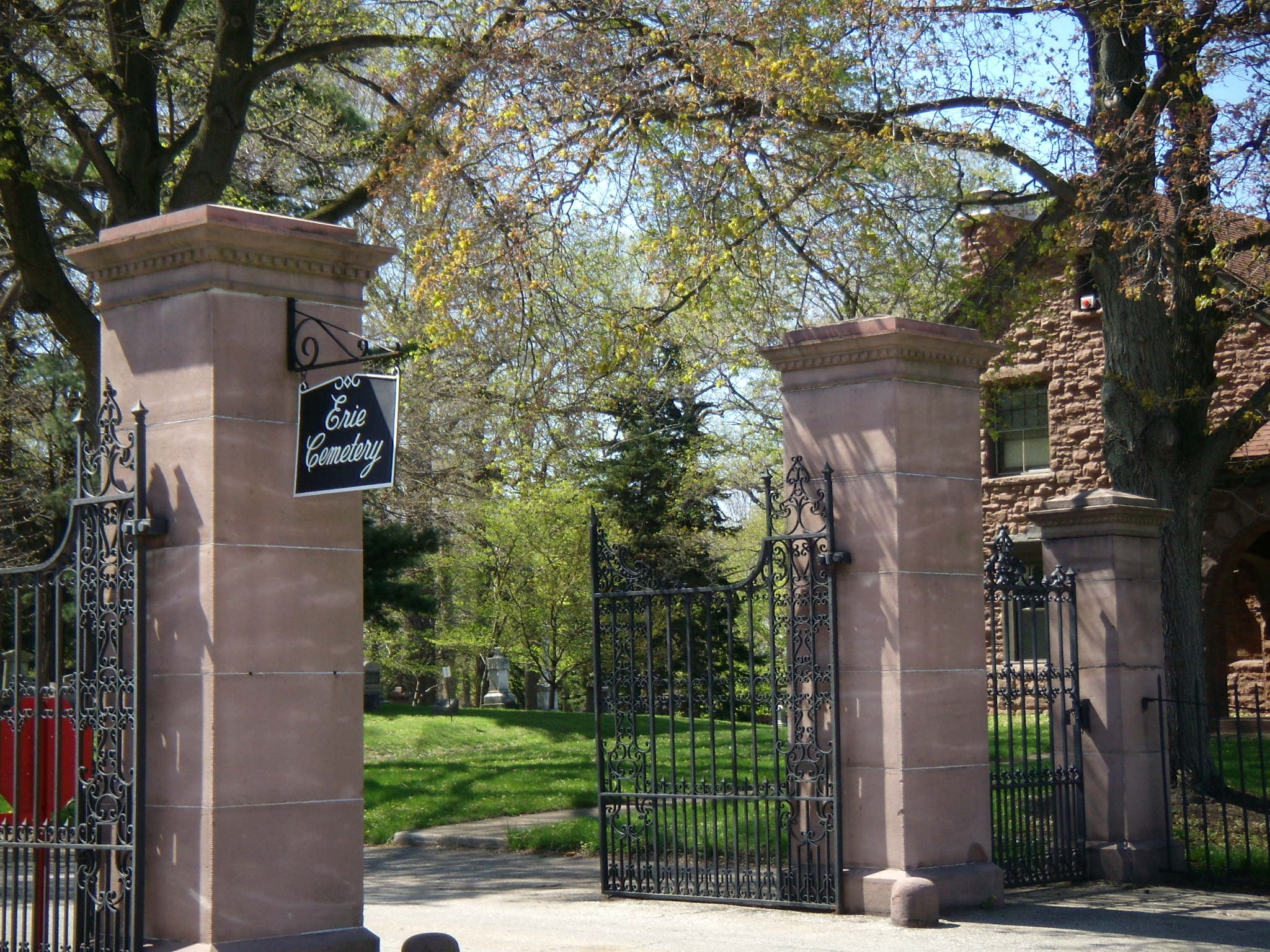
- Erie Cemetery's gate
- Interactive map of Erie Cemetery

Details
- Established: 1850
- Location: Erie, Pennsylvania
- Country: United States
- Coordinates: 42°6′41″N 80°5′5″W
- Type: Public
- Owned by: Erie Cemetery Association
- Size: 75 acres (30 ha)
- Website: Erie Cemetery
- Find a Grave: Erie Cemetery
- The Political Graveyard: Erie Cemetery

Erie Cemetery is a historic cemetery located in Erie, Pennsylvania. It is situated on 75 acres (30 ha) of land bordered on the east by Chestnut Street, the west by Cherry Street, the north by 19th Street, and the south by 26th Street.

== History ==
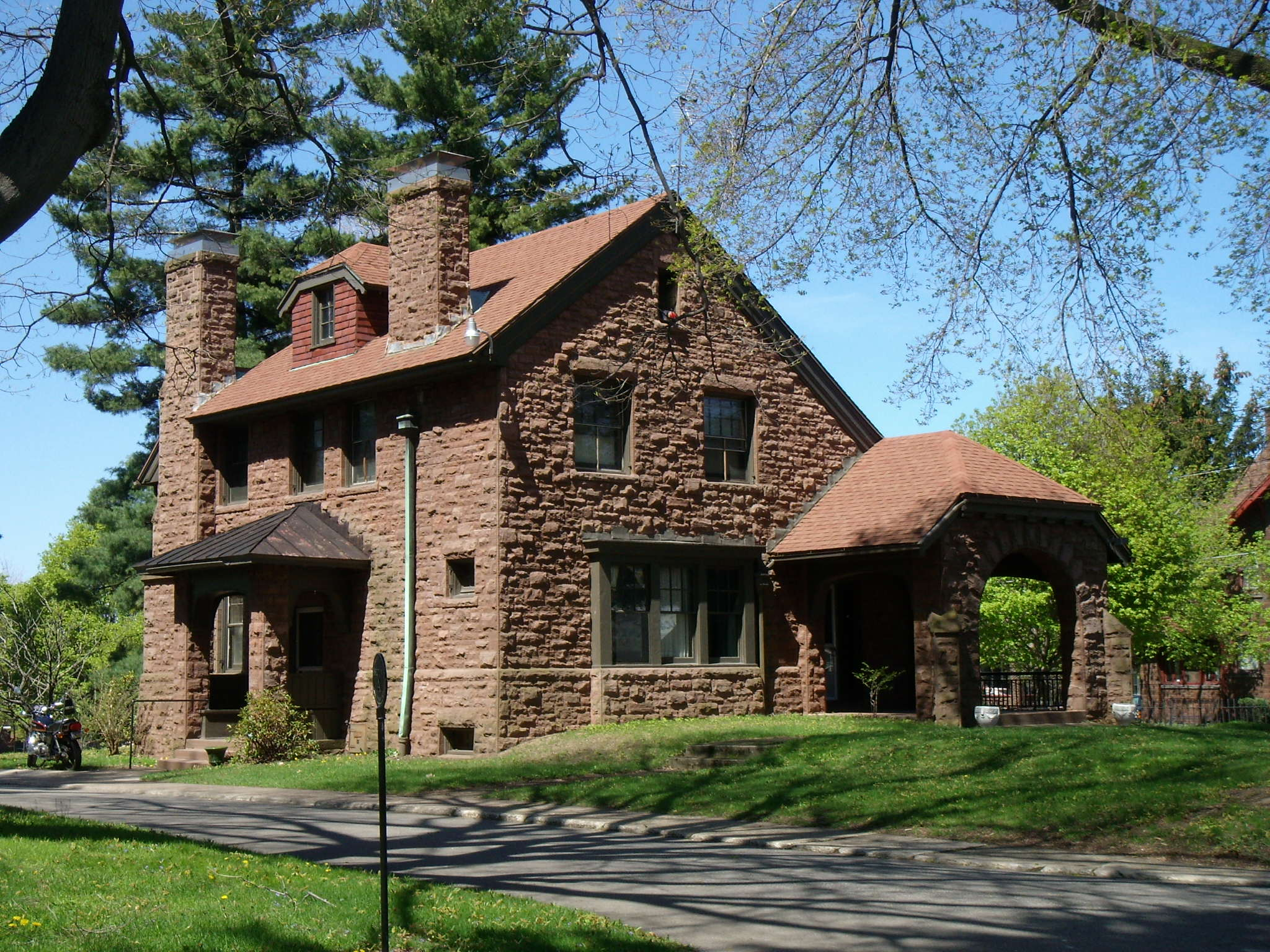
Porters' house is just to the right inside the entrance gate.

The cemetery was conceived in October 1846 when a citizens group circulated a petition and collected $1,500 towards the purchase of land. A new subscription effort in December 1849 led to the incorporation of the cemetery on 29 January 1850, at which time seven managers were named. The deed was conveyed to the corporation on 28 March 1850, at which time a $1,500 deposit was paid and a judgment bond of $6,000 signed to secure payment of the balance due. Officers of the corporation were elected on 24 May 1850, namely George A. Eliot, President; William A. Brown, Secretary; and J. C. Spencer, Treasurer. H. Daniels was hired in December 1850 to develop the property. The formal opening of the cemetery took place on 20 May 1851. A porters' lodge was erected near the main entrance before 1885.

The Erie Cemetery Association manages the Erie Cemetery, as well as Laurel Hill Cemetery in Millcreek Township and Wintergreen Gorge Cemetery in Harborcreek Township.

== Notable interments ==
Notable people buried at the Erie Cemetery:

Name	Date of birth	Date of death	Notable event or occupation
Elijah Babbitt	29 July 1795	9 January 1887	U.S. Congressman
Rdml. John Marshall Bowyer	19 June 1853	15 March 1912	Rear Admiral, U.S.N., Superintendent of US Naval Academy, 1909–1911
Samuel M. Brainerd	13 November 1842	21 November 1889	U.S. Congressman
Alexander W. Brewster	6 June 1796	26 May 1851	Burgess of Erie (first person buried at the cemetery)
Harry T. Burleigh	2 December 1866	12 December 1945	Famous African-American singer
Henry A. Clark	7 January 1850	15 February 1944	U.S. Congressman
Judah Colt	1 July 1761	11 October 1832	Early settler of Erie County
Charles A. Curtze	8 May 1911	26 December 2007	World War II veteran, U.S. Navy rear admiral
Ed Cushman	27 March 1852	26 September 1915	Major League Baseball pitcher, pitched no-hitter for Milwaukee Brewers in 1884
Samuel A. Davenport	15 January 1834	1 August 1911	U.S. Congressman
Daniel Dobbins	5 January 1776	29 February 1856	War of 1812 veteran, manager of the construction of Perry's fleet for the Battle of Lake Erie.
Andrew P. Forbeck	29 April 1881	24 April 1924	Philippine–American War veteran, Medal of Honor recipient
John Galbraith	2 August 1794	15 June 1860	U.S. Congressman
William Himrod	19 May 1791	21 June 1873	Industrialist, founder of Himrod Mission school
Sam Jethroe	23 January 1917	16 June 2001	Major League Baseball player
David B. McCreary	27 February 1826	4 February 1906	State legislator
Prescott Metcalf	25 January 1813	14 October 1891	former Mayor of Erie
Seth Read	6 March 1746	19 March 1797	Veteran of the Battle of Bunker Hill, early settler of Erie County
Charles M. Reed	3 April 1803	16 December 1871	U.S. Congressman
William L. Scott	2 July 1828	19 September 1891	U.S. Congressman, President of the Erie and Pittsburgh Railroad
Milton W. Shreve	3 May 1858	23 December 1939	U.S. Congressman, Erie County District Attorney, Pennsylvania state representative
Thomas H. Sill	11 October 1783	7 February 1856	U.S. Congressman, Burgess of Erie, Erie Postmaster
Strong Vincent	17 June 1837	7 July 1863	Brigadier General, hero of Little Round Top at the Battle of Gettysburg
Milden Henry Wilson	26 July 1847	5 February 1924	American Civil War and American Indian Wars veteran, Medal of Honor recipient (Battle of Big Hole, MT)
William Young	1835	26 December 1878	American Civil War veteran, Medal of Honor recipient

Alexander Brewster was the first person buried at the cemetery.
