= David B. McCreary =

American politician and lawyer (1826–1906)

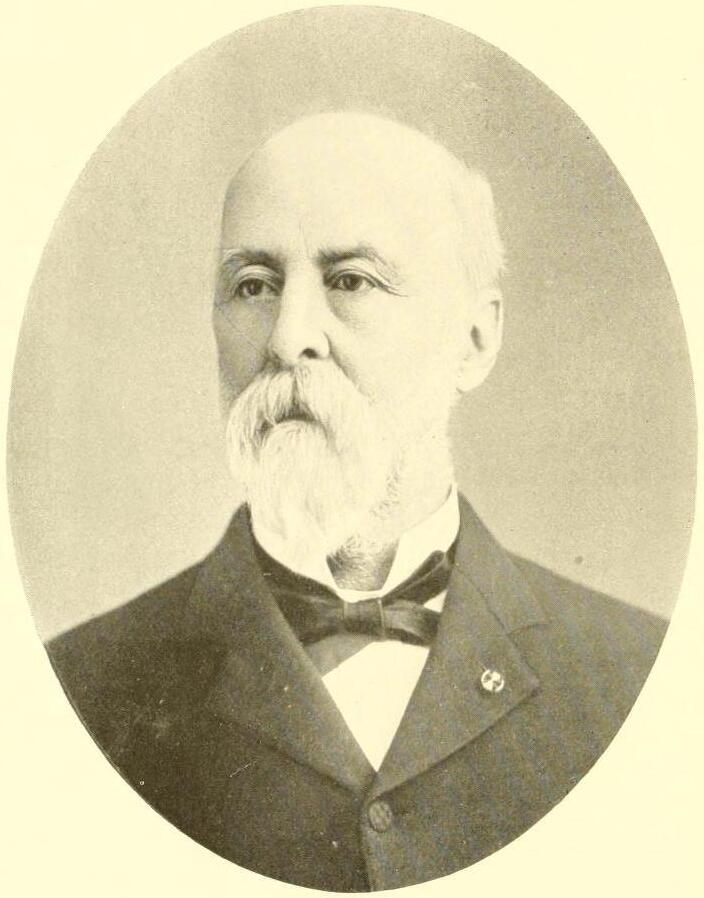
- McCreary in an 1895 publication

Member of the Pennsylvania Senate from the 49th district
- In office 1889–1896

Member of the Pennsylvania House of Representatives from the Erie County district
- In office 1870–1870
- In office 1866–1867

Personal details
- Born: David Berkley McCreary; February 27, 1826 Millcreek Township, Erie County, Pennsylvania, U.S.
- Died: February 4, 1906 (aged 79) Erie, Pennsylvania, U.S.
- Resting place: Erie Cemetery
- Party: Republican
- Spouse: Annette Julia Gunnison (died 1893)
- Children: 2
- Education: Washington College
- Occupation: Politician; lawyer; educator

David Berkley McCreary (February 27, 1826 – February 4, 1906) was an American politician and lawyer from Pennsylvania.

== Early life ==
David Berkley McCreary was born on February 27, 1826, in Millcreek Township, Erie County, Pennsylvania, to Lydia (née Swan) and Joseph F. McCreary. His father was a farmer. He attended common schools in Millcreek Township and then Erie Academy. He attended Washington College (later Washington & Jefferson College) from 1848 to 1849.

McCreary worked as a teacher in Erie County and in Kentucky. He was admitted to the bar in 1851.

== Career ==
McCreary worked as a lawyer from 1851 until the outbreak of the Civil War.

McCreary enlisted with the Wayne Guards under John W. McLane. He served in company B of the 145th Pennsylvania Infantry Regiment from 1862 to 1865. He was promoted to lieutenant in 1862, became captain of company D of the regiment, and later lieutenant colonel. He was prisoner of war for 10 months from 1864 to 1865 at Libby, Mason, Charleston and Columbia prisons. He attained the rank of colonel and was brevetted brigadier general. He was mustered out on May 31, 1865.

McCreary was elected as a Republican to the Pennsylvania House of Representatives. He represented Erie County from 1866 to 1867 and in 1870. He was adjutant general of the Pennsylvania National Guard from 1867 to 1870. He was elected as a Republican and served in the Pennsylvania Senate, representing the 49th district from 1889 to 1896. He served on the congressional apportionment, insurance, general judiciary, library, military affairs, and mines and mining committees. He was chairman of the special judiciary committee.

Following the war, McCreary continued practicing law until 1906. He start the firm McCreary and Clark with his son-in-law Henry Alden Clark. He was trustee of Dixmont State Hospital for six years.

== Personal life ==
McCreary married Annette Julia Gunnison, daughter of E. D. Gunnison. His wife died in 1893. They had a daughter and son, Sophy Gertrude and Wirt. His daughter married Pennsylvania politician Henry Alden Clark.

McCreary died on February 4, 1906, at the home of his daughter in Erie. He was buried in Erie Cemetery.
