= Henry Alden Clark =

American politician (1850–1944)

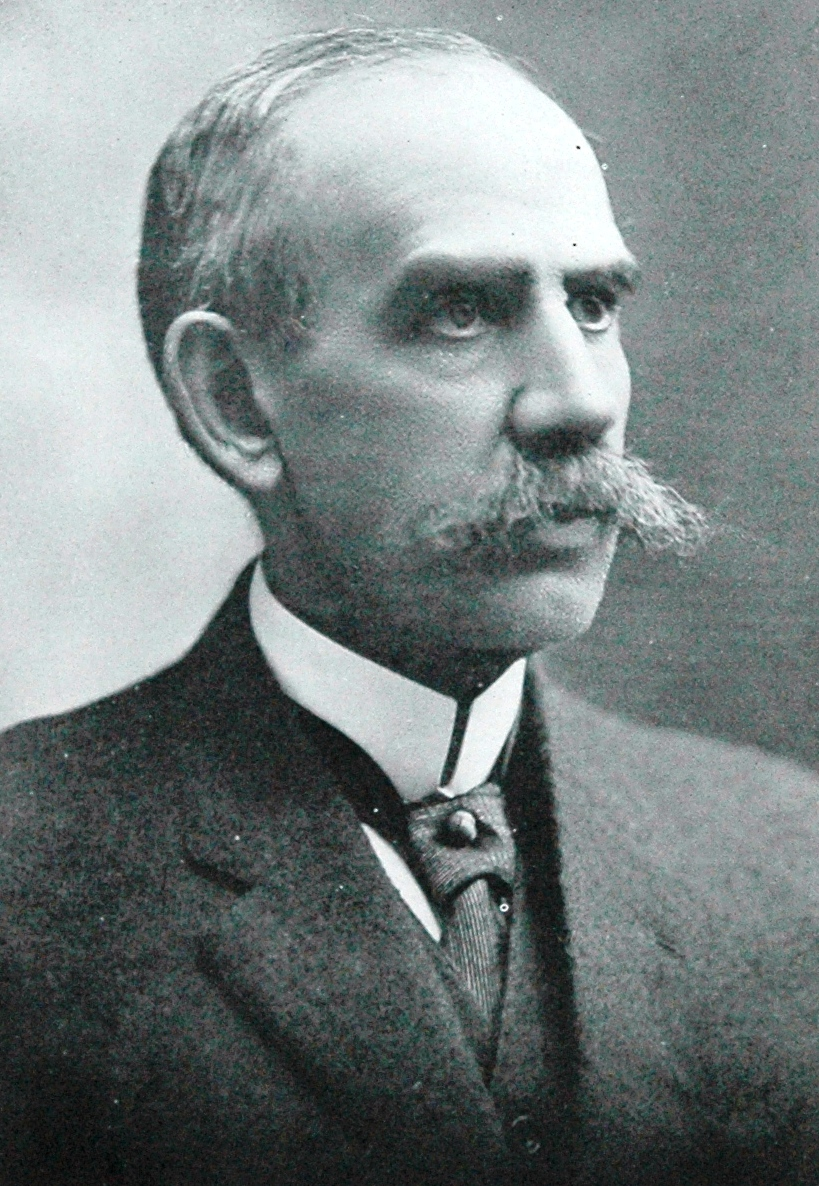

Member of the U.S. House of Representatives from Pennsylvania's 25th district
- In office March 4, 1917 – March 4, 1919
- Preceded by: Michael Liebel, Jr.
- Succeeded by: Milton W. Shreve

Member of the Pennsylvania House of Representatives
- In office 1911–1915

Personal details
- Born: January 7, 1850 Harborcreek Township, Pennsylvania, U.S.
- Died: February 15, 1944 (aged 94)
- Party: Republican

Henry Alden Clark (January 7, 1850 – February 15, 1944) was a Republican member of the U.S. House of Representatives from Pennsylvania.

== Career ==
After admission to the bar in 1878, Clark was associated with the Edison electric light interests in New York. He moved to Erie, Pennsylvania, in 1882, continuing with the Edison corporation until 1887. He was admitted to the Pennsylvania bar, and served as a member of the Common Council of Erie in 1888.

He bought and edited the Erie Gazette from 1890 to 1892. He served as Chairman of the Republican city and county committees in 1890, and as City Solicitor of Erie from 1896 until 1899. He served in the Pennsylvania State Senate from 1911 through 1915.

Clark was elected as a Republican to the Sixty-fifth Congress. He was not a candidate for renomination in 1918. He resumed the practice of his profession, and served as judge of the Orphans’ Court for Erie County from 1921 to 1931. He died in Erie and is interred in Erie Cemetery.

== Personal life ==
Clark was born in Harborcreek Township, Pennsylvania. He attended the Erie Academy in 1864, the State Normal School to Edinboro, Pennsylvania, in 1865 and 1866, and Willoughby Collegiate Institute in Willoughby, Ohio, in 1866 and 1867. Clark taught school, and graduated from the Erie Central High School in 1870, from Harvard University in 1874, and from Harvard Law School in 1877. He was admitted to the bar in Fall River, Massachusetts, in March 1878. While an undergraduate at Harvard, Clark co-founded the school's campus newspaper, The Harvard Crimson.

Clark was President of the Erie Historical Society and the University Club of Erie. He married the daughter of Pennsylvania state senator David B. McCreary, his first law partner in Erie, Pa.

== Sources ==
- United States Congress. "Henry Alden Clark (id: C000433)". Biographical Directory of the United States Congress.
- The Political Graveyard

U.S. House of Representatives
Preceded by Michael Liebel, Jr.	Member of the U.S. House of Representatives from Pennsylvania's 25th congressional district 1917–1919	Succeeded by Milton W. Shreve
