= Gillette Mach3 =

Line of razors produced by Gillette

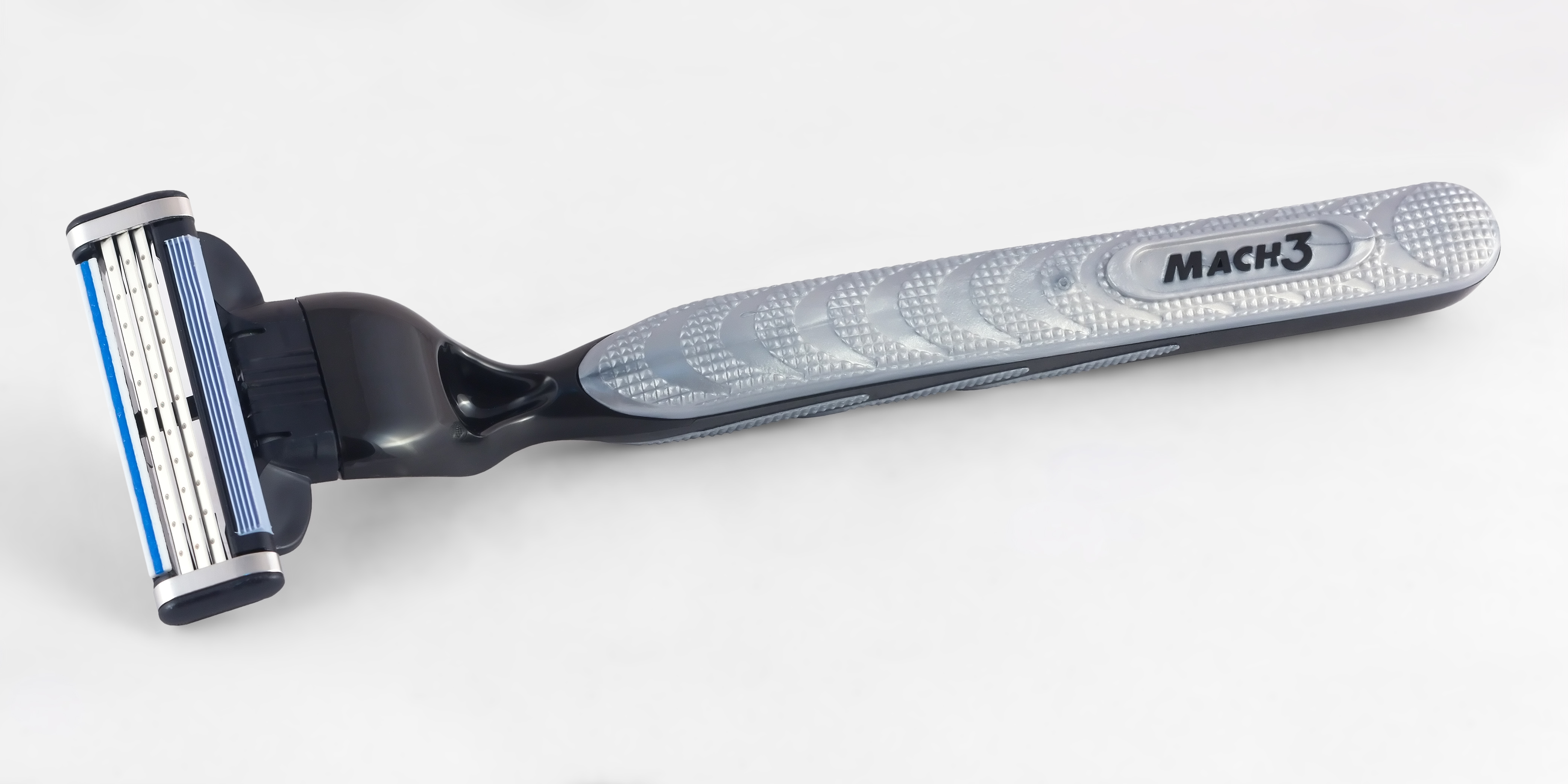
- Type: Cartridge safety razor
- Inception: June 1998; 28 years ago
- Manufacturer: Procter & Gamble
- Available: Yes
- Models: Mach3; Mach3 Turbo; M3Power; Mach3 Sensitive; Mach3 Start (Note: the razor is known in Latin America as Gillette Mach 3 Aqua Grip.); Mach3 Disposable; Mach3 Body (Note: in Brazil the razor is known as Gillette Mach 3 Corpo in Brazilian Portuguese and in Latin America is known as Gillette Mach 3 Cuerpo in Spanish.)

The Gillette Mach3 (/mækˈθriː/ mak-THREE or /mɑːkˈθriː/ mahk-THREE) is a line of razors produced by Gillette.

== Production ==
Prior to the announcement, Gillette built plywood walls of stone around the production lines in its factory in Boston, in order to keep it a secret from many of its own employees. Gillette said its manufacturing plant was capable of producing 250 cartridges per minute.

=== Trade secret theft ===
Steven Davis, a process controls engineer working for a Gillette subcontractor that designed the Mach3, stole information about the Mach3 and faxed it to Gillette's competitors, Warner-Lambert, Bic, and American Safety Razor. Davis pleaded guilty to five counts of stealing Gillette's trade secrets in January 1998. Davis was sentenced to 27 months in prison. Davis said he committed the crime because he was angry at his boss.

== History ==
Gillette CEO Alfred Zeien first proposed creating a three-bladed razor to Gillette's board in April 1995. Following more than $750 million in R&D, Gillette announced the Mach3 razor on April 14, 1998.

Gillette budgeted $300 million for a two-year advertising campaign for the Mach3 razor. Gillette marketed the three-blade design as allowing for a shave with less pressure to the skin and with fewer strokes, thereby reducing skin irritation. The Mach3 razor was released in North America during the last week of June 1998, costing 35 percent more than the SensorExcel razor. It was first sold in Europe in September 1998.

In October 2001, Gillette announced the Mach3 Turbo as a premium successor to the standard Mach3 razor, advertising features such as more micro-fins, anti-friction blades, and increased lubrication. The introductory price was set at $9 for a handle and two cartridges, a 17% price premium over the original model, and had $300 million in sales its first year.

In January 2004, a powered, pulsating version of the Mach3 under the name M3Power was announced at a price of $14.99 for the shaving system (including a battery) and was commercially released in May 2004. An updated design, the M3Power Nitro, was unveiled in April 2005.

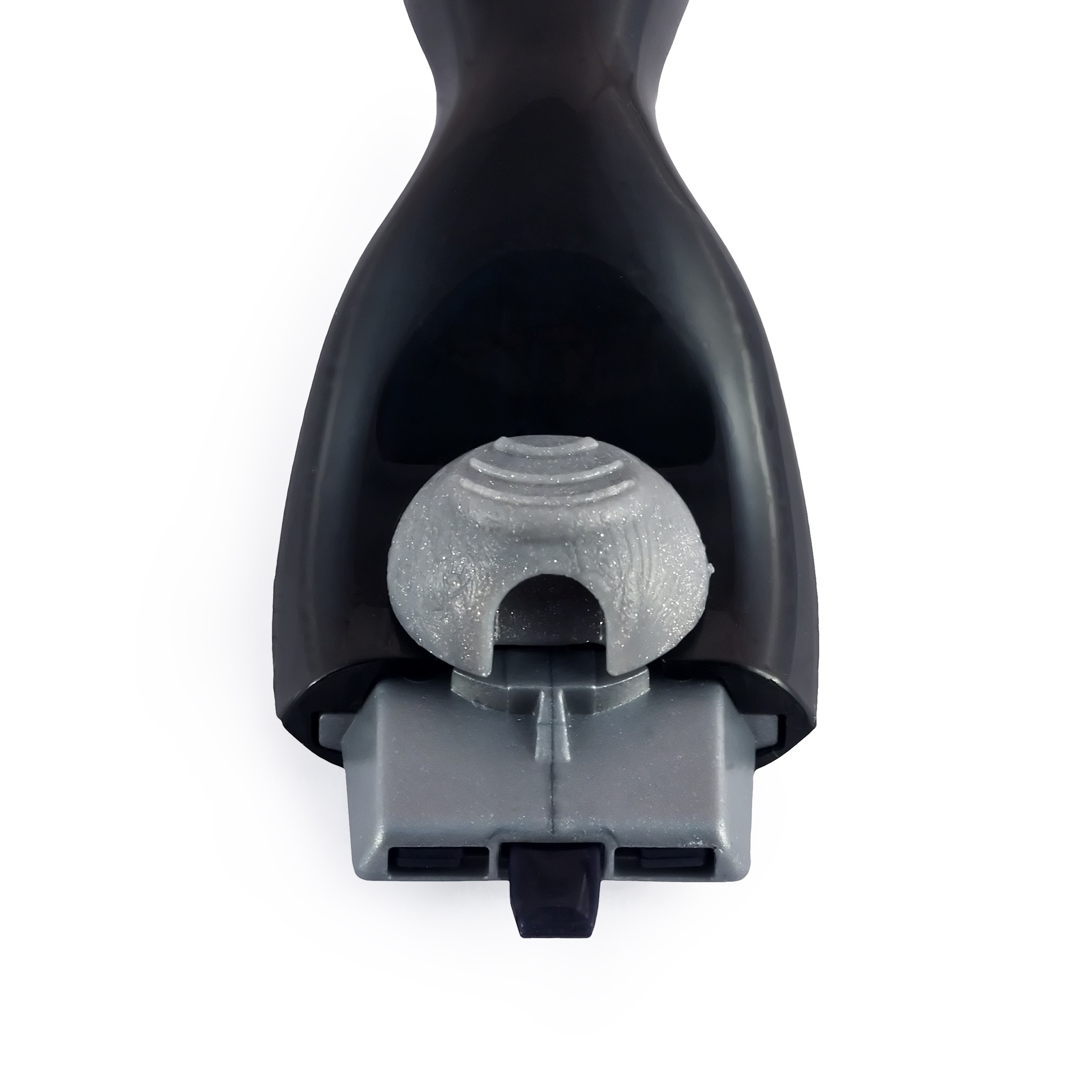
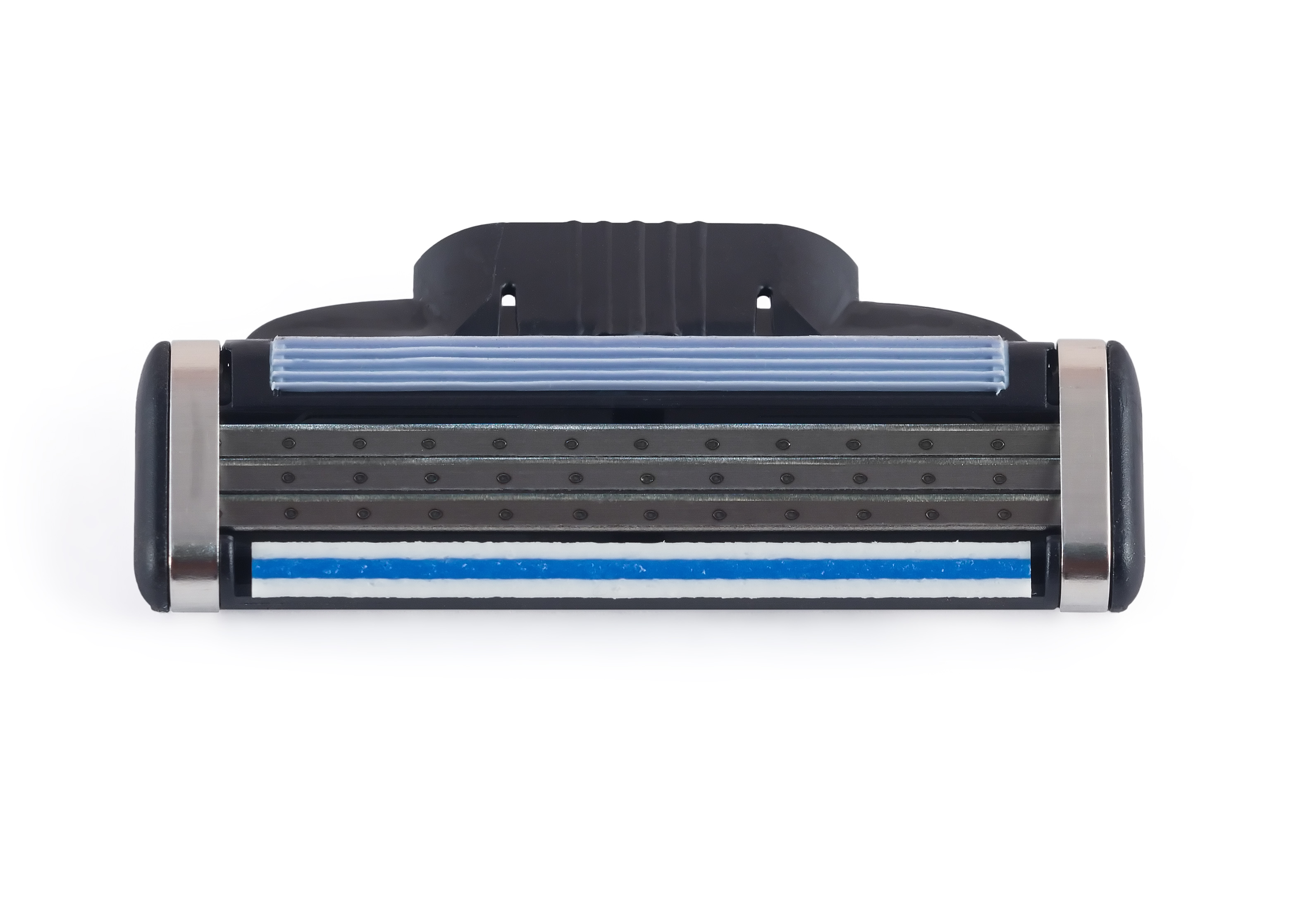
The Gillette Mach3 cartridge attachment mechanism (top) and a blade cartridge (bottom).
