= Alfred Zeien =

American businessman (1930–2019)

Alfred "Al" Zeien (25 February 1930 – 18 February 2019) was an American businessman who chaired the personal care brand Gillette.

He died on 18 February 2019. The Zeien Lecture Series at the Webb Institute is named after him.

== Early life and education ==
Zeien was born on 25 February 1930 and grew up New York. His father was an immigrant from Luxembourg and his mother was from France. He studied naval architecture at the Webb Institute, Long Island and later attended Harvard Business School, where he completed his MBA in 1955.

== Career ==
Following his graduation, Zeien worked at Sea Beaver, involved in the construction of minesweepers during the Korean War. Later, he joined the General Dynamics Electric Boat yard, where he held various roles, including chief estimator and sales manager.

In 1968, Zeien joined Gillette, initially overseeing the international division following Gillette's acquisition of Braun. His responsibilities at Gillette expanded over the years, leading to his appointment as president and chief operating officer in 1991, and shortly after, chairman and CEO, following the death of Colman Mockler. During his tenure at Gillette, Zeien focused on global expansion and product development, including the creation of the Mach3, the first three-blade razor. This period saw the acquisition of brands such as Parker Pen and Duracell, and a significant increase in Gillette's international presence.

During his career, Zeien also served on multiple boards across various industries and institutions. He maintained a connection with the Webb Institute, supporting educational initiatives through the Alfred M. Zeien Lecture Series and the Dr. and Mrs. Alfred M. Zeien '52 Student Scholar Endowment.

== Awards and recognition ==
Zeien received recognition for his professional achievements, including an Honorary Doctor of Science degree from Webb Institute in 1997 and the William Selkirk Owen Award in 2013.
