= Alexander W. Brewster =

American politician

Alexander W. Brewster (5 June 1796 – 6 May 1851) was a prominent merchant and manufacturer, as well as a politician and educator in Erie, Pennsylvania.

== Career ==
Brewster was a local educator. He taught at the Grubb Schoolhouse in Mill Creek, Pennsylvania, in 1818. He taught at a log house at 7th and Holland in Erie, and at the Erie Academy.

He served as sheriff of Erie County, Pennsylvania, from 1828 to 1831. He served as a burgess in Erie, Pennsylvania, in 1849.

He was the first person buried at Erie Cemetery, a graveyard he helped organize. The Brewster Home, on East 5th Street between Holland and French Streets in Erie, was originally built in 1823 and restored by Erie Insurance in 1984.
