= 145th Pennsylvania Infantry Regiment =

Union Army infantry regiment

145th Pennsylvania Volunteer Infantry
- Active: September 5, 1862, to May 31, 1865
- Country: United States
- Allegiance: Union
- Branch: Infantry
- Size: 1,456
- Engagements: Battle of Antietam; Battle of Fredericksburg; Battle of Chancellorsville; Battle of Gettysburg; Bristoe Campaign; Mine Run Campaign; Battle of the Wilderness; Battle of Spotsylvania Court House; Battle of Totopotomoy Creek; Battle of Cold Harbor; Siege of Petersburg; First Battle of Deep Bottom; Second Battle of Deep Bottom; Second Battle of Ream's Station; Appomattox Campaign; Battle of Sailor's Creek

The 145th Pennsylvania Volunteer Infantry was an infantry regiment that served in the Union Army during the American Civil War.

== Service ==
The 145th Pennsylvania Infantry was organized at Erie, Pennsylvania, and mustered in for a three-year enlistment on September 5, 1862, under the command of Colonel Hiram Loomis Brown.

The regiment was attached to 2nd Brigade, 1st Division, II Corps, Army of the Potomac, to October 1862. 1st Brigade, 1st Division, II Corps, to April 1863. 4th Brigade, 1st Division, II Corps, to May 1865.

The 145th Pennsylvania Infantry mustered out of service on May 31, 1865.

== Detailed service ==
Moved to Chambersburg. Pa., September 11–12, then to Hagerstown and Antietam, Md., September 15–17. Moved to Harpers Ferry, Va., September 22, 1862, and duty there until October 29. Reconnaissance to Charlestown October 16–17. Advance up Loudoun Valley and movement to Falmouth, Va., October 29-November 17. Battle of Fredericksburg December 12–15. Duty at Falmouth, Va., until April 1863. Chancellorsville Campaign April 27-May 6. Battle of Chancellorsville May 1–5. Gettysburg Campaign June 11-July 24. Battle of Gettysburg July 1–3. Pursuit of Lee July 5–24. Duty on line of the Rappahannock until September. Advance from the Rappahannock to the Rapidan September 13–17. Bristoe Campaign October 9–22. Auburn and Bristoe October 14. Advance to line of the Rappahannock November 7–8. Mine Run Campaign November 26-December 2. At Stevensburg until May 1864. Demonstration on the Rapidan February 6–7. Rapidan Campaign May 4-June 12. Battles of the Wilderness May 5–7; Corbin's Bridge May 8; Spotsylvania May 8–12; Po River May 10; Spotsylvania Court House May 12–21. Assault on the Salient May 12. North Anna River May 23–26. On line of the Pamunkey May 26–28. Totopotomoy May 28–31. Cold Harbor June 1–12. Before Petersburg June 16–18. Siege of Petersburg June 16, 1864, to April 2, 1865. Jerusalem Plank Road June 22–23, 1864. Demonstration north of the James at Deep Bottom July 27–29. Deep Bottom July 27–28. Mine Explosion, Petersburg, July 30 (reserve). Demonstration on north side of the James at Deep Bottom August 13–20. Strawberry Plains, Deep Bottom, August 14–18. Ream's Station August 25. Reconnaissance to Hatcher's Run December 7–10. Dabney's Mills, Hatcher's Run, February 5–7, 1865. Watkins' House March 25. Appomattox Campaign March 28-April 9. Skirmishes on line of Hatcher's and Gravelly Runs March 29–30. Hatcher's Run or Boydton Road March 31. Crow's House March 31. Sutherland Station April 2. Sailor's Creek April 6. High Bridge, Farmville, April 7. Appomattox Court House April 9. Surrender of Lee and his army. March to Washington, D.C., May 2–12. Grand Review of the Armies May 23.

== Casualties ==
The regiment lost a total of 422 men during service; 18 officers and 187 enlisted men killed or mortally wounded, 3 officers and 214 enlisted men died of disease.

== Commanders ==
- Colonel Hiram Loomis Brown - wounded in action at the Battle of Fredericksburg; wounded in action at the Battle of Gettysburg, July 2
- Lieutenant Colonel David B. McCreary - commanded at the Battle of Fredericksburg
- Captain John W. Reynolds - commanded at the Battle of Gettysburg until wounded on July 2
- Captain Moses Oliver - commanded at the Battle of Gettysburg
- Captain James H. Hamlin - commanded at the First Battle of Deep Bottom and during the Appomattox Campaign

== See also ==
- List of Pennsylvania Civil War Units
- Pennsylvania in the Civil War
