= Bureau of Ships =

Former bureau of the U.S. Navy (1940–1966)

The United States Navy's Bureau of Ships (BuShips) was established by Congress on 20 June 1940, by a law which consolidated the functions of the Bureau of Construction and Repair (BuC&R) and the Bureau of Engineering (BuEng). The new bureau was to be headed by a chief and deputy-chief, one selected from the Engineering Corps (Marine Engineer) and the other from the Construction Corps (Naval Architect). The chief of the former Bureau of Engineering, Rear Admiral Samuel M. "Mike" Robinson, was named BuShips' first chief, while the former chief of the Bureau of Construction & Repair, Rear Admiral Alexander H. Van Keuren, was named as BuShips' first Deputy-Chief. The bureau's responsibilities included supervising the design, construction, conversion, procurement, maintenance, and repair of ships and other craft for the Navy; managing shipyards, repair facilities, laboratories, and shore stations; developing specifications for fuels and lubricants; and conducting salvage operations.

BuShips was abolished by DOD Order of 9 March 1966, as part of the general overhaul of the Navy's bureau system of material support. BuShips was succeeded by the Naval Ship Systems Command (NAVSHIPS), known as the Naval Sea Systems Command or NAVSEA since 1974.

== Origins ==
The Bureau of Ships had its origins when USS Anderson, first of the Sims-class destroyers to be delivered, was found to be heavier than designed and dangerously top-heavy in early 1939. It was determined that an underestimate by BuEng of the weight of a new machinery design was responsible, and that BuC&R did not have sufficient authority to detect or correct the error during the design process. Initially, Acting Secretary of the Navy Charles Edison proposed consolidation of the design divisions of the two bureaus. When the bureau chiefs could not agree on how to do this, he replaced both chiefs in September 1939. The consolidation was finally effected by a law passed by Congress on 20 June 1940.

== History ==
The Bureau of Ships was initially organized in five divisions by 15 August 1940: Design, War Plans, Shipbuilding, Maintenance, and Administration. At the start it was tasked with implementing the massive Fiscal Year 1940 (FY40) naval procurement plan, which included 11 aircraft carriers, nine battleships, six large cruisers, 57 other cruisers, 95 destroyers, 73 submarines, and dozens of auxiliary vessels (most of the battleships and large cruisers were never completed). By late 1942 a reorganization subordinated Design as a branch of Shipbuilding, a Radio division (which included sonar) was created from the former Radio branch of the Design division, and Finance became a division. By mid-1945 the Radio division had become the Electronics division, and Shore and Contracts divisions had been added. The entry of the US into World War II on 7 December 1941 resulted in the FY42 procurement plan and its component war emergency programs, which dwarfed FY40 by projecting 20 aircraft carriers, 50 escort carriers, 35 cruisers, 144 destroyers, 750 destroyer escorts, 127 submarines, and many other ships. The escort carriers and destroyer escorts were ship types that had not been built before, and that many of the projected ships were cancelled in 1944–45. From its inception in 1940 BuShips supervised the building of a larger navy than any previous one in the space of five years. A media release on 22 May 1945 stated that 8 million tons of new ships costing 17 billion dollars (in 1945 money) had been built during the war, and a further 5 million tons of existing ships had been acquired or converted. On 7 December 1941 the total tonnage of the fleet was 2,680,000 tons. In numbers of ships, 7,695 vessels were on hand in December 1941, including landing craft. Over 100,000 vessels and landing craft were built during the war, including 1,150 combatants, 557 auxiliary ships, and 82,266 landing craft.

After 1947, BuShips purchased ships for the Departments of the Army and the Air Force, coordinated Department of Defense (DOD) shipbuilding activities, and coordinated navy repair and conversion programs with other federal agencies. By 1949 the Naval Reactors branch of BuShips had been established under Hyman G. Rickover, which resulted in the highly successful naval nuclear power program. By 1955 Naval Reactors had developed the first nuclear-powered submarine, followed by the first nuclear-powered ballistic missile submarine in 1960, with other BuShips branches responsible for the non-nuclear portions of those submarines. In the 1950s BuShips was responsible for procuring the first supercarriers such as the Forrestal class and developing new ship types to carry naval surface-to-air missiles, notably guided missile "frigates" (hull classification symbol DLG) such as the Farragut class. The Bureau established a formal program of value engineering (VE) in 1957, overseen by Lawrence D. Miles, an engineer who had launched VE at the General Electric Company in 1947, and Raymond Fountain, also from G.E.

In 1966 BuShips was succeeded by the Naval Ship Systems Command (NAVSHIPS), known as the Naval Sea Systems Command or NAVSEA since 1974.

== Chiefs of the Bureau ==
The following is a list of individuals who served as chief of the Bureau of Ships.

- Chief, Rear Admiral Samuel M. "Mike" Robinson, July 1940 – January 1942 (1st Chief Bureau of Ships)
  Deputy Chief, RAdm. Alexander H. Van Keuren
- Chief, Rear Admiral Alexander H. Van Keuren, January 1942 – November 1942
  Deputy Chief, RAdm. Claud Ashton Jones (Medal of Honor Recipient)
- Chief, Rear Admiral Edward L. "Ned" Cochrane, November 1942 – 1946
  Deputy Chief, RAdm. Earle W. Mills
- Chief, Rear Admiral Earle W. Mills, 1946–1949
- Chief, Rear Admiral David H. Clark, 1949–1951
- Chief, Rear Admiral Homer N. Wallin, February 1951 – August 1953
- Chief, Rear Admiral Wilson D. Leggett Jr., 1953–1955
- Chief, Rear Admiral Albert G. Mumma, 1955–1959
- Chief, Rear Admiral Ralph K. James, April 1959 – 1963
- Chief, Rear Admiral William A. Brockett, April 1963 – 1966

=== Naval Ship Systems Command ===
- Rear Admiral Edward J. Fahy, February 1966 – 1969
- Rear Admiral Nathan Sonenshein, July 1969 – 1972
- Rear Admiral Robert C. Gooding, July 1972 – 1974
