= USS S-43 =

Submarine of the United States

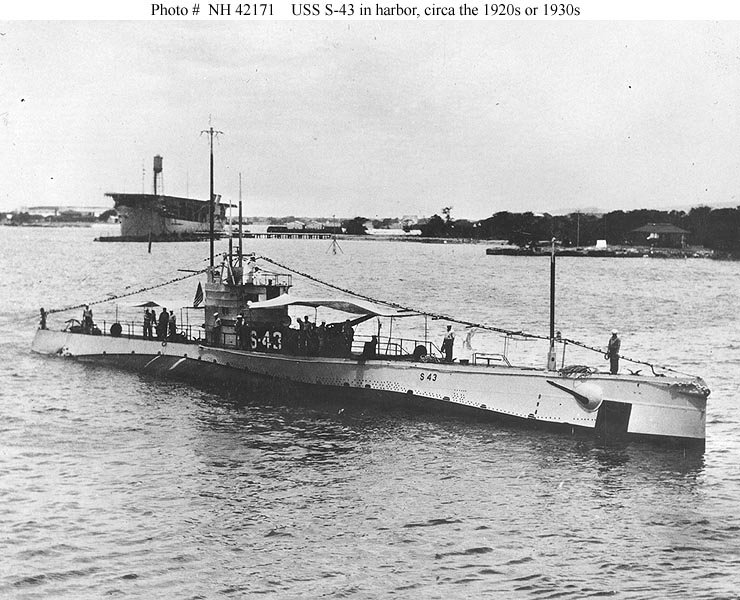
- USS S-43 at San Diego, California, with aircraft carrier USS Langley (CV-1) in the background, sometime between 1924 and 1936.

History

United States
- Name: USS S-43
- Builder: Bethlehem Shipbuilding Corporation, Quincy, Massachusetts
- Laid down: 13 December 1920
- Launched: 31 March 1923
- Sponsored by: Mrs. John H. Brown
- Commissioned: 31 December 1924
- Decommissioned: 10 October 1945
- Stricken: 13 November 1945
- Fate: Sold for scrap, 1946

General characteristics
- Class & type: S-class submarine
- Displacement: 850 long tons (864 t) surfaced; 1,126 long tons (1,144 t) submerged
- Length: 225 ft 3 in (68.66 m)
- Beam: 20 ft 8 in (6.30 m)
- Draft: 16 ft (4.9 m)
- Speed: 14.5 knots (16.7 mph; 26.9 km/h) surfaced; 11 knots (13 mph; 20 km/h) submerged
- Complement: 42 officers and men
- Armament: 1 × 4 in (102 mm)/50 deck gun; 4 × 21 inch (533 mm) torpedo tubes

Service record
- Operations: World War II

USS S-43 (SS-154) was a third-group (S-42) S-class submarine of the United States Navy.

== Construction and commissioning ==
S-43′s keel was laid down on 13 December 1920 by the Bethlehem Shipbuilding Corporation's Fore River Shipyard in Quincy, Massachusetts. She was launched on 31 March 1923, sponsored by Mrs. John H. Brown, and commissioned on 31 December 1924.

== Early years ==
Initially assigned to Submarine Division (SubDiv) 19 and then to SubDiv 11, S-43 completed trials off the Connecticut coast and, in April 1925, moved south to Guantanamo Bay. Thence, she proceeded to the Submarine Base, Coco Solo in the Panama Canal Zone, where she was based for the next two years. Engaged in exercises—individual, division, and fleet—during that period, she was transferred with her division to the Battle Force in July 1927 and based at San Diego, California. From there, she continued her schedule of exercises and fleet problems into the 1930s. Annual overhauls and exercises off southern California were followed by summer operations in Hawaiian waters and autumn patrols and exercises off Mexico.

December 1930, however, brought changes to her schedule. Then reassigned to Pearl Harbor, she operated almost exclusively in the Hawaiian area until 1941. Exceptions to these operations came with fleet problem deployment and inactive periods during her years, 1932 to 1935, in the rotating reserve.

In June 1941, the boats of SubDiv 11 were ordered to New London, Connecticut. There, the division was redesignated SubDiv 53, and the old S-boats were ordered, in groups, to Philadelphia, Pennsylvania, for overhaul and alterations to increase their reliability in case of war.

In August, S-43 put back to sea only to suffer a complete power failure which foreshadowed future breakdowns. In September, however, she assumed patrol and training duties out of Bermuda. At the end of October, she returned to southern New England for similar operations in the New London, Connecticut-Newport, Rhode Island area; and, in late November, she moved further north, to Newfoundland, to test the effects of weather there on the S-boats.

== World War II deployment ==
On 7 December, the United States entered World War II. The next day, S-43 departed the Canadian coast for New London and Coco Solo. On 27 December, she reached the Panama Canal Zone; and, on 9 January 1942, she transited the canal to conduct a security patrol in the Pacific approaches to that vital area. Returning to Coco Solo on 2 February, she prepared for transfer to the Australia-New Zealand area.

On 5 March, SubDiv 53, accompanied by submarine tender Griffin, got underway for Australia. In mid-April the S-boats completed their 12,000-mile voyage at Brisbane, Queensland, where they were joined by the Asiatic Fleet's S-boats to form TF 42.

== First war patrol ==
Upkeep followed, and, on 11 May, S-43 cleared Moreton Bay for her first war patrol. She ran submerged during daylight hours after passing 15 degrees south, despite her lack of air conditioning. She arrived in her patrol area, St. George's Channel between New Ireland and New Britain, on 21 May. On 24 May, her main engine air compressors broke down making both engines dependent on the ship's air banks. Two nights were spent removing and repairing the starboard air compressor. Her port air compressor remained out of commission. Leaks in sea valves; contaminated fuel oil; and a persistent fogging problem on the number-one periscope lens also plagued her for the remainder of the patrol. In early June 1942, The port engine clutch collapsed and became irreparable rendering the port engine unusable. The starboard engine threw a connecting rod on one of the pistons. Engine parts were thrown through the side of the engine. After three days and three nights the engines were still not operating. The Captain decided that if the crew was unable to get the engine running soon the only alternative would be to scuttle the submarine on a reef near Guadalcanal 54 miles away. The 55 crew members could then wade ashore with small arms. There was just enough power left in the batteries for this trip. Fortunately, the next day the machinist's mate notified the Captain that emergency repairs had been made, broken parts removed, and holes welded in the cylinder wall and the submarine would be able to return to port on 7 (of 8) cylinders. The S-43 was able to make port in Brisbane, Australia.

From 26 May to 1 June, S-43 ran submerged during the day to clear the area and lay to at night to charge her batteries. On 2 June, she surfaced and, operating on one engine, continued at one-third speed to Brisbane, where she arrived on 10 June.

== Second war patrol ==
After docking and refit, S-43 was again ordered out. On 8 July, she embarked Flight Officer C. F. Mason of the Royal Australian Air Force, liaison and rescue officer for friendly agents on New Ireland and Feni Island; then got underway for the Bismarck Archipelago. On 18 July, she arrived off New Ireland and, on the night of 19 July, put Mason ashore. Twenty-three hours later, she returned to pick him up. He had been unable to contact the agent to be taken off.

On the night of 21 July, S-43 surfaced off Feni and, at 1924, Mason went ashore to locate and bring off the agent there. At 19:20 on 22 July, the S-boat received a message from Mason to send in a boat; his had been punctured. Another inflatable boat was dispatched and returned within two hours, with Mason but without the agent. The following night, S-43 again surfaced near the Feni shore, and Mason returned to the island for the agent. On the night of 24 July, however, the S-boat received no answer to her signals. After numerous unsuccessful attempts to contact the liaison officer or the agent, S-43 began the voyage back and arrived at Brisbane on 7 August.

== Third war patrol ==
Main engine failures postponed S-43’s third patrol departure from 27 August to 14 September. Initially assigned to intercept Japanese shipping headed for Milne Bay by patrolling east of Kiriwina in the Trobriand Islands, she was soon shifted to the Buka Island area of the Solomon Islands. During the patrol, she sighted no worthwhile targets; and, on 14 October, she returned to Australia.

== Overhaul ==
The same month, SubDiv 53 was ordered back to Panama. Underway on 4 November, the boats, again accompanied by Griffin (AS-13), reached Coco Solo on 9 January 1943. There into the spring, S-43 proceeded to Cuba in early April; then retraced her route; transited the Panama Canal; and, on 26 April, arrived at San Diego, California, where she operated for the West Coast Sound School through the summer. In September, she commenced a five-month overhaul to prepare her for returning to the Solomons. Proceeding to Pearl Harbor in mid-February, she remained there through March for engine repairs; and, on 31 March, got underway again. Five days later, a crank case explosion in the starboard main engine forced her to put into Espiritu Santo for repairs. Finally, on 22 April, she arrived in Purvis Bay, whence she conducted antisubmarine warfare (ASW) training operations with Allied surface and air units. In January 1945, she returned to Australia, performed similar as operations through February; and, on 2 March, departed Australian waters for the last time. Heading for the American West Coast, she was fired on by an Allied merchant ship during poor weather on 18 March, but submerged before suffering any damage. On 5 April, she reached San Diego.

== Retirement ==
In late September, S-43 shifted to San Francisco, California, where she was decommissioned on 10 October 1945. A decommissioning ceremony with the crew was held on 22 October 1945.

Stripped the same month, her name was struck from the Naval Vessel Register on 13 November, and her hulk was sold for scrap to the Salco Iron and Metal Company in San Francisco the following year.

== Awards ==
- American Defense Service Medal with "A" device
- American Campaign Medal
- Asiatic-Pacific Campaign Medal
- World War II Victory Medal
