= Charles Manning Reed =

American politician

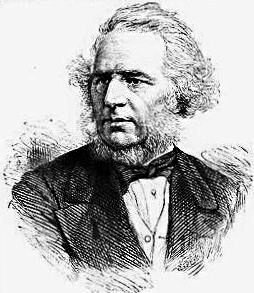
Portrait of Charles Manning Reed

Charles Manning Reed (April 3, 1803 – December 16, 1871) was a Whig member of the U.S. House of Representatives from Pennsylvania.

Charles M. Reed was born in Erie, Pennsylvania. He was the grandson of the first settler of Erie, Seth Reed. He attended the public schools and was graduated from Washington College in Washington, Pennsylvania. He studied law, was admitted to the bar in Philadelphia in 1824 but did not practice. He was engaged in business in Erie with his father, an owner of vessels on the Great Lakes. He was appointed colonel of militia in 1831 and brigadier general at the expiration of his commission. He was a member of the Pennsylvania House of Representatives in 1837 and 1838.

Reed was elected as a Whig to the Twenty-eighth Congress. He was an unsuccessful candidate for re-election in 1844. He resumed shipping on the Great Lakes and was also engaged in banking, mercantile pursuits, and the railroad business from 1846 to 1849. He died in 1871 in Erie, where he is interred in Erie Cemetery.

Reed's son, Charles M. Reed, Jr., served as mayor of Erie from 1872 to 1873. His election being shortly after Reed's death, one newspaper described the new mayor as the son of the late General Charles M. Reed.

== Sources ==
- United States Congress. "Charles Manning Reed (id: R000110)". Biographical Directory of the United States Congress.
- The Political Graveyard

U.S. House of Representatives
Preceded by William Jack	Member of the U.S. House of Representatives from Pennsylvania's 23rd congressional district 1843–1845	Succeeded by James Thompson
