= Nathan Sonenshein =

American Navy admiral (1915–2001)

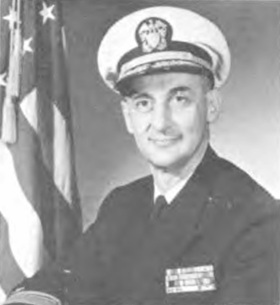
- Born: August 2, 1915; Lodi, New Jersey, U.S.
- Died: April 13, 2001 (aged 85); San Rafael, California, U.S.
- Burial place: Oakmont Cemetery, Lafayette, California
- Military career
- Allegiance: United States
- Branch: United States Navy
- Service years: 1938–1974
- Rank: Rear Admiral
- Commands: Naval Ship Systems Command
- Conflicts: World War II; Korean War
- Awards: Legion of Merit

Nathan Sonenshein (August 2, 1915 – April 13, 2001) was a rear admiral in the United States Navy. He served as commanding officer of the Naval Ship Systems Command from 1969 to 1972.

== Early life and education ==
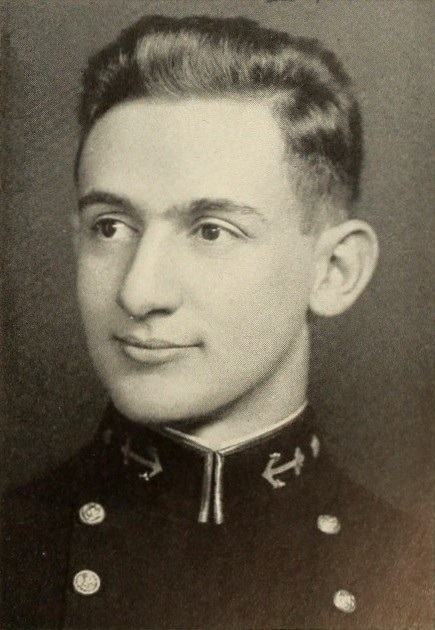
Sonenshein as a Naval Academy midshipman

Born in Lodi, New Jersey, Sonenshein moved with his family to Passaic, New Jersey, while he was in grade school. After graduating from Passaic High School in 1933, he began his four-decade naval career in 1934 by entering the United States Naval Academy, having received an appointment from U.S. Representative George N. Seger. On June 2, 1938, Sonenshein graduated with a B.S. degree and received his commission as an ensign.

After initial sea duty, Sonenshein took courses at the Naval Postgraduate School. He was sent to the Massachusetts Institute of Technology, where he completed an S.M. degree in naval construction in 1944. His thesis advisor was William M. Murray. Sonenshein would later attend the Advanced Management Program at the Harvard University Graduate School of Business in 1964.

== Career ==
After graduation from the Naval Academy in 1938, Sonenshein served on the pre-commissioning crew of the light cruiser Boise for two months. He was then transferred to the pre-commissioning crew of the light cruiser Phoenix. After her commissioning, Sonenshein served aboard the Phoenix from October 1938 to June 1941.

After earning his master's degree from MIT in 1944, Sonenshein reported to the Mare Island Naval Shipyard as an engineering duty officer. In August 1945, he was temporarily assigned to the Naval Technical Mission in Japan, where he helped to evaluate captured Japanese Imperial Navy technology. Sonenshein returned to the shipyard at Mare Island in November 1946 and served there until February 1949.

From 1949 to 1951, Sonenshein was director of the Naval Facilities Division at the Bureau of Ships in Washington, D.C. From 1951 to 1953, he served as an engineer officer aboard the carrier Philippine Sea and participated in combat operations during the Korean War. From September 1953 to June 1956, Sonenshein was Planning and Estimation Superintendent at the New York Naval Shipyard where he helped plan construction of the carriers Saratoga and Independence.

In July 1956, Sonenshein was promoted to captain and became head of the Hull Design Branch back at the Bureau of Ships. From 1960 to 1962, he served as Fleet and Force Maintenance Officer for the United States Pacific Fleet. In August 1962, Sonenshein became director of the Ship Design Division at the Bureau of Ships. Promoted to rear admiral in May 1965, he became assistant chief of the bureau for Design, Shipbuilding and Fleet Maintenance in June.

In November 1965, Sonenshein was reassigned as project officer for the Fast Deployment Logistics Ship Project. Although the project was discontinued before implementation in 1967, he was awarded the Legion of Merit for his efforts. From 1967 to 1969, Sonenshein served as Deputy Chief of Naval Material for Logistics Support.

In 1970, Sonenshein was head of the Navy's Bureau of Ships just before it became the Naval Ship Systems Command. After the Navy awarded the DX program to Litton-Ingalls shipyard, he told leaders of Bath Iron Works that he foresaw no future naval work going to the Maine shipyard. This spurred Bath to make a series of improvements that helped it win the contracts to design and build the first Oliver Hazard Perry frigates and Arleigh Burke destroyers. From 1972 to 1974, he served as head of the Shipbuilding Council for the Navy Material Command.

Sonenshein retired from the Navy in July 1974, and took up residence in Fairfax, Virginia. He moved to Moraga, California, less than a decade later and became assistant to the president of Global Marine Development, Inc. in Newport Beach, California. In 1982, he received the American Society of Naval Engineers' Harold E. Saunders Award, which honors "an individual whose reputation in naval engineering spans a long career of notable achievement and influence." In 1983, he was a member of the Marine Board of the Commission on Engineering and Technical Systems of the National Research Council. During his tenure, the board produced a report, "Criteria for the Depths of Dredged Navigational Channels".

On July 1, 1984, he was appointed by President Ronald Reagan to a two-year term as one of eight members of the National Advisory Committee on Oceans and Atmosphere. The Reagan Administration's choices for the panel membership drew criticism from environmentalists, who noted that it included no atmospheric scientists.

One of the committee's more controversial reports during his tenure suggested that U.S. shipyards be allowed to go out of business rather than be propped up by government subsidy. The report, released July 16, 1985, concluded that the country's shipyard capacity is "considerably greater" than would be required in a major conventional war. Using classified Pentagon studies, the report concluded that shipyards could expand production by 3½ to six times, providing all the new ships that would be needed. "Look at England in the Falklands", Sonenshein told the Washington Post. "In less than two months, they were able to modify and convert some 50 of their merchant ships that were then used for naval operations...Sure, it's always better to have more shipyards and more merchant ships to give you a margin of safety. But the hard question is, are you going to pay for it? I wouldn't pay for any more than we now have."

== Personal life ==
He was an uncle of political science professor Raphael Sonenshein and a brother of Israel L. Sonenshein, who was general counsel of the Federal Security Agency in Washington in the late 1940s and early 1950s and helped draft federal laws on Social Security and child support.

== Death ==
Sonenshein died at a Kaiser Permanente facility in San Rafael, California, aged 85. He was buried at Oakmont Cemetery in Lafayette, California.

== See also ==
- USNS Lynn
