= Andrew P. Forbeck =

United States Navy Medal of Honor recipient

Andrew Peter Forbeck
- Born: April 29, 1881; New York City, New York
- Died: April 24, 1924 (aged 42); Erie, Pennsylvania
- Burial place: Erie Cemetery Erie, Pennsylvania
- Military career
- Allegiance: United States of America
- Branch: United States Navy
- Rank: Seaman
- Unit: USS Pampanga (PG-39)
- Conflicts: Philippine–American War
- Awards: Medal of Honor

Andrew Peter Forbeck (April 29, 1881 – April 24, 1924) was a United States Navy seaman received the Medal of Honor for actions aboard USS Pampanga (PG-39) on July 16, 1900, during the Philippine American War. Seaman Forbeck is buried in Erie Cemetery, Erie, Pennsylvania.

He is buried in Erie Cemetery Erie, Pennsylvania.

== Medal of Honor citation ==
Rank and Organization: Seaman, U.S. Navy. Born: August 29, 18,9, New York. Accredited to: New York. G.O. No.: 55, July 19, 1901.

Citation:

For distinguished conduct in the presence of the enemy during the battle of Katbalogan, Samar, Philippine Islands, July 16, 1900.

== See also ==
- List of Medal of Honor recipients
- List of Philippine–American War Medal of Honor recipients
