= Webb Institute =

Private engineering college

Coordinates: 40°53′04″N 73°38′40″W

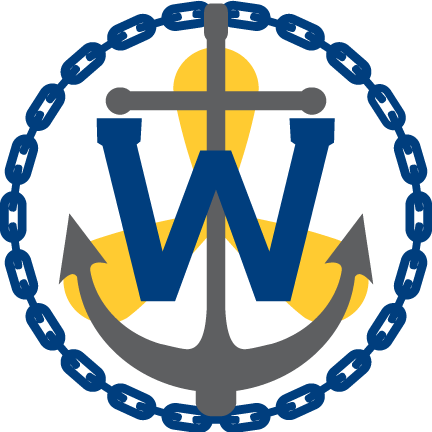
- Type: Private college
- Established: 1889; 137 years ago
- Accreditation: MSCHE
- Endowment: $80 million (2025)
- President: Mark Martecchini
- Academic staff: 11
- Undergraduates: 106 (2024–25)
- Location: Glen Cove, New York, United States
- Campus: 26 acres (11 ha); Suburban
- Nickname: Webbies
- Website: www.webb.edu

Webb Institute is a private college specialized in engineering and located in Glen Cove, New York, United States. Each graduate of Webb Institute earns a Bachelor of Science degree in naval architecture and marine engineering. The school is noted in the marine industry for its emphasis on ship design and systems engineering, its practical work experience, and its free tuition for domestic students.

== History ==
Webb Institute was founded in 1889 by industrialist and philanthropist William Henry Webb, who had established his career as a preeminent shipbuilder in the 19th century. He recognized the increasing role of science and engineering in the field of ship design, which had long been seen as more of an art form. Webb felt that the ship designers of the future would need to be skilled in structural and mechanical engineering and other scientific disciplines. The institute graduated its first class in 1893 and continues to educate students in naval architecture and marine engineering.

=== Founding and early history ===
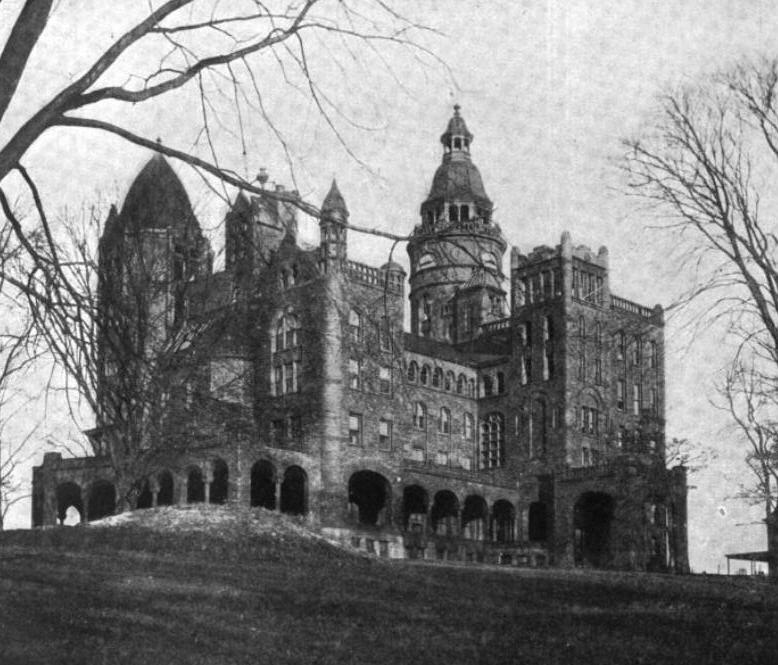
Webb's Academy and Home for Shipbuilders, Bronx, New York City (c. 1899)

On April 2, 1889, the state of New York incorporated Webb's Academy and Home for Shipbuilders as a non-profit institution. Webb had provided the academy with an endowment presumed to be sufficient to allow the institution to be self-supporting in perpetuity. It was intended to serve not only as an educational institution for future naval architects but also as a retirement home for aged shipbuilders.

Webb commissioned New York architect Arthur P. Jennings to design a building for the institution to be built on 14 acres (5.7 ha) of land on a bluff overlooking the Harlem and Hudson rivers in the Bronx. Construction commenced in 1890 and was completed in 1893. The building was designed in the Romanesque Revival style and was built of New York brownstone. It was intended to be "a romantic version of a medieval castle", with turrets, fanciful carving, and other flourishes. This facility was used for 50 years.

During World War II, the institute was closely associated with the U.S. Navy as a training center for naval officers.

=== Move and expansion ===
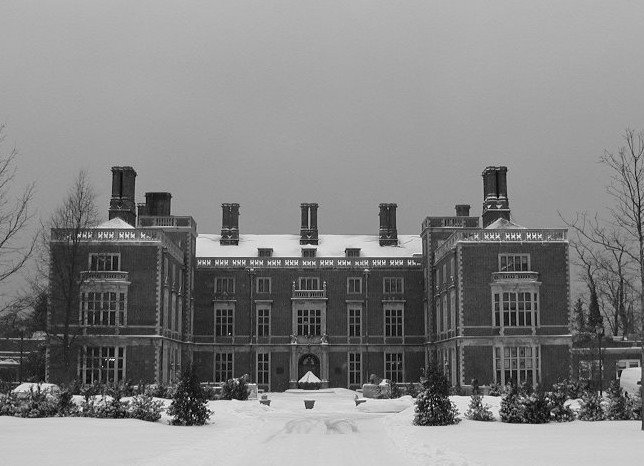
Stevenson Taylor Hall, Webb Institute, Glen Cove, New York (c. 2001). The site was used as a setting for Wayne Manor in two of the Batman films, the TV series Gotham and the Joker movie.

By 1945, the Board of Trustees determined that the Bronx campus was no longer suitable, lacking certain laboratory facilities, and ultimately sold it for a considerable sum. The site was redeveloped as the Fordham Hill Apartment complex.

In November 1945, the institute purchased its current home: The Braes, the former country estate of Herbert L. Pratt, in Glen Cove on the North Shore of Long Island. Designed by James Brite and constructed between 1912 and 1914, the main house had a distinct H-shaped layout and Jacobean, Tudor, and Renaissance-influenced design elements that made it distinct among Long Island estates of the era. It was the largest of the six Pratt estates in Glen Cove. Also on the property, a remaining wing from Pratt's previous house, Dosoris, (which was mostly demolished when The Braes was constructed) was present. Conversion work began in 1946.

In April 1947, classes began at the new campus in Glen Cove. The main building had been renovated to include classrooms, dormitories, and offices. A model basin and gymnasium were constructed elsewhere on the campus. The main building was renamed Stevenson Taylor Hall in honor of the charter member and president of the Board of Trustees (1900–1926) of the institute. Through the conversion, the ground floor of Stevenson Taylor Hall retained much of the original 1915-era decor.

A modern library and auditorium were added to the campus in 1971. Webb first admitted women as students in 1974.

Webb Institute was used for the exterior shots of Wayne Manor in the 1995 film Batman Forever, again in the 1997 film Batman & Robin, and for interior and exterior shots for the 2014 TV series Gotham. The Webb Institute reprised its earlier film role as Wayne Manor for the 2019 film Joker. It was also featured in the 1998 film Great Expectations. Interior and exterior shots appeared in the 2015 TV series Limitless in Season 1, Episode 14.

=== Administrators ===
There have been 18 administrators of the institute:

Administrator	Function	Years
Andrew Reed	Resident Manager	1894 – 1902
J. Irvin Chaffee	Assistant Resident Manager	1899 – 1902
	Resident Manager & Dean	1902 – 1919
George F. Crouch	Resident Manager & Dean	1920 – 1923
James O. Pollion	Assistant Resident Manager	1921 – 1922
Frank L. Odell	Resident Manager	1923 – 1926
Gilbert P. Taylor	Non-resident Manager	1926 – 1932
George H. Rock, RADM. USN (Ret)	Administrator	1932 – 1945
Samuel M. Robinson, D.S., D.E., P.E., ADM. USN (Ret)	Administrator	1946 – 1951
Frederick E. Haeberle, P.E., RADM. USN (Ret)	Administrator	1951 – 1961
William T. Alexander, D.Eng. (Hon), P.E.	President	1961 – 1966
William A. Brockett, P.E., RADM. USN (Ret)	President	1966 – 1974
Charles N. Payne, RADM. USN (Ret)	President	1974 – 1980
C. Russell Bryan, VADM. USN (Ret)	President	1980 – 1986
Benedict L. Stabile, VADM. USCG (Ret)	President	1986 – 1990
James J. Conti, B.Ch.E, M.Ch.E, D.Ch.E.	President	1990 – 1999
Ronald K. Kiss, P.E.	President	1999 – 2005
Robert C. Olsen Jr., RADM. USCG (Ret)	President	2005 – 2013
R. Keith Michel	President	2013 – 2022
Mark Martecchini	President	2022 – present

== Academics ==
The student body of Webb Institute typically numbers around 90, with 20% being female. Webb currently has 12 full-time faculty members and no teaching assistants. Students have high access to professors, who routinely make themselves available at most hours. Adjunct faculty from local colleges teach some humanities courses at Webb such as Political Philosophy and Japanese.

There are four classrooms, one for each class. The school is atypical as the professors, rather than students, rotate to each classroom because of its small size. The front portion of the classroom is dedicated to lecture hours, while the rear has rows of drafting tables, one for each student, along with bookshelves and couches for 24-7 personalized study space.

The centerpiece of Webb's academic facilities is the 90-foot (27 m)-long model ship model basin, which is frequently used by students and faculty alike for experiments and research. Webb Institute has its own physics and chemistry laboratories, an extensive library, an engineering lab for mechanical and electrical experiments, a carpentry shop, and a machine shop. Students have limited around-the-clock access to these facilities. There is an emphasis throughout Webb's academic program on hands-on experience, and several classes require conducting experiments or building and testing models.

Webb Institute's coursework is intense. Students spend up to 5 hours per day in lecture and can spend several hours per day working outside of class. During the mandatory internship period from January through February each year, students seek positions in the maritime industry, including shipyards, design offices, and aboard merchant vessels. All seniors are required to complete a senior thesis. Seniors are strongly encouraged to take the Fundamentals of Engineering exam, in which they usually perform exceptionally well.

88% of incoming students make it to graduation. Many graduates establish careers in the maritime industry, with 100% job placement. Graduates also forge careers in other engineering fields or find success in finance or law. About a third of each graduating class goes on to pursue an advanced degree. Webb has an active alumni association which supports graduates, fosters a thriving social network, and maintains an alumni fund. The alumni giving rate is over 70%, one of the highest rates in the United States.

Because of the founder's endowment and the high alumni giving rate, students who are U.S. citizens are not charged tuition at Webb. Students pay for room and board, books, and fees. The Bachelor of Science degree is awarded after four years of "total immersion" study, which includes several months of job experience through internship periods.

The institute maintains close relationships with the nearby United States Merchant Marine Academy and State University of New York Maritime College, along with Cooper Union.

=== Winter Work ===
Winter Work is Webb Institute's term for its unique internship periods. Webb students are required to work in certain areas of the marine industry for 8 weeks during the months of January and February. Freshmen act as apprentices/mechanics in shipyards or boatyards, and sophomores as cadets/observers at sea. Juniors and seniors perform internships in various engineering firms and design offices. By the time students graduate, they have 8 months of work experience. Recently, Winter Work has become increasingly more global, with several students traveling overseas to China, the Netherlands, Denmark, Greece, and the United Arab Emirates.

=== Accreditation ===
Webb Institute is accredited by the Middle States Commission on Higher Education. The Naval Architecture and Marine Engineering program is accredited by the Engineering Accreditation Commission of ABET.

== Culture ==
Students are required to live on campus for all four years. Webb Institute has no fraternities or sororities. There is a student-run Social Committee at Webb that holds several parties throughout the year. The Social Committee also organizes off-campus trips throughout the year.

The student body adheres to an Honor Code, which prohibits lying, cheating, and stealing. The Student Organization administers the Honor Code, operates the student treasury, oversees social activities, and serves as liaison between students and the school administration.

The school has its own yacht club, automotive workshop, and English pub. Intercollegiate sports include sailing, tennis, soccer, volleyball, ultimate, and basketball. New York City is an hour away by the Long Island Rail Road. There are many student-led activity clubs on campus as well, both sporting and intellectual.

Webb won the 2018 HVIAC men's tennis championship. This is the first championship Webb sports has won in recent history.

== Athletics ==
The Webb athletic teams are called the Webbies. The institute is a member of the United States Collegiate Athletic Association (USCAA) as an Independent, for most of its sports since the 2023–24 academic year; while its sailing team competes in the Middle Atlantic Intercollegiate Sailing Association (MAISA). The Webbies previously competed in the Hudson Valley Intercollegiate Athletic Conference (HVIAC) for most of its sports from 2004–05 to 2023–23.

Webb competes in five intercollegiate varsity sports. Men's sports include basketball, sailing, soccer, tennis and volleyball.

== Notable alumni ==
- Bill Langan, yacht designer
- Norman B. Hall, US Coast Guard rear admiral
- Halsey Chase Herreshoff, yacht designer
- David M. Young Jr., mathematician
- Lloyd M. Trefethen, inventor and fluid mechanics researcher
- Alfred Zeien, Gillette CEO
