= Ralph K. James =

United States Navy admiral (1906–1994)

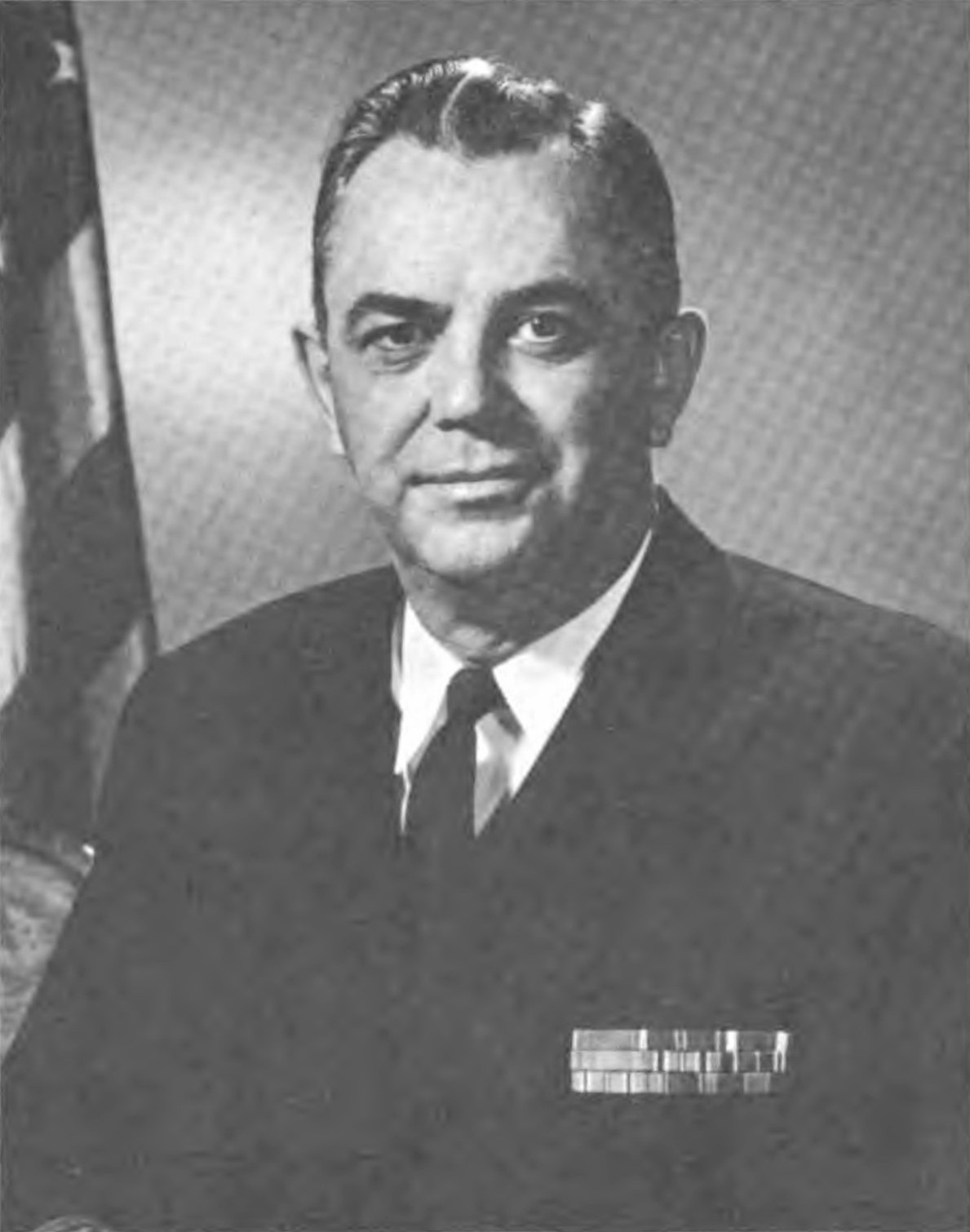
- Rear Admiral Ralph K. James in 1963
- Born: May 21, 1906; Chicago, Illinois, US
- Died: March 31, 1994 (aged 87); Annapolis, Maryland, US
- Military career
- Allegiance: United States
- Branch: United States Navy
- Service years: 1928–1963
- Rank: Rear Admiral
- Commands: Bureau of Ships; Long Beach Naval Shipyard
- Conflicts: World War II
- Awards: Distinguished Service Medal; Legion of Merit; Bronze Star Medal

Signature
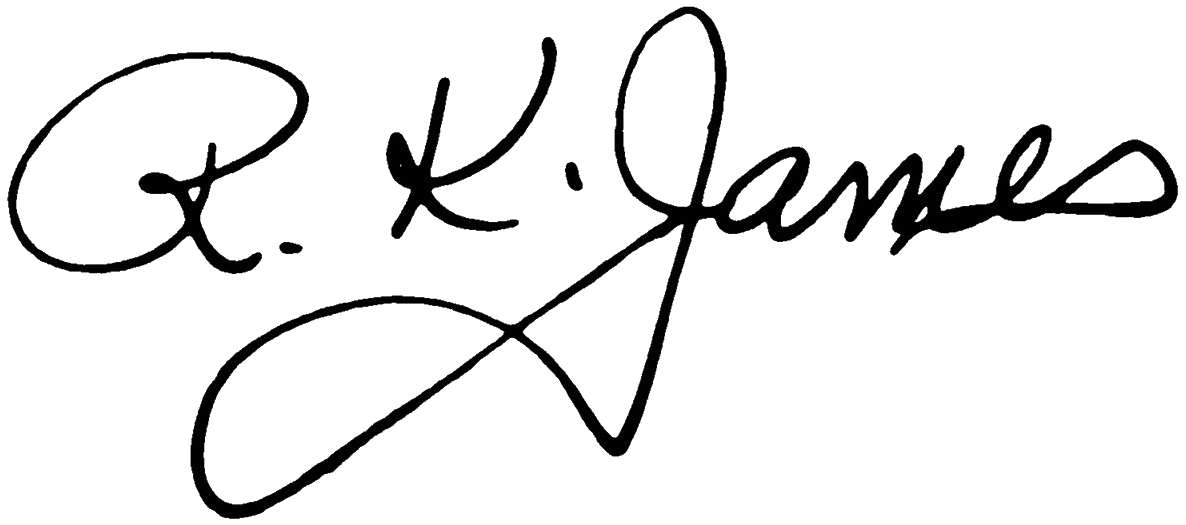

Ralph Kirk James (May 21, 1906 – March 31, 1994) was a Captain in the United States Navy during World War II. He retired in June 1963 as a Rear Admiral.

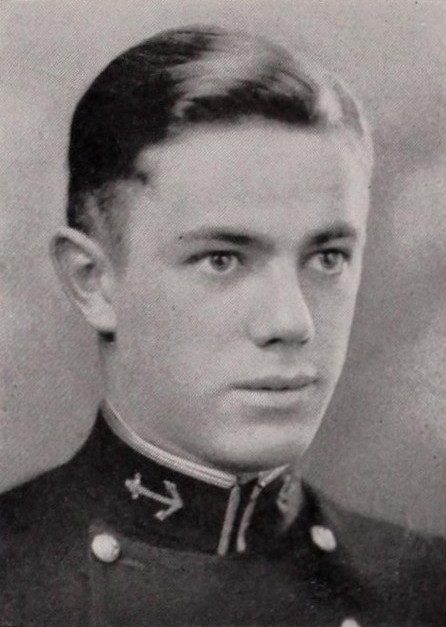
Ralph James as a Naval Academy midshipman

Born and raised in Chicago, Illinois, James entered the United States Naval Academy in 1924. While there, he played lacrosse and served as secretary-treasurer of the Class of 1928 and editor-in-chief of the yearbook. James graduated eighth in his class on June 7, 1928. He received additional training at the Naval Postgraduate School. In 1933, he graduated from the Massachusetts Institute of Technology with an S.M. degree in naval construction.

James served in the Navy housing constructors, then the Puget Sound Naval Shipyard, the destroyer tender USS Whitney in the composition of the Pacific Fleet and the Bureau of Ships. In 1942, he became a member of a diplomatic mission of Admiral William Glassford authorities of French West Africa, also accompanied him on the Casablanca Conference. In 1943, he took part in the hostilities on the Pacific Ocean, first as an officer responsible for coordinating repair units in the waters of the southern Pacific with headquarters at Espiritu Santo, then as commander of Service Squadron 10 on the island of Manus.

After the end of the war, he worked as a controller in the Bureau of Ships and commander of the Long Beach Naval Shipyard. In 1956, he promoted to rear admiral. In April 1959, he became chief of the Bureau of Ships and served until retirement in June 1963. He remained an active retired engineer, attended among others in the drafting of the first American hovercraft.

James died on March 31, 1994 in Annapolis, Maryland of pneumonia. He was interred at the United States Naval Academy Cemetery.

== Awards ==
- Navy Distinguished Service Medal in August 1963 as Rear Admiral
- Legion of Merit in September 1948 as Captain
- Bronze Star Medal
