= List of people from Erie, Pennsylvania =

The following is a list of notable persons who were born, or who have lived a significant part of their lives, in Erie, Pennsylvania.

== Art and literature ==
- Richard Anuszkiewicz, founder and foremost artist of Op Art movement
- Moses Billings, early American portrait painter
- Marc Brown, children's book author and illustrator, creator of the Arthur book series
- John Silk Deckard, painter, printmaker, sculptor
- David Greenberger, artist
- Thom Hatch, author and novelist who specializes in the history of the American West, the American Civil War, and the Plains Indian Wars
- Eugene Iverd, illustrator and teacher
- Ron Larson, author of several dozen mathematics textbooks
- Leon Ray Livingston, known as "King of the Hobos"
- Ruth Eleanor Newton, illustrator and designer
- Joseph Plavcan, painter and teacher
- Chuck Rosenthal, author
- Belle Silveira, artist known for her pencil portraits
- Ida M. Tarbell, author, journalist, "muckraker"
- John Totleben, comic book illustrator, known for covers of DC Comics' Swamp Thing
- Michael J. Varhola, author
- Charles Erskine Scott Wood, author and leading civil liberties advocate, best known for "Heavenly Discourse"

== Athletics ==
- Sig Andrusking, professional football player
- Art Baker, professional football player, Buffalo Bills, All-American and NCAA National Championship winner in both football and wrestling, pioneering African-American athlete
- Bruce Baumgartner, heavyweight Olympic wrestler, most decorated American wrestler of all time, member of National Wrestling Hall of Fame
- Dana Bible, former American football coach
- Lou Bierbauer, 19th-century Major League Baseball player
- Fred Biletnikoff, professional football player, Oakland Raiders, Super Bowl MVP, Pro Football Hall of Fame
- James Carr, youngest-ever American Olympic wrestler, member of National Wrestling Hall of Fame
- Nate Carr, Olympic wrestler (bronze medalist in 1988), three-time NCAA champion at Iowa State University, member of National Wrestling Hall of Fame
- Rick Chartraw, professional ice hockey player, Montreal Canadiens
- James Conner, professional football player, Arizona Cardinals
- Toby Crabel, hedge fund manager and tennis player
- Clifton Crosby, professional football player, Indianapolis Colts
- Ed Cushman, professional baseball player, Buffalo Bisons, Milwaukee Brewers, Philadelphia Athletics, New York Metropolitans, Pittsburgh Pirates, and Toledo Maumees
- Dell Darling, professional baseball player, Buffalo Bisons, Chicago White Stockings, and St. Louis Browns
- Don Elbaum, boxer and boxing promoter
- Tim Federowicz, professional baseball player, Los Angeles Dodgers
- Bill Finneran, early professional baseball umpire
- George Flint, professional football player, Buffalo Bills
- Fernando Frye, college football player
- Eric Hicks, professional football player, Kansas City Chiefs
- Essie Hollis, professional basketball player, Detroit Pistons
- Sam Jethroe, Negro leagues and Major League baseball player from 1938 to 1966
- Jovon Johnson, professional football player, Ottawa Redblacks, CFL's Most Outstanding Defensive Player Award
- Caryn Kadavy, figure skater, 1987 world bronze medalist, 1988 Olympian
- Eddie Klep, professional baseball player, first white American to play in the Negro leagues
- Jack Laraway, professional football player, Buffalo Bills, Houston Oilers
- Tom Lawless, professional baseball player and coach, St. Louis Cardinals, Toronto Blue Jays, and Montreal Expos
- Bob Learn, Jr., professional bowler, 1999 U.S. Open champion who also rolled the PBA's 10th televised 300 game
- Frank Liebel, professional football defensive back for NFL's New York Giants and Chicago Bears
- Matt Lynch, as of 2024 the only out gay head coach in college men's basketball
- Isaac Mattson, professional baseball player, Pittsburgh Pirates
- Kayla McBride, professional basketball player, Minnesota Lynx, first-team All-American, Notre Dame
- Mike McCoy, professional football player, Green Bay Packers, unanimous first-team All-American for Notre Dame and 1969 Heisman Trophy candidate
- Curt Miller, WNBA professional basketball coach
- Brian Milne, professional football player, Indianapolis Colts, Cincinnati Bengals, Seattle Seahawks, New Orleans Saints and Atlanta Falcons
- Mike Morrison, professional baseball player, Cleveland Spiders, Syracuse Stars and Baltimore Orioles
- Peter Nyari, professional baseball and Olympic athlete
- Bob Raudman, professional baseball player
- Bob Sanders, professional football player, Indianapolis Colts
- Brian Stablein, professional football player, Indianapolis Colts and Detroit Lions
- Mark Stepnoski, professional football player, Dallas Cowboys and Houston/Tennessee Oilers
- Woody Thompson, professional football player, Atlanta Falcons
- Blidi Wreh-Wilson, professional football player, Tennessee Titans and Atlanta Falcons
- Ryan Zapolski, professional hockey player, U.S. men’s hockey Olympic goaltender

== Business and politics ==
- Edward M. Baker, investment broker
- Henry Alden Clark, U.S. congressman
- Judah Colt, pioneer
- Toby Crabel, hedge fund manager and tennis player
- Kathy Dahlkemper, U.S. congresswoman and Erie County executive
- Samuel A. Davenport, U.S. congressman
- Daniel Dobbins, builder of the U.S. naval fleet for Battle of Lake Erie
- Thomas B. Hagen, chairman of Erie Insurance
- William A. Heidt, former U.S. ambassador to Cambodia (2015-2018)
- William Himrod, iron industry pioneer and abolitionist
- Warren Kitzmiller, Vermont state legislator
- Michael Liebel, Jr., mayor of Erie 1906–1911; Democratic member of the United States House of Representatives from Pennsylvania 1915–1917
- Reinhard Liebel, president of South Erie Iron Works; member of the Board of Fire Commissioners, Common Council and Select Council of Erie
- Harry Markopolos, blew whistle in Madoff securities fraud
- Norman Morrison, Vietnam protester who self-immolated
- Joseph D. Pistone, aka Donnie Brasco, FBI agent who infiltrated Bonanno crime family
- Adena Miller Rich, suffragist, social worker in Chicago, director of Immigrants' Protective League
- Tom Ridge, secretary of the U.S. Department of Homeland Security, governor of Pennsylvania, and U.S. congressman
- James Patrick Rossiter, lawyer and politician
- William Lawrence Scott, 19th-century politician and wealthy businessman
- Milton Shreve, U.S. congressman
- Thomas Sill, U.S. congressman

== Film, stage, and television ==
- Nick Adams, Broadway actor
- Billy Blanks, inventor of Taebo and martial arts film actor
- Marc Blucas, actor
- Marilyn Burns, actress, known for role as Sally in 1974 movie The Texas Chain Saw Massacre
- Bob Chitester, public television and documentary film producer, known as "the man who made Milton Friedman a star"
- Julie Craig, actress and singer
- Ann B. Davis, actress, known for role as Alice on TV's Brady Bunch
- Dorothy Dietrich, magician and escapologist
- Kurt Doss, child actor
- Christine Estabrook, television and film actress
- Ish Kabibble, comedian and actor
- Harry Kellar, magician
- Tina LeBlanc, ballet dancer, teacher and ballet master
- Emily Matson, journalist
- Julianna McCarthy, original cast member of The Young and the Restless
- Dan Rice, 19th-century entertainer and clown
- Blake Roman, actor
- Maria Sansone, television host of Good Day LA
- Walker Scobell, actor
- Steve Scully, host, political editor, and senior producer of C-SPAN's Washington Journal
- Jonathan Stark, actor and screenwriter
- Denman Thompson, playwright and actor
- Alaska Thunderfuck, drag queen and winner of RuPaul's Drag Race All Stars season 2
- Kay Williams, actress

== Military and aerospace ==
- John Boyd, fighter pilot and military strategist who developed the OODA Loop and helped with the success of the Persian Gulf War
- Paul K. Carlton, general United States Air Force; commander in chief of the Military Airlift Command
- Philip Cochran, colonel in United States Army Air Corps; commander of the 1st Air Commando Group in World War II; inspiration for the characters "Flip Corkin" and "General Philerie" in comic strips by Milton Caniff
- Charles A. Curtze, rear admiral, United States Navy
- Richard E. Ellsworth, U.S. Air Force brigadier general
- Charles Vernon Gridley, U.S. Navy commander, captain, U.S.S. Olympia, Battle of Manila Bay; adopted Erie as his home after taking command of the USS Michigan there
- Louis J. Magill, Spanish–American War veteran; recipient of the Marine Corps Brevet Medal
- Seth Reed, lt. colonel, fought at Bunker Hill; instrumental in adding "E Pluribus Unum" to U.S. coins; founded Erie, as its first settler with his family, in 1795, at Presque Isle
- Strong Vincent, Union brigadier general; killed at Gettysburg; Harvard graduate; practiced law in Erie from Waterford, Erie County
- Anthony Wayne, American Revolutionary War general
- Paul J. Weitz, U.S. naval aviator, NASA astronaut, Skylab 2 pilot, STS-6 (Shuttle Challenger) commander
- William Maxwell Wood, first surgeon general of the US Navy

== Music ==
- Alan Baer, tuba player, New York Philharmonic
- Harry Burleigh, classical music composer
- Marion Davison Duffie (1896–1965), singer and voice teacher
- Walter Hendl, conductor, composer and pianist
- Peter Mennin, composer and teacher
- Patrick Monahan, lead singer of Train; solo artist; Grammy Award winner
- Art Phillips, composer
- Jack Stauber, solo musician and songwriter
- Chris Vrenna, drummer of rock band Nine Inch Nails
- War of Ages, Christian metal band

== Naturalists ==
- Joe Root, 19th-century naturalist who lived at Presque Isle State Park

== Religion ==
- Joan Chittister, Benedictine nun, author, and lecturer
- Max C. Currick, Reform rabbi
- John Mark Gannon, Catholic archbishop
- Theodore Jurewicz, Russian Orthodox priest and Byzantine iconographer
- Mary Lou Kownacki, Benedictine nun, activist, and writer

== Science, medicine, and academia ==
- Richard Beals, Yale professor and author of several mathematical textbooks
- David Dausey, professor, author and epidemiologist
- Millicent Goldschmidt, microbiologist, professor emerita at University of Texas
- John Kanzius, inventor; radio and TV engineer and executive
- Tara Keck, professor at University College London, published numerous scholarly articles on neuroplasticity
- Paul Siple, Antarctic explorer who developed the wind chill factor
- Chester L. Sutula, chemist
