= Lovisa Card-Catlin =

Lovisa O. Card-Catlin
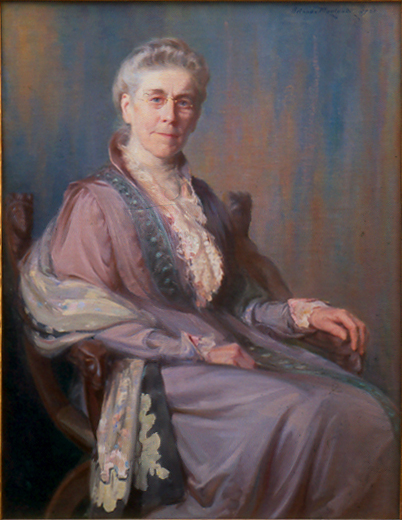
- Orlando Rouland portrait of Lovisa Card-Catlin, 1922
- Born: 1846; Gainesville, New York
- Died: 1925 (aged 78–79); Erie, Pennsylvania

Lovisa O. Card-Catlin (August 5, 1846 – December 7, 1925) was an American artist and educator credited with developing Erie, Pennsylvania's art community.

== Early life and career ==
Lovisa Card was born in Gainesville, New York to William Merritt and Eliza Wheel Card. Though not much is known about her early life, it is generally accepted she left home at the age of sixteen. By 1868, she had taken up residence with an aunt and uncle, Jehiel and Hannah Towner, in Erie, Pennsylvania. Lovisa opened a small art studio in the family home before opening the Erie Art School in the 1870s. Located on the second floor of the Erie Dime Saving and Loan Building, the school was the first of its kind in the city and came to include nearly one hundred students. In her classes Lovisa stressed realism, teaching students to use their tools in order to enhance their own innate abilities. Her students included Ruth E. Newton, Ruth Halleck, Gretchen Newberger, Charles A. Hulbert, Elizabeth Spalding, and Inez Wagner. During this time, she also studied at the Art Students League of New York, later becoming a life member. After the death of her mother and aunt, it is likely Lovisa took a break from teaching and the Erie Dime Saving and Loan Building was closed. By 1893, Lovisa married the widower Henry Catlin, a noted abolitionist and man of culture who was previously married to her cousin, Ellen Towner. The couple relocated and Lovisa returned to teaching, opening the Catlin School of Art in her home studio.

== Art Club ==
In 1898, nineteen members of the community, many of them Lovisa's former students, came together in the Catlin home to establish Erie's first Art Club; an institution that would form the foundations for the Erie Art Museum. The club's self-declared mission was: "The advancement of art by the elevation of its standards, by encouraging every form of art enterprise, by creating a more intelligent appreciation of art products, and by the cultivation of a spirit of fraternity among art students." Lovisa was elected the club's first president, a position which she held until 1922. The Art Club met in the classrooms of Erie Academy until the Public Library building opened in 1899. The club's first exhibition featured 321 works from local artists. They also sponsored outside exhibitions of noteworthy American artists. Paintings hung for one month and exhibitions were free to the public. With each show, the Art Club would purchase one or more works for its permanent collection. One of the first purchases included work from H. Bolton Jones and F. S. Church.

== Later life ==
On June 19, 1903, Henry Catlin died at home after he was stricken with a bout of rheumatism. With his passing, Lovisa focused her attention on bringing art programming to Erie, raising membership, and building the club's permanent collection. After her brother also died, Lovisa spent two years traveling in Europe where she studied with Henri Martin and attended classes at The Academie Colarossi and The Académie de la Grande Chaumière. Coincidentally, Lovisa was among the visitors at The Louvre on the day Leonardo da Vinci’s Mona Lisa was stolen. Upon her return to Erie, Lovisa was awarded honorary membership to the Woman's Club of Erie. She was also posthumously named one of the twelve greatest women in Erie history by the Business and Professional Women's Club in 1931. Well into her seventies, Lovisa continued to build exhibitions with the Art Club. In 1923, she helped institute the Art Club's first regular exhibition of local artists This exhibition continues today as the Annual Spring Show at the Erie Art Museum.

== Scholarship Fund ==
Lovisa died at her home on December 7, 1925. She and Henry had no children. As part of her will, the Card-Catlin Art Scholarship was created for the continuing education of fine art, industrial arts, and architecture students. Noteworthy winners include Erie artists Joseph Plavcan and Richard Anuszkiewicz. Today the scholarship continues to support students of the arts through the Erie Community Foundation.
