= Deckard =

Deckard may refer to:

== Surname ==
- Historical:
  - Carl R. Deckard (1961–2019), American engineer
  - H. Joel Deckard (1942–2016), American politician
  - John Silk Deckard (1938–1994), American printmaker and sculptor
  - Ruth Deckard (fl. 1930s-1950s), American pin-up artist
  - Tom Deckard (1916–1982), American runner
- Rick Deckard, fictional character of both prose Do Androids Dream of Electric Sheep?, and several Blade Runner works

== Given name ==
- Deckard Cain, a fictional character in the Diablo series and Heroes of the Storm
- Deckard Shaw, a fictional character in The Fast and the Furious franchise

== Other ==
- Deckard (band), Scottish rock band, also known as Baby Chaos
- Steam Frame, a virtual reality headset, also known by its codename "Deckard"
