= Thomas Hagen =

Thomas or Tom Hagen may refer to:

- Thomas Hagen (politician) (1919–1985), New Caledonian politician
- Thomas B. Hagen (born 1935/36), American billionaire businessman
- Tom Hagen, a fictional character in The Godfather
- Tom Hagen (businessman) (born 1950), Norwegian businessman
- Tom Harald Hagen (born 1978), Norwegian football referee

== See also ==
- Thomas Hagan (born 1941), assassin of Malcolm X
- Tom Hagan (born 1947), American basketball player
