= Sister Study =

The Sister Study
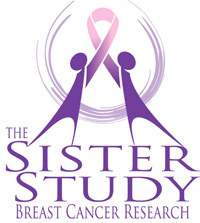
- Funding agency: NIEHS, United States Department of Health and Human Services
- Participants: 50,000 Women ages 35 to 74 whose sisters had breast cancer
- Duration: 2003 –
- Website: sisterstudy.niehs.nih.gov/English/index1.htm

The Sister Study is a nationwide effort, conducted by the National Institute of Environmental Health Sciences (NIEHS), part of the National Institutes of Health of the U.S. Department of Health and Human Services to learn how the environment and genes may affect the chances of getting breast cancer. Over 10 years, the study followed 50,000 sisters of women who have had breast cancer in hopes of finding the environmental and genetic causes of the disease. As of 2024, the study is the largest and longest of its kind to examine breast cancer risk factors.

Sister Study participants were women ages 35 to 74. Women were eligible to participate if their sister (living or deceased), related to them by blood, had breast cancer; they had never had breast cancer themselves, and they lived in the United States or Puerto Rico. The Sister Study was available in English and Spanish. Recruitment for the study began in 2004 and closed in 2009.

The principal investigators for the study are Dale Sandler and Clarice Weinberg and the study was overseen by Marian Johnson-Thompson. Organizations in partnership with the Sister Study included the American Cancer Society, the Intercultural Cancer Council, the National Center on Minority Health and Health Disparities of the National Institutes of Health, Sisters Network Inc., Y-ME National Breast Cancer Organization, Susan G. Komen for the Cure, and Breast Cancer Network of Strength.

== Beginnings and objectives ==
Since its beginning in 2003, the Sister Study has incorporated more than 55,000 women whose sisters have had breast cancer. Women of all backgrounds and ethnicities have been included in the study for a broader representation of women's health. The study includes sisters because they are often more likely to continue participating because a family member experienced the disease. Using sisters as subjects also provides a higher chance of identifying the potential risk factors because of their shared environment, genetics, and experiences.

In the 1980s and 1990s, advocacy groups began raising concerns about the rising breast cancer rates in the U.S. In 1990, an estimated 500,000 women would die in the U.S. from cervical and breast cancers. Many advocacy groups called for more studies on breast cancer to improve women’s health, as existing research primarily focused on hormones, lifestyle, and reproduction. In response to these concerns, the NIEHS researchers proposed the idea of the Sister Study. The common features shared between sisters, including genes and early-life environments, provided insights into how genes and environments affect the risk of developing breast cancer associated with these factors. It was supported by study data that these features make women whose sisters had breast cancer twice as likely to develop the disease themselves. The study began by considering the endocrine-disrupting chemical exposures that were of concern to breast cancer advocates, but the researchers wanted to address a range of individual and community-level stressors, such as air pollution and lifestyle factors. The researchers also aimed to include broader public health concerns such as psychological stress, sleep patterns, diet, and socioeconomic and neighborhood factors. Additionally, the researchers aimed to address the research gaps about the impact of exposures in early life—in utero environments to childhood and adolescent experience—on the individual's long-term health.

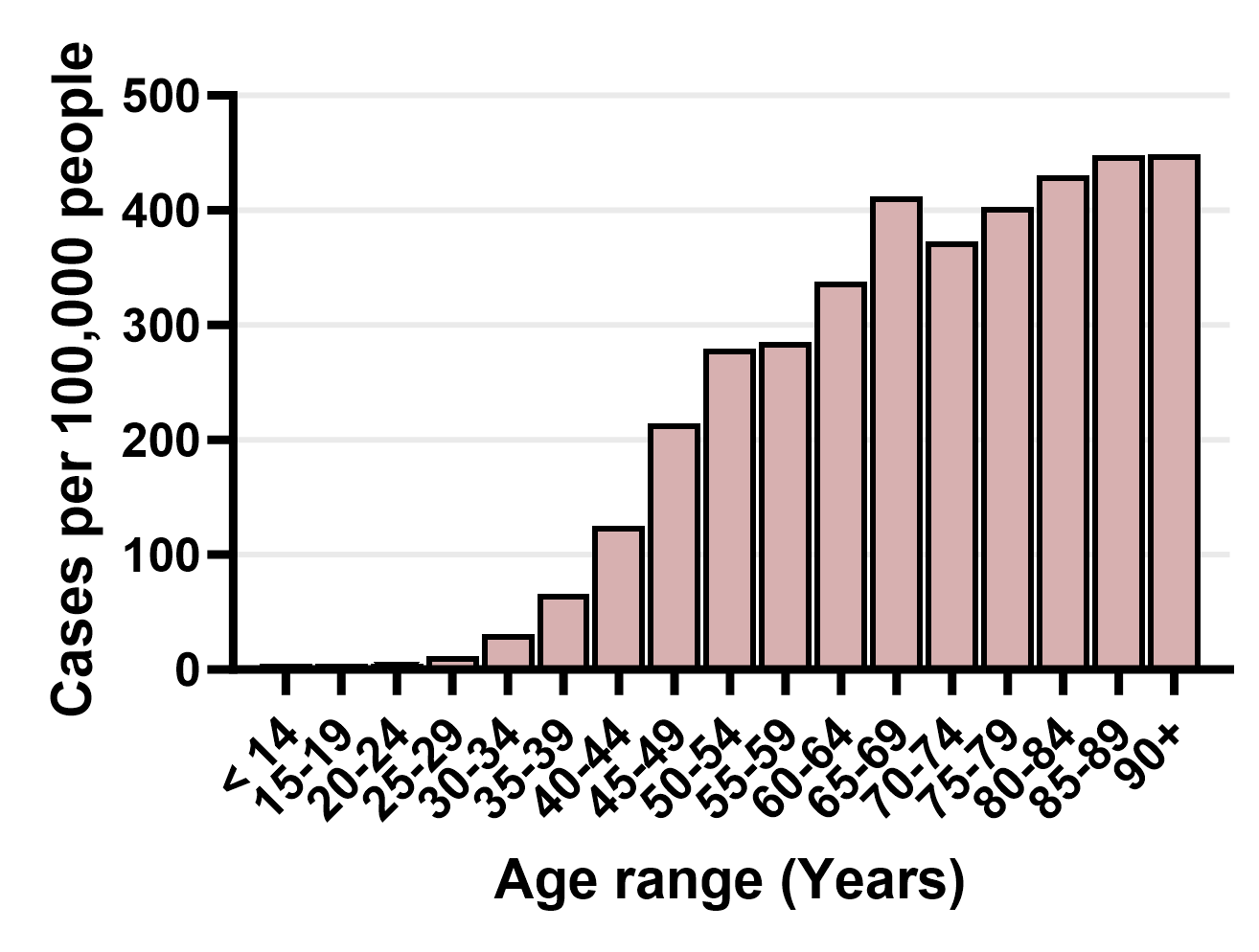
Graph showing breast cancer incidence by age group among UK women. Data from Cancer Research UK. [1]

The first participant was enrolled 20 years ago, in the fall of 2003, and by the spring of 2009, the study surpassed its goal of 50,000 enrollees with a final count of 50,884 women. The study was originally designed to have a 10-year follow-up, but the participants continued their commitment to the study by providing consistent response rates, which inspired the researchers to keep expanding the scope to include new topics of interest, including other cancers, cardiovascular diseases, respiratory outcomes, and gynecological conditions.

October 2024 marks the 20th anniversary of the Sister Study, making it the nation’s largest and longest ongoing study of women with a close family history of breast cancer. Despite current research, breast cancer remained the leading type of incident cancer in 2021. In 2024, breast cancer remains the second most common cancer for women in the U.S., with about 1 in 8 women being diagnosed in their lifetime. By continuing to study these sisters, the researchers hope to have an increased ability to detect disease risks related to both the environment and genes.

== Recruitment and study rationale ==
Recruitment for the study began in 2003, but nationwide enrollment began in October 2004 through March 2009. To be eligible, women must have been 35 to 74 years of age, living in the United States or Puerto Rico, and had a sister who was diagnosed with breast cancer but was not diagnosed themselves. For each targeted demographic, the study involved recruiters representing those groups. The Sister Study aimed to recruit a diverse group of volunteers to ensure the results would benefit a majority of women—researchers encouraged African American, Latina, Native American, and Asian women, as well as women 60 and older, to join the study. The study materials were made available in Spanish in 2005 to appeal to non-English speaking participants.

The study population included 8,311 women (16%) who self-identified as Hispanic/Latina or non-White, 8,874 women aged 65 years and older (17%), and 7,805 women with a high school education or less (15%). A small percentage of participants (n=3,066) completed some but not all of the study requirements. Even though they did not complete all parts, this group is followed through record linkage—vital statistics and cancer registries—to assess the outcomes for participants who did and did not fully enroll. Of the women who did not complete all of the study requirements, a more significant percentage were minority women (36%). They also had fewer years of schooling (18%) than the participants who continued the study. In the later stages of recruitment, these demographics became the focus so as not to neglect these groups in the results.

Each fully enrolled participant must have submitted baseline data—data that is collected to determine the starting point before study intervention—before beginning the study. The researchers used questionnaires to gather medical histories, environmental exposures, and lifestyle data. DNA was extracted from the blood or saliva samples to determine whether certain breast cancers were hormonally related. The Sister Study Early Study Concept (ESC) Form can be found on the Sister Study website.

=== Follow-up and participant tracking ===
After 20 years, the Sister Study is still being conducted to understand the relationship between the environment and genetics impact health outcomes. Researchers follow the cohort to identify breast cancer diagnoses and other health conditions. Through the Sister Study website, participants can report a breast cancer diagnosis or additional health conditions, fill out the follow-up questionnaires, or contact the study help desk by phone, mail, or email. The women complete annual follow-up questionnaires, update their contact information, and report any changes to their health. All materials are available in English and Spanish to ensure all participants can complete the materials.

== Findings and contributions ==
The study has supported many of the factors that can contribute to a woman developing breast cancer, including air pollution, trauma, psychosocial stress, diet, permanent hair dye and chemical hair straighteners, some ingredients in personal care products, and obesity. During the study, the researchers also found a correlation between exposure-related changes to DNA and advanced biological aging as a factor for developing breast cancer. As of August 2023, epidemiologists and public health researchers from the NIEHS have collaborated with other research organizations to publish nearly 300 research papers. A majority of papers have been published in the Environmental Health Perspectives journal as their research interest overlaps with the Sister Study’s. Many of the reports have supported links between breast cancer and genetics and environmental factors.
