= Chuck Rosenthal =

Chuck Rosenthal may refer to:

- Chuck Rosenthal (author) or C.P. Rosenthal, American novelist and short story writer
- Chuck Rosenthal (district attorney) (Charles A. Rosenthal Jr., born 1946), Republican district attorney

== See also ==
- Charles Rosenthal (1875–1954), Australian general and politician
