= Caitilyn Allen =

Microbiologist

Caitilyn Allen (born 1957 in Göttingen, West Germany) is an American plant pathologist, specializing in phytobacteriology (i.e., bacterial diseases of plants). She is an internationally recognized expert on bacterial wilt and has received several awards for her work.

== Education and career ==
Caitilyn Allen grew up in the US Midwest. She studied from 1975 to 1978 at Swarthmore College and then worked on a farm growing organic vegetables, but the venture was unprofitable. She studied for the academic year 1980–1981 at the University of Maine at Orono, where she graduated with a B.S. in botany. In 1987 she graduated with a Ph.D. in plant pathology from the Virginia Polytechnic Institute and State University. Her Ph.D. thesis is entitled Evolution of a gene for pathogenicity; endo-pectate lyase.

As a postdoc, Allen was from 1986 to 1988 a research associate in Lyon at the CNRS Laboratoire de génétique moléculaire microbienne. (She is fluent in French.) From 1988 to 1992 she held a postdoc position at the University of Wisconsin-Madison (UW-Madison), where she began research on bacterial wilt. Subsequently, she pursued such studies for next three decades. In 1992 she became a faculty member in UW-Madison's department of plant pathology. She began as an assistant professor, was promoted to associate professor, became a full professor, and is now the department's Ethel and O. N. Allen Professor. (She is unrelated to Ethel and O. N. Allen.)

Allen became in 1995 the founding director of UW-Madison's Women In Science and Engineering Residential Learning Community (called the WISE Dorm) and for her directorship received in 2001 the Women Engineers Professional/Academic Network National Women In Engineering Program Award. She has received several teaching awards. In 2008 she received from the French government the Palmes Académiques for her contribution to French education and culture. In 2009 she was elected a Fellow of the American Association for the Advancement of Science. In 2020 the American Society for Microbiology gave her the Alice C. Evans Award.

== Selected publications ==
=== Articles ===
- Huang, Qi; Allen, Caitilyn (2000). "Polygalacturonases are required for rapid colonization and full virulence of Ralstonia solanacearum on tomato plants". Physiological and Molecular Plant Pathology. 57 (2): 77–83. doi:10.1006/pmpp.2000.0283.
- Tans-Kersten, Julie; Huang, Huayu; Allen, Caitilyn (2001). "Ralstonia solanacearum Needs Motility for Invasive Virulence on Tomato". Journal of Bacteriology. 183 (12): 3597–3605. doi:10.1128/JB.183.12.3597-3605.2001. PMC 95236. PMID 11371523.
- Yao, Jian; Allen, Caitilyn (2006). "Chemotaxis is Required for Virulence and Competitive Fitness of the Bacterial Wilt Pathogen Ralstonia solanacearum". Journal of Bacteriology. 188 (10): 3697–3708. doi:10.1128/JB.188.10.3697-3708.2006. PMC 1482862. PMID 16672623.
- Swanson, Jill K.; Yao, Jian; Tans-Kersten, Julie; Allen, Caitilyn (2005). "Behavior of Ralstonia solanacearum Race 3 Biovar 2 During Latent and Active Infection of Geranium". Phytopathology. 95 (2): 136–143. doi:10.1094/PHYTO-95-0136. PMID 18943982.
- Yao, Jian; Allen, Caitilyn (2007). "The Plant Pathogen Ralstonia solanacearum Needs Aerotaxis for Normal Biofilm Formation and Interactions with Its Tomato Host". Journal of Bacteriology. 189 (17): 6415–6424. doi:10.1128/JB.00398-07. PMC 1951909. PMID 17601784.
- Champoiseau, Patrice G.; Jones, Jeffrey B.; Allen, Caitilyn (2009). "Ralstonia solanacearum Race 3 Biovar 2 Causes Tropical Losses and Temperate Anxieties". Plant Health Progress. 10. doi:10.1094/PHP-2009-0313-01-RV.
- Milling, Annett; Babujee, Lavanya; Allen, Caitilyn (2011). "Ralstonia solanacearum Extracellular Polysaccharide is a Specific Elicitor of Defense Responses in Wilt-Resistant Tomato Plants". PLOS ONE. 6 (1) e15853. Bibcode:2011PLoSO...615853M. doi:10.1371/journal.pone.0015853. PMC 3017055. PMID 21253019.
- Jacobs, Jonathan M.; Babujee, Lavanya; Meng, Fanhong; Milling, Annett; Allen, Caitilyn (2012). "The In Planta Transcriptome of Ralstonia solanacearum: Conserved Physiological and Virulence Strategies during Bacterial Wilt of Tomato". mBio. 3 (4). doi:10.1128/mBio.00114-12. PMC 3413399. PMID 22807564.

=== Books ===
- Prior, Philippe; Allen, C.; Elphinstone, John G., eds. (1998). Bacterial Wilt Disease: Molecular and Ecological Aspects. Berlin: Springer Verlag.; Prior, Philippe; Allen, Caitilyn; Elphinstone, John (29 June 2013). 2013 pbk reprint of 1998 1st edition. ISBN 978-3-642-08361-7.
- Leong, Sally A.; Allen, C.; Triplett, Eric W., eds. (2002). Biology of Plant-Microbe Interactions. Vol. 3. St. Paul: APS Press. ISBN 978-0-9654625-2-5.
- Allen, C.; Prior, P.; Hayward, Alan Christopher, eds. (2005). Bacterial Wilt: The Disease and the Ralston solanacearum Species Complex. St. Paul: APS Press. ISBN 0-89054-329-1. (APS Press bestseller for 2005).
