= Dorothy Powelson =

American microbiologist

Dorothy M. Powelson
- Born: August 8, 1916
- Died: 1988 (aged 71–72)
- Education: University of Georgia; University of Wisconsin–Madison
- Scientific career
- Fields: Microbiology
- Workplaces: University of Maine; Purdue University; Stanford Research Institute
- Thesis: Oxidation of glycerol, glucose, and acetate by Staphylococcus aureus (1946)
- Notable students: Rita Colwell; Millicent Goldschmidt

Dorothy May Powelson (August 8, 1916 – 1988) was an American microbiologist and associate professor at Purdue University. She is known for her mentorship and her research on cell properties of cancers and myxospores.

== Early life and education ==
Powelson was born in Hercules, California on August 8, 1916. She received a bachelor's degree from the University of Georgia in 1938. She then attended the University of Wisconsin, completing her master's in 1943 and her Ph.D. in 1946.

== Career and research ==
Starting in 1946, Powelson worked at the College of Agriculture and the Agricultural Experiment Station associated with the University of Maine as an instructor, then assistant professor of bacteriology, where she taught courses such as "Bacteriology for Nurses". In Maine, she helped to establish the 100th chapter of the Sigma Xi society.

She joined the faculty of Purdue University in 1949, still as an assistant professor of bacteriology. At the time, Purdue had recently expanded its Department of Biology into the Department of Biological Sciences which included three branches: bacteriology, botany, zoology and animal husbandry. In 1953, she became an associate professor. She was considered one of the top-ranking women in science in the United States, and taught advanced laboratory courses. During her time at Purdue, she received grants from the Atomic Energy commission for a study on the physiology of hydrogen bacteria, the U.S. Public Health service for a project on mycoplasma-infected cells, and the American Cancer Society. She and her student George Allen worked on bacteria cell division patterns to help clarify the differences between normal division and the uncontrolled division of cancer cells. They were interested in creating a "model culture" that reproduced in a predictable, repeatable way to facilitate their study. Powelson was also interested in the relationship between bacterial strains and cancers - whether bacteria are a cause of cancer, or may be used against cancer if the cancerous cells are more susceptible to infection. A different project involved studying myxospores, specifically cell membrane properties of Myxococcus Xanthus. She devised a technique to turn vegetative cells into myxospores, a more practical way of generating samples.

In 1957, Powelson spent a sabbatical year in Canada at the Laboratory of Hygiene.

Some of the men at Purdue in bacteriology were critical toward Powelson, suggesting that she did not receive enough grant money. She was not made full professor, though men with similar backgrounds were. In about 1960, Powelson moved to the Stanford Research Institute, where she was senior staff microbiologist, where she continued to research and publish her work. In 1963, she became associate professor at the University of Delaware, Newark in the Department of Biological Sciences. In 1969, she received research grant AI-06030-05 from the NIH for "Factors affecting cytopathogenicity of mycoplasmas".

Powelson travelled to conference events and gave talks. Her research presentations covered topics such as "Shifts in the pathways of glucose oxidation during cell division" and "Cytological aspects of the cell membrane of Myxococcus Xanthus". She was a member of the Society of American Bacteriologists, Sigma Chi, Phi Beta Kappa, Sigma Delta Epsilon, Indiana Academy of Science, and Tissue Culture Association. In 1959, she was named Indiana representative to the Society of American Bacteriologists.

== Personal life ==
In her retirement, she moved to Santa Cruz, California. She died in 1988 at age 72. Powelson is remembered as a great mentor for students, women in particular. She introduced them to the field of bacteriology and inspired them to pursue higher education and research work. One of her notable students is Rita Colwell, microbiologist and director of the National Science Foundation. She is commemorated at the University of Wisconsin with a teaching assistant award in her name.

Powelson was also a proponent of the arts. She was a member of the committee for the promotion of interest in fine arts at Purdue and sponsored a student art competition and exhibition in 1955. She also enjoyed sports and gardening. Her research brought her to Ottawa, Canada where she skied in 1958.
