= Hazel Barton =

British scientist

- Born: 1971 (age 54–55); Bristol
- Occupations: microbiologist, caver, cave diver
- Awards: Alice C. Evans Award, American Society for Microbiology (2019)
- Website: cavescience.com

Dr. Hazel A. Barton is an English born microbiologist, geologist and cave diving explorer, interested in extremophile microorganisms. She is a Loper Endowed Professor of Geological Sciences at the University of Alabama and has appeared in several documentaries.

== Early life ==
Hazel Barton grew up in Bristol, England and first experienced caving through an Outward Bound course when she was 16, which was the beginning of her life-long involvement with caving.

== Career ==
She moved to the United States six years after she started caving as a hobby and in the early 1990s studied for her PhD at the University of Colorado Health Sciences Center, in Boulder, Colorado undertaking research into drug resistant tuberculosis. After graduating, she carried out postdoctoral research with Norman R. Pace, who was also keen on caving. She became increasingly disinterested in medical microbiology and he encouraged her to consider applying modern microbiological technology, especially culture independent methods, to the microbiology of caves. This was the start of her independent research career. She was appointed the Ashland Endowed Professor of Integrative Science and an assistant professor in the Department of Biological Sciences, Northern Kentucky University in 2003 and is currently a Professor and Director of the Integrated Bioscience Program at the University of Akron

Barton studies the microbiome of caves, especially adaptations to nutrient-limitation. She considers that the microbes can be involved in the formation of caves. She is also interested in the fungus Pseudogymnoascus destructans, the causative agent of White-nose Syndrome in bats. These take advantage of her expertise in caving and have led her to caves in every continent, including Antarctica.

== Bibliography ==
Barton is the author or co-author of more than 25 publications on cave research and extremophile bacteria. These include:

=== Books and popular works ===
- Whitaker, R.J. and Barton, Hazel A. Women in Microbiology (American Society for Microbiology Press, Washington, DC. ISBN 9781555819538).
- Aulenbach, Nancy Holler and Barton, Hazel A., with Delano, Marfe Ferguson. Co-authored the children's book Exploring Caves: Journeys into The Earth. National Geographic Books, ISBN 0-7922-7721-X, March 2001. Winner of the Outstanding Science Trade Book for 2001 by the National Science Teachers

=== Primary publications ===
- Reynolds, H.T., Barton, H.A. and Slot, J.C. 2016 Phylogenomic analysis supports a recent change in nitrate assimilation in the White-nose Syndrome pathogen, Pseudogymnoascus destructans. Fungal Ecology 23: 20–29.
- Bullen HA, Oehrle SA, Bennett AF, Taylor NM, Barton HA (July 2008), "Use of attenuated total reflectance Fourier transform infrared spectroscopy to identify microbial metabolic products on carbonate mineral surfaces", Appl. Environ. Microbiol., 74 (14): 4553–9, doi:10.1128/AEM.02936-07, PMC 2493160, PMID 18502924.
- Spear JR, Barton HA, Robertson CE, Francis CA, Pace NR (October 2007), "Microbial community biofabrics in a geothermal mine adit", Appl. Environ. Microbiol., 73 (19): 6172–80, doi:10.1128/AEM.00393-07, PMC 2075011, PMID 17693567.
- Barton, H.A.; Luiszer, F. (2005), "Microbial metabolic structure in a sulfidic cave hot spring: potential mechanisms of biospeleogenesis.", Journal of Cave and Karst Studies, 67 (1): 28–38
- Barton HA, Taylor NM, Lubbers BR, Pemberton AC (July 2006), "DNA extraction from low-biomass carbonate rock: an improved method with reduced contamination and the low-biomass contaminant database", J. Microbiol. Methods, 66 (1): 21–31, doi:10.1016/j.mimet.2005.10.005, PMID 16305811.

=== Reviews ===
- Barton, H.A.; Spear, J.R.; Pace, N.R. (2001), "Microbial life in the underworld: Biogenicity in secondary mineral formations" (PDF), Geomicrobiology Journal, 18 (3): 359–368, doi:10.1080/01490450152467840
- Barton, H.A. (2006), "Introduction to cave microbiology: a review for the non-specialist" (PDF), Journal of Cave and Karst Studies, 68 (2): 43–54
- Barton, H.A.; Northup, D.E. (2007), "Geomicrobiology in cave environments: past, current and future perspectives" (PDF), Journal of Cave and Karst Studies, 69 (1): 163–178
- Barton, H.A.; Jurado, V. (2007), "What's Up Down There? Microbial Diversity in Caves", Microbe-American Society for Microbiology, 2 (3): 132
- Association and Children's Book Council. Based on their 2001 film.

=== Media appearances ===
Barton co-starred with Nancy Holler Aulenbach in the 2001 IMAX film Journey into Amazing Caves. In December 2006, Barton was featured on Animal Planet's The Real Lost World. Both featured Barton's research involving caves and the microbial life that inhabit these harsh environments.

In 2008, she was part of the TV movie documentary How Life Began and in the TV documentary series Catastrophe in the segment Snowball Earth. In 2010, she was in the segment 'Arrival' of the TV documentary series First Life. In 2012, she appeared in 'Defeating the Superbugs' of the TV documentary series Horizon. In 2012, she appeared in 'Defeating the Superbugs' in the TV documentary series Horizon. In 2013, she was in a short documentary named Bat House and in the TV Series How the Earth Works episode Ice Age or Hell Fire?.

She was one of the scientists featured in the History Channel special Journey to the Center of the World, documenting the exploration of the Guatemalan cave Naj Tunich, which was used as a sacred site by the ancient Maya. She was included in the children's book Extreme Scientists: Exploring Nature's Mysteries from Perilous Places (Scientist in the Field) by Donna M. Jackson.

== Awards ==
- In 2010, 2011 and 2013 the Barton Lab was listed as one of the 'top ten most awesome research labs' by Popular Science magazine
- In 2016 she was named a Science Hero by The My Hero Project.
- In 2018 she received the Alice C. Evans Award from the American Society for Microbiology for her work in fostering the inclusion, development and advancement of women in microbiology.
