= Ellen Jo Baron =

American pathologist

Ellen Jo Baron is an American academic who is an emerita professor of pathology at Stanford University Medical Center.

In 2005, a species of Prevotella was named Prevotella baroniae in her honor.

== Early life and education ==
Baron was born in 1947 in Madison, Wisconsin. She grew up in Mitchell, South Dakota. She earned a Bachelor of Science degree in microbiology and public health from Michigan State University. She obtained her master's degree and doctorate in medical microbiology from the University of Wisconsin–Madison. After completing her doctorate, she pursued a two-year postdoctoral fellowship in clinical microbiology and laboratory medicine at the University of California and the Wadsworth Veterans Affairs Medical Center in Los Angeles. In 1986, she became a diplomate of the American Board for Medical Microbiology.

== Career ==
After her postdoctoral fellowship, Ellen Jo Baron was appointed chief of the microbiology laboratory at North Shore University Hospital in Manhasset, New York, a position she held for five years. During this time, she also served as an assistant professor of pathology at Cornell University Medical College and held teaching roles at Touro University Medical College and Columbia University Medical College. Additionally, she was an adjunct faculty member at Adelphi University and C. W. Post.

Baron later returned to California, where from 1988 to 1990, she directed the clinical anaerobic bacteriology research laboratory at the Wadsworth Veterans Affairs Medical Center in Los Angeles. In this role, she also consulted for several healthcare organizations in California, including Endocrine Sciences and Northridge Hospital. She continued consulting for the Wadsworth Veterans Affairs Medical Center and Good Samaritan Hospital, Los Angeles in 1990 and 1995, respectively, and taught as an adjunct faculty member at the University of California, Los Angeles and the University of Southern California.

In 1997, Baron joined Stanford University as the director of operations and technical director of clinical microbiology and virology laboratories. She was appointed associate professor of pathology and medicine in 2003 and became a full professor in 2010. She also served as associate chair of pathology for diversity and faculty development for five years. Baron became a professor emerita in 2010 and served as a consulting professor until 2015. That year, she joined Cepheid, Inc., initially as director of medical affairs and later as executive director of technical and medical affairs.

In 2009, Baron and Jim McLaughlin co-founded the Diagnostic Microbiology Development Program (DMDP), a non-governmental organization. It developed the Baron Basic Microbiology Flowchart training program and focuses on improving clinical microbiology laboratory services in Cambodia. DMDP operates microbiology laboratories in five Cambodian hospitals and has supported the microbiology laboratory at the National Pediatric Hospital in Phnom Penh. Baron serves as secretary and senior advisor for DMDP.

Baron has served in leadership roles within the American Society for Microbiology and participated in numerous national committees, including those for the Infectious Diseases Society of America and the Clinical and Laboratory Standards Institute. Additionally, she has been involved with several editorial boards and acted as a consultant for organizations such as the World Health Organization and the U.S. Food and Drug Administration.

== Research ==
Baron's research has advanced understanding of anaerobic bacteria, including their identification, clinical impact, and susceptibility profiles.

== Bibliography ==
- Baron, Ellen J. (1994). Medical Microbiology: A Short Course
- Baron, Ellen J. (1997). Color Atlas of Diagnostic Microbiology

== Awards and recognition ==
Baron's awards and honors include fellowship of the American Academy of Microbiology and the Infectious Diseases Society of America. She received the Alice C. Evans Award in 1997 and the Sonnenwirth Award in 2000 from the American Society for Microbiology. In 2005, a species of Prevotella was named Prevotella baroniae in her honor, and she was awarded the Anaerobe Society of the Americas Lifetime Achievement Award in 2018.
