= Gemma Reguera =

Spanish-American microbiologist

- Born: Moreda, Aller, Asturias, Spain
- Education: Universidad de Oviedo (Spain), University of Massachusetts-Amherst
- Known for: Electromicrobiology
- Awards: Alice C. Evans Award for Advancement of Women from the American Society for Microbiology, Fellow of the American Academy of Microbiology
- Scientific career
- Workplaces: Michigan State University
- Website: http://reguera.msu.domains

Gemma Reguera is a Spanish-American microbiologist and professor at Michigan State University. She is the editor-in-chief of the journal Applied and Environmental Microbiology and was elected fellow of the American Academy of Microbiology in 2019. She is the recipient of the 2022 Alice C. Evans Award for Advancement of Women from the American Society for Microbiology. Her lab's research is focused on electrical properties of metal-reducing microorganisms.

== Biography ==
Reguera received a her BS in microbiology from Universidad de Oviedo in 1992 and earned her PhD in microbiology from the University of Massachusetts-Amherst in 2001. From 2001-2002, she worked on the role of the toxin-coregulated pilus in the ecological fitness of Vibrio cholerae as a Spanish Ministry of Science postdoctoral fellow with Roberto Kolter at Harvard Medical School. From 2002-2006, she worked as a postdoctoral fellow at the University of Massachusetts-Amherst in the group of Derek Lovley and authored the 2005 Nature publication "Extracellular electron transfer via microbial nanowires", the first report of conductive pili in Geobacter.

== Research ==
Reguera is a leader in the emerging field of electromicrobiology and potential applications of electroactive microbial biofilms in bioenergy and bioremediation. In 2011, her group discovered that uranium could be reduced outside the cell.

== Honors ==
- 2019 Elected Fellow of the American Academy of Microbiology
- 2022 ASM Alice C. Evans Award for Advancement of Women from the American Society for Microbiology

== Selected Academic Publications ==
- Extracellular electron transfer via microbial nanowires. Gemma Reguera, Kevin D McCarthy, Teena Mehta, Julie S Nicoll, Mark T Tuominen, Derek R Lovley. 2005. Nature.
- Biofilm and nanowire production leads to increased current in Geobacter sulfurreducens fuel cells. Gemma Reguera, Kelly P Nevin, Julie S Nicoll, Sean F Covalla, Trevor L Woodard, Derek R Lovley. 2006. Applied and environmental microbiology.
- Extracellular electron transfer mechanisms between microorganisms and minerals. Liang Shi, Hailiang Dong, Gemma Reguera, Haluk Beyenal, Anhuai Lu, Juan Liu, Han-Qing Yu, James K Fredrickson. 2016. Nature Reviews Microbiology.
- Electroactive biofilms: current status and future research needs. Abhijeet P Borole, Gemma Reguera, Bradley Ringeisen, Zhi-Wu Wang, Yujie Feng, Byung Hong Kim. 2011. Energy & Environmental Science.
