= Clarice Weinberg =

American biostatistician and epidemiologist

Clarice Ring Weinberg is an American biostatistician and epidemiologist who works for the National Institute of Environmental Health Sciences as principal investigator in the Biostatistics and Computational Biology Branch. Her research concerns environmental epidemiology, and its combination with genetics in susceptibility to disease, including running the Sister Study on how environmental and genetic effects can lead to breast cancer. She has also published highly cited research on fertility.

== Education and career ==
Weinberg is originally from Connecticut. She majored in mathematics at Simmons College, graduating in 1972, earned a master's degree in mathematics from Brandeis University in 1974, and completed a Ph.D. in biomathematics from the University of Washington in 1980. Her dissertation, A Test for Clustering on the Circle, was supervised by Lloyd Delbert Fisher Jr.

After three years as an acting assistant professor at the University of Washington, she joined the National Institute of Environmental Health Sciences as a mathematical statistician in 1983. She became deputy chief of the Biostatistics and Computational Biology Branch in 1997, and has held an adjunct faculty appointment at the University of North Carolina at Chapel Hill since 1986.

== Recognition ==
Weinberg was named a Fellow of the American Statistical Association in 1995. She won the Nathan Mantel Award of the Statistics in Epidemiology Section of the American Statistical Association in 2005, in recognition of her lifetime contributions to "statistical methods developed to solve problems in epidemiology resulting from involvement in epidemiological analysis". She was also the 2005 winner of the Janet L. Norwood Award for outstanding achievement by a woman in the statistical sciences.
