= Frederick C. Neidhardt =

American microbiologist (1931–2016)

Frederick Carl Neidhardt
- Born: May 12, 1931; Philadelphia, Pennsylvania
- Died: October 7, 2016 (aged 85); Tucson, Arizona
- Education: Kenyon College, Harvard University
- Scientific career
- Fields: Microbiology
- Workplaces: University of Michigan

Frederick C. Neidhardt (1931-2016) was an American microbiologist who was on the faculty at Purdue University and the University of Michigan. He is known for his work on the physiology and biochemistry of bacterial growth and for early work in bacterial proteomics.

== Early life and education ==
Neidhardt was born in Philadelphia on May 12, 1931. He was an undergraduate at Kenyon College and graduated in 1952. He then received his Ph.D. from Harvard University in 1956. He spent the next several years as a researcher at the Pasteur Institute, the University Institute of Microbiology, and the University of Regensburg before returning to the United States in 1961 for a faculty position at Purdue University.

== Academic career ==
Neidhardt's independent research career began when he joined the Purdue faculty in 1961. He remained there until 1970, when he moved to the University of Michigan to become the chair of the microbiology department; he continued as chair for the following 13 years. During that time he served in a number of other administrative roles, including associate dean for faculty in the medical school and Vice President for Research. He became the Frederick G. Novy Distinguished University Professor of Microbiology and Immunology in 1989 and retired, assuming professor emeritus status, in 1999.

Neidhardt authored or coauthored several widely recognized textbooks and reference works, including an important treatise on bacterial growth titled Escherichia coli and Salmonella: Cellular and Molecular Biology. He spent almost twenty years on the board of the Waksman Foundation for Microbiology housed at Swarthmore College and served as its president. He served as the president of the American Society for Microbiology in 1982.

== Awards and honors ==
- Eli Lilly Award in bacteriology or immunology, 1966
- Alice C. Evans Award, 1983
- Member of the American Academy of Arts and Sciences, 1996

== Personal life ==
Neidhardt was a Quaker and was noted by friends for his dedication to social causes, including support for women and minority scientists. Neidhardt had three children. He died on October 7, 2016, in Tucson, Arizona, of injuries stemming from a fall.
