= Susan Forsburg =

American microbiologist

Susan Forsburg is an American microbiologist, researcher, author, and distinguished professor at the University of Southern California. Her work primarily focuses on how DNA replication and chromosome structure affect genome stability, and using the fission yeast Schizosaccharomyces pombe as a model.

== Education ==
Forsburg attended college at the University of California, Berkeley, earning her bachelor’s degree in both English and Molecular Biology, along with a Ph.D. in Biology from the Massachusetts Institute of Technology.

== Career ==
Forsburg was a postdoc at the Imperial Cancer Research Fund at Oxford University from 1989-1993, where she was also a junior research fellow at Linacre College. She started her own lab in 1993 as an assistant professor at The Salk Institute for Biological Studies in La Jolla CA, in the Molecular Biology & Virology Laboratory, becoming an associate professor in 2000 in the Molecular & Cell Biology Laboratory. She also was appointed as an adjunct associate professor and assistant professor at the University of California, San Diego, from 1997 to 2004. In 2004 she moved her lab to the University of Southern California in Los Angeles CA, in the Molecular & Computational Biology Section of the Department of Biological Sciences in the Dornsife College of Letters, Arts, and Sciences. She was an associate professor from 2004-2006 and promoted to full Professor in 2006. She is also a member of the Cancer Center at USC Keck School of Medicine. She held the position of Gabilan Distinguished Professor in Science and Engineering. In 2020, she was named a USC Distinguished Professor.

== Practices ==
Forsburg has done research in fundamental Cancer Biology, DNA replication, chromosome dynamics, genome integrity, live cell analysis, microscopy, cell biology, genetics.

== Achievements ==
Forsburg is an elected fellow of several professional societies: American Association for the Advancement of Science (AAAS), the California Academy of Science, the American Academy of Microbiology, and the American Society for Biochemistry and Molecular Biology. She received a Junior Research Excellence award from the Women in the American Society for Cell Biology in 1996. In 2011, she was awarded the Alice C. Evans award from the American Society of Microbiology. This award in particular highlights her contributions in the advancement of women in Microbiology. She received the Nature Publishing mentoring award in 2016

Forsburg is also fellow of the Association for Women in Science.

== Publications ==
Forsburg has over 100 publications in scientific literature.
