= Alice C. Evans Award =

The ASM Alice C. Evans Award for Advancement of Women is an award given by the American Society for Microbiology (ASM) to an ASM member who has made outstanding contributions to the status of women in microbiology and related sciences. The award aims to promote full participation and equal opportunity for women in microbiology. The award is named in honor of Alice Catherine Evans, the first woman to become an ASM president.

== Recipients ==
The awardees are:

- 2023: Lorraine Findlay
- 2022: Gemma Reguera
- 2021: Jennifer B. Glass
- 2020: Caitilyn Allen
- 2019: Hazel Barton
- 2018: Carolyn Teschke
- 2017: Diane Griffin
- 2016: Carol Gross
- 2015: Nancy Hopkins
- 2014: Bonnie L. Bassler
- 2013: Joan Steitz
- 2012: Micah I. Krichevsky
- 2011: Susan L. Forsburg
- 2010: Sara Rothman
- 2009: Millicent Goldschmidt
- 2008: Jo Handelsman
- 2007: Martha M. Howe
- 2006: Joan W. Bennett
- 2005: Helen Conrad Davies
- 2004: Marian C. Johnson-Thompson
- 2003: Eva Ruth Kashket
- 2002: Marlene Belfort
- 2001: Alice Shih-hou Huang
- 2000: Anne Morris Hooke
- 1999: Ruth L. Kirschstein
- 1998: Arnold L. Demain
- 1997: Ellen Jo Baron
- 1996: Jean E. Brenchley
- 1994: Barbara Iglewski
- 1993: Lorraine Friedman
- 1992: Ruth E. Gordon
- 1991: no award
- 1990: Margaret Pittman
- 1989: Viola Mae Young-Horvath
- 1988: Rita R. Colwell
- 1986: Elizabeth O'Hern
- 1985: Loretta Leive
- 1983: Frederick C. Neidhardt
