= Millicent Goldschmidt =

American microbiologist (born 1926)

- Born: June 1, 1926 (age 100); Erie, Pennsylvania, U.S.
- Education: Case Western Reserve University; Purdue University
- Awards: Roche Diagnostics Alice C. Evans Award
- Scientific career
- Fields: Microbiology
- Workplaces: University of Texas at Houston McGovern Medical School; NASA
- Thesis: [OCLC 1237302103 Factors Affecting the Oxidation of Acetate by Micrococcus pyogenes var. aureus] (1952)
- Doctoral advisor: Dorothy M. Powelson

Millicent "Mimi" Edna Goldschmidt (née Cohen; born June 1, 1926) is an American microbiologist. She is known for her pioneering work in the field of astrobiology in addition to her medical research and her contributions to rapid testing methods for detecting microbial contaminants. Goldschmidt is a professor emerita at the University of Texas.

== Early life and education ==
Born June 1, 1926, Goldschmidt grew up in Erie, PA and grew interested in biology when examining her natural surroundings as a girl scout. By age 10, she had decided to become a biologist.

Goldschmidt received a B.A. in 1947 from Case Western Reserve University in concentrated sciences. Though initially discouraged by the amount of memorisation required in undergraduate biology, she pursued it further and became particularly interested in microbiology. She continued on to graduate studies despite resistance from her family; her parents were concerned that this decision would affect her marriage prospects. She obtained her M.S. in 1950 and Ph.D. in 1952, both from Purdue University. Her Ph.D. thesis was entitled Factors Affecting the Oxidation of Acetate by Micrococcus pyogenes var. aureus, completed under the supervision of Dr. Dorothy M. Powelson. Her master's degree project was about penicillin growth, and her findings improved commercial penicillin production yields.

== Career and research ==
After finishing her Ph.D., Goldschmidt worked in Fort Detrick, studying the effect of chemical explosions on microorganisms for George Washington University.

Goldschmidt moved to Texas, living in Austin for a short postdoctoral fellowship under Orville Wyss, then in Houston. She was hired by Robert Williams at the Baylor College of Medicine. At the time, the Apollo Program aiming to send a crewed mission to the moon was underway. One component of the project was to retrieve samples of lunar material to study. Little was known about the composition of lunar material or its potential risk to humans, and protocols needed to be established to contain, preserve, distribute and avoid terrestrial contamination of samples. Goldschmidt was contracted from Baylor to work on the Lunar Receiving Laboratory. She trained the astronauts on how to collect samples without contaminating them and analysed samples for potential biohazards (viruses, bacteria, fungi). The techniques used were time-consuming and inefficient, leading her becoming interested in rapid testing methods. Upon her return to Baylor, she was denied a position by the chair of her department and instead found a position at MD Anderson Medical Center on rapid bacteria detection. She later moved around to various appointments in the Texas Medical Center.

Since 1967, she has worked at the University of Texas at Houston as a professor of microbiology. She is passionate about teaching fundamentals to students and has sought to balance a career where she can do research as well as teach and mentor students.

At age 85, Goldschmidt retired from an active faculty position, though she remains professor emerita at the University of Texas at Houston.

Goldschmidt has developed and presented rapid testing procedures for diagnostic kits. For 30 years, she taught a two-week summer course at Kansas State University on rapid detection methods with a focus on food and cosmetic microbiology. In addition to studying new rapid detection methods, she has reviewed existing kits based on surveys among microbiologists. Her work addresses detection of Candida and Salmonellae.

Another contribution is her later medical research into the microbiological aspects of oral hygiene and facial procedures. Her work has included the considerations of antifungal agents in facial prosthetic silicone, investigations into microbial contamination in denture adhesives, and other studies concerning denture wearers, toothbrushes and toothpastes.

Goldschmidt has been a member and volunteer of the American Society for Microbiology (ASM) since 1975.

=== Advocacy ===
Goldschmidt is a long-time advocate for women in science, both through her mentorship and through her involvement in organisations supporting their career development. She has served as president of the Gulf Chapter of the Association of Women in Science. In 2007, she was appointed to the ASM's Committee on the Status of Women in Microbiology. She initiated the creation of ASM awards for women in microbiology at the postdoctoral level. She also established an award for female graduate students microbiology, awarded yearly, starting in 2012. At UT Houston, her advocacy led to the creation of courses to prevent sexual harassment.

Goldschmidt has served on the Board of Education and Training of the ASM, and remains active on the advisory board for the society's Texas branch. In 1978, she wrote an article promoting microbiology to students at the secondary level, illustrating the many potential career areas. As part of her involvement with the National Association of Biology Teachers, she took on the role of chairperson of the Texas Outstanding Biology Teacher Award Committee.

== Awards and honours ==
- 2020 Sigma Xi fellow "for distinguished scholarship, service to science and society, and for paving the road for women in STEM"
- 2011 Evan Ferguson Award for service to Sigma Xi
- 2011 ASM Founders Distinguished Service Award
- 2009 Roche Diagnostics Alice C. Evans Award, a recognition of contributions toward the full participation and advancement of women in microbiology
- 2006 Outstanding Alumni, Purdue Department of Biological Sciences
- Fellow of the American Academy of Microbiology
- Lifetime Achievement Award from the Texas Branch of the American Society for Microbiology

== Personal life ==
Goldschmidt married Eugene Goldschmidt, whom she met while in graduate school. After her marriage and during her pregnancy, her motives in attending graduate school and her commitment to research were questioned by colleagues in the Department of Biological Sciences at Purdue, who suggested that she would not have a productive career. Though she ultimately did follow her husband as he changed jobs, she consistently worked part- or full-time wherever they were located, even while pregnant. Goldschmidt and her husband had two children, born in 1953 and 1956. Eugene Goldschmidt died in 1980.

Goldschmidt is interested in paleontology and collects fossils.

== Selected publications ==
Goldschmidt is cited either as "Millicent C. Goldschmidt" or "Millicent E. Goldschmidt", based on her maiden name Cohen and middle name Edna.

- Goldschmidt, Millicent C.; Koffler, Henry (September 1950). "Effect of Surface-Active Agents on Penicillin Yields". Industrial & Engineering Chemistry. 42 (9): 1819–1823. doi:10.1021/ie50489a035.
- Goldschmidt, Millicent C.; Powelson, Dorothy M. (September 1953). "Effect of the culture medium on the oxidation of acetate by Micrococcus pyogenes var. aureus". Archives of Biochemistry and Biophysics. 46 (1): 154–163. doi:10.1016/0003-9861(53)90178-7. PMID 13092955.
- Williams, Robert P.; Goldschmidt, Millicent E.; Gott, Cora L. (April 1965). "Inhibition by temperature of the terminal step in biosynthesis of prodigiosin". Biochemical and Biophysical Research Communications. 19 (2): 177–181. doi:10.1016/0006-291X(65)90500-0. PMID 14332439.
- Goldschmidt, Millicent C.; Wyss, Orville (January 1966). "Chelation Effects on Azotobacter Cells and Cysts". Journal of Bacteriology. 91 (1): 120–124. doi:10.1128/jb.91.1.120-124.1966. PMC 315919. PMID 4955245.
- Goldschmidt, Millicent C.; Goldschmidt, E. P.; Wyss, O. (October 1967). "Differences in Toxicity of Edta + Tris Among Mating Types of Escherichia Coli". Canadian Journal of Microbiology. 13 (10): 1401–1407. doi:10.1139/m67-186. PMID 4965042.
- Goldschmidt, Millicent C.; Williams, Robert P. (September 1968). "Thiamine-induced Formation of the Monopyrrole Moiety of Prodigiosin". Journal of Bacteriology. 96 (3): 609–616. doi:10.1128/jb.96.3.609-616.1968. PMC 252349. PMID 4895047.
- Goldschmidt, Millicent C.; Lockhart, Betty M. (1 August 1971). "Simplified rapid procedure for determination of agmatine and other guanidino-containing compounds". Analytical Chemistry. 43 (11): 1475–1479. doi:10.1021/ac60305a026.
- Goldschmidt, M. C.; DuPont, H. L. (1 February 1976). "Enteropathogenic Escherichia coli: Lack of Correlation of Serotype with Pathogenicity". Journal of Infectious Diseases. 133 (2): 153–156. doi:10.1093/infdis/133.2.153. PMID 1107438.
- Goldschmidt, Millicent C.; Fung, Daniel Y.C. (March 1978). "New Methods for Microbiological Analysis of Food". Journal of Food Protection. 41 (3): 201–219. doi:10.4315/0362-028X-41.3.201. PMID 30795043.
- Fung, Daniel Y.C.; Goldschmidt, Millicent C.; Cox, Nelson A. (January 1984). "Evaluation of Bacterial Diagnostics Kits and Systems at an Instructional Workshop". Journal of Food Protection. 47 (1): 68–73. doi:10.4315/0362-028X-47.1.68. PMID 30925643.
- Fung, Daniel Y.C.; Cox, Nelson A.; Goldschmidt, Millicent C.; Bailey, J.Stanley (January 1989). "Rapid Methods and Automation: A Survey of Professional Microbiologists". Journal of Food Protection. 52 (1): 65–68. doi:10.4315/0362-028X-52.1.65. PMID 30991537.
- Gates, William D.; Goldschmidt, Millicent; Kramer, Donald (February 1994). "Microbial contamination in four commercially available denture adhesives". The Journal of Prosthetic Dentistry. 71 (2): 154–158. doi:10.1016/0022-3913(94)90024-8. PMID 8126670.
- Pigno, Mark A.; Goldschmidt, Millicent C.; Lemon, James C. (March 1994). "The efficacy of antifungal agents incorporated into a facial prosthetic silicone elastomer". The Journal of Prosthetic Dentistry. 71 (3): 295–300. doi:10.1016/0022-3913(94)90470-7. PMID 8164173.
- Robinson, Richard K., ed. (2000). Encyclopedia of food microbiology. Academic Press. ISBN 978-0-12-227070-3.
