= George S. Gaadt =

American artist (1941–2022)

- Born: December 21, 1941; Erie, Pennsylvania, USA
- Died: April 2, 2022 (aged 80)
- Education: Columbus College of Art and Design
- Occupation: Illustrator
- Known for: Military, historical, and sports art
- Spouse: Ann Stentz (m. 1966)
- Children: 2
- Website: www.gaadtstudio.com

George Stephen Gaadt (December 21, 1941, Erie—April 2, 2022) was an American artist and illustrator best known for his military and sports artwork. Based in Sewickley, Pennsylvania, Gaadt was a military history buff and a photographer and illustrator for the Pittsburgh Steelers. He also fulfilled freelance commissions for companies and organizations including Sports Illustrated, Nestlé, the Montreal Canadiens, National Geographic, and Kodak.

== Early life and education ==
Gaadt was born in Erie, Pennsylvania on December 21, 1941. As a child, he became fascinated with military history and began drawing war helmets. After graduating from Technical Memorial High School in Erie, where he was taught by Joseph Plavcan, he studied illustration at Columbus College of Art and Design. He completed a ten-week training course with Hallmark Cards during his junior year but plans to return were interrupted by his conscription into the United States Marine Corps in April 1966. However, due to existing back problems, his service was deferred and he finished his degree that June.

== Career ==
Gaadt worked for a handful of studios in his early career, including for Federman Adams Advertising Studio in Pittsburgh as an advertising illustrator. He became a photographer for the Pittsburgh Steelers in 1970 and worked with the organization in different artistic capacities until 1995. In 1979, he created a limited edition commemorative portrait to celebrate Carl Yastrzemski becoming the fourth baseball player in MLB history to hit over 400 home runs and 3,000 hits. He also produced paintings for the Steelers' 50th and 75th anniversaries. In addition to the NFL, Gaadt also worked on projects for the Naismith Memorial Basketball Hall of Fame and the Pro Football Hall of Fame, and made a limited edition graphic to celebrate the Montreal Canadiens' 1979 Stanley Cup win.

In 1974, Gaadt and his brother David held a joint illustration exhibition at the Art Institute of Pittsburgh. By 1986, they had worked for a variety of publications, including Sports Illustrated, TV Guide, and National Geographic, and clients such as Kodak, Wrangler Jeans, and Nestlé. Between them, they received awards from the Art Directors Club of New York, the New York Society of Illustrators, the Charlotte Society of Communicating Arts, and the Piedmont Triad Advertising Federation.

Gaadt's painting "Last Stand at Fort Ligonier" was included in the 200 Years of American Illustration exhibition held by the New York Society of Illustrators and the New-York Historical Society, in 1976. In 1981, he won an Addy Award as part of the Houck Advertising team in the "business publication/spreads & multiple pages, color" category. His Star Wars artwork was published in a 1982 Reader's Digest article called George Lucas, Skywalker Supreme, and was later made into a Topps Star Wars Galaxy card. Another Star Wars painting was included alongside an interview with Mark Hamill in Questar magazine. By 1996, he had also illustrated the covers of six Hardy Boys books.

Part of Gaadt's creation process for his military paintings was to conduct extensive research, including interviewing veterans and their families, to ensure accuracy and precision. Though particularly interested in World War I, Gaadt's paintings and graphics covered battles from a wide range of American history, including regiments from the French-Indian War, the Battle of the Bulge (including the Malmedy massacre), the Tuskegee Airmen, and the Boston Massacre. His 2001 piece "America's Past, Present & Future", presented at a conference in Germany just days after 9/11, showed US Army uniforms through the ages.

Gaadt also taught drawing and illustration classes and workshops, particularly aimed at children, and lectured at Carnegie-Mellon University. Throughout his life, he was a very involved member of the Sewickley community, contributing four large historical murals to Monongahela Valley area revitalization efforts in 1989 and participating in local events such as workshops, lectures, exhibitions, and photography competitions. He also served on the executive boards of the Sewickley Valley Historical Society, the Sweetwater Center for the Arts, and the Daniel B. Matthews Historical Society.

In 1991, Gaadt received an Outstanding Alumnus Award and was awarded with an honorary Master's of Visual Arts degree from Columbus College of Art and Design. Throughout his career, he was also individually recognized by the Juror-New York Society of Illustrators and the NASA Art Team. Professionally, he was a member of the Portrait Society of America, the Ohio Valley Military Society, and the Pittsburgh Society of Illustrators.

== Selected works ==
Gaadt's illustrations are included in the following books:

- 1975 - In the Old Days by Susan Perkis Haven, Macmillan Publishers
- 1984 - Jim Thorpe and the Oorang Indians by Robert Whitman, The Hubbard Company
- 1987 - Flight by Frances Todd Stewart and Charles P. Stewart III, Marlborough Ltd/Harper & Row Publishers
- 2012 - Fatal Crossroads by Danny S. Parker, Da Capo Press

Additionally, Gaadt wrote and illustrated Walter Foster Publishing's I Can Draw series, including:

- 1994 - I Can Draw Things That Move. Worldwide Media Services. August 1998. ISBN 9781560101727.
- 1997 - I Can Draw Sea Creatures. Walter Foster Publishing, Inc. ISBN 9781560102380.
- 1997 - I Can Draw Big Machines. Walter Foster Publishing. 1997. ISBN 9781560102397.

== Personal life ==
Gaadt married Ann Stentz, a fellow Columbus College graduate, in 1966; they had two children. He taught youth soccer in the late 1970s and early 1980s.

A military history buff, Gaadt participated in Great War reenactments as a German soldier, as a nod to his ancestry, for more than 30 years. He also collected World War II memorabilia.
