= Marian Johnson-Thompson =

American virologist (born 1946)

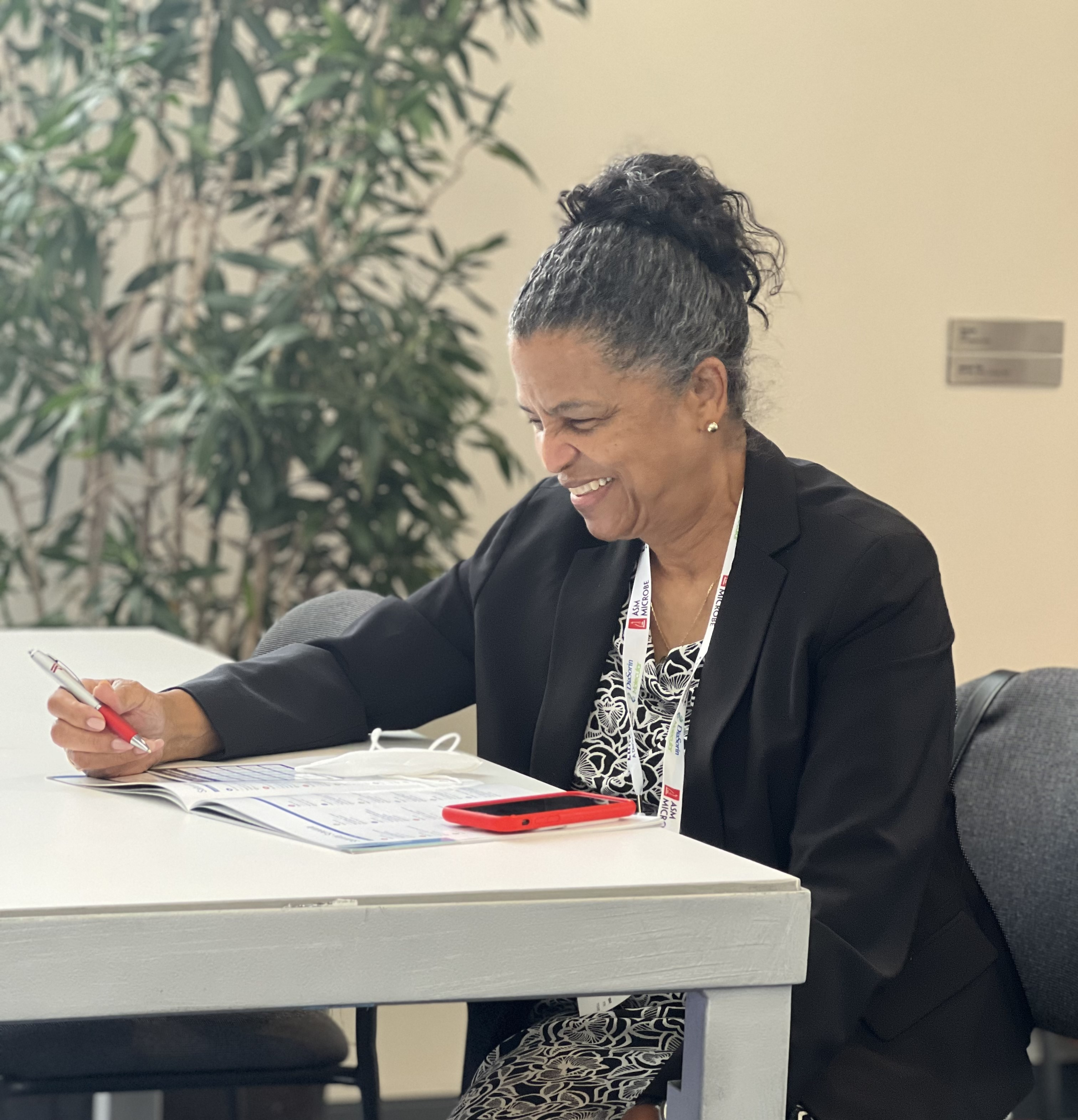
- Johnson-Thompson at ASM Microbe 2022
- Born: 1946 (age 79–80)
- Education: Howard University; Georgetown University
- Scientific career
- Fields: Virology
- Workplaces: National Institute of Environmental Health Sciences; University of the District of Columbia; University of North Carolina at Chapel Hill
- Thesis: Effect of 5-Azacytidine on simian virus 40 DNA replication (1978)

Marian Cecelia Johnson-Thompson (born December 9, 1946) is an American virologist who was a professor at the University of the District of Columbia. She was elected Fellow of the American Association for the Advancement of Science.

== Early life and education ==
Johnson-Thompson was born in Boston in 1946. She moved to Riviera Beach, Florida, as a child, where she attended high school. As an undergraduate student at Howard University, Johnson-Thompson specialized in microbiology, and graduated with a master's degree in 1971. She moved to Georgetown University for her graduate studies, where she focused on molecular virology. Only a few years after segregation, Johnson-Thompson was the first American-born Black person to complete the graduate program. She completed her doctoral research in the Georgetown University Medical Center in 1978.

== Research and career ==
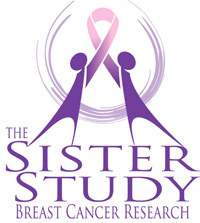
The Sister Study

Johnson-Thompson's research spanned several different aspects of virology. Initially, she studied the mechanisms of action of azacytidine against SV40. She has also investigated the impact of ultraviolet (UV) laser therapy on the stability of viral DNA. She has studied the molecular mechanisms that underpin breast cancer, showing that women of colour were most likely to suffer from environmental-induced breast cancer. This study alerted her to the need for minority sciences to be better represented in medical research.

After retiring from University of the District of Columbia in 1994, Johnson-Thompson joined the National Institutes of Health as the director of education and biomedical research development at the National Institute of Environmental Health Sciences (NIEHS), where she was responsible for clinical trials, including the Sister Study, which looked to understand the environmental causes of breast cancer. She found that African-American women were more likely to have more delayed cancer treatment diagnoses, as well as more prolonged treatment. Johnson-Thompson retired from NIEHS in 2008.

== Academic service ==
Johnson-Thompson established a scholarship at Howard University which supports women scientists from marginalized groups. The scholarship was named after Marie Taylor. In 1997 Johnson-Thompson established the Bridging Education Science and Technology Program at Hillside High School, introducing high school students to molecular biology.

== Awards and honors ==
- 1975 Outstanding Young Woman of America
- 1998 Elected Fellow of the American Academy of Microbiology
- 1999 ONI Award from the International Congress of Black Women
- 2003 Thurgood Marshall Alumni Award
- 2004 Elected Fellow of the American Association for the Advancement of Science
- 2004 Appointed professor emerita of biology and environmental at the University of the District of Columbia
- 2004 Appointed adjunct professor in the School of Public Health at the University of NC-Chapel Hill
- 2004 American Society for Microbiology Alice C. Evans Award
- 2012 Elected to the board of trustees at Howard University
- 2018 Appointed vice chair of the North Carolina Environmental Justice and Equity Board

== Selected publications ==
- Johnson-Thompson, Marian C.; Guthrie, Janet (2000). "Ongoing research to identify environmental risk factors in breast carcinoma". Cancer. 88 (S5): 1224–1229. doi:10.1002/(SICI)1097-0142(20000301)88:5+<1224::AID-CNCR8>3.0.CO;2-H. ISSN 1097-0142. PMID 10705359. S2CID 35985488.
- Newman, Lisa A.; Pollock, Raphael E.; Johnson-Thompson, Marian C. (2003). "Increasing the pool of academically oriented African-American medical and surgical oncologists". Cancer. 97 (S1): 329–334. doi:10.1002/cncr.11027. hdl:2027.42/34372. ISSN 1097-0142. PMID 12491497. S2CID 21616777.

== Personal life ==
Johnson-Thompson was born to Rose Mae Henderson Beavers, born in 1919 from Galveston, Texas. Her mother attended Holy Rosary Catholic School as well as the Holy Rosary Catholic Church. Her father, Edwin Saint Aloyious Johnson, was born in 1908 in Kingston, Jamaica, to a Haitian mother and Cuban father. Her father later immigrated to the United States, where he attended Columbia University and obtained his master’s degree. Her father later moved to Galveston, Texas, where he worked at a USO and met her mother, Ms. Henderson Beavers. Edwin Johnson later attended medical school in Boston City College. He later owned his own practice in Clewiston, Florida.

Johnson-Thompson attended grade school in Clewiston, Florida, where she lived with her father. After her father died in 1961, she continued to live with her stepmother until she finished high school at John F. Kennedy High School. She later attended Howard University, where she was advised by a botanist, Marie Clark Taylor, and biologist, John Rear[14].

Johnson-Thompson was the founder of Minority Women in Science, which was founded in 1978. She organized science discovery days events that were used to introduce minority students and women to STEM at an early age. She also established the Minority women in science Christmas Store. This program allowed children to earn currency which they could use to purchase scientific books. Johnson-Thompson is married with two children .

== Mentorship ==
Johnson-Thompson understood the importance of mentorship. While at the University of the District of Columbia, she directly mentored 14 undergraduates and master's-level students. She also mentored 17 Ph.D. level students. In 2001, she was named Meyerhoff Scholars Mentor of the Year[15].

Her doctoral degree mentees include Ashalla Magee Freeman, now director of diversity affairs at the University of North Carolina at Chapel Hill, office of graduate education; Kenneth Gibbs, now program analyst at National Institute of General Medical Science, National Institute of Health (NIH); Elena Braithwaite, now toxicologist at the FDA in Rockville, Maryland; Sherilynn Black, now assistant professor at Duke University School of Medicine; and Pocahontas Jones, Ph.D. in microbiology and immunology currently working at Halifax Community College [15].

== Inclusion of minority in science ==
In 1997, Johnson-Thompson established the Bridging Education Science and Technology program at Hillside High School in Durham, North Carolina. The programs utilized equipment and scientists from the National Institutes of Environmental Health Science (NIEHS) to educate the students with hands-on molecular biology experiences[13]. In 1994, She also established the Johnson-Thompson Taylor Endowed scholarship at Howard University in honor of her mentor Dr. Marie Taylor, who was the first female to earn a Ph.D. at Fordham University[15].
