= Applied and Environmental Microbiology =

- Discipline: Microbiology
- Language: English
- Edited by: Gemma Reguera

Publication details
- Former name: Applied Microbiology
- History: 1953-present
- Publisher: American Society for Microbiology (United States)
- Frequency: Semi-monthly
- Open access: Delayed, after 6 months
- Impact factor: 4.2 (2025)

Standard abbreviations
- ISO 4: Appl. Environ. Microbiol.

Indexing
- CODEN: AEMIDF
- ISSN: 0099-2240 (print); 1098-5336 (web)

Links
- Journal homepage

Applied and Environmental Microbiology is a biweekly peer-reviewed scientific journal published by the American Society for Microbiology. It was established in 1953 as Applied Microbiology and obtained its current name in 1975. Articles older than six months are available free of cost from the website, however, the newly published articles within six months are available to subscribers only. According to the Journal Citation Reports, the journal has a 2025 impact factor of 4.2. The journal has been ranked as one of the top 100 journals over the past 100 years in the fields of biology and medicine. The editor-in-chief is Gemma Reguera (Michigan State University).
