= Richard Anuszkiewicz =

American painter, printmaker, and sculptor (1930–2020)

Richard J. Anuszkiewicz
- Born: May 23, 1930; Erie, Pennsylvania
- Died: May 19, 2020 (aged 89)
- Education: Cleveland Institute of Art, Yale University School of Art
- Movement: Op Art
- Website: richardanuszkiewicz.com

Richard Joseph Anuszkiewicz (/ˌɑːnəsˈkeɪvɪtʃ/; May 23, 1930 – May 19, 2020) was an American painter, printmaker, and sculptor. The son of Polish immigrants, he developed a geometric style.

== Life and work ==
Anuszkiewicz was born in Erie, Pennsylvania, the son of Victoria (Jankowski) and Adam Anuszkiewicz, who worked in a paper mill. His parents were Polish immigrants. He first studied art under Joseph Plavcan while still in high school, later describing him as his most significant influence. Anuszkiewicz trained at the Cleveland Institute of Art in Cleveland, Ohio (1948–1953), and then with Josef Albers at the Yale University School of Art in New Haven, Connecticut (1953–1955), where he earned his Masters of Fine Arts. While at Yale, Anuszkiewicz was roommates with a fellow abstract painter of Polish descent and a student of Albers, Julian Stanczak.

He was one of the leading figures in the Op Art movement during the late 1960s and throughout the 1970s. Victor Vasarely in France and Bridget Riley in England were his primary international counterparts. In 1964, Life magazine called him "one of the new wizards of Op". While reflecting on a New York City gallery show of Anuszkiewicz's from 2000, New York Times art critic Holland Cotter described Anuszkiewicz's paintings: "The drama — and that feels like the right word — is in the subtle chemistry of complementary colors, which makes the geometry glow as if light were leaking out from behind it." Anuszkiewicz exhibited at the Venice Biennale, Florence Biennale and Documenta, and his works are in permanent collections internationally. He was elected into the National Academy of Design in 1992 as an Associate member, and became a full member in 1994.

== Style ==
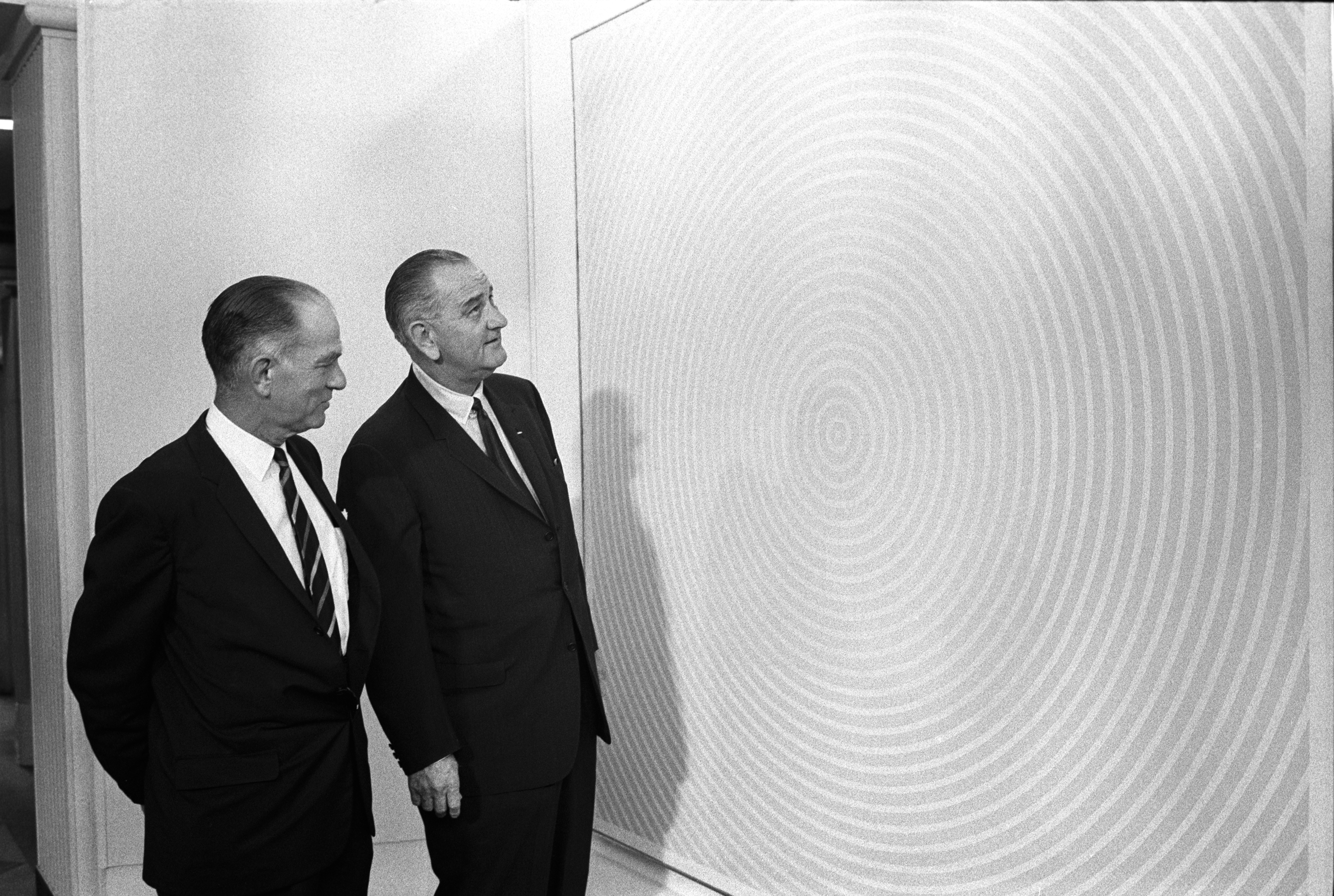
U.S. President Lyndon Baines Johnson and U.S. Senator J. William Fulbright inspect "Squaring the Circle", a bright red 1963 painting by Richard Anuszkiewicz, at the 1965 White House Arts Festival.

Anuszkiewicz was concerned with the optical changes that occur when different high-intensity colors are applied to the same geometric configurations. Most of his work comprises visual investigations of formal structural and color effects, many of them nested square forms similar to the work of his mentor Josef Albers. In his series, "Homage to the Square", Albers experimented with juxtapositions of color, and Anuszkiewicz developed these concepts further. Anuszkiewicz continued to produce works in the Op Art style over the subsequent decades of his career.

In 1963, Anuszkiewicz summarized his approach to painting as: "My work is of an experimental nature and has centered on an investigation into the effects of complementary colors of full intensity when juxtaposed and the optical changes that occur as a result, and a study of the dynamic effect of the whole under changing conditions of light, and the effect of light on color."

== Selected collections holding works ==
- Akron Art Museum, Akron, Ohio
- Albright-Knox Art Gallery, Buffalo
- Art Institute of Chicago
- Blanton Museum of Art, University of Texas
- Boca Raton Museum of Art
- Carnegie Museum of Art, Pittsburgh
- Chicago Museum of Contemporary Art
- Cleveland Museum of Art
- Columbus Museum of Art
- Currier Museum of Art
- Denver Art Museum
- Erie Art Museum
- Detroit Institute of Arts
- Flint Institute of Arts
- Fogg Museum, Harvard University
- The Governor Nelson A. Rockefeller Empire State Plaza Art Collection
- Hokkaido Museum of Modern Art
- Honolulu Museum of Art
- Indiana University Art Museum, Bloomington
- Metropolitan Museum of Art, New York
- Museum of Contemporary Art Jacksonville
- Museum of Modern Art, New York
- Philadelphia Museum of Art, Philadelphia
- Guggenheim Museum, New York
- Wadsworth Atheneum, Hartford
- Whitney Museum of Art, New York
- Richard M. Ross Art Museum, Ohio

== Grants and awards ==
- 1953: Pulitzer Traveling Fellowship
- 1963: Charles of the Ritz Oil Painting Award
- 1964: The Silvermine Guild Award for Oil Painting
- 1977: Cleveland Arts Prize
- 1980: Hassam Fund Purchase Award
- 1988: Hassam Fund Purchase Award
- 1994: New York State Art Teachers' Association Award
- 1995: Emil and Dines Carlson Award
- 1996: New Jersey Pride Award
- 1997: Richard Florsheim Fund Grant
- 2000: Lee Krasner Award
- 2005: Lorenzo dei Medici Career Award, awarded at the Florence Biennale

== Exhibitions ==
Anuskiewicz exhibited in many public collections around the world, including such New York galleries as Sidney Janis, The Contemporaries, and the Andrew Crispo Gallery.

- 1955: Butler Institute of American Art, Youngstown, Ohio
- 1966: Cleveland Museum of Art, Cleveland, Ohio
- 1967: The Hopkins Center, Hanover, New Hampshire
- 1968: Kent State University, Kent, Ohio
- 1972: Museum of Contemporary Art Jacksonville, Jacksonville, Florida
- 1976: La Jolla Museum of Contemporary Art, La Jolla, California
- 1977: Columbus Museum of Art, Columbus, Ohio
- 1978: Ringling Museum, Sarasota, Florida
- 1978: Allentown Art Museum, Allentown, Pennsylvania
- 1979: Alex Rosenberg Gallery, New York City, New York
- 1979: Clark Art Institute, Williamstown, Massachusetts
- 1980: Brooklyn Museum, Brooklyn, New York
- 1980: Carnegie Museums of Pittsburgh, Pittsburgh, Pennsylvania
- 1984: Heckscher Museum of Art, Huntington, New York
- 1984: Canton Art Institute, Canton, Ohio
- 1986: Tampa Museum of Art, Tampa, Florida
- 2005: Florence Biennale, Fortezza da Basso, Firenze, Italy

== Bibliography ==
- Anuszkiewicz, Richard and Karl Lunde. "Anuszkiewicz." New York: H.N. Abrams (1977). ISBN 0-8109-0363-6
- Alviani, Getulio, Margaret A. Miller and Giancarlo Pauletto. "Richard Anuszkiewicz: Opere 1961-1987." Pordenone: Centro Culturale Casa A. Zanussi (1988).
- Buchsteiner, Thomas and Ingrid Mossinger. "Anuszkiewicz Op Art." Ostfildern: Hatje Cantz Publishers (1997). ISBN 978-3-7757-0671-1
- Kolva, Jeanne, Maxine Lurie (ed.) and Marc Mappen (ed.). Anuszkiewicz, Richard. "Encyclopedia of New Jersey." New Brunswick: Rutgers University (2004). 9780813533254
- Madden, David and Nicholas Spike. "Richard Anuszkiewicz: Paintings & Sculptures 1945-2001: Catalogue Raisonné." Florence: Centro Di Edizioni (2010). ISBN 978-88-7038-483-3
- Price, Marshall N. "The Abstract Impulse: fifty years of abstraction at the National Academy, 1956-2006." Manchester: Hudson Hills Press (2007). ISBN 978-1-887149-17-4
- Ratliff, Floyd, Neil K. Rector and Sanford Wurmfeld. "Color Function Painting: The Art of Josef Albers, Julian Stanczak and Richard Anuszkiewicz." Winston-Salem: Wake Forest UJohn Gruen (September, 1979). "Richard Anuszkiewicz: A Beautiful Discourse with Space". ARTnews. University Fine Arts Gallery (1996). ISBN 0-9720956-0-8
- Gruen, John (September, 1979). "Richard Anuszkiewicz: A Beautiful Discourse with Space". ARTnews: 68, 69, 72, 73, 74.
