= Joseph Plavcan =

American painter (1908–1981)

Joseph Michael Plavcan
- Sky Above, Earth Below by Joseph Plavcan, n.d., Erie Art Museum
- Born: July 19, 1908; Braddock, Pennsylvania, United States
- Died: February 7, 1981 (aged 72); Erie, Pennsylvania, United States
- Education: Pennsylvania Academy of the Fine Arts
- Occupations: Visual artist, teacher
- Known for: Painting
- Spouse: Catherine Burns (m.)

Joseph Michael Plavcan (July 19, 1908 – February 7, 1981) was an American painter and teacher. He was active in Erie, Pennsylvania.

== Early life, family ==
Plavcan was born in Braddock, Pennsylvania, to Czechoslovak immigrant parents. Soon after his birth his parents moved the family back to Erie, Pennsylvania. Plavcan spent much of his youth reading and studying art at the Erie Public Library, which at the time included the Public Library, the Public Museum, and the Art Club (later The Erie Art Museum.)

Plavcan studied trade at Academy High School but did not flourish there until noted instructor and Saturday Evening Post illustrator Eugene Iverd suggested that he take art classes. Under Ericson’s tutelage Plavcan developed a lifelong appreciation for landscape painting, and in October 1926, he was accepted into the Pennsylvania Academy of the Fine Arts.

== Academic accomplishments ==
In 1928, after his second year at the Academy, Plavcan was awarded the Cresson Traveling Scholarship for further study in Europe. This time overseas shaped his work for the rest of his life. He was particularly influenced by Hans Memling and was an early promoter of the watercolors of J. M. W. Turner. In 1930, Plavcan returned to Erie and graduated from the Academy. That same year his painting The Blue Pitcher was accepted into the 29th Carnegie International in Pittsburgh; an exhibition that was juried by Henri Matisse. At the age of twenty-two, Plavcan received the Clark Award at the Corcoran Biennial in Washington, D.C. for his painting Mechanic Street, New Hope, Pennsylvania. He also had two paintings on display at the Art Institute of Chicago’s annual show.

== Teaching career ==
In 1936, he was inducted into the Who's Who in American Art.

Plavcan married Catherine Burns, an artist he had met at the Academy and returned to Erie in 1931. The scarcity of jobs for artists during the depression led Plavcan to accept a job teaching at Erie Technical High School. Within a year, Plavcan was teaching vocational courses full-time; a position he would keep until his retirement in 1970. Unlike other instructors, Plavcan taught many of his classes outdoors, and his students recall how he emphasized observation and the fundamentals of fine art. Many of his students, including Richard Anuszkiewicz, Robert Joy, John Vahanian, Vitus Kaiser, George Gaadt, Robert Gerbracht, and John Silk Deckard went on to garner national and international fame.

== Style ==
Throughout his career Plavcan was continually committed to color, though his work itself ranges from the realistic to the highly stylized. With the development of acrylic paints in the 1960s, Plavcan turned away from his earlier representational style and began experimenting with a hard-edged geometric style. These later paintings incorporate vibrant, unblended colors and were inspired by the work of his own student, Op-artist Richard Anuszkiewicz. Plavcan continued to develop this style until the end of his life, ultimately settling on a more subtle approach that used the same bright colors but softer edges. On the evolution of his art, Plavcan stated, "I don’t think that I have gone back to my earlier style. It is a building process, not necessarily regression. It is very hard once you’ve learned additional information to not use that in your art."

== Exhibitions ==
- Pennsylvania Academy of the Fine Arts, Philadelphia, Pennsylvania
- Carnegie International, Pittsburgh, Pennsylvania
- 1930 and 1951 Corcoran Biennial, Washington, D.C.
- National Academy of Design, New York
- Butler Institute of American Art, Youngstown, Ohio
- Pepsi-Cola "Artists for Victory" National Show, Metropolitan Museum of Art, New York
- Chautauqua Institute, New York
- Biennial Drawing Exhibition, Norfolk, Virginia
- Erie Art Museum, Erie, Pennsylvania

== Bibliography ==
- Erie Art Museum (2008). Joseph Plavcan: Centennial Exhibition, June 28, 2008-September 14, 2008 (PDF). Erie Art Museum. Archived from the original (PDF) on 2016-06-24.
- Suehr, Mary P. (1985). "The Life of Joseph Plavcan". Journal of Erie Studies. 14 (2).
