= Eugene Iverd =

American illustrator and painter

George Ericson (1893–1936), who worked under the name Eugene Iverd, was an American illustrator, teacher, and painter.

== Early life ==
Iverd was born January 13, 1893, in St. Paul, Minnesota, and he graduated from high school in Waseca, Minnesota. He received degrees from the Saint Paul School of Art and The Pennsylvania Academy of Fine Arts in Philadelphia.

== Career ==
Iverd came to Erie, Pennsylvania, in September 1921 directly from the U.S. Army. In the army, he was an instructor at the Walter Reed Hospital in Washington, D.C., where he was located between August 1919 and July 1921. In the summer of 1921 he was hired as an art instructor at the Erie school district assigned to Academy High School. He is remembered fondly as an art instructor among his many successful students: Joseph Plavcan, Wilbur Adams, Robert Joy, Andrew H. Hintenach, Lester Roesner, and Harry Simpson. When he was at Academy High, he sent many Erie students to the Academy of Fine Arts at Philadelphia. At one time, there were six of his students out of one hundred there.

He gave his time to the art classes until 1930, when his commercial work became too heavy. In his career he designed a series of four calendars and completed work for the Erie Lithograph Co., and for the U.S. Lithograph Co. in Brooklyn. Iverd was nationally known for covers he painted for the Saturday Evening Post, McCall's, Ladies Home Journal, and The American Magazine. He also made several paintings for the Dorrance Co. (owners of Campbell's Soup), Successful Farming, Christian Herald, The Rotarian, Monarch Foods, Winchester Western Company, Pure Oil Cooperation, Iodent Toothpaste and the Buffalo Evening News.

== Legacy ==
He used Erie children as models for his work. Ericson remained in Erie and did not move to a Metropolitan area because he was assured of securing child models that had the "glow of sunshine in them".

As an illustrator, he shared an important accomplishment alongside artists as Grant Wood, Frederic Remington, Norman Wyeth, Andrew Wyeth, and Norman Rockwell. They all had in common that they sold paintings to the Curtis Publishing Company that were used for covers on the Saturday Evening Post. He produced 29 covers for the Saturday Evening Post between 1926 and his death in 1936.

Many Erie children who posed for Ericson appeared on the cover of magazines, calendars, and advertisements. He had a niche for capturing the joys and wholesomeness of boyhood, and children were the subjects of many of his paintings.

In 1930, George and Lillian Ericson purchased a plot in the Glenwood neighborhood of Erie, where he personally designed and had built a large house with five bedrooms, two and a half bathrooms, two fireplaces, three chimneys, and many interesting features. The oak beams in the living room ceiling were imported from Canada, and the walls were plastered in the French style, which Ericson personally demonstrated to the craftsmen building his house. The wooden doors inside the house are interesting and unusually shaped: no two are identical. One year after Ericson's sudden death in 1936, Mrs. Lillian Ericson sold the house to Richard and Katherine Yates, and it has since changed hands six more times. In 2002, it underwent a major renovation and refurbishing, and much of the original look was restored. Two of the Iverd paintings are still hanging in the house today, including "Fall" above the living room fireplace and one of his "Saturday Evening Post" covers above the studio fireplace in the room he used for paintings.

In Erie there is a mural by Ericson in the Zem Zem Children's Hospital, and a large collection of his work is at the Erie School Board at the Erie History Center.
