= Y-ME National Breast Cancer Organization =

US non-profit organization

Y-ME Race Against Breast Cancer in 1996.

Y-ME National Breast Cancer Organization or Y-ME (previously Breast Cancer Network of Strength) was a Chicago-based national nonprofit organization that provided resources, information, and support to those suffering from breast cancer. Their mission was to "ensure, through information, empowerment and peer support, that no one faces breast cancer alone." Y-ME National Breast Cancer Organization did not fund research but did advocate for research. The organization closed in 2012, but until May 2020, their website continued to publish various articles relating to breast cancer.

Y-ME National Breast Cancer Organization's headquarters was in Chicago, but it had support groups throughout the United States, which provided peer support, educational programs, and coordinated advocacy efforts.

Y-ME's main program was the Y-ME Hotline, the only multilingual 24-hour breast cancer hotline in the country, staffed entirely by trained peer counselors who are breast cancer survivors.

== History ==
Y-ME was founded in 1978 by breast cancer patients Ann Marcou (1932–2004) and Mimi Kaplan (d. 1983), and began as a hotline operated out of Marcou's Chicago-area home and a support group that met at a local YWCA. The organization was originally named YWCA and Me after its association with the local YWCA and the name was later shortened to Y-ME. Y-ME became a national organization that helped breast cancer patients receive support, access information and make informed decisions about their healthcare. Its hotline was notable for being the only multilingual, round-the-clock support service available in the US and received approximately 40 000 calls per year.

In 1992, Margaret Harte founded Y-ME's annual Mother's Day Race Against Breast Cancer which supported breast cancer survivors and raised money each year to support the organization.

Y-ME changed its name to Breast Cancer Network of Strength in 2008 to "better communicate [their] mission," which was "to ensure through information, empowerment and peer support, that no one faces breast cancer alone." It reverted to its former name in 2011 after CEO Cindy Geoghegan was hired.

Y-ME closed its doors on July 12, 2012, and filed for Chapter 7 bankruptcy on July 17, 2012. One former employee said that the organization had mismanaged real estate leases while a former board member said that the organization closed due to the economic downturn, low Mother's Day Race receipts, and other short-term debt. Another former board member said that the organization had shut down because there had been "[a] serious cash flow problem stemming from an unexpected cash flow crisis and low revenues from our major fundraisers put the organization in financial instability."

Until May 10th, 2020, Y-ME.org continued to publish articles relating to breast cancer and other health or lifestyle-related subjects. As of 2022, their website is still accessible despite the organization's inactivity.

== Programs ==
Y-ME offered a number of programs that provided support and education for both the people diagnosed with breast cancer and their loved ones. These programs included the multilingual 24-hour hotline, the organization's website, as well as newsletters, brochures, and other articles. Y-ME also offered monthly support groups at affiliate locations and matched peer support for those diagnosed with breast cancer and their partners. In its effort to focus on women who did not have many financial resources, the organization offered free mammograms, wigs, and prosthetics to them.

Y-ME National Breast Cancer Organization Advocacy program worked to increase breast cancer research funding, support breast cancer related clinical studies and ensure quality health care for all.

== Events ==
In 1991, Margaret Harte, a two-time breast cancer survivor, launched the Y-ME Race in Chicago (formerly known as the Walk to Empower) to serve as a symbol of hope, inspiration and support, and to provide an opportunity for individuals to make a difference in the fight against breast cancer. Since its inception, the Y-ME Race became a Mother's Day tradition and the largest cause-related event in Chicago. Eighty percent of each dollar raised benefited programs and services offered free of charge to those seeking information and support when facing breast cancer.
