= Ruth Eleanor Newton =

American illustrator and doll designer

- Born: March 6, 1884
- Died: May 25, 1972 (aged 88)
- Known for: Illustration

Ruth Eleanor Newton (March 6, 1884 – May 27, 1972) was an American illustrator and doll designer.

== Early life and education ==
Newton was born in Erie, Pennsylvania. She began studying art as a student at Erie High School and took additional classes at the Catlin School of Art, where owner and instructor Lovisa Card-Catlin assisted her in obtaining a scholarship to the Philadelphia School of Fine Art in 1902. In 1906, while studying in Philadelphia, Newton won a prize for best illustrations leading to her first book, The Old Schloss, by author Margaret L. Corlies. This publication was followed by two more children's books, The Castle of Grumpy Grouch, by Wary Dickerson Donahey, in 1908 and Songs of a Little Child's Day, by Emilie Poulsson and Eleanor Smith in 1910.

== Career ==
Following her study in Philadelphia, Newton became a free-lance artist based in Boston, producing greeting cards for companies such as the Rust-Craft Corporation and advertisements for the Ivory Soap Company and others. After briefly returning to Erie, Newton moved to Greenwich Village in New York City, where she established her studio and spent the next thirty-eight years as an illustrator and designer.

During the 1920s, the Whitman Publishing Company offered Newton a contract to illustrate children's books. Over the next twenty years, she illustrated over 40 titles for Whitman, including The Night Before Christmas, Mother Goose, Kittens and Puppies, and Peter Rabbit. In the late 1940s, Newton began designing dolls, including one called "Amosandra", in 1949 in conjunction with the "Amos and Andy" radio show. She went on to design nearly 30 other dolls, but none which created the excitement of "Amosandra".

== Retirement and death ==
Newton continued producing art until her retirement in 1968 at which point she returned to Erie. After a bad fall in 1969, she required full-time nursing care and lived the remainder of her years in the Rondale Nursing Home. She died on May 27, 1972.
