= Julie Craig =

American actress and singer

Julie Craig is an American actress and singer.

== Early life and education ==
Craig was born in Erie, Pennsylvania. She earned a Bachelor of Fine Arts degree from the New York University Tisch School of the Arts.

== Career ==
After graduating from college, Craig then began her career on the New York stage, as Luisa in the musical The Fantasticks, alongside writer and creator Tom Jones, and City Center Encores! productions of The Apple Tree and Bye Bye Birdie. She also appeared on the City Center stage with the New York Gilbert and Sullivan Players in The Pirates of Penzance, among others. Craig can be heard on the original cast recording of The Black Monk, a musical based on the Chekov story that opened at Theatre Row in New York City, where she originated the role of Tanya.

On the international tour throughout Asia and Europe, Craig played Maria in West Side Story which was directed by Joey McKneely, the former assistant to Jerome Robbins. Regionally, her most distinguished credits include Les Misérables as Cosette (for which she received a Barrymore Award Nomination for Best Supporting Actress in a Musical) as well as Lope de Vega's The Dog in the Manger with the Shakespeare Theatre Company.

Craig's television credits include a recurring role on TNT's Murder In The First, as well as The Young and the Restless, Law & Order: SVU, and Cupid. Film credits include Rock Dog directed by Academy Award Nominated Ash Brannon, and indie feature Life at the Resort, which won Best Comedy Feature at the New York International Independent Film & Video Festival. Craig co-wrote, co-produced, and acted in a short film titled Chance of Showers, which world premiered at Dances With Films on June 18, 2019, at Grauman's Chinese Theatre. This same film was an Official Selection and Finalist in the Films By Women category at the Burbank International Film Festival.

Craig completed her debut solo album titled From Here with release date January 10, 2020. The album features her soprano vocals in the classical crossover style with a 46-piece orchestra from Budapest, Hungary. It was recorded primarily at The Village (studio), produced by Daniel Weidlein, and mixed by Matt Dyson.

== Personal life ==
Craig is based in Los Angeles and New York City.

== Filmography ==
=== Film ===
Year	Title	Role	Notes
2011	Life at the Resort	Ruby	
2014	Fade to White	Seffer	
2016	Rock Dog	Additional voices	

=== Television ===
Year	Title	Role	Notes
2008	Guiding Light	Desk Clerk	2 episodes
2009	Cupid	Tracy Flick Type	Episode: "Shipping Out"
2009	Law & Order: SVU	Emily Keefe	Episode: "Sugar"
2014	The Emperors	Erica	Television film
2015	The Young and the Restless	Nurse	Episode #1.10699
2015, 2016	Murder in the First	Keyes	2 episodes
2021	Blindspotting	Sharon	Episode #2.2
2021	Truth Be Told	Shae	9 episodes
