= Ruth Deckard =

Ruth Deckard was an American pinup artist, known only as Deckard for many years and thought to be a man. It wasn't until The Great American Pin-up was published in 1996 that the world knew she was a woman. She was a Chicago-based artist. Most of her paintings were published by Louis F. Dow Co. of St. Paul, Minnesota. She painted from the mid-1930s into the 1950s. Her art was not as refined as Alberto Vargas or Petty, but it had a great appeal to the masses. One of her best is named Pin Cushion, a woman lying on her back with a white top and skirt, her legs draped over the top of a round cushion, and four bowling pins leaned against the cushion.
