= Orville Wyss =

American microbiologist (1912–1993)

- Born: September 10, 1912; Medford, Wisconsin, U.S.
- Died: November 11, 1993 (aged 81); Brush, Colorado, U.S.
- Education: University of Wisconsin–Madison (BS, MS, PhD)
- Occupation: Microbiologist
- Spouse: Margaret Bess Bedell (m. 1941)
- Children: 3
- Scientific career
- Fields: Microbiology

Orville Wyss (September 10, 1912, Medford, Wisconsin – November 11, 1993, Brush, Colorado) was an American microbiologist. He was the president of the American Society for Microbiology in 1965.

== Biography ==
Wyss graduated from the University of Wisconsin–Madison with a B.S. in 1937, an M.S. in 1938, and a Ph.D. in 1941. His Ph.D. thesis is entitled The mechanism of biological nitrogen fixation: comparison of the symbiotic and non-symbiotic systems. From 1941 to 1945 he was a research bacteriologist employed by Wallace & Tiernan Products, Inc. In the department of microbiology of the University of Texas at Austin, he was an associate professor from 1945 to 1948 and a full professor from 1948 to 1983, when he retired as professor emeritus. He chaired the department from 1959 to 1969 and again from 1975 to 1976. He supervised the doctoral dissertations of about 70 graduate students, 10 of whom eventually chaired their own microbiology departments.

During his employment by the Wallace & Tiernan Company, he was instrumental in the development of Desenex. He did research on bacterial nitrogen fixation and the physiology and genetics of bacteria. From 1962 to 1963 he worked at McMurdo Station as a biologist for the United States Antarctic Research Program.

Wyss was elected in 1953 a Fellow of the American Association for the Advancement of Science. In 1967 the United States Board of Geographic Names named Mount Wyss in his honor. He was a Fulbright fellow in 1971 in Australia and in 1978 in Nepal.

In 1941 he married Margaret Bess Bedell. They had three daughters.

== Selected publications ==
=== Articles ===
- Fred, E. B.; Wilson, P. W.; Wyss, Orville (1938). "Light Intensity and the Nitrogen Hunger Period in the Manchu Soybean". Proceedings of the National Academy of Sciences. 24 (1): 46–52. Bibcode:1938PNAS...24...46F. doi:10.1073/pnas.24.1.46. PMC 1077023. PMID 16588187.
- Wyss, Orville; Wilson, P. W. (1941). "Mechanism of Biological Nitrogen Fixation". Proceedings of the National Academy of Sciences. 27 (3): 162–168. doi:10.1073/pnas.27.3.162. PMC 1078296. PMID 16588441.
- Stone, Wilson S.; Wyss, Orville; Haas, Felix (1947). "The Production of Mutations in Staphylococcus aureus by Irradiation of the Substrate". Proceedings of the National Academy of Sciences. 33 (3): 59–66. Bibcode:1947PNAS...33...59S. doi:10.1073/pnas.33.3.59. PMC 1078988. PMID 16578245.
- Haas, Felix; Wyss, Orville; Stone, Wilson S. (1948). "The Effect of Irradiation on Recombination in Escherichia coli". Proceedings of the National Academy of Sciences. 34 (6): 229–232. Bibcode:1948PNAS...34..229H. doi:10.1073/pnas.34.6.229. PMC 1079100. PMID 16588802.
- Wyss, Orville; Clark, J. Bennett; Haas, Felix; Stone, Wilson S. (1948). "The role of peroxide in the biological effects of irradiated broth". Journal of Bacteriology. 56 (1): 51–57. doi:10.1128/jb.56.1.51-57.1948. PMC 518542. PMID 18863626. S2CID 27409990.
- Thompson, T. L.; Mefferd, Roy B.; Wyss, Orville (1951). "The Protection of Bacteria by Pyruvate Against Radiation Effects". Journal of Bacteriology. 62 (1): 39–44. doi:10.1128/jb.62.1.39-44.1951. PMC 386082. PMID 14861157.
- Werkman, C. H.; Wilson, P. W., eds. (22 October 2013). "Chapter VI. Chemical factors affecting growth and death by Orville Wyss". Bacterial Physiology. Elsevier. pp. 178–213. ISBN 9781483274850. (reprint of 1951 original)
- Fernandez, Bernal; Haas, Felix L.; Wyss, Orville (1953). "Induced Host-Range Mutations in Bacteriophage". Proceedings of the National Academy of Sciences. 39 (10): 1052–1057. Bibcode:1953PNAS...39.1052F. doi:10.1073/pnas.39.10.1052. PMC 1063904. PMID 16589372.
- Wyss, Orville; Neumann, Marilyn G.; Socolofsky, M. D. (1961). "Development and Germination of the Azotobacter Cyst". The Journal of Biophysical and Biochemical Cytology. 10 (4): 555–565. doi:10.1083/jcb.10.4.555. PMC 2225101. PMID 13787014.
- Meyer, George H.; Morrow, Marie B.; Wyss, Orville; Berg, Thomas E.; Littlepage, Jack L. (1962). "Antarctica: The Microbiology of an Unfrozen Saline Pond". Science. 138 (3545): 1103–1104. Bibcode:1962Sci...138.1103M. doi:10.1126/science.138.3545.1103. PMID 17772969. S2CID 42714160.
- Eklund, Curtis; Wyss, Orville (1962). "Enzyme Associated with Bacteriophage Infection". Journal of Bacteriology. 84 (6): 1209–1215. doi:10.1128/jb.84.6.1209-1215.1962. PMC 278047. PMID 16561980.
- Vela, G. R.; Wyss, Orville (1964). "Improved Stain for Visualization of Azotobacter Encystment". Journal of Bacteriology. 87 (2): 476–477. doi:10.1128/jb.87.2.476-477.1964. PMC 277034. PMID 14151075.
- Vela, Gerard R.; Wyss, Orville (1965). "Radiation Resistance of Soil Azotobacter". Journal of Bacteriology. 89 (5): 1280–1285. doi:10.1128/jb.89.5.1280-1285.1965. PMC 277640. PMID 14292998.
- Goldschmidt, M. C.; Wyss, O. (1967). "The Role of Tris in EDTA Toxicity and Lysozyme Lysis". Journal of General Microbiology. 47 (3): 421–431. doi:10.1099/00221287-47-3-421. PMID 4962334. (See tris and EDTA.)

=== Books ===
- Wyss, Orville; Williams, O. B.; Gardner Jr., E. W. (1963). Elementary Biology. New York: John Wiley & Sons.
- Wyss, Orville; Eklund, Curtis (1971). Microorganisms and Man. New York: John Wiley & Sons. ISBN 9780471969006.
