= John Silk Deckard =

American sculptor (1938–1994)

- Born: 1938; Erie, Pennsylvania, U.S.
- Died: June 7, 1994 (aged 55–56); Erie, Pennsylvania, U.S.
- Known for: Sculpture, printmaking

John Silk Deckard (1938 – June 7, 1994) was an American artist from Erie, Pennsylvania. He worked in a number of media, including drawing, painting, printmaking, and sculpture.

== Life and work ==
Deckard studied art under Joseph Plavcan, also from Erie. He studied with Plavcan until the age of 17, at which point he earned a scholarship to attend the Pennsylvania Academy of the Fine Arts in Philadelphia. He also studied at Edinboro State College, Carnegie Mellon University, the University of Pennsylvania, and the Pratt Institute in Brooklyn. He began his career with making prints, and it was in this medium that he first began to explore the recurring themes that would appear in his work throughout his career: alienation, sacrifice, and powerlessness.

His first acceptance into a major exhibition was in New York City in 1965, where the Associated American Artists invited him to participate in an exhibit entitled A New Generation of American Printmakers. That same year, the Pennsylvania Academy of the Fine Arts included his work in their Annual Exhibition, and the Boston Printmakers included him in the Boston Printmakers Annual Print Exhibition. Then, the following year, he was included again in the Boston Printmakers Annual Print Exhibition, as well as the Whitney Museum of American Art's Annual Exhibition 1966: Contemporary Sculpture and Prints. In 1967, his prints were once again included in the Annual Exhibition put on by the Pennsylvania Academy of the Fine Arts.

He continued to work in a variety of media, including printmaking, but also painting, drawing, and sculpture. He began to favor sculpture as an artistic medium starting in the 1970s, and continued to use predominantly sculpture for the remainder of his career.

== List of notable works ==
- Didactic Dance, Print, 1964, located in the National Gallery of Art, Washington, D.C.
- Cruciform-Transfiguration, Sculpture, 1977, located at Holy Cross Church, Erie, PA.
- Eternal Vigilance, Sculpture, 1978, located at the Erie Art Museum, Erie, PA.
- Knifeman, Sculpture, 1986, located at the Wichita Art Museum, Wichita, Kansas.

== Eternal Vigilance ==
One of Deckard's most recognizable works is Eternal Vigilance, a large bronze sculpture that sits in front of the Erie Art Museum on State Street. It is in front of the Old Customs House, one of the five buildings that make up what is today the Erie Art Museum. The sculpture itself depicts "a moment of tortured humanity captured in 500 pounds of bronze". It is a larger-than-life-sized figure with disproportionately large hands and feet, curled up in fetal position, clutching himself, with a tortured expression on his face.

The sculpture was made using the ancient lost-wax casting method. In this method, the sculptor makes a full-size model of the sculpture in wax. From the wax, a plaster cast is then made, and the wax is melted out. Then, molten bronze is poured into the mold, and it assumes the shape of the wax. Finally, the plaster cast is removed, leaving behind the sculpture in bronze. The wax version of this sculpture was made from one-quarter-inch wax sheets, then the final touches were added by flame polishing. The final version of the wax sculpture weighed 50 pounds. It was taken to a foundry in Cleveland to be cast in bronze.

The piece was initially commissioned for the Erie Art Center on West 6th Street in 1978. In 1983, the Erie Art Center became the Erie Art Museum and moved to its current location on State Street, and the sculpture was installed in front of the museum, where it remains. It is a part of the Erie Art Museum's permanent collection.

== List of facilities holding Deckard's work ==
- National Gallery of Art
- Ackland Art Museum (connected with the University of North Carolina at Chapel Hill)
- Rose Art Museum (connected with Brandeis University)
- Cincinnati Art Museum
- Sheldon Swope Art Museum, in Terre Haute, Indiana
- DePauw University
- Wichita Art Museum
- Erie Art Museum
- Free Library of Philadelphia
- PPG Industries
- Holy Cross Roman Catholic Church, in Fairview, Erie County, Pennsylvania
