= Thomas B. Hagen =

American billionaire businessman

- Born: 1935 or 1936 (age 89–90)
- Education: Ohio State University
- Occupation: Businessman
- Title: Chairman, Erie Insurance Group
- Spouse: Susan Hirt (died 2015)
- Children: 2

Thomas Bailey Hagen (born 1935/1936) is an American billionaire businessman, the Chairman and former CEO of Erie Insurance Group, and the son-in-law of the company's founder. In 2023, his estimated net worth was $4.2 billion.

== Early life ==
Hagen was born circa 1935/1936. He attended Penn State Behrend from 1953 to 1955, and earned a bachelor's degree from Ohio State University in 1957.

== Career ==
As of 2018, Hagen has worked for Erie for over 40 years and is the chairman of Erie Insurance Group, having been its CEO from 1990 to 1993.

Hagen was Secretary of Commerce and then Secretary of Community & Economic Development for the state of Pennsylvania from January 1995 to March 1997.

== Personal life ==
Hagen was married to Susan Hirt Hagen (June 20, 1935 - June 15, 2015), the daughter of the co-founder Erie Insurance, H. O. Hirt. She was Erie's longest serving director. They had two children, Jonathan Hirt Hagen, and Sarah Hagen McWilliams.

Hagen lives in Erie, Pennsylvania.

== Philanthropy ==
In 2017, Hagen gave $1.5 million to Mercyhurst University's history department, which was renamed in his honour.

As of 2017, Hagen and Erie Insurance Group was involved in restoration efforts in Erie, Pennsylvania.
