= Chuck Rosenthal (author) =

American novelist and short story writer

- Occupations: Novelist, short story writer
- Spouse: Gail Wronsky
- Children: 1
- Writing career
- Pen name: C.P. Rosenthal

Chuck Rosenthal (sometimes writes as C.P. Rosenthal) is an American novelist and short story writer. Since the 1980s, he has published seven novels and a memoir. He is married to the poet Gail Wronsky and has one child, Marlena Rosenthal. He is a professor of English at Loyola Marymount University.

== Bibliography ==
=== Loop Trilogy ===
1. Loop's Progress (Hollyridge Press) ISBN 0-9772298-7-4
2. Experiments in Life and Deaf (Hollyridge Press) ISBN 0-9772298-8-2
3. Loop's End (Hollyridge Press) ISBN 0-9772298-9-0

=== Other Fiction ===
- Elena of the Stars (out of print) (Based on his daughter Marlena Rosentha)l ISBN 0-312-14592-6
- Jack Kerouac's Avatar Angel: His Last Novel (Hollyridge Press) ISBN 0-9676003-2-4
- My Mistress, Humanity (Hollyridge Press) ISBN 0-9676003-5-9
- Never Let Me Go: A Memoir (Red Hen Press) ISBN 1-888996-93-5
- The Heart of Mars (Hollyridge Press) (2007) ISBN 0-9772298-5-8 (sequel to My Mistress, Humanity)
- You Can Fly, A Sequel to the Peter Pan Tales (Hollyridge Press)l ISBN 978-1944856090
- The Legend of La Diosa, a novel (Letters at 3 a.m. Press) ISBN 978-0991464883
- The Shortest Farewells Are the Best, Noir Flash Fictions with Gail Wronsky (What Books Press) ISBN 978-0996227629
- Ten Thousand Heavens, a novel (Whitepoint Press) ISBN 978-0615744995
- Coyote O’Donohughe’s History of Texas, a novel (What Books Press) ISBN -978-0982354292

=== Nonfiction ===
- Never Let Me Go: A Memoir (Red Hen Press) ISBN 1-888996-93-5
- West of Eden: A Life in 21st Century Los Angeles (What Books Press) ISBN 978-0984578283
- Are We Not There Yet? Travels in Nepal, North India, and Bhutan (What Books Press) ISBN 978-0982354209
- Tomorrow You'll Be One of Us: Sci Fi Poems with Gail Wronsky (What Books Press) ISBN 978-0988924802
