= Erie Art Museum =

Art museum in Pennsylvania, U.S.

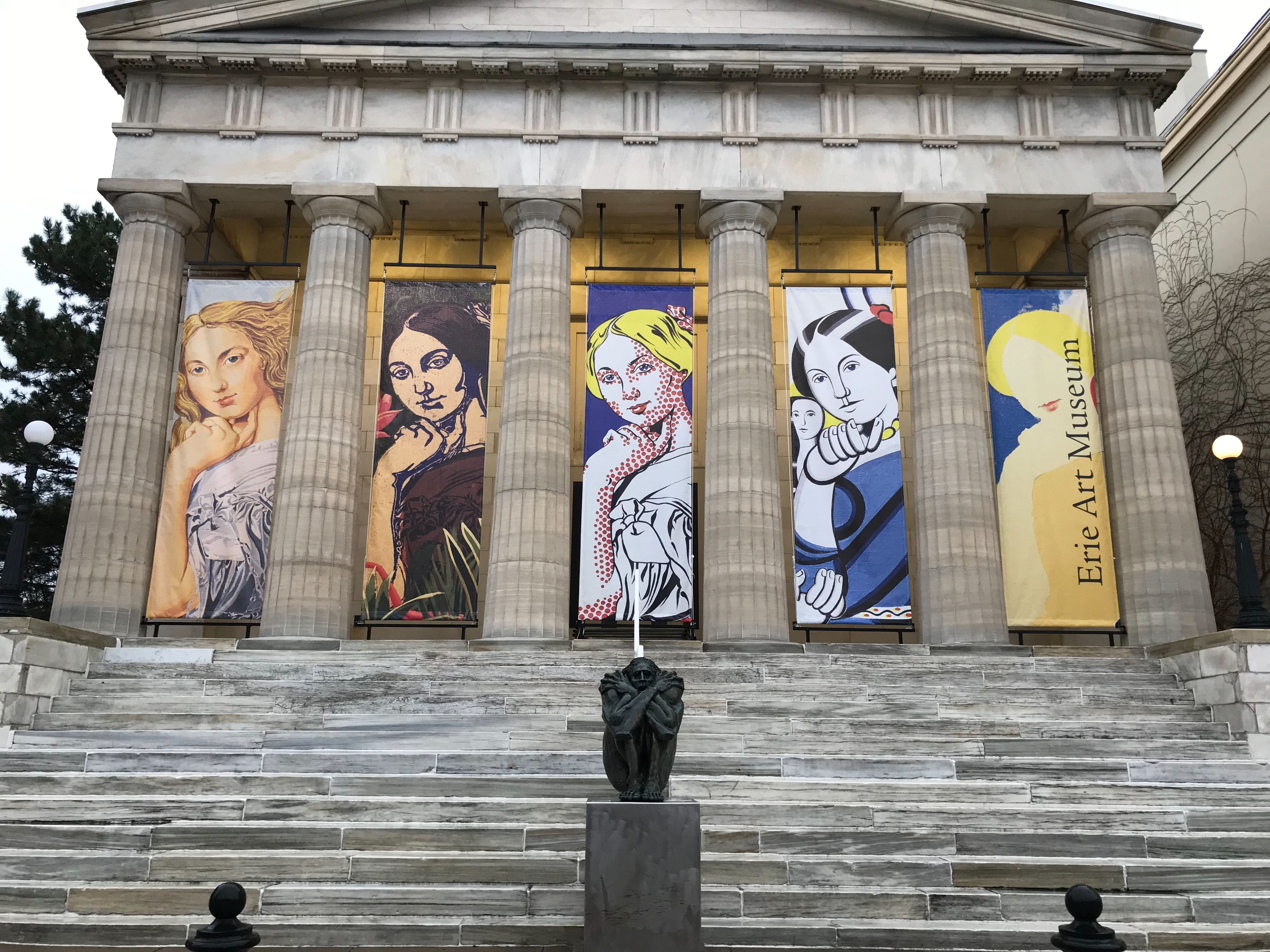
- Established: 1980, originally the Art Club of Erie est. 1898
- Location: 20 East 5th Street, Erie, Pennsylvania, US
- Coordinates: 42.130779°N 80.085319°W
- Type: Art Museum
- Visitors: 11,124 (2018/2019)
- Public transit access: EMTA Cultural Loop
- Website: erieartmuseum.org

Erie Art Museum is located in Erie, Pennsylvania. The Museum holds a collection of more than 8,000 objects, with strengths in American ceramics, Tibetan paintings, Indian bronzes, photography, and comic book art. Focusing on the museum collection, the main gallery features Everything but the Shelves; over a thousand objects hung salon-style. In addition to its collection, the museum hosts four to five visiting exhibitions annually.

Educational programs and artists' services, including interdisciplinary and interactive school tours and art classes for the community, are also available. The Museum coordinates Gallery Nights throughout the year, highlighting the art scene in Erie. Performing arts are showcased throughout the year during its After Hours and the popular summer program, Mid-Day Art Break, which represents national and international performers.

== Museum complex ==
In 2010, the Museum opened a new building that tied together five historic buildings into a single 80,000 sq ft (7,400 m^{2}) complex, providing a new entrance, tripling the public space, and providing new galleries, classrooms, and visitor amenities, such as a gift shop and café. The complex includes:

- The Old Custom House, a Greek Revival building constructed in 1837-39 of Vermont marble
- The Cashiers House, a Greek Revival townhouse also completed in 1839
- The Bonnell Block, a Greek Revival commercial building built in 1840 that houses the Erie Art Museum's Holstein Gallery
- The expansion, added in 2010.

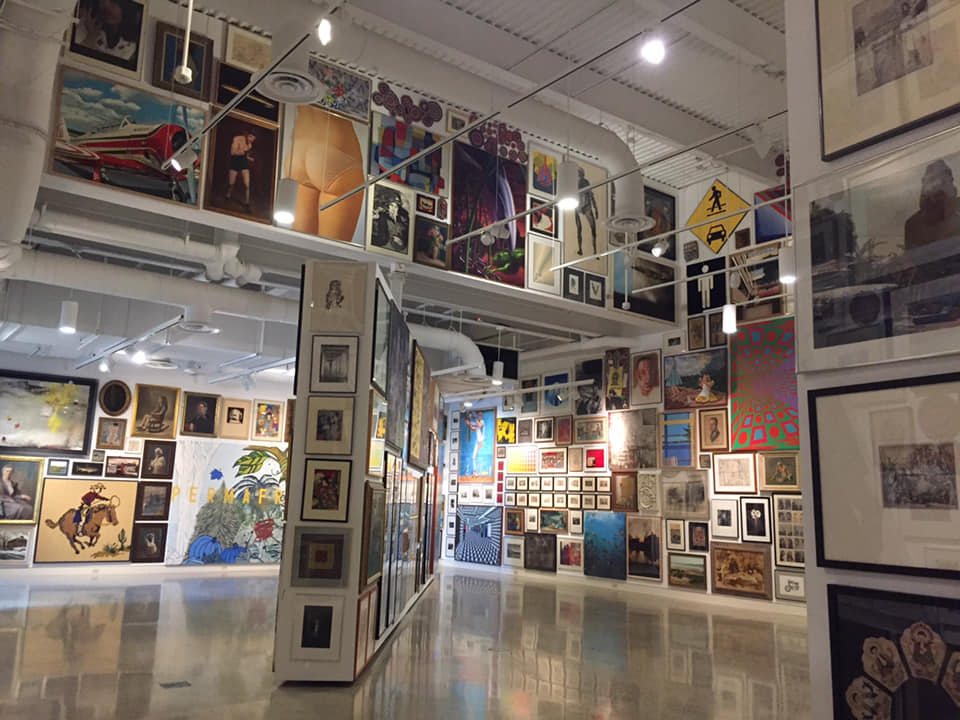
Everything but the Shelves, Salon hang of 1000 collection objects.

== History ==
The Erie Art Museum was founded in 1898 as The Art Club of Erie by a group of Erie artists led by Mrs. Lovisa Card-Catlin. The Art Club managed the Art Gallery located in the Public Library on Perry Square. In the 1940s, when the Art Club relocated, along with the Erie Public Museum (which had occupied the Library's basement), to the Watson-Curtze Mansion at 356 West Sixth Street. In 1956, the Art Club acquired the Wood-Morrison House, at 338 West Sixth Street, which, along with its carriage house, became known as the Art Center of Erie. Following a successful membership drive and the launch of the United Arts Fund Drive, the organization hired John L. Vanco as its director and first professional employee in 1968.

As the Erie Art Center, the organization expanded to include year-round exhibitions and education programs (1969), instituted an active program of collecting and a traveling exhibition program (1973), and added a darkroom (1973), frame shop (1975), and artist studios (1977).

Having outgrown the Sixth Street buildings, the organization created the ClaySpace ceramics studio (1981), a theater (1982), and artist studio rental spaces (1983) in the ArtWorks building at 1505 State Street. At the same time, the organization changed its name to Erie Art Museum and purchased the former Ashby Printing Company buildings at 423 State Street and 10 East 5th Street, which became known collectively as the Erie Art Museum Annex. The storefront at 423 State was developed to house the Frame Shop, including a small gallery facing the street. Later, the eastern portion of the first floor became a performance venue, and a classroom and gallery (2003) were added on the second floor.
