= Malchiodi =

Malchiodi is an Italian surname. Notable people with the surname include:

- Andrea Malchiodi (born 1972), an Italian mathematician
- Antonio Malchiodi (1848–1915), an Italian painter
- Alfred C. Malchiodi (1942–2011), an American engineer specializing in submarines
- Cathy Malchiodi (born 1953), American art therapist and academic
- Emilio Malchiodi (1922–1997), an Argentine athlete

== See also ==
- Asteroid 16091 Malchiodi
