= Willard Franklyn Searle =

US Navy ocean engineer and developer of diving and salvage equipment and systems

Willard Franklyn "Bill" Searle Jr.
- Born: January 17, 1924; Columbus, Ohio
- Died: March 31, 2009 (aged 85); Alexandria, Virginia
- Military career
- Allegiance: United States of America
- Branch: United States Navy
- Service years: 1945–1970
- Rank: Captain
- Awards: Legion of Merit

Capt. Willard Franklyn "Bill" Searle Jr. USN (ret.) (January 17, 1924 – March 31, 2009) was an American ocean engineer who was principally responsible for developing equipment and many of the current techniques utilized in United States Navy diving and salvage operations.

== Background ==
Searle was born January 17, 1924, in Columbus, Ohio. He graduated from Bexley High School in 1941 and received the school's Distinguished Alumni Award in 1992. The Japanese attack on Pearl Harbor occurred during his first year at Washington and Lee University prompting a transfer to the US Naval Academy where he graduated in 1945 (Class of 1946). In 1945, Searle marched with his Naval Academy Company to accompany the late President Franklin D. Roosevelt from Union Station to the White House. Searle then went on to graduate work in naval architecture at Massachusetts Institute of Technology attaining a master's degree in 1952. Later that year, Searle was assigned as an Engineering Duty Officer in salvage, diving and ocean engineering.

== Naval career ==
Willard Searle in 1969 wearing Standard Diving Dress

Searle's first diving experience came in 1946 while serving in the destroyer USS Meredith before transferring to the USS Weiss where he was introduced to Underwater Demolition Team techniques. Searle then trained at the Naval School of Diving and Salvage at the Washington Navy Yard, where he became a deep-sea helium-oxygen diving officer. He was then assigned to two tours at the Charleston Naval Shipyard.

From 1957 to 1959, he was actively evaluating equipment ranging from diving watches to closed circuit breathing apparatus design at the Navy Experimental Diving Unit.

Searle then served two years as Chief Engineer on the USS Providence before attending the Command and Staff Course of the Naval War College in Newport, Rhode Island, in 1961. Following two years as Pacific Fleet Salvage Officer in Pearl Harbor, Searle returned to Washington as the Navy Supervisor of Salvage. He served in this role from 1964 to 1969, where he established the Navy Directorate of Ocean Engineering.

As the Navy Supervisor of Salvage, Searle was responsible for the planning and buildup for the salvage and harbor clearance forces in South Vietnam, as well as many major salvage and deep ocean search and recovery projects such as the location of the sunken nuclear submarine USS Scorpion. He was also responsible for coordinating the recovery of the H-Bomb lost off Palomares, Spain as a part of Technical Advisory Group (TAG), Chaired by RADM L. V. Swanson. Speaking on the H-bomb recovery, Searle noted that "When you think about what we did, it had never been done before".

In 1968, Searle co-authored the first National Oil and Hazardous Materials Pollution Contingency Plan.

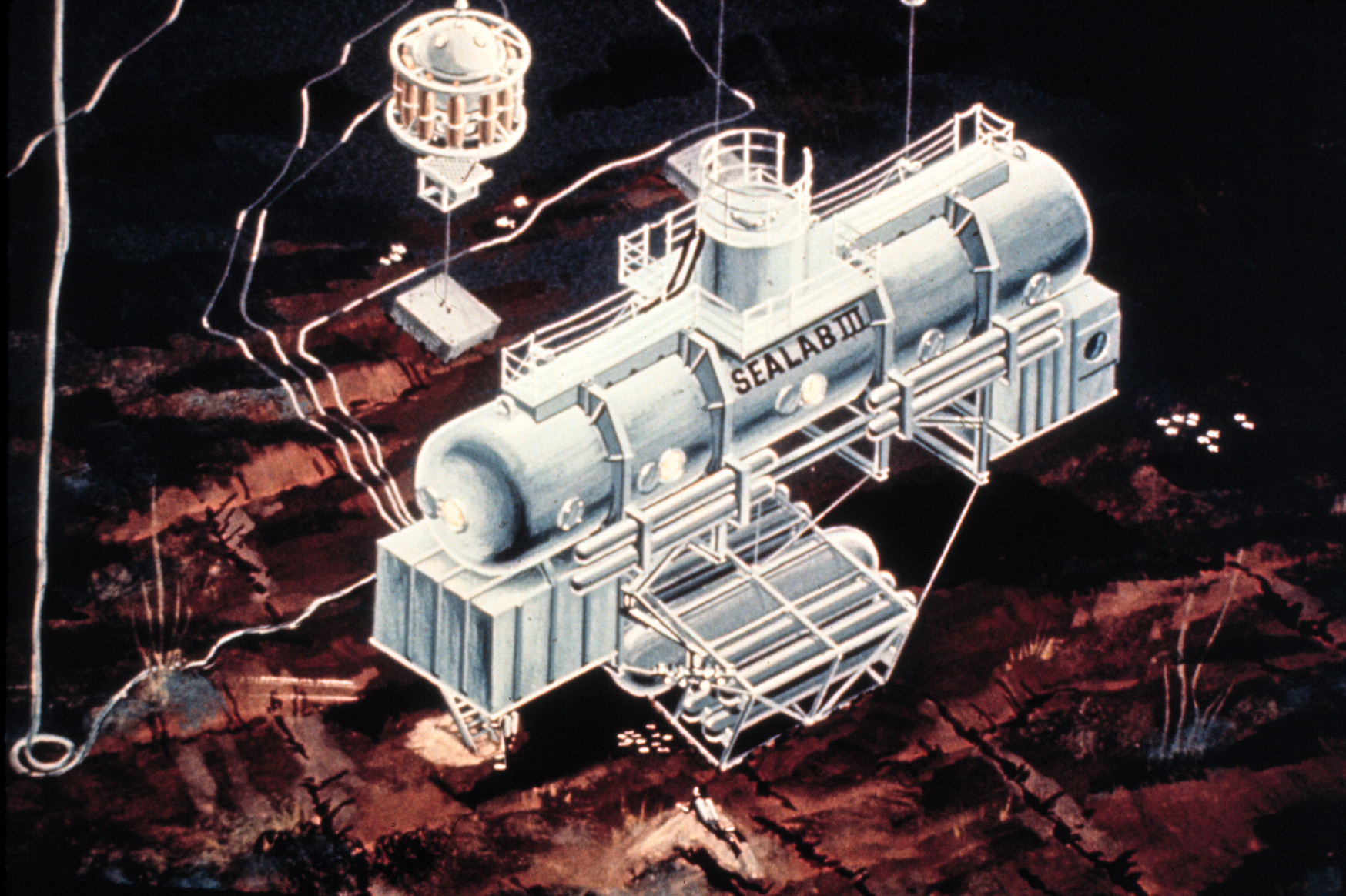
SEALAB III

Searle participated in SEALAB III, working with Dr. John Piña Craven, the U.S. Navy's head of the Deep Submergence Systems Project.

The Legion of Merit was awarded to Searle on February 24, 1970, by RADM Maurice H. Rindskopf with a citation that states "... CAPT Searle contributed more than any other individual since World War II to the high state of readiness which now exists in the Navy's salvage and diving organization.".

== Civilian career ==
Following his retirement in 1970, Searle founded a consulting firm, Searle Consortium Int. In 1971, Searle served as a special consultant in charge of removing shipwrecks from waterways during United Nations operations in Bangladesh. The Searle Consortium changed its name to MacKinnon-Searle Consortium in 1990 when Rear Admiral Malcolm MacKinnon USN (ret) joined the team. Searle also remained an active member of the marine salvage community by serving as an adviser on several committees.

Searle was a member of the American Society of Mechanical Engineers, the American Society of Naval Engineers, the Marine Technology Society, the Royal Institution of Naval Architects, and the Society of American Military Engineers. Searle helped found the American Institute of Nautical Archaeology. He also chaired the American National Standards Institute (ANSI) Committee to develop a standard addressing pressure vessels for human occupancy.

Searle became a member of the National Academy of Engineering in 1982.

The Harold E. Saunders Award was presented to Searle by the American Society of Naval Engineers in 1985.

Searle was awarded the 1986 Lockheed Martin Award for Ocean Science and Engineering by the Marine Technology Society.

In 1988, Special Recognition was awarded by the Undersea Medical Society for his continuing support of physiological and medical research in undersea development.

The potential for release of PCB in the salvage of the barge Irving Whale prompted the Canadian Government to contact Searle for evaluation of the aft lift cradle in 1996.

== Death ==
Searle died March 31, 2009, at his home in Alexandria, Virginia, of complications from Parkinson's disease. Searle's two marriages both ended in divorce. His survivors include three daughters from his first marriage, two stepdaughters from his second marriage, eight grandchildren; and three great-grandchildren. Searle is scheduled for interment with full military honors at Arlington National Cemetery on August 10, 2009.
