= John Niedermair =

American naval architect

John Charles Niedermair (1893–1982) was an American Naval architect whom the U.S. Naval Institute reports as being 'Among the most noted U.S. naval architects of [the 20th] century' and whom the American Society of Naval Engineers note as 'the father of today's modern United States Navy ships'. He worked in the U.S. Navy's Bureau of Ships from 1928 to 1958 during which time he directed the design of what were to become 8,000 ships, notably the Landing Ship, Tank. He received the U.S. Navy Distinguished Civilian Service Award; the Society of Naval Architects and Marine Engineers 1958 David W. Taylor Medal; the U.S. National Academy of Sciences 1976 Gibbs Brothers Medal; and the American Society of Naval Engineers 1978 Harold E. Saunders Award.
