= David W. Taylor =

American Naval officer

David Watson Taylor
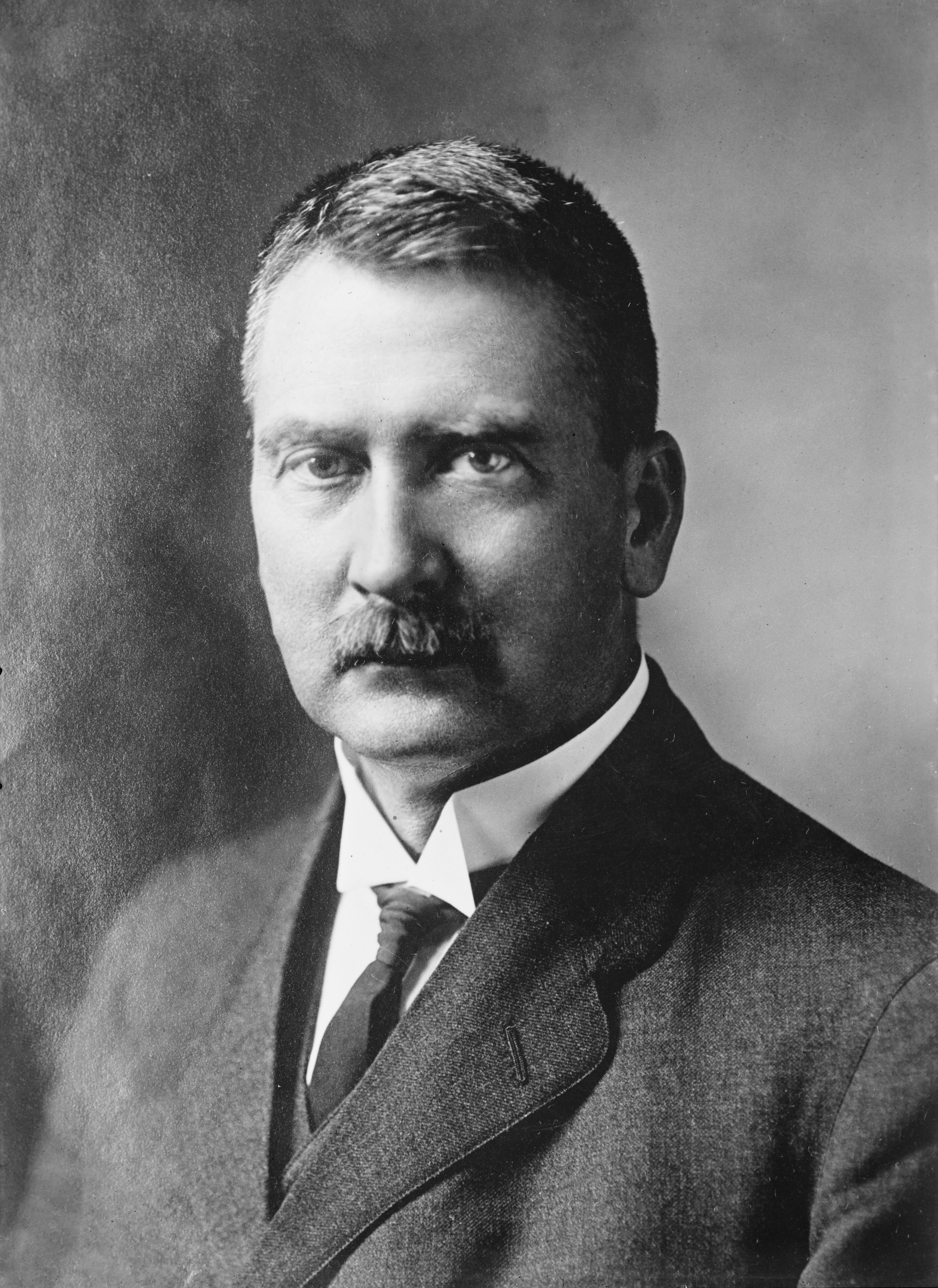
- Taylor in 1917
- Born: March 4, 1864; Louisa County, Virginia, C.S.
- Died: July 28, 1940 (aged 76); Washington, D.C., U.S.
- Military career
- Allegiance: United States of America
- Branch: United States Navy
- Rank: Rear admiral
- Awards: Distinguished Service Medal; Legion of Honor; John Fritz Medal; Franklin Medal (1917)

David Watson Taylor (March 4, 1864 – July 28, 1940) was an American naval architect and an engineer in the United States Navy. He served during World War I as Chief Constructor of the Navy, and Chief of the Bureau of Construction and Repair. Taylor is best known as the man who constructed the first experimental towing tank ever built in the United States.

== Early life and education ==
Taylor was born in Louisa County, Virginia, Confederate States of America. He entered the United States Naval Academy in 1881, after graduating from Randolph-Macon College where he was a member of Phi Kappa Psi. He graduated from the Academy in 1885 at the head of his class, setting a scholarship record, which still stands today. He was then sent to Greenwich England in 1885 to study naval architecture and construction on the Royal Corps of Naval Constructors course and received the highest honors of the Royal Naval College, Greenwich in 1888, again setting a record.

== Career ==
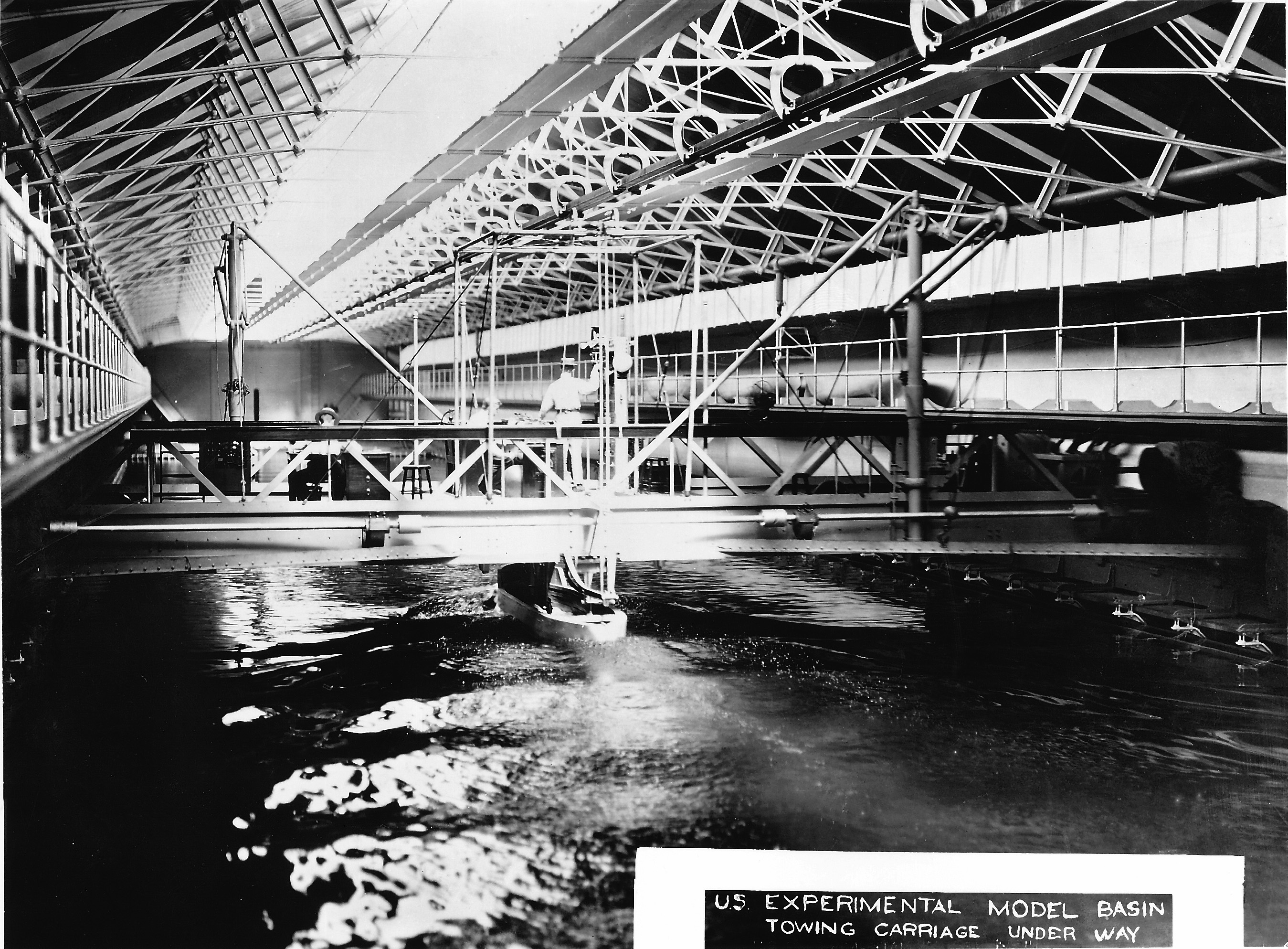
Experimental Model Basin, c. 1900

In August 1886, Taylor was appointed an assistant naval constructor. Early in his naval career he served on various stations and in 1909 acted as chief of the navy's Bureau of Construction and Repair. In 1895 he was the first American honored by award of a gold medal of the British Institute of Naval Architects.

In 1898 he constructed and had charge of the first experimental tank for models of war vessels built in the United States. He was connected with boards dealing with hull changes of naval vessels. In probably the greatest achievement of his career he created the "Taylor Standard Series" of 80 models with systematically varying proportions and prismatic coefficient. This series is still used for preliminary estimates of ship resistance for twin screw, moderate to high speed naval ships. The book was revised in 1933 with the addition of data on 40 new models. The series data was re-analyzed using more recent methods of evaluating friction resistance, and the results were published in 1954. Both "Speed and Power" and the Reanalysis were republished by the Society of Naval Architects and Marine Engineers in 1998, the centennial of the EMB.

The Taylor Standard series allows variation of the slenderness ratio, beam to draft ratio, and prismatic coefficient. While these are far from the only parameters that can be varied in a warship's hull design, it is possible to get a preliminary estimate of ship resistance from the series for essentially all warships, and many merchant ships, built since Taylor's time. Taylor's main contribution was to recognize that these three simple parameters were the critical ones for ship performance. A Taylor Standard Series estimate is accurate enough to plan the model test and to develop an idea of how much power will be required to achieve design speed, prior to model testing the actual hull form. Today the Taylor Standard Series has been programmed in electronic form and is used in several ship "synthesis models" to do feasibility studies for new ships.

After the RMS Titanic disaster of 1912, he was assigned to investigate the problem of making ships more seaworthy through better hull construction. On this duty, he served under the Secretary of Commerce and took a leading part in the International Conference on Safety at Sea, which grew out of the Titanic sinking.

=== Taylor as Chief Constructor of the Navy during World War I ===
On December 14, 1914, a few months after the outbreak of war in Europe, Taylor became chief of the Bureau of Construction and Repair, with the rank of rear admiral on December 14, 1914. He held that post throughout the war, along with the title of Chief Constructor of the Navy.

Taylor's active interest in aviation was stimulated by his appointment as a representative of the government on the National Research Council in 1916. In January, 1917, he was senior member of the Joint Army and Navy Technical Board for Design and Construction of a Zeppelin-type airship.

Through the World War, Taylor supervised the creation of numbers of new ships for naval service. For this work the navy bestowed upon him the Distinguished Service Medal, with the citation: "For exceptionally meritorious service in a duty of great responsibility as Chief of the Bureau of Construction and Repair." The French government made him a Commander of the Legion of Honor.

Taylor also aided in the development of the NC-type flying boat, the first aircraft to make a transatlantic flight.

Taylor remained the head of the Bureau of Construction and Repair until 1922.

=== Aeronautical activities post World War I ===
After his retirement from active service in 1923, Taylor focused his attention on aeronautics. He played a major role in promoting aviation's technical development, serving on several committees of the National Advisory Committee for Aeronautics (NACA), the precursor of the National Aeronautics and Space Administration. Taylor served as chairman of NACA's Subcommittee on Aeronautical Inventions and Designs after the subcommittee was organized in March 1927. Later that year, he was made chairman of the Subcommittee on Aerodynamics.

Long recognized as an international authority on naval architecture and marine engineering. Taylor applied the principles of hydrodynamics to the problem of aerodynamics. Following this new field of aviation, Taylor became one of the foremost authorities in the world in aerodynamics. He specialized on problems connected with the design of aircraft propellers and of seaplane floats and flying-boat hulls.

In 1931, Taylor was awarded the John Fritz Medal, the highest honor of the American engineering profession, "for outstanding achievement in marine architecture, for revolutionary results of persistent research in hull design, for improvements in many types of warships and for distinguished service as chief constructor for the United States Navy during the World War."

== Later life and death ==
Shortly before his death, the navy's Research and Development community honored Taylor by naming its new model basin after him. The new model basin constructed at Carderock, Maryland, the finest facility of its kind in the world, was dedicated as the David Taylor Model Basin in his presence in 1939. The Model Basin retains his name as a living memorial to this distinguished naval architect and marine engineer.

Taylor died in Washington, D.C., on July 28, 1940.

== Legacy ==
Taylor was influential in the development of the United States Navy's superiority. In addition to the Model Basin, the Navy has honored Taylor's legacy in several ways. In 1942 the destroyer David W. Taylor (DD-551) was named in his honor. The Navy's David W. Taylor Award recognizes outstanding scientific achievement, awarded for a contribution to the development of future maritime systems through the creation of technology based upon research. In 1907 he was conferred with Honorary Membership of the Institution of Engineers and Shipbuilders in Scotland.

The Society of Naval Architects and Marine Engineers awards the David W. Taylor Medal for "notable achievement in naval architecture and/or marine engineering."

The SS President Cleveland was intended to be named USS Admiral D. W. Taylor.
