= I10 =

I10, I-10 or i10 may refer to:

- Hyundai i10, a car
- Japanese submarine I-10, an Imperial Japanese Navy submarine
- Interstate 10, a highway in the United States
- i10-index, an academic index invented by Google

== See also ==
- ICD-10, a classification system for medical diagnoses and procedures
