= Edward L. Cochrane =

American Navy admiral (1892–1959)

Edward Lull Cochrane
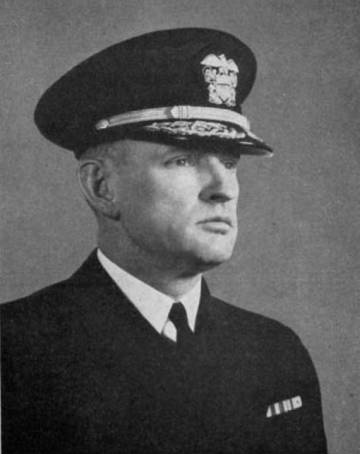
- Born: March 18, 1892; Mare Island, California, U.S.
- Died: November 14, 1959 (aged 67); New Haven, Connecticut, U.S.
- Relatives: Henry Clay Cochrane (father)
- Military career
- Allegiance: United States of America
- Branch: United States Navy
- Service years: 1910–1947
- Rank: Vice Admiral
- Commands: Bureau of Ships; Material Division
- Conflicts: World War I World War II
- Awards: Distinguished Service Medal; Knight Commander of the Order of the British Empire (honorary)
- Other work: Dean of MIT School of Engineering

Vice Admiral Edward Lull "Ned" Cochrane (March 18, 1892 – November 14, 1959) was a United States Navy officer and naval architect who served as Chief of the Bureau of Ships during World War II. In this capacity, he was directly responsible for the Navy's massive shipbuilding and maintenance program from November 1942 until November 1946.

== Naval career ==
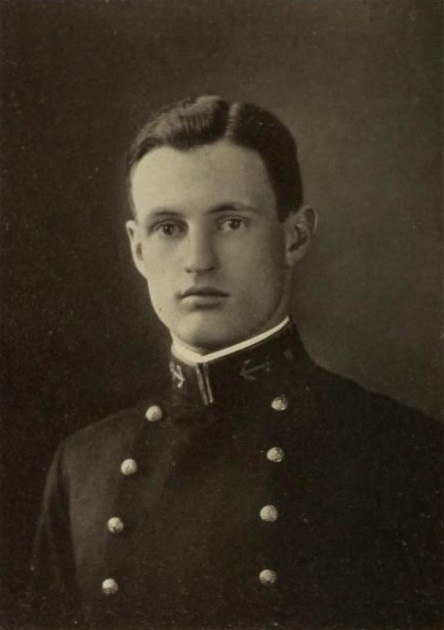
Cochrane as a Naval Academy midshipman

The son of retired Marine Brigadier General Henry Clay Cochrane (1842–1913), Edward Lull Cochrane was born at Mare Island, California in 1892. His family eventually settled in Chester, Pennsylvania. From 1909 to 1910, Cochrane attended the University of Pennsylvania. He entered the United States Naval Academy in 1910 and was commissioned as a Navy ensign upon graduating second of 154 in his class on June 5, 1914. After serving aboard the battleship Rhode Island for two years, Cochrane attended the Naval Postgraduate School in 1916.

During World War I, he served at Philadelphia Naval Shipyard and transferred to the Navy's Construction Corps. He graduated in 1920 from the Massachusetts Institute of Technology (MIT), with a Master of Science degree in Naval Architecture.

Between the World Wars, Cochrane served in various positions related to shipbuilding, including in the Navy's Bureau of Construction and Repair, predecessor to the Bureau of Ships. He attended the Naval War College in 1939 and was promoted to captain on July 1, 1940. Cochrane then served as assistant naval attaché at the U.S. Embassy in London.

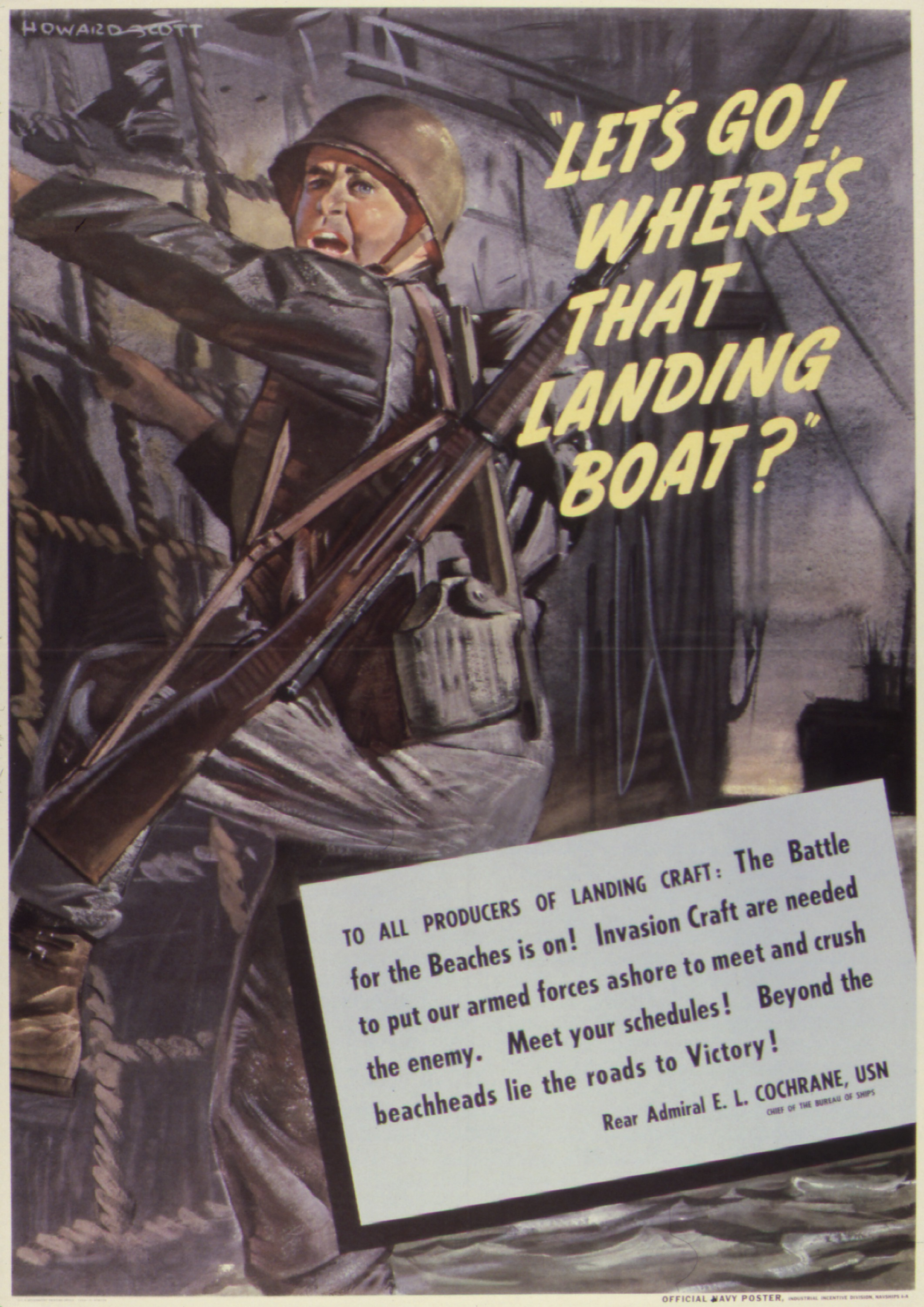
Quote from Edward L. Cochrane on World War II poster

He assumed the post of Chief, BuShips in November 1942, succeeding Rear Admiral Alexander H. Van Keuren. From January 1941 until assuming command of the bureau, Cochrane served as the Assistant Head of the Design Division. He was promoted to rear admiral effective November 1, 1942 and then to vice admiral on April 3, 1945. From 1946 to 1947, Cochrane served as Chief of the Material Division, Department of the Navy.

== Academic career ==
Cochrane retired from the navy in 1947, while serving as a member of the President's Advisory Committee on the Merchant Marine. He then joined the faculty of MIT, serving from 1947 to 1950 as head of the Department of Ocean Engineering (originally known as the Department of Naval Architecture), and from 1952 to 1954 as head of the School of Engineering.

From 1950 to 1952, Cochrane interrupted his academic career to serve as chairman of the Federal Maritime Board and head of the Maritime Administration for President Harry S. Truman.

== Last years and legacy ==
Vice Admiral Cochrane died in New Haven, Connecticut, on November 14, 1959, at the age of 67. After attending a meeting of the Society of Naval Architects and Marine Engineers in New York City, he suffered a heart attack during his train ride back to Boston and was taken to Grace–New Haven Hospital for treatment. Cochrane was interred at Arlington National Cemetery.

Many of Vice Admiral Cochrane's papers are held at the Naval Historical Center at the Washington Navy Yard in Washington, D.C. The papers include documents pertaining to the reorganization of the Bureau of Ships during World War II as well as transcripts of official speeches given by Admiral Cochrane during his term as head of that Bureau. Additionally, there are many personal papers and photographs relating to the Admiral's close association with civilian Naval Architecture and engineering organizations.

A small amount of related papers, focusing on his student years at MIT, are also available at the MIT Institute Archives and Special Collections.

=== Awards and honors ===
Cochrane received many awards and honors for his contributions to naval architecture, including the David W. Taylor Medal, and more generally to the field of engineering. He was a member of the National Academy of Sciences, and in 1953 received honorary membership in the American Society of Mechanical Engineers (ASME).

Cochrane was also awarded the Distinguished Service Medal, and was an honorary Knight Commander of the Order of the British Empire.

Cochrane was conferred an honorary LL.D. degree by Hahnemann Medical College in 1943, an honorary Ed.D. degree by the Polytechnic Institute of Brooklyn in 1946, an honorary Sc.D. degree by Tufts College in 1950 and a second honorary Ed.D. degree by the Stevens Institute of Technology in 1954.

MIT's Admiral Edward L. Cochrane Award is presented each year to an outstanding student athlete. The award goes to a male senior for demonstrating humility, leadership and inspiration in intercollegiate sports.

The USS Cochrane (DDG-21), a Charles F. Adams-class guided missile armed destroyer, was named in his honor.

Admiral Cochrane Drive in Annapolis was named in his honor. His two sons, Richard Lull Cochrane (March 7, 1917 – January 9, 1997) and Edward Lull Cochrane Jr. (July 17, 1922 – December 19, 2024), were also Naval Academy graduates who retired as Navy captains.
