= David W. Taylor Medal =

The David W. Taylor Medal is a medal presented by the Society of Naval Architects and Marine Engineers for "notable achievement in naval architecture and/or marine engineering."

The medal was named in honor of Rear Admiral David W. Taylor, USN. It is gold-plated bronze approximately 2.5 inches (6.25 cm) in diameter. One side portrays Admiral Taylor; the other contains an inscription.

Although named for the same person, the medal should not be confused with the David W. Taylor Award presented by the United States Navy for contributions to the development of future maritime systems.

== Recipients ==
Source: SNAME

- 1936 David Watson Taylor
- 1938 William Le Roy Emmet
- 1939 Hugo P. Frear
- 1940 John F. Metten
- 1942 Samuel M. Robinson
- 1943 William Hovgaard
- 1945 Edward L. Cochrane
- 1946 William Francis Gibbs
- 1947 David Arnott
- 1948 Earle W. Mills
- 1949 George G. Sharp
- 1950 Harold E. Saunders
- 1951 C. Richard Waller
- 1953 John E. Burkhardt
- 1954 Edwin L. Stewart
- 1955 Kenneth S.M. Davidson
- 1956 Andrew I. McKee
- 1957 David P. Brown
- 1958 John C. Niedermair
- 1959 Olin J. Stephens II
- 1960 Glenn B. Warren
- 1961 Mark L. Ireland Jr.
- 1962 Charles D. Wheelock
- 1963 Arthur D. Gatewood
- 1964 Henry A. Schade
- 1965 John P. Comstock
- 1966 Richard B. Couch
- 1967 Wilson D. Leggett Jr.
- 1968 Matthew G. Forrest
- 1969 Douglas C. MacMillan
- 1970 Ludwig C. Hoffmann
- 1971 Phillip Eisenberg
- 1972 John R. Kane
- 1973 Jerome L. Goldman
- 1974 Roger E.M. Brard
- 1975 James B. Robertson Jr.
- 1976 Henry Benford
- 1977 James J. Henry
- 1978 John J. Nachtsheim
- 1979 Philip F. Spaulding
- 1980 Peter M. Palermo
- 1981 Erwin Carl Rohde
- 1982 Jacques B. Hadler
- 1983 Jens T. Holm
- 1984 Jan D. Van Manen
- 1985 J. Randolph Paulling Jr.
- 1986 Robert N. Herbert
- 1987 John B. Caldwell
- 1988 Lawrence R. Glosten
- 1989 Clark Graham
- 1990 Lorenzo Spinelli
- 1991 Douglas Faulkner
- 1992 Justin E. Kerwin
- 1993 Harry A. Jackson
- 1994 Robert P. Giblon
- 1995 John W. Boylston
- 1996 Roy L. Harrington
- 1997 George R. Knight Jr.
- 1998 Thomas S. Winslow
- 1999 Robert J. Scott
- 2000 Thomas G. Lang
- 2001 Peter A. Gale
- 2002 R. Keith Michel
- 2003 Robert G. Keane Jr.
- 2004 Donald Liu
- 2005 Robert G. Allan
- 2006 Edward N. Comstock
- 2009 Joseph P. Fischer
- 2010 Peter Tang-Jensen
- 2012 Kirsi Tikka
- 2013 Jeom Kee Paik
- 2014 Howard Fireman
- 2017 John C. Daidola
- 2018 Frederick Stern
- 2019 Jeffrey J. Hough
- 2021 David Andrews
- 2022 Barry Tibbitts
- 2023 Thomas C. Fu
- 2024 John W. Waterhouse

== See also ==
- List of engineering awards
- Prizes named after people
