= Henry Schade (officer) =

United States Navy admiral (1900–1992)

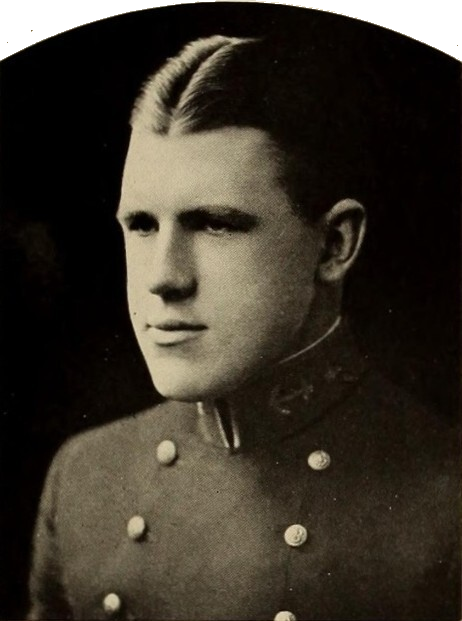
- Schade at a Naval Academy in 1923
- Born: December 3, 1900; Saint Paul, Minnesota, U.S.
- Died: August 12, 1992 (aged 91); Kensington, California, U.S.
- Burial place: Arlington National Cemetery
- Spouse: Alice Houseman (died 1990)
- Children: 3
- Military career
- Allegiance: United States
- Branch: United States Navy
- Service years: 1919–1949
- Rank: Commodore
- Conflicts: World War II
- Awards: Legion of Merit (2); Gibbs Brothers Medal (1970)

Henry Adrian Schade (December 3, 1900 – August 12, 1992) was an officer in the United States Navy. He worked as a naval architect, director of the Institute of Engineering Research, and professor of mechanical engineering at the University of California, Berkeley.

During World War II, Schade headed the carrier desk for the United States Navy's Bureau of Ships. He helped develop the Essex-class carriers, which were commissioned near the end of the war. Schade also oversaw their accelerated construction.

Near the end of the war, Schade served as Chief of the United States Naval Technical Mission in Europe.

== Early life and education ==
Schade was born in Saint Paul, Minnesota, and attended Central High School. In 1919, he was appointed to the United States Naval Academy by the U.S. congressman from Minnesota's Fourth District.

In 1923, Schade graduated from the Naval Academy with distinction and ranked seventh in his class of 414. He was commissioned as an ensign in the United States Navy and assigned to the battleship USS California (BB-44), where he served as a communication watch officer.

In May 1925, Schade began postgraduate studies in naval architecture at the Naval Academy's Postgraduate School in Annapolis, Maryland. In 1926, he joined the Construction Corps and continued his education at the Massachusetts Institute of Technology (MIT), earning his degree in naval architecture in June 1928. His master's thesis, Deformations and Stresses in Pipe Bends, advised by William Hovgaard, was published later that year by MIT's Department of Naval Construction.

== Early naval career ==
After graduating from MIT, Schade was briefly stationed at the Edgewood Arsenal in Maryland and then at the Brooklyn Navy Yard in New York City. From October 1928, and for the three succeeding years, Schade served in the industrial department at Mare Island Navy Yard, California. In December 1931, Schade joined the Design Section within the Bureau of Construction and Repair. He was later promoted to lieutenant. He furthered the development of the use of welding in naval ship construction until January 1935.

Schade was then assigned to the Experimental Model Basin at the Washington Navy Yard. Detached from the Model Basin in July 1936, he was ordered overseas to attend the Technische Hochschule Berlin-Charlottenburg. In June 1937, Schade received the degree of Doctor of Engineering in naval architecture for his research on the strength of ship structures and his dissertation entitled Statik des Schiff-Bodens unter Wasserdruck. An English translation by Schade was published as Theory of Motions of Craft in Waves.

Lieutenant Schade was then assigned to the Office of the Superintending Constructor, later re-designated as the Office of the Supervisor of Shipbuilding, at the Newport News Shipbuilding and Dry Dock Company in Virginia. On June 23, 1938, less than one year into his assignment at Newport News, he was promoted to lieutenant commander. That summer, the Society of Naval Architects and Marine Engineers (SNAME) published Schade's paper on his study of Bending Theory of Ship Bottom Structure.

== World War II ==
After the attack on Pearl Harbor, the chief of the Bureau of Ships, Rear Admiral Samuel M. "Mike" Robinson, and deputy chief, Rear Admiral Alexander H. Van Keuren, recognized that the United States would require more and better-equipped aircraft carriers to fight a maritime war effectively. In the weeks following the attack, orders were sent to ships and stations worldwide to recall personnel for reassignment, including Commander Schade. In late December 1941, Schade was detached from his role as SNLO at Newport News and, by January 1, 1942, reassigned to the Bureau of Ships.

Following his reassignment, Schade was responsible for the design of the Midway-class carriers. His innovations included using the flight deck as a structural element, replacing the original wooden platforms mounted above the ship's hull. Schade received a temporary promotion to captain, effective May 1, 1943.

Schade was awarded the Legion of Merit for his work as head of the Carrier Desk during World War II.

In mid-1944, Schade was sent to Europe as part of the Alsos Mission to evaluate captured German technology and investigate evidence of nuclear weapons research. The other three naval officers selected for the mission, all with engineering and foreign language expertise, were Captains Jacob Pieter Den Hartog, Albert G. Mumma, and Wendell P. Roop. On December 23, 1944, Schade was promoted to the rank of commodore.

In January 1945, Commodore Schade was ordered to report to the office of the Chief of Naval Operations for a special reassignment. He was tasked with creating and leading a team of scientific and technical specialists to secure German science and technology. Schade initially headquartered the mission in Paris, but the location proved impractical as the team moved frequently with the advancing Allied forces. By September 1945, the mission had expanded to nearly 900 naval personnel and civilians. German submarine technology was found to be of especially high value.

== Post-War ==
Following the war, Schade was awarded a Gold Star in lieu of a second Legion of Merit.

Schade also received the American Defense Service Medal, European-African-Middle Eastern Campaign Medal, American Campaign Medal, and World War II Victory Medal. The government of Great Britain appointed him an honorary officer in the military division of the Most Excellent Order of the British Empire.

On November 1, 1945, Schade was appointed director of the Naval Research Laboratory at Anacostia.

== Teaching career ==
Upon retirement, Schade was appointed professor of mechanical engineering and director of research for the University of California College of Engineering at Berkeley.

In 1950, he translated his doctoral dissertation into English as Theory of Motions of Craft in Waves. Schade lectured at Berkeley and served as the department's first chair.

He was awarded the David W. Taylor Medal in 1964 and the Gibbs Brothers Medal from the National Academy of Sciences in 1970. Schade was elected to the National Academy of Engineering in 1973.

== Retirement, family, and death ==
Commodore Schade retired from Berkeley in 1968. After retirement, he served as a visiting professor at Istanbul Technical University and at Technische Universität Berlin.

Schade and his wife, Alice Houseman, had two sons, Henry A. Schade Jr. and Richard J. Schade, and a daughter, Suzanne, who died in 1932. Alice Houseman died in 1990. Commodore Henry Adrian Schade passed away on August 12, 1992, in Kensington, California. Schade, his wife, and their daughter are interred at Arlington National Cemetery.

== Decorations ==
Commodore Henry Adrian Schade's ribbon bar:

1st Row	Legion of Merit with Gold Star	American Defense Service Medal	American Campaign Medal
2nd Row	European-African-Middle Eastern Campaign Medal with one service star	World War II Victory Medal	Honorary Officer of the Most Excellent Order of the British Empire
