= American Society of Naval Engineers =

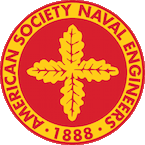
- Founded: 1888
- Type: Professional Society
- Purpose: "to advance the knowledge and practice of naval engineering in public and private applications and operations, to enhance the professionalism and well-being of members, and to promote naval engineering as a career field."
- Region served: Worldwide
- Method: Conferences, Publications, Networking, Outreach
- Members: 3,000+
- Key people: RADM Mark Hugel, USN, Ret. (President) CAPT Dale Lumme, USN, Ret. (Executive Director)
- Website: www.navalengineers.org

The American Society of Naval Engineers (ASNE) is a professional association of naval engineers. Naval Engineering includes all arts and sciences as applied in the research, development, design, construction, operation, maintenance, and logistic support of surface and subsurface ships and marine craft; naval and maritime auxiliaries; aviation and space systems; combat systems including command and control, electronics, and ordnance systems; ocean structures; and associated shore facilities which are used by naval and other military forces and civilian maritime organizations. ASNE's membership consists of military and civilian engineering professionals, defense industry engineers, academics, and engineering students.

ASNE is headquartered in Alexandria, Virginia.

== History ==
Founding

Established September 30, 1888; founding members met at the Bureau of Steam Engineering in Washington DC. Shortly thereafter Nathan P. Towne was elected the Society's first president. In the years to follow, ASNE membership expanded beyond its initial roots within the United States Navy engineering duty officer community to include United States Coast Guard, Marine Corps, Army, and civilian engineers.

Logo

The ASNE logo was first approved by the Council in January 1897 and it was based on the uniform insignia worn at the time by officers of the U.S. Navy Engineering Corps – the community that had founded the Society in 1888. At that time the Engineering Corps was a staff corps and the stripes worn on the sleeves of their blue service dress uniforms were gold stripes with red cloth between the stripes, and the staff insignia that they wore was four oak leaves arranged in a cross. Subsequently, in 1899 the Engineering Corps was discontinued and those officers were made Line Officers, restricted to Engineering Duty Only, in order to better integrate their rank structure with officers of the Unrestricted Line. Thus their uniform insignia became the same as the Unrestricted Line – gold stripes on the blue uniform background with gold star insignia. However, ASNE retained the original design for the logo in recognition of its heritage.

== Symposia and Technical Discussions ==
The following is a listing of technical meetings hosted by ASNE for the greater Naval Engineering community.

Symposia	Frequency	Typical Venue
Technology Systems and Ships (formerly ASNE Day)	Annual (February/March)	DC Metro Area
Advanced Machinery Technology Symposium	Biennial (April/May)	Philadelphia Metro Area
Intelligent Ships Symposium	Biennial (April/May)	Philadelphia Metro Area
Multi-Agency Craft Conference (MACC)	Biennial (Summer)	JEB Little Creek/Ft Story or USCG Yard
MegaRust	Annual (June)	San Diego/Hampton Roads alternating years
Fleet Maintenance and Modernization Symposium	Annual (July/August)	San Diego/Hampton Roads alternating years
Naval Future Force Science and Technology Expo (co-sponsored with ONR)	Biennial	DC Metro Area
Arctic Day	Annual (November)	DC Metro Area
Launch and Recovery Symposium	Biennial (December)	Baltimore Metro Area
Combat Systems Symposium	Annual (December)	Washington Navy Yard

== Publications ==
Journal

The Naval Engineers Journal (NEJ) is published quarterly by ASNE. It is distributed to all ASNE members, and subscription is available to non-members. The NEJ is a medium for technical papers in the field of naval engineering. It also contains schedules of meetings, symposia, and other events, news, notes, and membership information. The Society invites both members and non-members to submit manuscripts of previously unpublished papers to the Journal Editor. Papers on the full range of subjects of interest to naval engineers are welcome.

Papers

ASNE hosts many symposia throughout the year focused on combat systems, autonomy, cyber security, fleet maintenance and modernization, corrosion mitigation, small craft, and future programs. Papers, presentations and other outputs of the meeting are archived and made available for purchase.

Books

History of American Naval Dry Docks, CAPT Rick Hepburn, PE, USN (Ret.), 2003

Marine Casualty Response: Salvage Engineering, various, 1999

Naval Engineering and American Seapower, RADM Millard Firebaugh, USN (Ret.) ed., 2000

== Sections ==
Section	Area
Central Gulf Coast	New Orleans, Louisiana
Delaware Valley	Philadelphia-Southern New Jersey-Delaware
Flagship; USNA Student Section; VA Tech Student Section; Dahlgren/Rappahannock Chapter	Washington-Baltimore-Northern Virginia; Annapolis, Maryland; Blacksburg, Virginia; Dahlgren, Fredericksburg, Rappahannock
Jacksonville	Jacksonville, Florida area
Metropolitan	New York-Northern New Jersey
Northern New England	Northern New England area
Pascagoula	Pascagoula, Mississippi area
Puget Sound	Bremerton-Seattle-Tacoma
San Diego	San Diego, California area
Southern Indiana	Central Indiana Area
Tidewater; ODU Student Section; Wallops Island Chapter	Norfolk, Virginia Beach, Newport News, Chesapeake, Suffolk, and Wallops Island

== Notable members ==
- Claud A. Jones
- Wayne E. Meyer
- William B. Morgan
- George "Pete" Nanos
- Ronald Rábago
- Hyman G. Rickover
- Harold E. Saunders

== See also ==
- Naval architecture
- Shipbuilding
- Classification society
- International Maritime Organization
- Royal Institution of Naval Architects
- Society of Naval Architects and Marine Engineers
- Marine architecture
