= SS Gulfwave =

US tanker ship

History

United States
- Name: SS Gulfwave
- Owner: Gulf Oil Corporation (Pennsylvania)
- Yard number: 4324
- Launched: 9 October 1937
- Completed: 1 December 1937 (delivery)
- Identification: Official Number: 236882; Signal letters: WPPL
- Fate: Sold 1956

Liberia
- Name: SS Michael J.
- Owner: Unknown
- Acquired: 1956
- Fate: Scrapped 1959

General characteristics
- Tonnage: 11,381 DWT; 7,140 GRT; 4,381 net
- Length: 442 ft (134.7 m) LOA; 426.4 ft (130.0 m) registered length
- Beam: 64.2 ft (19.6 m)
- Draft: 27 ft 6 in (8.4 m) design draft
- Depth: 34 ft (10.4 m)
- Installed power: General Electric double reduction geared turbines, 3,000 shaft horsepower
- Speed: 12 kn (14 mph; 22 km/h).
- Capacity: 83,836 barrels
- Crew: 42

SS Gulfwave was a Gulf Oil Corporation tanker that operated from 1937 to 1956. She was torpedoed during World War II but returned to service after repairs. From 1956 to 1959 she operated as the Liberian Michael J.

== Construction ==
Bethlehem Steel Company at Sparrows Point, Maryland. She was launched on 9 October 1937 as the third of four tankers built at Sparrows Point for Gulf Oil. The construction made greater use of welding than in the previous two tankers of the series. She was delivered to Gulf Oil on 1 December 1937.

== Characteristics ==
Gulfwave was 442 feet (134.7 m) in length overall, 426.4 feet (130 m) in registered length, 64.2 feet (19.6 m) in beam, and had a design draft of 27 feet 6 inches (8.4 m). Propulsion was by a set of General Electric double-reduction geared turbines, developing about 3,000 shaft horsepower (2,237 kW), driving a single 17-foot-6-inch (5.3 m) propeller for a maximum speed of about 12 knots (22 km/h; 14 mph).

== Service history ==
Gulfwave operated with the Gulf Oil fleet until taken by the War Shipping Administration for World War II service on 20 April 1942. Gulf Oil subsequently operated her under an agreement with the United States Army, revised to a time charter on 29 June 1944. After the war, the ship returned to company operations on 20 November 1945.

On 1 March 1943 the ship was torpedoed by the Imperial Japanese Navy submarine I-10 under the command of Commander Kinzo Tonozuka in the New Hebrides south of Tonga at 20°30′S 174°45′E. Gulfwave suffered no casualties among her merchant mariners or United States Navy Armed Guard personnel, and she arrived at Suva in Fiji under her own power. After temporary repairs at Suva, Gulfwave arrived at Pago Pago in American Samoa on 29 March 1943 for further repairs. She departed Pago Pago on 13 May 1943 bound for Hawaii. Permanent repairs were made at Portland, Oregon.

Gulfwave was sold to Liberian interests in January 1956, renamed Michael J., and was scrapped in 1959.
