= Keith Tantlinger =

American mechanical engineer and inventor (1919–2011)

Keith Walton Tantlinger
- Tantlinger in 1958
- Born: March 22, 1919; Orange, California
- Died: August 27, 2011 (aged 92); Escondido, California
- Education: University of California, Berkeley
- Occupation: Mechanical engineer
- Known for: Intermodal container
- Spouses: Marjorie Cunningham; Wanda Mae Gunnell Delinger
- Awards: Gibbs Brothers Medal

Keith Walton Tantlinger (March 22, 1919 – August 27, 2011) was a mechanical engineer and inventor. As Vice President of Engineering at the Fruehauf Trailer Corporation his inventions played a major role in containerization. Working with a Fruehauf customer, Malcom McLean, they spearheaded the container ship revolution in the 1950s, Tantlinger developed much of the early technology that made modern container shipping possible while at Fruehauf. After its initial order of containers from Brown Trailer, Sea-Land switched to containers made by the Strick division of the Fruehauf Trailer Company. Fruehauf had been one of the dominant players in building truck bodies and trailers for a long time, and, as already described, had previously innovated in the design and construction of the early commercial semi-trailers. President Roy Fruehauf was impressed with the idea of containerization, so in addition to manufacturing containers for Sea-Land his company agreed to make the trailer chassis that were needed, and also to provide financing to Sea-Land for the purchase of these containers and chassis.

In 1958 Tantlinger left Sea-Land and became chief engineer at Fruehauf, where he continued to work with containers. More importantly, over the years he played a key role in the process of container standardization, working extensively on a committee of the American Standards Association (ASA) and later being critically involved with the ISO's efforts. His designs included the corner casting and Twistlock systems found on every intermodal container, the spreader bar for automatic securing of containers lifted on and off ships, and the ship-shore container transfer apparatus for the first cellular container ship. In the course of his professional career, Tantlinger was granted 79 United States patents, all related to transportation equipment. Many of his patents related to commercial highway freight trailers and transit buses.

== Life and career ==
Tantlinger was born in Orange, California, on March 22, 1919. He attended the University of California, Berkeley, where he earned a bachelor's degree in mechanical engineering in 1941. During World War II, he worked for the Douglas Aircraft Company (later McDonnell Douglas), where he designed tools used to produce the B-17 bomber.

He married Marjorie Cunningham. They had a daughter, Susan Tantlinger, and they later divorced.

In the 1950s, Tantlinger persuaded McLean that shipping containers should be built so they could be separated from a chassis, with strong corner posts and built so they could be stacked on top of each other.

Tantlinger also worked on the basic structure and many features of the Bay Area Rapid Transit cars for San Francisco and the rapid transit cars for the Washington Metropolitan Area Transportation Authority.

During his career he also worked as chief engineer and vice president of engineering at Brown Trailers in Spokane; vice president of engineering and manufacturing at Fruehauf Corporation in Detroit; and senior vice president, ground transportation systems at Rohr Industries in Chula Vista, California.

On September 10, 1981, he married Wanda Mae Gunnell Delinger in Las Vegas, Nevada.

In 2010, Tantlinger was awarded the Gibbs Brothers Medal by the National Academy of Sciences for his role in developing the expansion of world trade.

He died in Escondido, California, on August 27, 2011, age 92.
