= Gibbs Brothers Medal =

Naval architecture and marine engineering award

The Gibbs Brothers Medal is awarded by the U.S. National Academy of Sciences for "outstanding contributions in the field of naval architecture and marine engineering". It was established by a gift from William Francis Gibbs and Frederic Herbert Gibbs.

== Recipients ==
- Admiral Frank L. Brown (2022)
  - For lifelong marine engineering innovation of nuclear-powered warships and leadership in Navy and commercial maritime safety culture.
- Jerome H. Milgram (2017)
  - For wide-ranging original contributions to naval architecture in theoretical hydromechanics, education, yacht design, environmental protection, and the practical arts of ocean systems.
- Robert G. Keane, Jr. (2012)
  - For continued excellence as a naval architect over many years, exemplified by the outstanding naval warships that he had a major part in designing, helping to make the U.S. Navy the most powerful in the world.
- Keith W. Tantlinger (2009)
  - For his visionary and innovative design of the cellular container ship and supporting systems that transformed the world's shipping fleet and facilitated the rapid expansion of global trade.
- Donald Liu (2006)
  - For first introducing finite element techniques into ship design and being the driving force behind the revolution in basing classification society rules on scientific principles.
- Alfred C. Malchiodi (2003)
  - For leading innovations in developing the naval architecture of submarines for the efficient utilization of advanced technology.
- Edward E. Horton (2001)
  - For visionary and innovative concept development and design of off-shore platforms, mooring systems, and related technology that have significantly influenced development of deep-water operations.
- Justin E. Kerwin (1999)
  - For his outstanding contributions in the field of naval architecture, including the development of computational methods used worldwide in propeller design.
- William B. Morgan (1997)
  - For his technical leadership in improving performance, quieting, and design of advanced marine propulsion systems, and development of large modern propulsion research and testing facilities.
- Owen H. Oakley (1995)
  - For his significant contributions to the field of naval architecture, especially in the design of naval ships, submarines, and advanced ship types and submersibles.
- Olin J. Stephens II (1993)
  - For his design of outstanding sailing vessels, including six defenders of the America's Cup and thousands of ocean-racing yachts, and for promoting the use of scientific knowledge and research in the field of naval architecture.
- Bruce G. Collipp (1991)
  - For his invention of the semisubmersible, offshore, floating drilling platform, and for his sustained pioneering leadership in devising innovative ocean-engineering technologies.
- Leslie A. Harlander (1988)
  - For his pioneering effort in the design of specialized vessels and cargo-handling equipment associated with * intermodal shipping by container systems.
- Matthew Galbraith Forrest (1979)
- John Charles Niedermair (1976)
  - For his outstanding contributions to the field of naval architecture and marine engineering.
- Phillip Eisenberg (1974)
  - For his work that is the basis of much of what is known about hydrofoils and how ships move smoothly.
- Henry A. Schade (1970)
  - For his outstanding contributions in the design, construction, and performance of ships.
- Alfred Adolf Heinrich Kiel (1967)
  - For his outstanding contributions in the field of naval architecture and marine engineering.
- Frederick Henry Todd (1965)
  - For his contributions to the theory of ship design through model experiments, and for his leadership in hydrodynamic research.

== See also ==
- List of engineering awards
- List of awards named after people
