= USS Cochrane =

Charles F. Adams-class destroyer

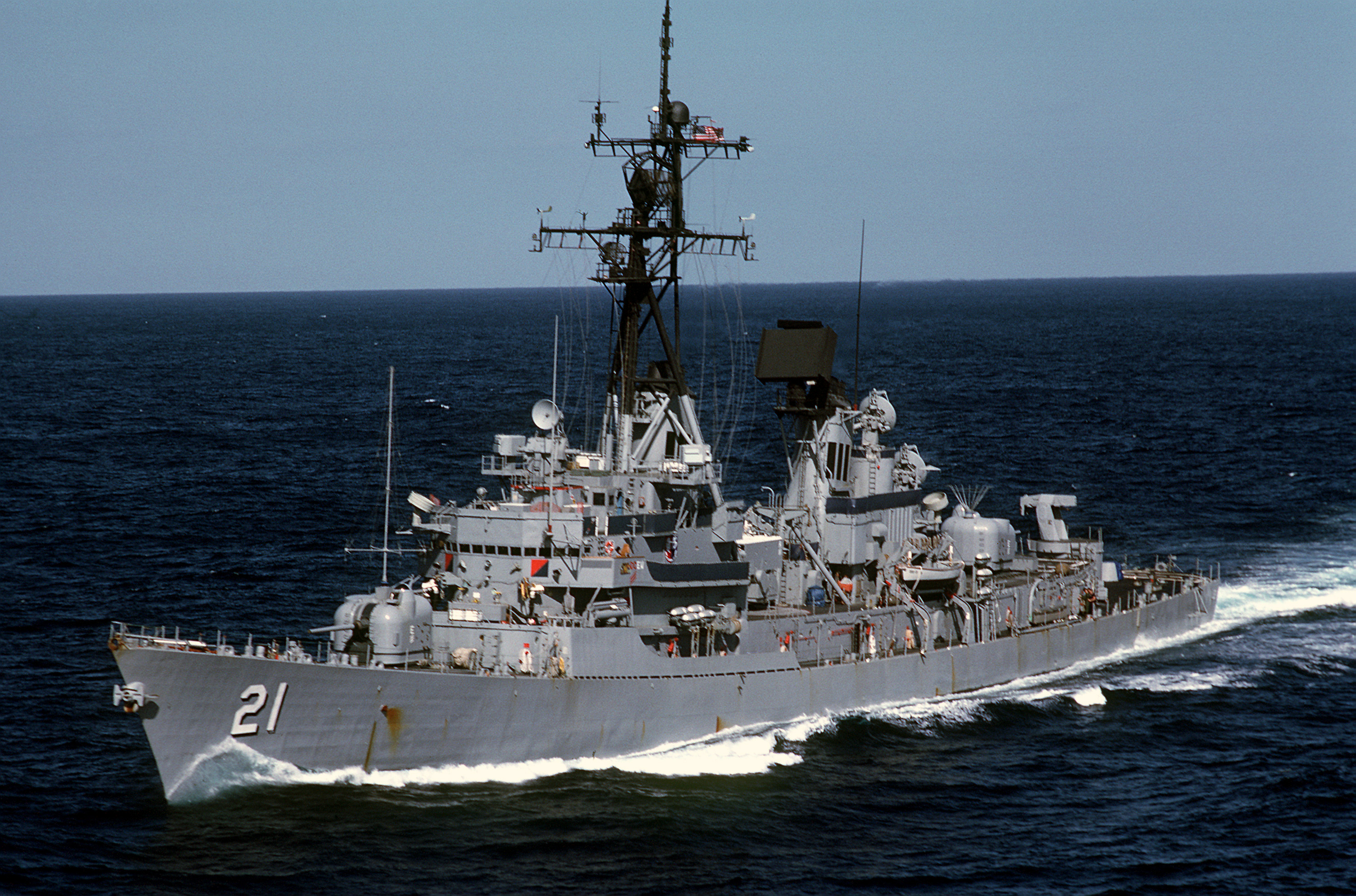
- USS Cochrane underway on 1 March 1984

History

United States
- Name: Cochrane
- Namesake: Edward L. Cochrane
- Ordered: 25 March 1960
- Builder: Puget Sound Bridge and Dredging Company
- Laid down: 31 July 1961
- Launched: 18 July 1962
- Acquired: 6 March 1964
- Commissioned: 21 March 1964
- Decommissioned: 1 October 1990
- Stricken: 20 November 1992
- Identification: Callsign: NFIT; Hull number: DDG-21
- Motto: Virtute et Labore; (By valour and exertion)
- Fate: Scrapped, 17 January 2001

General characteristics
- Class & type: Charles F. Adams-class destroyer
- Displacement: 3,527 tons standard, 4,642 full load
- Length: 440.25 ft (134.19 m)
- Beam: 47 ft (14 m)
- Draft: 22 ft (6.7 m)
- Propulsion: 2 × General Electric steam turbines providing 70,000 shp (52 MW); 2 shafts; 4 × Babcock & Wilcox 1,275 psi (8,790 kPa) boilers
- Speed: 33 knots (61 km/h; 38 mph)
- Range: 4,500 nautical miles (8,300 km) at 20 knots (37 km/h)
- Complement: 354 (24 officers, 330 enlisted)
- Sensors & processing systems: AN/SPS-39 3D air search radar; AN/SPS-10 surface search radar; AN/SPG-51 missile fire control radar; AN/SPG-53 gunfire control radar; AN/SQS-23 Sonar; AN/SPS-40 Air Search Radar
- Armament: 1 × Mk 13 Tartar launcher aft with a capacity of 40 missiles combination of both SM-1MR SAM's plus one training round; 2 × Mk 42 5in/54 (127 mm/54) gun mounts; 1 × Mk 16 (8) cell ASROC launcher amidships with trainable Mark 44 & Mark 46 torpedoes, rocket assisted; 2 × Mk 32 triple torpedo tubes with trainable Mk 44 & Mk 46 torpedoes

USS Cochrane (DDG-21) was a Charles F. Adams-class guided missile destroyer built for the United States Navy in the 1960s.

== Design and description ==
The Charles F. Adams class was based on a stretched Forrest Sherman-class destroyer hull modified to accommodate smaller RIM-24 Tartar surface-to-air missiles and all their associated equipment. The ships had an overall length of 437 feet (133.2 m), a beam of 47 feet (14.3 m) and a deep draft of 15 feet (4.6 m). They displaced 4,526 long tons (4,599 t) at full load. Their crew consisted of 18 officers and 320 enlisted men.

The ships were equipped with two geared steam turbines, each driving one propeller shaft, using steam provided by four water-tube boilers. The turbines were intended to produce 70,000 shaft horsepower (52,000 kW) to reach the designed speed of 33 knots (61 km/h; 38 mph). The Adams class had a range of 4,500 nautical miles (8,300 km; 5,200 mi) at a speed of 20 knots (37 km/h; 23 mph).

The Charles F. Adams-class ships were armed with two 5"/54 caliber Mark 42 gun forward, one each forward and aft of the superstructure. They were fitted with an eight-round ASROC launcher between the funnels. Close-range anti-submarine defense was provided by two triple sets of 12.75-inch (324 mm) Mk 32 torpedo tubes. The primary armament of the ships was the Tartar surface-to-air missile designed to defend the carrier battle group. They were fired via the Mk 13 missile launcher and the ships stowed a total of 40 missiles for the launcher.

== Construction and career ==
Cochrane, named for Vice Admiral Edward L. Cochrane, USN, was laid down by the Puget Sound Bridge and Dredging Company at Seattle, Washington on 31 July 1961, launched on 18 July 1962 and commissioned on 21 March 1964. In April 1975 Cochrane participated in Operation Frequent Wind, the evacuation of Saigon, Vietnam.

On 1 October 1980 Cochrane rescued 104 Vietnamese refugees 620 miles (1,000 km) east of Saigon. Cochrane was decommissioned on 1 October 1990, struck from the Naval Vessel Register on 20 November 1992 and sold as scrap to International Shipbreaking, Incorporated, of Brownsville in Texas on 14 November 2000.

== In popular culture ==
Cochrane appears in the original Hawaii Five-O (1968 TV series) season 8 episode Murder: Eyes Only.

Cochrane also appears in the 1987 Kevin Costner film "No Way Out."
