= SS Express (1940) =

American cargo ship sunk in 1942

History
- Name: SS Express
- Owner: American Export Lines
- Operator: American Export Lines
- Port of registry: (United States) New York
- Builder: Bethlehem Shipbuilding; Quincy, Massachusetts
- Yard number: 1477
- Launched: 9 March 1940
- Completed: 18 April 1940
- Fate: Sunk by I-10, 30 June 1942

General characteristics
- Type: Type C3-E ship
- Tonnage: 6,737 GRT
- Length: 451 ft 9 in (137.69 m)
- Beam: 66 ft 2 in (20.17 m)
- Draft: 28 ft 9 in (8.76 m)
- Decks: three decks
- Propulsion: 2 geared steam turbines
- Speed: 16.5 knots (30.6 km/h)
- Crew: 10 officers, 35 sailors, 10 Naval Armed Guardsmen (83 total)
- Armament: 1 × 5 in (130 mm) gun; 2 × .50 cal (12.7 mm) machine gun; 2 × .30 cal (7.62 mm) machine gun

SS Express was a Type C3-E cargo ship of American Export Lines that was sunk by I-10 in June 1942 in the Indian Ocean. The ship, built in 1940 by Bethlehem Shipbuilding in Quincy, Massachusetts, was one of eight sister ships built for the United States Maritime Commission on behalf of American Export Lines. Out of a total of 55 men aboard the ship at the time of its torpedoing, 13 were killed; most of the other 42 landed on the coast of Mozambique six days after the sinking.

== Career ==
SS Express was a cargo ship laid down (yard no. 1477) by Bethlehem Shipbuilding of Quincy, Massachusetts, for the United States Maritime Commission on behalf of American Export Lines. The ship, one of eight sister ships built for American Export by Bethlehem Shipbuilding, was launched (ship) on 9 March 1940, and delivered to American Export on 18 April.

The ship, registered at 6,737 gross register tons (GRT), was 451 feet 9 inches (137.69 m) in length, 66 feet 2 inches (20.17 m) abeam, and drew 28 feet 9 inches (8.76 m). She had three decks and could accommodate a crew of 10 officers and 35 men. To move her at her reported top speed of 16.5 knots (30.6 km/h), Express was equipped with two steam turbines, both also built by Bethlehem Shipbuilding. At some point near when the United States entered World War II in December 1941, the ship was armed with one 5-inch (130 mm) deck gun and four machine guns and carried a complement of ten Naval Armed Guardsmen to man them.

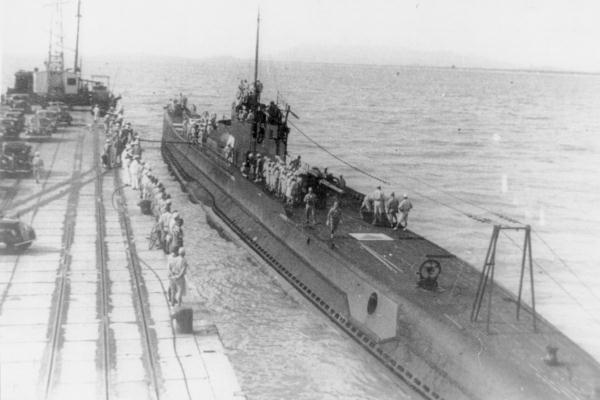
I-10, pictured here in April 1942, sank Express on 30 June 1942.

On 18 June 1942, Express sailed from Bombay, India, for Cape Town, South Africa, with a cargo of manganese ore, jute, leather, and other goods. At 00:30 on 30 June, while navigating almost due south on a zig-zag course near position 23°30′S 37°30′E, a star shell fired by I-10 illuminated the sky at almost the same time that two torpedoes from the same submarine hit their mark on Express. The first torpedo struck the cargo ship at waterline on the starboard side near the no. 7 hatch. The second torpedo, which hit five seconds after the first, hit at the no. 5 hatch. The explosions blew off the hatch covers, knocked out the guns, and destroyed the radio, preventing a distress call. The ship began sinking by the stern almost immediately, and the officers, crew, and Naval Armed Guard detachment took to the lifeboats. Because Express was still underway even while sinking, two of the three boats launched were swamped; the thirteen men aboard the no. 1 boat, one of the pair swamped, all drowned. The no. 2 boat, with 41 men aboard, made landfall on the coast of Mozambique six days after the sinking. Another crewman—who had originally been on a life raft, but moved to a water-filled lifeboat—was rescued by a Dutch tanker and landed at Cape Town.
