= USS Riddle =

Cannon-class destroyer escort

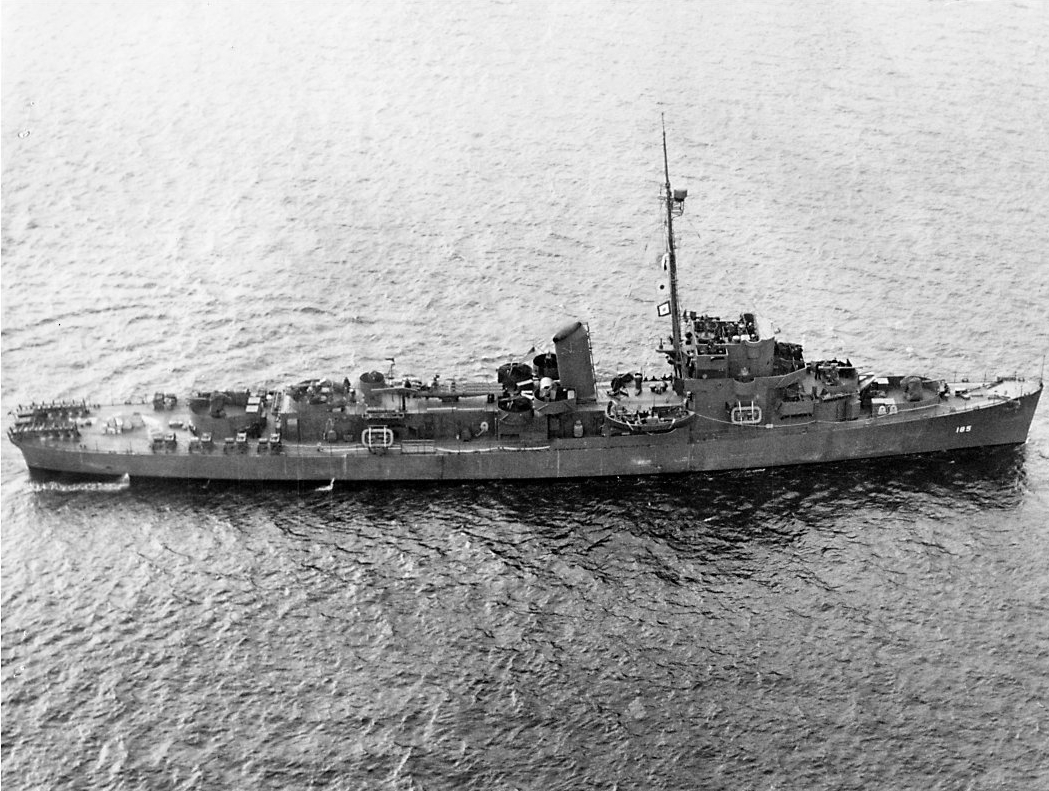

History

United States
- Name: USS Riddle
- Namesake: Joseph Riddle Jr.
- Builder: Federal Shipbuilding and Drydock Company, Newark, New Jersey
- Laid down: 29 July 1943
- Launched: 17 October 1943
- Commissioned: 17 November 1943
- Decommissioned: June 1946
- Stricken: 26 September 1950
- Honors and awards: 12 battle stars (World War II)
- Fate: Transferred to France, 12 August 1950

History

France
- Name: Kabyle (F718)
- Namesake: Kabyle people
- Acquired: 12 August 1950
- Stricken: 1959
- Fate: Broken up, 1959

General characteristics
- Class & type: Cannon-class destroyer escort
- Displacement: 1,240 long tons (1,260 t) standard; 1,620 long tons (1,646 t) full
- Length: 306 ft (93 m) o/a; 300 ft (91 m) w/l
- Beam: 36 ft 10 in (11.23 m)
- Draft: 11 ft 8 in (3.56 m)
- Propulsion: 4 × GM Mod. 16-278A diesel engines with electric drive, 6,000 shp (4,474 kW), 2 screws
- Speed: 21 knots (39 km/h; 24 mph)
- Range: 10,800 nmi (20,000 km) at 12 kn (22 km/h; 14 mph)
- Complement: 15 officers and 201 enlisted
- Armament: 3 × single Mk.22 3"/50 caliber guns; 1 × twin 40 mm Mk.1 AA gun; 8 × 20 mm Mk.4 AA guns; 3 × 21-inch (533 mm) torpedo tubes; 1 × Hedgehog Mk.10 anti-submarine mortar (144 rounds); 8 × Mk.6 depth charge projectors; 2 × Mk.9 depth charge tracks

USS Riddle (DE-185) was a Cannon-class destroyer escort in service with the United States Navy from 1943 to 1946. In 1950, she was transferred to France where she served as Kabyle (F718) until being decommissioned and scrapped in 1959.

== Namesake ==
Joseph Riddle Jr. was born on 6 January 1918 in St. Clairsville, Ohio. He enlisted in the U.S. Naval Reserve on 28 May 1941, was appointed aviation cadet on 2 September 1941; appointed naval aviator on 7 March 1942; and appointed ensign on 14 March 1942. He was in an active duty status other than training from 17 April 1942, and was assigned to the U.S. Naval Air Station, Seattle, Washington, for active duty involving flying in connection with the fitting out of Escort Scouting Squadron 12, and for active duty involving flying in that squadron when placed in commission.

He was killed by enemy fighter aircraft after successfully bombing a Japanese destroyer north of New Georgia Island on 4 February 1943. He was posthumously awarded the Distinguished Flying Cross.

== History ==
The ship was laid down by the Federal Shipbuilding & Dry Dock Co., Newark, New Jersey, on 29 July 1943; launched on 17 October 1943; sponsored by Mrs. Anna B. Riddle; and commissioned on 17 November 1943.

=== U.S. Navy (1943–1950) ===
Following shakedown off Bermuda, Riddle sailed for Pearl Harbor via the Panama Canal, arriving on 1 February 1944. On 10 February she got underway as an escort vessel with Task Unit 16.11.6, bound for the Marshall Islands. Upon arrival she conducted anti-submarine patrols in the Roi Namur-Kwajalein-Majuro Atoll area until steaming for Pearl Harbor on 15 March.

After serving as an escort to Majuro Atoll and Manus Island and back, Riddle was active in the Marshall and Marianas Islands in June 1944. On 4 July, while screening fueling operations with task group TG 50.17, with David W. Taylor (DD-551), she successfully attacked the submerged I-10.

Riddle continued screening operations in the Marshall-Marianas area until 1 September when she anchored at Manus Island. On 4 October she got underway as part of an escort group to screen the sortie of task unit TU 38.8.16, a carrier and fueling group, from Seeadler Harbor for the Philippine Islands invasion. Riddle returned to Manus after the task unit was on its way, and operated in the Admiralty and western Caroline area until early January 1945. On 14 January 1945 she arrived at Leyte Gulf, Philippine Islands, after which she returned to the Marianas and western Carolines on routine screening and patrol duties.

Riddle operated in the Iwo Jima area in February 1945, acting as anti-aircraft and anti-submarine patrol as well as escorting various fleet units in their operations in that bloody battle area. On 5 March, she anchored at Saipan and the following day sailed for Leyte Gulf in company with Hyman (DD-732). After remaining in San Pedro Bay, Leyte Gulf, until 18 March, Riddle got underway as part of the escort group for task unit TU 51.7.1, en route to Kerama Retto, Okinawa.

Upon arrival at Kerama Retto on 26 March 1945, Riddle operated with various screening units, patrol sections, and retirement groups in those waters. 12 April found the vessel off Okinawa on a patrolling station, with task force TF 51, under enemy attack. Two Japanese kamikazes attacked Riddle. The first was shot down, just clearing the ship, and the second crashed into the ship killing one man and causing considerable damage. After transfer of wounded and repair to her battle damage at Kerama Retto, Riddle got underway on 16 April as an escort to Saipan.

Riddle arrived at Okinawa once more on 1 May 1945, and assumed patrol and escort duties there until 15 June when she got underway for Leyte Gulf. She arrived on 18 June and anchored there in San Pedro Bay, until 1 July. From 2 to 4 July, she participated in firing exercises with Salt Lake City (CA-25) and on the 5th got underway as escort for Shamrock Bay (CVE-84) en route to Guam and Hawaii, arriving Pearl Harbor on 19 July.

Riddle proceeded on to San Pedro, Los Angeles, for overhaul which lasted through the end of hostilities. On 13 November, Riddle got underway for the Panama Canal and arrived Norfolk, Virginia, on the 29th. On 31 December 1945 she reported to Commander, Florida Group, U.S. 16th Fleet, for inactivation, and decommissioned on 8 June 1946.

=== French Navy (1950–1959) ===
Riddle was transferred to France on 12 August 1950 under the Military Assistance Program and was struck from the Navy List on 26 September 1950. The destroyer escort served in the French Navy as Kabyle (F718) until broken up in 1959.

== Awards ==
Riddle earned 12 battle stars for World War II service.

== See also ==
- List of Escorteurs of the French Navy
