= USS David W. Taylor =

Fletcher-class destroyer

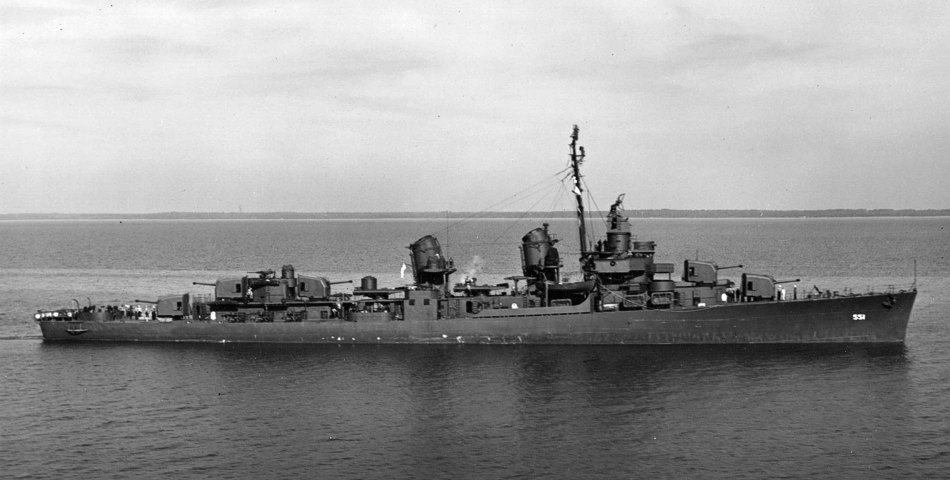
- USS David W. Taylor (DD-551) in 1943

History

United States
- Name: David W. Taylor
- Namesake: David W. Taylor
- Builder: Gulf Shipbuilding Corporation, Chickasaw, Alabama
- Laid down: 12 June 1941
- Launched: 4 July 1942
- Commissioned: 18 September 1943
- Decommissioned: 17 August 1946
- Fate: Leased to Spain, 15 May 1957
- Stricken: 1 October 1972

Spain
- Name: Almirante Ferrándiz
- Acquired: 15 May 1957
- Stricken: 17 November 1987
- Identification: D22
- Fate: Scrapped

General characteristics
- Class & type: Fletcher-class destroyer; Lepanto-class destroyer
- Displacement: 2,050 tons
- Length: 376 ft 6 in (114.76 m)
- Beam: 39 ft 8 in (12.09 m)
- Draft: 17 ft 9 in (5.41 m)
- Propulsion: 60,000 shp (45,000 kW); 2 propellers
- Speed: 35 knots (65 km/h; 40 mph)
- Range: 6,500 nautical miles (12,000 km) at 15 knots (28 km/h)
- Complement: 273
- Armament: 5 × single Mk 12 5 in (127 mm)/38 guns; 5 × twin 40 mm (1.6 in) Bofors AA guns; 7 × single 20 mm (0.8 in) Oerlikon AA guns; 2 × quintuple 21 in (533 mm) torpedo tubes; 6 × single depth charge throwers; 2 × depth charge racks

USS David W. Taylor (DD-551) was a Fletcher-class destroyer of the United States Navy, named for Rear Admiral David W. Taylor (1864–1940).

She was launched 4 July 1942 by Gulf Shipbuilding Corporation, Chickasaw, Ala., sponsored by Mrs. Imogene Taylor Powell, daughter of namesake Rear Admiral David Taylor; and commissioned 18 September 1943.

== History ==
David W. Taylor was built by the Gulf Shipbuilding Corporation, Chickasaw, Alabama, laid down on 12 June 1941, launched on 4 July 1942, and commissioned on 18 September 1943.

She escorted a convoy of merchantmen from Charleston, South Carolina to Pearl Harbor arriving on 20 January 1944. Three days later she got underway to screen a support convoy to the Gilbert and Marshall Islands, returning to Pearl Harbor on 29 February. After escorting the aircraft carrier Intrepid to San Francisco, she sailed from Pearl Harbor 1 April to patrol in the Marshall Islands until 12 May. Returning to Pearl Harbor 18 May, she had training duties there until 7 June.

From 15 June to 4 August 1944 David W. Taylor sailed in the screen of escort carriers and fleet oilers supporting the Marianas operation. On 4 July she and the destroyer escort Riddle attacked and sank the Japanese submarine I-10 at 15°26′N 147°48′E. The destroyer joined the 3d Fleet 19 August, and sailed out of Manus screening the logistics group supporting the fast carrier task forces in their raids preparing for and accompanying the capture and occupation of the southern Palaus. With her base of operations at Ulithi from 29 October, David W. Taylor continued to screen the logistics group until 22 November when she joined the carriers for air attacks on Luzon in support of the invading troops on Leyte.

On 29 December 1944 she sailed from Ulithi for the air raids on the Bonins, bombarding Chichi Jima 5 January 1945. At 07:45 that day an underwater explosion, probably a mine, heavily damaged the ship and killed four men, but damage control brought her safely to Saipan 7 January under her own power. The ship continued to Hunter's Point Naval Shipyard, California, for an overhaul and repairs from 13 February to 7 May.

Sailing from San Diego 15 May 1945 David W. Taylor bombarded Emidj Island on 18 June on her way to Okinawa, arriving 30 June. The destroyer operated with a task group off Okinawa. After Japan surrendered, the ship arrived at Takasu, Kyūshū, 4 September, as escort for a convoy carrying occupation troops. She covered the landings at Wakanoura Wan and Nagoya until sailing 31 October for San Diego, arriving 17 November. David W. Taylor was placed out of commission in reserve there 17 August 1946.

== Almirante Ferrándiz (D22) ==
On 15 May 1957, the destroyer was leased to Spain where she served in the Armada Española as Almirante Ferrándiz (D22). Spain purchased the destroyer on 1 October 1972. The ship remained in service until 17 November 1987, when she was stricken and scrapped.

== Honors ==
David W. Taylor received eight battle stars for World War II service.
