= William B. Morgan =

American naval architect

- Born: Mount Pleasant, Iowa, U.S.

Academic background
- Education: University of Iowa (MS); University of California, Berkeley (PhD)

Academic work
- Discipline: Engineering
- Sub-discipline: Marine engineering Naval architecture
- Institutions: Carderock Division of the Naval Surface Warfare Center

William B. Morgan is an American naval architect and renowned expert in propeller design.

== Early life and education ==
Morgan was born in Mount Pleasant, Iowa. He earned a Master of Science degree in mechanics and hydraulics 1951 from the University of Iowa and a PhD in naval architecture from the University of California, Berkeley, in 1961.

== Career ==
Morgan devoted his professional career to the Carderock Division (David Taylor Model Basin), Naval Surface Warfare Center, Bethesda, Maryland.

Morgan started working with UNIVAC I and UNIVAC II computers in 1954. He introduced computers into naval engineering and thereby revolutionized propeller design. He published numerous studies of sub-cavitating, super-cavitating, and contra-rotating propellers; annular airfoil and ducted propeller theory; propeller blade strength; hydrodynamic properties of blade sections; and propeller cavitation, ventilation and noise. Perhaps most significantly, he led development of the highly skewed propeller with its superior vibration and acoustic properties.

Morgan ultimately was named head of the hydromechanics directorate, David Taylor Model Basin, responsible for all hydromechanic research concerning United States Navy ships and submarines, and managing three hundred employees, a $70 million budget and Navy testing facilities estimated at almost $2 billion nationwide. He directed the acquisition of major facilities including the Maneuvering and Seakeeping Basin, Rotating Arm, 36-inch Variable Pressure Water Tunnel, and the Large Cavitation Channel (now named in his honor).

Morgan was given numerous awards from national and international technical societies, academia, and the Navy. He is the only U.S. citizen to receive the William Froude Medal from the Royal Institution of Naval Architects. In 1992, he was elected a member of the National Academy of Engineering for technical leadership improving performance, quieting, and design of advanced marine propulsion systems, and development of large modern propulsion testing facilities. In 1997 was awarded the Gibbs Brothers Medal by the National Academy of Sciences.
