= Japanese submarine I-10 =

Imperial Japanese Navy Type A1 submarine

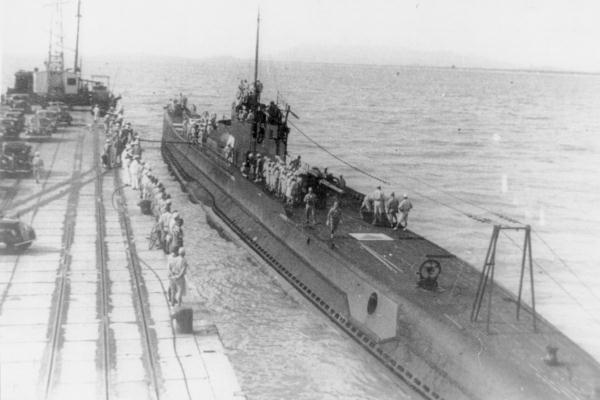
- I-10 at Penang in 1942.

History

Empire of Japan
- Name: I-10
- Builder: Kawasaki, Kobe
- Laid down: 7 June 1938
- Launched: 20 or 29 September 1939 (see text)
- Commissioned: 31 October 1941
- Fate: Sunk 4 July 1944
- Stricken: 10 October 1944

Service record
- Commanders: Kayahara Yasuchika; 31 October 1941 – 15 September 1942; Yamada Takashi; 15 September 1942 – 15 April 1943; Tonozuka Kinzo; 15 April 1943 – 18 January 1944; Nakajima Seiji; 18 January 1944 – 4 July 1944

General characteristics
- Class & type: Type A1 submarine
- Displacement: 2,966 tonnes (2,919 long tons) surfaced; 4,195 tonnes (4,129 long tons) submerged
- Length: 113.7 m (373 ft 0 in) overall
- Beam: 9.5 m (31 ft 2 in)
- Draft: 5.3 m (17 ft 5 in)
- Installed power: 12,400 bhp (9,200 kW) (diesel); 2,400 hp (1,800 kW) (electric motor)
- Propulsion: Diesel-electric; 1 × diesel engine; 1 × electric motor
- Speed: 23.5 knots (43.5 km/h; 27.0 mph) surfaced; 8 knots (15 km/h; 9.2 mph) submerged
- Range: 16,000 nmi (30,000 km; 18,000 mi) at 16 knots (30 km/h; 18 mph) surfaced; 60 nmi (110 km; 69 mi) at 3 knots (5.6 km/h; 3.5 mph) submerged
- Test depth: 100 m (330 ft)
- Crew: 100
- Armament: 6 × bow 533 mm (21 in) torpedo tubes; 1 × 14 cm (5.5 in) deck gun; 2 × twin 25 mm (1 in) Type 96 anti-aircraft guns
- Aircraft carried: 1 × Yokosuka E14Y seaplane
- Aviation facilities: 1 × catapult

I-10 was an Imperial Japanese Navy Type A1 submarine that served during World War II. Designed as a submarine aircraft carrier, she was commissioned in 1941 and supported the attack on Pearl Harbor, operated in the Indian Ocean — including support for the 1942 midget submarine attack on Diego Suarez — and in the New Caledonia and New Zealand areas, and took part in the Guadalcanal campaign and Marianas campaign before she was sunk in 1944 during her seventh war patrol.

== Design and description ==
Type A1 submarines were versions of the preceding Type J3 with superior range and an improved aircraft installation, and they were fitted as squadron flagships. They displaced 2,966 tonnes (2,919 long tons) on the surface and 4,195 tonnes (4,129 long tons) submerged. The submarines were 113.7 meters (373 ft 0 in) long, a beam of 9.5 meters (31 ft 2 in) and a draft of 5.3 meters (17 ft 5 in). They had a diving depth of 100 meters (328 ft).

For surface running, Type A1 submarines were powered by two 6,200-brake-horsepower (4,623 kW) diesel engines, each driving one propeller shaft. When submerged each propeller was driven by a 1,200-horsepower (895 kW) electric motor. They could reach 19 knots (35 km/h; 22 mph) on the surface and 8.25 knots (15.28 km/h; 9.49 mph) underwater. On the surface, the Type A1s had a range of 16,000 nautical miles (29,600 km; 18,400 mi) at 16 knots (30 km/h; 18 mph); submerged, they had a range of 90 nmi (170 km; 100 mi) at 3 knots (5.6 km/h; 3.5 mph).

Type A1 submarines were armed with four internal bow 53.3 cm (21.0 in) torpedo tubes and carried a total of 18 torpedoes. They were also armed with a single 140 mm (5.5 in)/40 deck gun and two twin 25 mm (1 in) Type 96 anti-aircraft guns.

Unlike on the Type J3 submarines, the aircraft hangar was integrated into the conning tower and faced forward, and the aircraft catapult was forward of the hangar, while the deck gun was aft of the conning tower. Reversing the locations of the deck gun and catapult allowed aircraft launching from a Type A1 submarine to use the forward motion of the submarine to supplement the speed imparted by the catapult.

== Construction and commissioning ==
Built by Kawasaki at Kobe, Japan, I-10 was laid down as Submarine No. 10 on 7 June 1938. Later renamed I-10, she was launched on 20 or 29 September 1939, according to different sources, and was completed and commissioned on 31 October 1941.

== Service history ==
=== Pre-World War II ===
On the day of her commissioning, I-10 was attached to the Sasebo Naval District and assigned to Submarine Squadron 2 in the 6th Fleet. By 10 November 1941, she was serving as the squadron's flagship. That day, the 6th Fleet commander, Vice Admiral Mitsumi Shimizu, held a meeting with the commanding officers of the submarines of Submarine Squadron 3 aboard his flagship, the light cruiser Katori, and his chief of staff briefed them on plans for Operation Z, the upcoming surprise attack on Pearl Harbor in Hawaii. The attack would begin the Pacific campaign and bring Japan and the United States into World War II. I-10 and the submarine I-26 were assigned to the 6th Fleet Reconnaissance Unit.

As Japanese military forces began to deploy for the opening Japanese offensive of the war, I-10, with an embarked Watanabe E9W1 (Allied reporting name "Slim") floatplane, departed Yokosuka, Japan, on 16 November 1941, with orders to conduct a reconnaissance of areas in the vicinity of Fiji and the Samoan Islands, including Tutuila in American Samoa. She arrived at Kwajalein Atoll in the Marshall Islands on 23 November 1941 to refuel, then proceeded to Fijian waters. Off Viti Levu in the Fiji Islands on 30 November 1941, she launched her floatplane to reconnoiter Suva Bay off Suva. The floatplane′s crew reported sighting no enemy ships at Suva Bay, but it never returned to I-10, and after a fruitless three-day search for it and its crew under radio silence, I-10 gave up the search and reported the loss of her plane and its crew to 6th Fleet headquarters.

While I-10 was at sea, she received the message "Climb Mount Niitaka 1208" (Japanese: Niitakayama nobore 1208) from the Combined Fleet on 2 December 1941, indicating that war with the Allies would commence on 8 December 1941 Japan time, which was on 7 December 1941 on the other side of the International Date Line in Hawaii. On 3 December 1941, she conducted a submerged reconnaissance of the harbor at Pago Pago on Tutuila in American Samoa, sighting what she identified as a United States Navy "Astoria-class" heavy cruiser.

=== World War II ===
==== First war patrol ====
Heading toward Hawaii after leaving the waters around American Samoa, I-10 arrived in a patrol area 1,300 nautical miles (2,400 km; 1,500 mi) south of Oahu on 7 December 1941, the day the Japanese attacked Pearl Harbor. On 9 December, she received a report that the submarine I-18 had sighted the U.S. Navy aircraft carrier USS Lexington, along with orders to leave her patrol area and join the search for Lexington. While 700 nautical miles (1,300 km; 810 mi) southeast of Hawaii after dark that evening, she fired one torpedo at the Panamanian 4,430-gross register ton motor vessel Donerail, which was on a voyage from Suva to Vancouver, British Columbia, Canada, with a cargo of sugar and pineapples. After the torpedo missed, she surfaced and attacked Donerail with gunfire, firing twenty 140-millimeter (5.5 in) rounds. As Donerail′s crew abandoned ship, one shell struck her starboard lifeboat while it still hung in its davits, completely destroying it and killing everyone in it. Donerail sank two hours later at 08°N 152°W. Meanwhile, I-10′s crew opened machine gun fire on her survivors. Twenty-seven of Donerail′s passengers and crew died in the sinking and subsequent massacre, leaving only 16 alive. Of the 42 people aboard Donerail, only eight ultimately survived, reaching Tarawa in the Gilbert Islands 38 days later.

On 12 December 1941, I-10 was reassigned to the Advance Force, and that day she received orders to proceed to the United States West Coast and patrol in an area off San Diego, California. On 13 December 1941, Japanese Imperial General Headquarters ordered the submarines of the 6th Fleet to bombard the U.S. West Coast. On 14 December 1941, the 6th Fleet′s commander, Vice Admiral Mitsumi Shimizu, in turn ordered I-10 and the submarines I-9, I-15, I-17, I-19, I-21, I-23, I-25, and I-26 each to fire 30 rounds at targets on the U.S. West Coast on the evening of 25 December 1941, with the commander of Submarine Squadron 1, Rear Admiral Tsutomu Sato. aboard I-9 in overall command of the bombardment. On 22 December 1941 the commander-in-chief of the Combined Fleet, Admiral Isoroku Yamamoto, postponed the bombardment until 27 December. On 27 December 1941, Sato cancelled the bombardment because most of the submarines tasked with carrying it out were low on fuel. I-10′s time off the U.S. West Coast otherwise passed quietly. On 9 January 1942 she was reassigned directly to 6th Fleet headquarters, and on 11 January 1942 she arrived at Kwajalein.

==== January–April 1942 ====
After an overnight stay at Kwajalein, I-10 departed on 12 January 1942 bound for Yokosuka, which she reached on 21 January 1942. While in Japan, she was reassigned to Submarine Squadron 8 on 10 March 1942. On 12 March, she got underway from Yokosuka to search for and attack the aircraft carriers of U.S. Navy Task Force 17, which had conducted the Lae-Salamaua Raid against Japanese forces landing on the northeast coast of New Guinea on 10 March, but she had no success, and she returned to Japan, arriving at Kure on 20 March 1942.

During I-10′s stay in Japan, the German naval staff in Berlin formally requested on 27 March 1942 that Japan begin attacks on Allied convoys in the Indian Ocean. On 8 April 1942, the Japanese formally agreed to meet this request by dispatching submarines to operate off the coast of East Africa, and that day they withdrew Submarine Division 1 of Submarine Squadron 8 from its base at Kwajalein to Japan. By 16 April 1942 they had created the "A" detachment within Submarine Squadron 8, consisting of I-10 and the submarines I-16, I-18, I-20, and I-30, as well as midget submarines and the auxiliary cruisers Aikoku Maru and Hōkoku Maru, which were to operate as supply ships for the submarines. That morning, the commander of the 6th Fleet, Vice Admiral Teruhisa Komatsu, the commander of Submarine Squadron 8, their staffs, and the midget submarine crews paid a courtesy call on Admiral Yamamoto aboard his flagship, the battleship Yamato, at Hashirajima anchorage. After the visit with Yamamoto, the detachment got underway at 11:00, bound for Penang in Japanese-occupied British Malaya.

During the detachment′s voyage, 16 United States Army Air Forces B-25 Mitchell bombers launched by the aircraft carrier USS Hornet struck targets on Honshu in the Doolittle Raid on 18 April 1942. The detachment received orders from the 6th Fleet that day to divert from its voyage and head northeast, passing north of the Bonin Islands, to intercept the U.S. Navy task force that had launched the strike. The detachment failed to find the U.S. ships and soon resumed its voyage.

I-30 and Aikoku Maru called at Penang from 20 April to 22 April 1942 before heading into the Indian Ocean to conduct an advance reconnaissance of the "A" Detachment′s planned operating area. I-10 made an overnight stop at Singapore from 23 to 24 April, then proceeded to Penang. The Imperial Japanese Army transport Urajio Maru mistakenly opened gunfire on her during her voyage, but she avoided damage and arrived at Penang safely on 25 April 1942. On 27 April, the rest of the "A" Detachment arrived at Penang, where the seaplane carrier Nisshin — which had undergone modifications allowing her to carry Type A midget submarines — rendezvoused with it. I-16, I-18, and I-20 each embarked a midget submarine at Penang on 30 April 1942.

==== Indian Ocean operation ====
I-10 and the other "A" detachment units got underway from Penang on 30 April 1942, headed westward into the Indian Ocean with I-10 serving as the detachment′s flagship. The submarines refueled at sea from Aikoku Maru and Hōkoku Maru on 5, 10, and 15 May 1942.

I-10′s Yokosuka E14Y1 (Allied reporting name "Glen") floatplane began reconnaissance flights over ports in South Africa by reconnoitering Durban on 20 May 1942, where its crew found no targets of importance. Although challenged from the ground during the flight, the aircraft escaped after its radioman bought time by transmitting a false recognition signal in response. The plane made flights over East London, Port Elizabeth, and Simon's Town over the next week, and by 24 May the "A" detachment submarines were encountering heavy Allied shipping traffic as they approached East Africa. On the night of 29 May, I-10′s floatplane flew over Diego-Suarez, Madagascar, sighting the British battleship HMS Ramillies among the ships anchored there. The "A" detachment commander selected Diego-Suarez as the target for a midget submarine attack, scheduled for 30 May 1942.

On 30 May 1942, I-18′s midget submarine could not launch because of engine failure, but I-16 and I-20 both launched their midget submarines to attack the Allied warships at Diego Suarez. I-20′s midget submarine, M-20b, managed to enter the harbor and was attacked with depth charges, but fired two torpedoes. One torpedo seriously damaged Ramillies, while the second sank the 6,993-ton oil tanker British Loyalty. Ramillies required repairs in South Africa and England. Neither midget submarine returned, and on 31 May 1942, I-10′s floatplane made a flight over Diego Suarez in the hope of locating any of the midget submarine crewmen who might have reached shore, without success. I-16′s midget submarine disappeared at sea and the body of one of its crewman was found washed ashore on Madagascar on 31 May. The crew of M-20b beached their craft at Nosy Antalikely and moved inland towards a pre-arranged pick-up point near Cape Amber, but were both killed in a firefight with British Royal Marines on 2 June 1942; one Marine was killed in the action as well.

After the midget submarine attack, the "A" detachment began anti-shipping operations in the Indian Ocean. I-10 had her first success at 02:31 on 5 June 1942 when she sank the 2,639-gross register ton Panamanian steamer SS Atlantic Gulf in the Mozambique Channel 350 nautical miles (650 km; 400 mi) east of Beira, Portuguese East Africa, at 21°03′S 037°36′E. Later that day, she sank the American 4,999-gross register ton armed cargo ship SS Melvin H. Baker at 21°44′S 036°38′W; the British steamer SS Twickenham rescued Melvin H. Baker′s crew. Again in the Mozambique Channel 350 nautical miles (650 km; 400 mi) east of Beira, she torpedoed the 5,224-gross register ton British steamer SS King Lud — which was on a voyage from New York City to Bombay in British India with a stop at Cape Town, South Africa, carrying military personnel and government stores — at 09:53 on 8 June 1942; King Lud sank at 20°S 40°E, with no survivors.

Aikoku Maru and Hōkoku Maru refueled and replenished I-10 on 17 June 1942. Returning to action, she torpedoed the 4,957-gross register ton British motor vessel MV Queen Victoria — which was on a voyage from the River Tyne in England to Aden with a cargo of military stores — in the Mozambique Channel south of Beira on 28 June 1942; Queen Victoria sank at 21°15′S 040°30′E, with no survivors. Still in the Mozambique Channel south of Beira on 30 June, she torpedoed the American 6,737-gross register ton armed steamer SS Express, which was on a voyage from Bombay to Cape Town with a cargo of manganese ore, jute, and leather. Two torpedoes hit Express on her starboard side and she sank by the stern at 23°30′S 037°30′E. Eleven members of Express′s crew and two personnel of her United States Navy Armed Guard drowned after abandoning ship when their boat was swamped in heavy seas.

I-10′s success against Allied shipping in the Indian Ocean continued in July. At 16:15 on 6 July 1942, she torpedoed and sank the Greek 4,504-gross register ton merchant ship Nymphe at 15°48′S 040°42′E. At 07:48 on 8 July, she torpedoed the British 5,498-gross register ton armed steamer SS Hartismere — which was making a voyage from Philadelphia, Pennsylvania, to Alexandria, Egypt, via Lourenço Marques, Portuguese East Africa, carrying 8,000 tons of general cargo — in the Mozambique Channel. One torpedo hit Hartismere in the vicinity of her No. 1 hold, triggering a violent explosion which started a fire and prompted her crew to abandon ship. I-10 surfaced and sank Hartismere with gunfire at 18°00′S 041°22′E, and Hartismere′s crew and gunners made it to shore in her lifeboats at Caldera Point on the coast of Portuguese East Africa.

I-10′s final victim of the Indian Ocean operation was the 4,427-ton Dutch armed merchant ship Alchiba, which was on a voyage from Durban, South Africa, to London via Aden with a cargo of 4,000 tons of ammunition. I-10 torpedoed Alchiba at 17:55 on 8 July, hitting her in her engine room on the port side. The torpedo hit killed five firemen, destroyed two lifeboats, and knocked out all of Alchiba′s lights. Her surviving crew abandoned ship, after which I-10 surfaced and fired nine 140-millimeter (5.5 in) rounds at Alchiba. Alchiba broke in two and sank at 18°30′S 041°40′E. Some of her survivors mistakenly claimed that two submarines had attacked her. I-10 returned to Penang on 30 July 1942.

==== August–October 1942 ====
I-10 departed Penang on 1 August 1942 bound for Yokosuka, which she reached on 12 August. She remained in Japan until 21 October 1942, when she departed Yokosuka heading for Truk Atoll. She arrived at Truk on 27 October 1942.

==== Guadalcanal campaign ====
The Guadalcanal campaign had begun with United States Marine Corps landings on Guadalcanal in the southeastern Solomon Islands on 7 August 1942. While I-10 was at Truk, she was reassigned to the "C" Patrol Unit on 31 October 1942. On 24 November 1942 she got underway from Truk to patrol off San Cristobal in support of a midget submarine attack against Allied shipping in Lungga Roads off the north coast of Guadalcanal. She returned to Truk on 18 December 1942.

==== Third war patrol ====
With a Yokosuka E14Y1 (Allied reporting name "Glen") floatplane aboard, I-10 departed Truk on 5 January 1943, ordered to attack Allied shipping south of the Solomon Islands and conduct a reconnaissance of Nouméa on Grande Terre in New Caledonia, of New Zealand waters, and of the Torres Strait. She passed east of the Solomons on 10 January. She sighted what she identified as an aircraft carrier escorted by two destroyers on 16 January 80 nautical miles (150 km; 92 mi) south-southeast of Nouméa and attempted a pursuit and attack, but she failed to achieve a good attack position and all of her torpedoes missed. At 00:15 on 20 January 1943 she sighted what she identified as an unescorted transport south of Nouméa, and at 00:20 on 23 January she sighted two destroyers east of Nouméa. After dark on 24 January, she launched her floatplane for a reconnaissance flight over the Nouméa area — at a time when United States Secretary of the Navy Frank Knox and the Commander-in-Chief of the United States Pacific Fleet, Chester W. Nimitz, were in Nouméa for a Commander, South Pacific Area conference — and at 01:00 on 25 January its crew reported seeing several battleships, cruisers, destroyers, and transports in the harbor.

On 30 January 1943, I-10 was in the Coral Sea 115 nautical miles (213 km; 132 mi) south of the Amédée Lighthouse on Amédée Island in New Caledonia when she hit the American 7,176-gross register ton Liberty ship SS Samuel Gompers with a single torpedo in the stern at 04:49. Samuel Gompers, which was on a voyage from Nouméa to Newcastle, New South Wales, Australia, suffered an explosion and sank at 04:54 at 24°28′S 166°20′E. At about 14:00 on 9 February 1943, I-10 fired torpedoes at what she identified as an unescorted transport, but the torpedoes passed under the ship without exploding. At 05:42 on 10 February, she attacked another transport in the area, but failed to gain a good firing position and all her torpedoes missed.

I-10 arrived off Auckland, New Zealand, on 14 February 1943 and off Wellington, New Zealand, on 16 February. On 22 February, Allied signals intelligence intercepted several of I-10′s transmissions and, based on them, estimated that I-10 was about to pass through the Cook Strait, not realizing that she had already transited the strait over a week earlier. A Royal New Zealand Air Force search for I-10 in the Cook Strait area found nothing.

I-10 attacked a transport at 10:50 on 27 February 1943, but her torpedoes missed. On 1 March 1943, however, she succeeded in torpedoing the American 7,141-gross register ton tanker SS Gulfwave in the New Hebrides at 20°30′S 174°45′E. Gulfwave′s crew and United States Navy Armed Guard detachment suffered no casualties, and the tanker made port at Suva in the Fiji Islands under her own power. After reconnoitering the Torres Strait on 5 March, I-10 headed back to Truk, which she reached on 10 March 1943.

==== March–June 1943 ====
I-10 got underway from Truk on 15 March 1943 and set course for Sasebo, Japan, where she arrived on 21 March to undergo repairs. With them complete, she departed Sasebo on 17 May 1943 and made for the Seto Inland Sea for workups and where from 17 to 19 May she engaged in refueling exercises in the Iyo-nada with the submarine I-8, which had been selected to carry out a Yanagi mission, a round-trip voyage between Japan and German-occupied France I-10 arrived at Kure on 26 May 1943.

On 1 June 1943, I-10 departed Kure in company with I-8 and the submarine tender Hie Maru. The three vessels proceeded to Saeki Gulf, then departed Saeki Gulf on 2 June and made for Penang, where I-10 arrived on 12 June 1943 and was made flagship of Submarine Squadron 8.

==== Fourth war patrol ====
On 27 June 1943, I-10 departed Penang with the commander of Submarine Squadron 8, Rear Admiral Noboru Ishizaki, aboard to begin her fourth war patrol in company with I-8, which was beginning the next leg of her Yanagi-mission voyage to France. I-10 refueled I-8 at 04°53′S 087°20′E on 1 July and again at 22°25′S 076°15′E on 6 July 1943 before the two submarines separated, I-8 proceeding on her voyage to France and I-10 beginning anti-shipping operations in the Indian Ocean. In the Gulf of Aden, I-10 hit the 7,634-gross register ton Norwegian tanker Alcides with two torpedoes on 22 July 1943. Alcides, which was on a voyage from Abadan, Iran, to Fremantle, Australia, sank at 03°S 068°E. I-10 took Alcides′s master, radio officer, and second mate aboard, and they remained prisoners of war in Japan until freed by American forces on 29 August 1945. I-10 returned to Penang on 4 August 1943.

==== Fifth war patrol ====
With a five-man film crew embarked to capture footage for the propaganda film Gochin! ("Sunk!") and a Yokosuka E14Y1 (Allied reporting name "Glen") floatplane aboard, I-10 departed Penang at 16:00 on 2 September 1943 and headed back into the Indian Ocean to begin her fifth war patrol, assigned a patrol area in the Gulf of Aden. On 14 September, she torpedoed and sank the 6,361-gross register ton Norwegian tanker Bramora — which was carrying oil from Bandar Abbas, Iran, to Melbourne, Australia — southwest of the Chagos Archipelago at 06°00′N 067°00′E. At dawn on 20 September 1943, her floatplane flew a reconnaissance mission over Perim Island in the Bab-el-Mandeb to investigate a report that the Allies had constructed an airfield there, but its crew found no airfield on the island.

I-10 returned to the Gulf of Aden, where at about 02:00 on 24 September 1943 she sighted the American 7,634-gross register ton Liberty ship SS Elias Howe 75 nautical miles (139 km; 86 mi) southeast of Aden. She fired two torpedoes at 03:12, one of which struck Elias Howe, killing two men in her engine room and starting a large fire. Elias Howe transmitted an SOS. I-10 surfaced and hit Elias Howe with another torpedo, and 15 minutes after the second hit explosives aboard Elias Howe detonated. Elias Howe sank by the stern at 11°40′N 044°35′E. The Royal Navy armed trawler HMS Aiglon and a seaplane rescued Elias Howe′s survivors.

At about 16:30 on 1 October 1943, I-10 sighted an Allied convoy in the Gulf of Aden heading west at 10 knots (19 km/h; 12 mph) and set out in pursuit. She fired three torpedoes at the 4,836-gross register ton Norwegian armed merchant ship SS Storviken, which was carrying a cargo of coal from Mombasa in British East Africa to Aden. Two torpedoes hit Storviken on her starboard side, and she sank by the stern at 11°4′N 048°07′E. I-10 took two members of her crew prisoner.

At around 16:10 on 4 October 1943, I-10 detected the sound of multiple propellers while submerged in the Gulf of Aden, and soon sighted Convoy AP-47, consisting nine merchant ships bound from Aden to Abadan escorted by two destroyers. I-10 pursued the convoy, surfacing after sunset. When 140 nautical miles (259 km; 161 mi) northwest of Cape Guardafui, the northernmost tip of British Somaliland, at 05;10 on 5 October, she fired three torpedoes at overlapping targets at a range of 6,340 yards (5,800 m), then dived to 390 feet (119 m). One torpedo struck the 9,057-gross register ton Norwegian armed tanker SS Anna Knudsen on her starboard bow at 14°20′N 050°47′E. As major flooding progressed, her master ordered her crew to abandon ship, but the crew returned to Anna Knudsen when the flooding abated. I-10′s crew, meanwhile, reported hearing three loud explosions followed by breaking-up noises indicating the sinking of one or more ships, and claimed three merchant ships sunk. I-10 suffered minor damage to her engine room during a brief depth-charging by the convoy′s escorts.

In the Indian Ocean near Addu Atoll on 24 October 1943 at 11:25, I-10 fired two torpedoes at the British 4,533-gross register ton armed motor vessel MV Congella, which was on a voyage from Calcutta in British India to Durban, South Africa, carrying 8,700 tons of general cargo. Both torpedoes missed, so I-10 surfaced and opened gunfire, starting a fire aboard Congella. Congella′s crew abandoned ship, and she sank at 01°02′N 071°14′E. I-10 took her radio operator prisoner. The British whaling ship Okapi and two Royal Air Force Catalina flying boats rescued her other 37 survivors. Three gunners and 25 crew died in her sinking. I-10 concluded her patrol with her return to Penang on 30 October 1943.

==== November 1943–February 1944 ====
I-10 departed Penang on 5 November 1943, called at Singapore from 7 November to 7 December 1943, and then proceeded to Sasebo, which she reached on 16 December 1943. She underwent repairs and an overhaul at Sasebo, during which she was attached directly to 6th Fleet headquarters on 1 January 1944. When her repairs were complete, I-10 departed Sasebo on 3 February 1944 bound for Truk. On 9 February 1944, Fleet Radio Unit, Melbourne (FRUMEL), an Allied signals intelligence unit in Melbourne, Australia, decrypted a Japanese message reporting that I-10 would arrive at Truk via the North Channel on 10 February 1944, but she arrived safely at Truk on 10 February despite the Allied knowledge of her schedule.

==== Operation Hailstone ====
During I-10′s stay at Truk, U.S. Navy Task Force 58 conducted Operation Hailstone, a major attack on Truk by carrier aircraft supported by anti-shipping sweeps around the atoll by surface warships, on 17 and 18 February 1944. I-10 suffered three killed and two wounded and sustained minor damage during the first day of the raid, but she and the submarines Ro-36 and Ro-42 put to sea on 17 February in an attempt to intercept the attacking ships. I-10 searched for them east of Dublon (known to the Japanese as Natsushima) without success and returned to Truk.

==== Sixth war patrol ====
I-10 departed Truk for her sixth war patrol on 25 February 1944, intending to operate off the U.S. West Coast. On 4 March 1944, however, she suffered damage in a depth-charge attack in the Pacific Ocean east of Mili Atoll and was forced to abort her patrol. She arrived at Yokosuka on 20 March 1944 for repairs. While she was under repair, workers probably installed an E27 Type 3 radar detector and a Type 3 sonar aboard her.

==== Seventh war patrol ====
With her repairs complete, I-10 left Yokosuka on 4 May 1944 with a Yokosuka E14Y1 (Allied reporting name "Glen") floatplane embarked to begin her seventh war patrol, assigned a patrol area in the Pacific Ocean east of the Marshall Islands. After dark on 12 June 1944, her floatplane reconnoitered the American fleet anchorage at Majuro Atoll, but an American expeditionary force had departed Majuro six days earlier, and the plane's crew found no ships there. Upon returning to I-10, the floatplane capsized and was lost, although I-10 recovered its crew.

On 13 June 1944, the commander-in-chief of the Combined Fleet, Admiral Soemu Toyoda, activated Operation A-Go for the defense of the Mariana Islands and ordered the commander-in-chief of the 6th Fleet, Vice Admiral Takeo Takagi on Saipan, to redeploy all 6th Fleet submarines to the Marianas. Takagi, in turn, ordered all 18 available submarines, including I-10, to deploy east of the Marianas. The Marianas campaign began on 15 June 1944 with U.S. landings on Saipan, beginning the Battle of Saipan and disrupting communications with Takagi, so the commander of Submarine Squadron 7, Rear Admiral Noboru Owada, took temporary command of the 6th Fleet and ordered all but six of the submarines to withdraw from the Marianas. I-10 was among the six ordered to remain.

On 24 June 1944, the Combined Fleet ordered Owada to evacuate Takagi and his staff from their headquarters on the eastern coast of Saipan. I-10 was operating east of Saipan at the time, so Owada ordered her to conduct the evacuation. At 12:00 Japan Standard Time on 28 June 1944, I-10 reported that she was 40 nautical miles (74 km; 46 mi) northeast of Saipan and had not found it possible to break through the cordon of American ships off Saipan to reach Takagi and his staff. The Japanese never heard from her again, and on 2 July 1944 declared her to be presumed lost off Saipan with all 103 hands.

==== Loss ====
In fact, I-10 had not yet been lost on 2 July, but she did not survive much longer. At 17:02 on 4 July 1944, U.S. Navy Task Group 50.17, with six tankers and the escort carrier USS Breton, was refueling at sea 110 nautical miles (200 km; 130 mi) northeast of Saipan when the destroyer escort USS Riddle gained sound contact on a submerged submarine bearing 250 degrees at a range of 1,900 yards (1,740 m). While the task group made an emergency turn to port, Riddle quickly dropped five depth charges. Riddle then began an approach for another attack but the submarine turned into the wakes of the ships of the retiring task group, and Riddle lost contact in the turbulence.

After 18 minutes, Riddle regained contact at a range of 1,250 yards (1,140 m). She fired three patterns of Hedgehog projectiles, but the submarine dived deeper and maneuvered aggressively, avoiding the projectiles. At 18:12, Riddle made another attack with a full pattern of depth charges set to explode deep, but without result.

Riddle passed the estimated range, bearing, and course of the submarine to the destroyer USS David W. Taylor, which established contact on the submarine at 18:22. David W. Taylor dropped 11 depth charges set to explode at medium depth. Riddle was about to begin another attack when a heavy underwater explosion occurred directly ahead of her at 18:28. Neither ship obtained any more contacts, and by sunset oil and debris had reached the surface at 15°26′N 147°48′E. It marked the demise of I-10. On 5 July 1944, an oil slick extended 9 nautical miles (17 km; 10 mi) downwind from the point of attack.

The Japanese removed I-10 from the Navy list on 10 October 1944.

== Summery of raiding history ==
Date	Name	Classification	Tonnage	Nationality	Result
10 December 1941	Donerail	Freighter	4,473	Panama	Sunk
6 June 1942	Atlantic Gulf	Cargo ship	2,639	Panama	Sunk
6 June 1942	Melvin H. Baker	Freighter	5,000	USA	Sunk
8 June 1942	King Lud	Merchant ship	5,224	Britain	Sunk
28 June 1942	Queen Victoria	Merchant ship	4,937	Britian	Sunk
30 June 1942	Express	Freighter	6,736	USA	Sunk
6 July 1942	Nymphe	Merchant ship	4,504	Greece	Sunk
8 July 1942	Hartismere	Merchant ship	5,498	Britian	Sunk
9 July 1942	Alchiba	Merchant ship	4,427	Netherlands	Sunk
30 January 1943	Samuel Gompers	Cargo ship	7,176	USA	Sunk
1 March 1943	Gulfwave	Tanker	7,141	USA	Damaged
22 July 1943	Alcides	Tanker	7,634	Norway	Sunk
14 September 1943	Bramora	Tanker	6,361	Norway	Sunk
24 September 1943	Elias Howe	Merchant ship	7,634	USA	Sunk
1 October 1943	Storviken	Merchant ship	4,836	Norway	Sunk
2 October 1943	Anna Knudsen	Tanker	9,057	Norway	Damaged
24 October 1943	Congella	Merchant ship	4,533	British	Sunk
