= Alfred C. Malchiodi =

Alfred Charles Malchiodi Jr.
- Born: July 18, 1942 (age 83); New London, Connecticut
- Died: February 28, 2011 (aged 68)
- Occupation: Electrical Engineer

Alfred C. Malchiodi (1942–2011) was a noted American engineer specializing in submarines.

== Biography ==
Malchiodi was born July 18, 1942, in New London, the son of the late Alfred and Josephine (Donatello) Malchiodi.

After graduating from New London High School, he attended Worcester Polytechnic Institute, graduating with a degree in electrical engineering in 1964.

Malchiodi married Tillie Oppido on June 1, 1968.

He was employed by Electric Boat for over 40 years as an electrical engineer. After working on the USS Narwhal (SSN-671), USS Glenard P. Lipscomb (SSN-685) and NR-1 Deep Submergence Craft, he became Chief Engineer for the Trident Program and USS Memphis (SSN-691), then Director of Engineering for Virginia class submarines. On retirement he was Director of Submarine Concept Formulation.

In 2000, he received the General Dynamics Technology Excellence Award. In 2003 he received the Gibbs Brothers Medal from the National Academy of Sciences for leading innovations in developing the naval architecture of submarines for the efficient utilization of advanced technology.

Malchiodi retired in 2005. He died on February 28, 2011, of lung cancer.
