= Antonio Malchiodi =

Italian painter

Antonio Malchiodi (June 1848 – 1915 ) was an Italian painter, mainly of figure painting.

He was born in Piacenza. He first trained at the local Istituto Gazzola, and gained a subsidy from the Institute (and the city council) to travel to Rome. At Rome, at the Accademia di San Luca, he studied under the painter from Bergamo, Francesco Coghetti.

Among his works are: Il nido d'uccelli; Il rimprovero; Bue; Don Rodrigo; La comunione; Il Battesimo; St Jerome; Infanzia e Vecchiezza; Ciceruacchio; La Premiazione, commissioned by the Ministry of the Public Instruction. He also completed four large canvases for the mortuary chapel of the family of the ex-minister Doppino.

He taught as a docent at the Academy of Fine Arts of Modena, but also at Brescia and Turin. He spent his last years painting landscapes around Bergamo, and is also known for his genre and historical paintings, including “The last consolation of Torquato Tasso” painted only after visiting the room in the convent Sant’Onofrio where the poet died.

Malchiodi died in Nembro in 1915.
