= Harold E. Saunders =

American hydrodynamicist (1890–1961)

Harold Eugene Saunders (1890–1961), was the leading hydrodynamicist in the United States in the mid 20th century. He is best known for the 3-volume book, Hydrodynamics in Ship Design.

== Naval career and design work ==
Saunders had a career in the United States Navy, eventually as Captain. He spent much of his career at the Portsmouth, New Hampshire Navy yard, engaged in submarine design and construction. In 1927-28 he was salvage officer in charge of raising the submarine S-4 which sank off Cape Cod following a collision. For this work he was awarded the Navy Distinguished Service Medal.

Saunders was a member of the first and second Byrd expeditions to Antarctica, serving as geographer. The Saunders Ice Shelf, Saunders Coast and Saunders Mountain are named for him.

Saunders was very good friends with Admiral Byrd and was nicknamed "Savvy Saunders" (source: signed copy of "Alone" by Admiral Byrd)

During World War II Saunders directed construction of the David Taylor Model Basin at Carderock, Maryland, near the Potomac River west of Washington, D.C. This site is now the Carderock Division of the Naval Surface Warfare Center (NSWCCD). The NSWCCD Maneuvering and Seakeeping Basin (MASK), completed in 1963, is dedicated to Saunders.

Saunders is still often cited as an authoritative source on the resistance and propulsion of ships, especially naval ships. A number of his published works appear in the list of references in the Society of Naval Architects and Marine Engineer's Principles of Naval Architecture. The American Society of Naval Engineers presents the annual Harold E. Saunders award in his honor.

== Publications ==
- "The Prediction of Speed and Power of Ships by Methods in Use at the United States Experimental Model Basin Washington", Navy Bureau of Construction and Repair, C and R Bulletin No. 7, Government Printing Office, Washington: 1933.
- Hydrodynamics in Ship Design of which the first two volumes appeared in 1957 and the third, posthumous volume, was published in 1965, by the Society of Naval Architects and Marine Engineers, New York (SNAME).
