= Society of Naval Architects and Marine Engineers =

Global professional society

The Society of Naval Architects and Marine Engineers
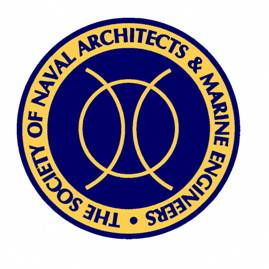
- Founded: 1893
- Type: Professional Organization
- Purpose: "To advance the art, science, and practice of naval architecture, shipbuilding and marine engineering"
- Region served: Worldwide
- Method: Industry standards, Conferences, Publications
- Members: 6,500+
- Key people: Elizabeth Bouchard (Executive Director) Richard Mueller (President 2025-2027)
- Website: www.sname.org

The Society of Naval Architects and Marine Engineers (SNAME) is a global professional society that provides a forum for the advancement of the engineering profession as applied to the marine field. Although it particularly names the naval architecture and marine engineering specialties, the society includes all types of engineers and professionals amongst its members and is dedicated to advancing the art, science and practice of naval architecture and marine engineering.

== Mission ==
The mission of the Society is to advance the art, science and practice of naval architecture, marine engineering, ocean engineering, and other marine-related professions through:

- The global exchange of knowledge and ideas relative to the marine industry
- Education in engineering as it relates to the marine industry
- Encouraging and sponsoring research and development in naval architecture, marine engineering, ocean engineering and other marine fields.

== History ==
The Society of Naval Architects and Marine Engineers was organized in 1893, to advance the art, science, and practice of naval architecture, shipbuilding, and marine engineering.

In its earliest days, SNAME was incorporated and nurtured by men including William H. Webb, George E. Weed, Rear Admiral George W. Melville. Other men took the helm thereafter, including Edwin A. Stevens, David W. Taylor, Vice Admiral Land, Kenneth M Davidson, Dr. Alvin C. Purdy, and Blakely Smith.

== Membership ==
SNAME offers various membership grades, including student, associate, full member and fellow status. Full members generally have earned a Bachelor of Science degree in naval architecture, marine engineering or hold a degree in engineering and have experience that is associated with ship design, construction or operation. However membership is open to professionals in related industries that comes from all backgrounds and experience.

Marine design is inherently a wide-ranging engineering design field and SNAME has members with wide experience ranging from electrical engineering, to weapons systems design, to racing yacht design, to deep ocean engineering, to human factors. Members can be awarded Fellow status upon review and approval of their achievements in the naval architectural or engineering profession as applied to the marine field. The society also awards the David W. Taylor Medal for "notable achievement in naval architecture and/or marine engineering."

== Publications ==
SNAME publishes peer-reviewed technical papers and authoritative text books on engineering subjects within the marine field. The society also is a repository and forum for original research and analysis through its Technology and Research Committees which are staffed by volunteers with exceptional experience and knowledge in their chosen specialties.

== Code of Ethics ==
The society functions under its own code of engineering ethics, which generally follows the Professional Engineers Code of Ethics. The Society also develops and supports the United States Naval Architects and Marine Engineers (NAME) Principles and Practice of Engineering Exam.
