= List of Maryland Terrapins football honorees =

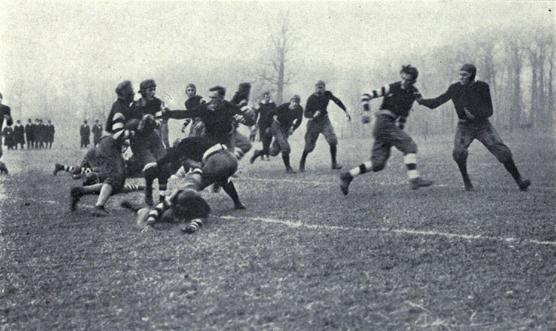
Since the Maryland Terrapins football team was founded in 1892, scores of its players have been named All-Americans, received national awards, and been inducted into various halls of fame.

The Maryland Terrapins football team was founded in 1892 to represent the University of Maryland in intercollegiate competition and has participated in the sport all but one season since its inception. Over the course of the team's history, the Terrapins' performance has run the gamut from national championships to winless seasons.

During periods of both ascendancy and mediocrity, individual Maryland players of exceptional ability have received various accolades. In total, Terrapins have been named to an All-America team 58 times, an All-Atlantic Coast Conference team 196 times, an All-Big Ten Conference team 7 times, and an All-Southern Conference team 14 times. Of the All-America selections, twenty-three players received first-team honors a total of twenty-eight times. Eleven players were named consensus first-team All-Americans a total of twelve times, and five players were named first-team All-Americans by unanimous consensus.

Terrapins have won several nationally recognized individual awards, including the Chuck Bednarik Award, the Dick Butkus Award, the Lombardi Award, and the Outland Trophy, each of which recognizes the best player at a particular position in a given season. The College Football Hall of Fame has inducted six former Maryland players, and the Pro Football Hall of Fame has enshrined two. Four former Maryland head coaches have also been inducted into the College Football Hall of Fame. The University of Maryland Athletic Hall of Fame has inducted sixty-two former football lettermen and two former head coaches who were not alumni.

== All-Americans ==
Each year, numerous publications and organizations release lists of All-America teams, hypothetical rosters of players considered the best in the nation at their respective positions. Some selecting organizations choose more than one roster of All-Americans, in which case they use the terms "first team", "second team", and "third team" as appropriate. Some selectors also award honorable mentions to outstanding players who did not make any of their teams.

The National Collegiate Athletic Association (NCAA), a college sports governing body, uses officially recognized All-America selectors to determine the "consensus" selections. These are based on a point system in which a player is awarded three points for every selector that names him to the first team, two points for the second team, and one point for the third team. The individual who receives the most points at his position is called a consensus All-American. Over time, the sources used to determine the consensus selections have changed, and since 2002, the NCAA has used these five selectors to determine consensus All-Americans: the Associated Press (AP), American Football Coaches Association (AFCA), Football Writers Association of America (FWAA), The Sporting News (TSN), and the Walter Camp Football Foundation (WCFF).

In 1923, end Bill Supplee was selected to the Associated Press second team, which made him the first Maryland player to be named an All-American. Guard Bob Ward became the first Terrapin named to a first team when he received that honor from AP and the Football Writers Association of America in 1950. The following year, Ward became Maryland's first consensus All-American when he was unanimously chosen by every NCAA-recognized selector. Five other Terrapins have earned consensus All-America honors: Jack Scarbath in 1952, Stan Jones in 1953, Bob Pellegrini in 1955, Randy White in 1974, and linebacker E. J. Henderson in 2001. Henderson was also named a consensus All-American in 2002, which made him the first, and thus far only, Maryland player to receive the honor twice.

Key
First-team selection *	Second-team selection †	Third-team selection ‡
For a guide to the abbreviations used, see the glossary.

Year	Player	Position	First team	Second team	Third team	Remarks
1923	Bill Supplee^{†}	E	—	AP	—	—
1928	Gerald Snyder^{†}	FB	—	AP	—	—
1949	Ray Krouse^{†}	T	—	AP	—	—
1950	Bob Ward*	G	AP, FWAA	UPI	—	—
1951	Bob Ward*	G	AFCA, AP, FWAA, INS, TSN, UPI, WCFF	—	—	unanimous
1951	Dick Modzelewski^{†}	T	—	AP	—	—
1951	Ed Modzelewski^{†}	FB	—	AP, UPI	—	—
1952	Dick Modzelewski*	T	AP, INS, TSN, UPI, WCFF	—	—	consensus
1952	Jack Scarbath*	QB	AP, INS, Look, TSN, UPI, WCFF	—	—	unanimous
1952	Tom Cosgrove^{†}	C	—	INS, NEA	—	—
1953	Bernie Faloney*	QB	INS, TSN	AP, UPI	—	—
1953	Stan Jones*	T	AP, INS, TSN, UPI	—	—	unanimous
1953	Chet Hanulak^{†}	RB	—	INS	—	—
1954	Bill Walker^{†}	E	—	AP	—	—
1955	Bob Pellegrini*	C	AP, INS, TSN, UPI, WCFF	—	—	unanimous
1955	Mike Sandusky*	T	TSN	UPI	—	—
1955	Ed Vereb^{†}	RB	—	INS	—	—
1955	Bill Walker^{†}	E	—	UPI	—	—
1956	Mike Sandusky*	T	CSW	—	—	—
1961	Gary Collins*	E	AFCA, FWAA, WCFF	AP, UPI	—	consensus
1973	Paul Vellano*	G	AFCA	UPI	—	—
1973	Randy White*	DT	AP	—	—	—
1974	Steve Mike-Mayer*	K	TSN, Time	—	—	—
1974	Randy White*	DT	AFCA, AP, FN, FWAA, Time, TSN, UPI	—	—	unanimous
1974	Louis Carter^{†}	HB	—	FN	—	
1976	Joe Campbell*	DT	AFCA, TSN, FWAA	AP, UPI	FN	consensus
1978	Steve Atkins^{‡}	RB	—	—	FN	—
1978	Charles Johnson^{‡}	DL	—	—	FN	—
1979	Dale Castro*	K	FWAA, TSN, UPI, WCFF	FN	—	consensus
1983	Boomer Esiason^{†}	QB	—	TSN	—	—
1983	Ron Solt^{†}	OG	—	TSN	—	—
1984	Kevin Glover*	C	TSN	—	—	—
1984	Eric Wilson*	LB	FN	AP	—	—
1985	J. D. Maarleveld*	OT	AFCA, UPI	TSN	—	consensus
1985	Al Covington^{‡}	DB	—	—	FN	—
1987	Ferrell Edmunds^{‡}	TE	—	—	AP	—
1994	Steve Ingram^{†}	OT	—	FN	—	—
1999	LaMont Jordan^{†}	RB	—	FN	TSN	—
1999	Lewis Sanders^{‡}	DB	—	—	TSN	—
2001	E. J. Henderson*	LB	AP, CBS, CNN, FN, FWAA, TSN, WCFF	—	—	consensus
2001	Daryl Whitmer*	C	ESPN	—	—	—
2001	Brooks Barnard^{†}	P	—	FN	CBS	—
2001	Melvin Fowler^{‡}	C	—	—	FN	—
2002	E. J. Henderson*	LB	AFCA, AP, CBS, CFN, CNN, ESPN, FWAA, WCFF	TSN	—	consensus
2002	Todd Wike*	C	ESPN	CFN	—	—
2002	Steve Suter^{†}	RS	—	CNN, TSN	—	—
2002	Madieu Williams^{‡}	DB	—	—	TSN	—
2002	Matt Crawford^{‡}	OT	—	—	TSN	—
2003	Randy Starks^{†}	DT	—	TSN	—	—
2003	C. J. Brooks^{‡}	OG	—	—	CFN	—
2004	D'Qwell Jackson*	LB	CFN	—	—	—
2004	Domonique Foxworth^{†}	DB	—	TSN	—	—
2005	Vernon Davis*	TE	AFCA, AP, CFN	CNN	—	—
2005	D'Qwell Jackson*	LB	AFCA, AP, CFN	CNN, TSN	—	—
2007	Andrew Crummey^{†}	OG	—	TSN	AP	—
2014	Brad Craddock*	K	FWAA	AP, WCFF	—	—
2015	William Likely*	RS	FWAA	USAT	—	—
2018	Tre Watson^{†}	LB	—	FWAA	—	—
References:; Key: * First team; ^{†} Second team; ^{‡} Third team. For expansions of abbreviations see the glossary.

== All-conference honorees ==
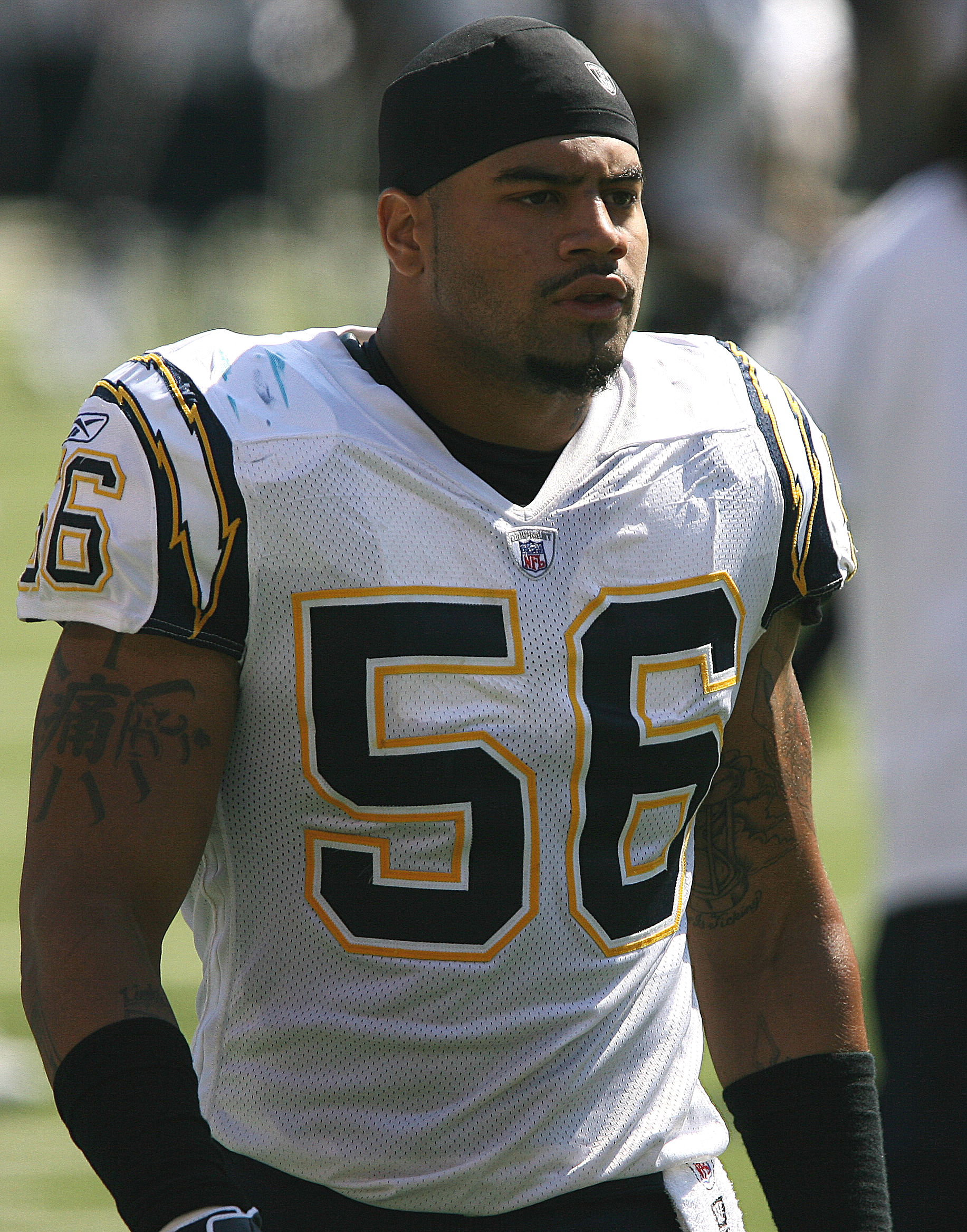
Shawne Merriman was a 2004 first-team All-ACC defensive end.

Just as the media recognizes the nation's best players with All-America lists, individual athletic conferences honor their best players with "all-conference" selections. In 1921, Maryland joined the Southern Conference (SoCon). Thirteen years later, Norwood Sothoron became the first Terrapin named to an All-Southern Conference team. Maryland was a member of the league from 1921 to 1952, and twelve Terrapins received All-Southern Conference honors a total of fourteen times.

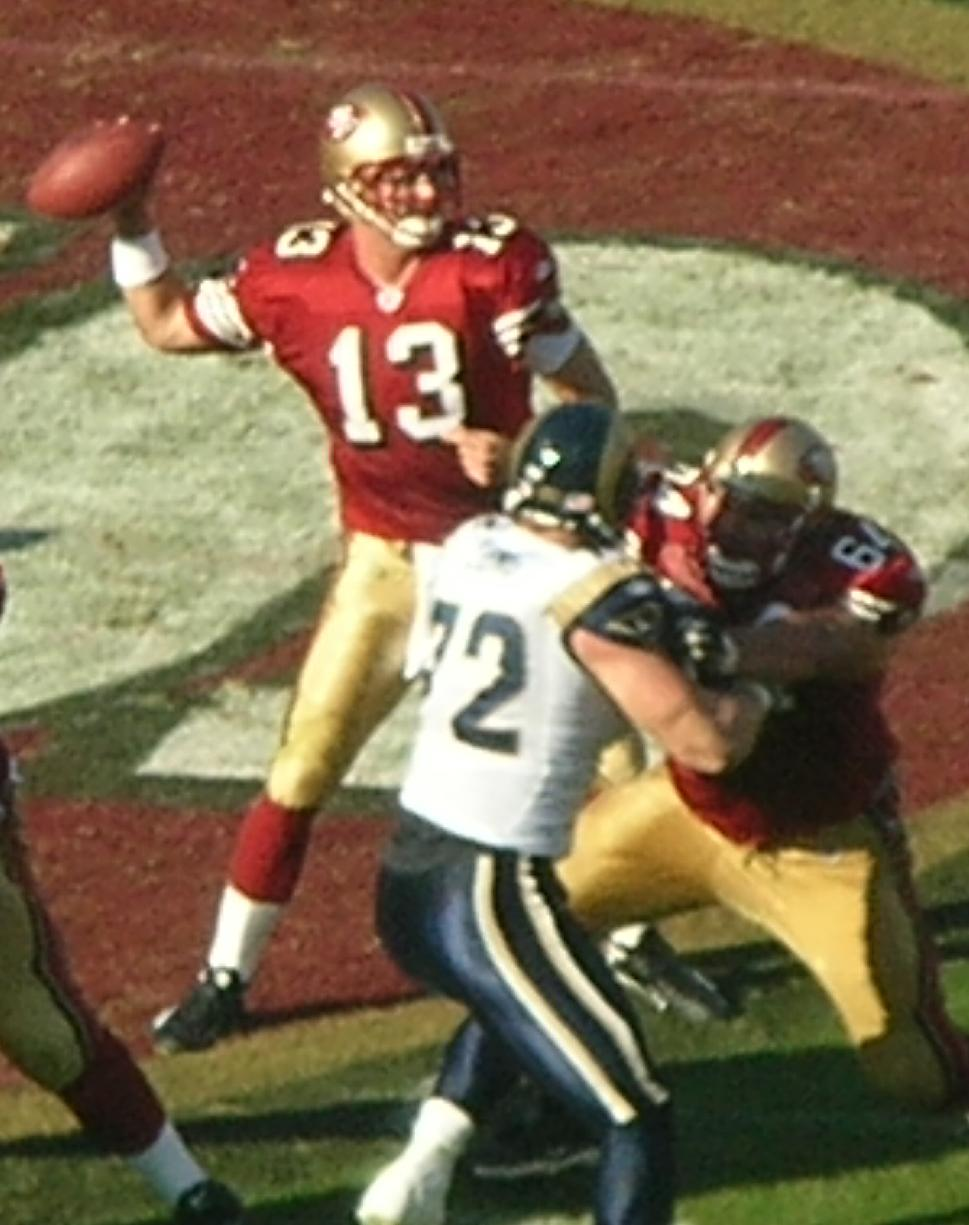
Quarterback Shaun Hill led the record-setting 2001 team.

After the 1952 season, Maryland and six other schools left the Southern Conference to form the Atlantic Coast Conference (ACC). The following year, the conference honored its inaugural season's best players with an All-ACC team. In that initial class, five Terrapins were selected to the first team and two to the second team. From 1953 to 2013, Maryland players received first-team All-ACC honors a total of 134 times. Terrapins were named to All-ACC second or third teams an additional 62 times, although those teams were not published continuously and there was not always a third team. Since Maryland moved to the Big Ten Conference in 2014, five Terrapins have been named to All-Big Ten first teams, and two have earned second-team honors.

When the NCAA abolished the one-platoon system in 1965, the ACC began naming separate all-conference offensive and defensive teams. In 1974, Maryland won its first ACC championship since 1955, and a school record six Terrapins were named to the conference's first team. Maryland secured the title again in 1975 and 1976, and surpassed the previous mark when seven Terrapins were named first-team All-ACC for each of those seasons. The 2001 squad set a new benchmark when eight players made the first team, and the 2002 Terrapins equaled that feat.

In 2003, the Atlantic Coast Conference published the "ACC 50th Anniversary Football Team", a list of the league's fifty best players from its first half-century as chosen by a 120-member committee. Four former Terrapins were included on the list: Boomer Esiason, a Maryland quarterback from 1981 to 1983; Stan Jones, a tackle from 1951 to 1953; Bob Pellegrini, a guard from 1953 to 1955; and Randy White, a defensive tackle from 1972 to 1974.

Key
First-team selection *	Second-team selection †	Third-team selection ‡
For a guide to the abbreviations used, see the glossary.

Year	Player	Position
1953	John Bowersox*	G
1953	Bernie Faloney*	B
1953	Chet Hanulak*	B
1953	Stan Jones*	T
1953	Ralph Felton^{†}	DB
1953	Bob Morgan^{†}	DT
1953	Bill Walker^{†}	E
1954	Dick Bielski*	B
1954	Bill Walker*	E
1954	Ron Waller*	B
1954	John Irvine^{†}	C
1954	Bob Pellegrini^{†}	G
1955	Jack Davis*	G
1955	Bob Pellegrini*	C
1955	Mike Sandusky*	T
1955	Ed Vereb*	B
1955	Russell Dennis^{†}	E
1955	Frank Tamburello^{†}	B
1955	Bill Walker^{†}	E
1956	Jack Davis*	G
1956	Mike Sandusky*	T
1957	Rodney Breedlove*	G
1957	Ed Cooke*	E
1957	Gene Alderton^{†}	C
1958	Rodney Breedlove^{†}	G
1958	Fred Cole^{†}	T
1959	Tom Gunderman^{†}	G
1959	Jim Joyce^{†}	B
1960	Gary Collins*	E
1961	Gary Collins*	E
1961	Bob Hacker*	C
1961	Bill Kirchiro^{†}	G
1961	Roger Shoals^{†}	T
1962	Tom Brown*	B
1962	Walter Rock*	G
1962	Dick Shiner*	B
1963	Dick Shiner^{†}	B
1964	Jerry Fishman*	G
1964	Olaf Drozdov^{†}	T
1964	Thom Hickey^{†}	B
1965	Bob Sullivan*	B
1966	Dick Absher*	E
1969	Ralph Sonntag*	T
1970	Guy Roberts*	E
1971	Dan Bungori*	E
1972	Bob Smith*	DB
1972	Paul Vellano*	LB
1973	Louis Carter*	RB
1973	Bob Smith*	DB
1973	Paul Vellano*	DL
1973	Randy White*	DL
1974	Louis Carter*	RB
1974	Steve Mike-Mayer*	K
1974	Stan Rogers*	T
1974	Bob Smith*	DB
1974	Harry Walters*	LB
1974	Randy White*	DL
1975	Kevin Benson*	LB
1975	Jim Brechbiel*	DB
1975	Joe Campbell*	DL
1975	Paul Divito*	DL
1975	LeRoy Hughes*	LB
1975	Marion Koprowski*	T
1975	Mike Sochko*	K
1976	Joe Campbell*	DL
1976	Brad Carr*	LB
1976	Ed Fulton*	G
1976	Mark Manges*	QB

Year	Player	Position
1976	Ken Roy*	DB
1976	Tom Schick*	T
1976	Larry Seder*	DL
1977	Ted Klaube*	DL
1978	Steve Atkins*	RB
1978	Lloyd Burruss*	DB
1978	Charles Johnson*	DL
1978	Bruce Palmer*	DL
1979	Dale Castro*	K
1979	Larry Stewart*	T
1979	Charlie Wysocki*	RB
1980	Lloyd Burruss*	DB
1980	Marlin Van Horn*	DL
1980	Charlie Wysocki*	RB
1982	Jess Atkinson*	K
1982	Mark Duda*	DL
1982	Dave Pacella*	T
1983	Clarence Baldwin*	DB
1983	Pete Koch*	DL
1983	Ron Solt*	G
1983	Eric Wilson*	LB
1984	Al Covington*	DB
1984	Kevin Glover*	C
1984	Greg Hill*	WR
1984	Bruce Mesner*	DL
1984	Eric Wilson*	LB
1985	Al Covington*	DB
1985	Keeta Covington*	DB
1985	Chuck Faucette*	LB
1985	Len Lynch*	G
1985	J. D. Maarleveld*	T
1986	Keeta Covington	DB
1985	Bruce Mesner*	DL
1986	Chuck Faucette*	LB
1986	Bruce Mesner*	DL
1987	Ferrell Edmunds*	E
1987	Kevin Walker*	LB
1988	Dan Plocki*	K
1988	Warren Powers*	DL
1989	Larry Webster^{†}	DT
1990	Barry Johnson*	WR
1991	Mitch Suplee*	C
1991	Dan DeArmas^{†}	K
1991	Frank Wycheck^{†}	TE
1991	Mike Jarmolowich^{†}	LB
1991	Mike Webster^{†}	DL
1992	Marcus Badgett*	WR
1992	Mike Jarmolowich^{†}	LB
1993	Scott Milanovich*	P
1993	Jermaine Lewis^{†}	WR
1993	Steve Ingram^{‡}	OT
1993	Scott Milanovich^{‡}	QB
1994	Steve Ingram*	T
1994	Scott Milanovich^{†}	QB
1994	Geroy Simon^{†}	WR
1995	Jermaine Lewis*	WR
1995	Andreal Johnson^{†}	DB
1995	Eric Ogbogu^{†}	LB
1998	Eric Barton*	LB
1998	LaMont Jordan^{†}	RB
1999	Delbert Cowsette*	OT
1999	LaMont Jordan*	RB
1999	Lewis Sanders*	CB
1999	Brad Messina^{†}	OL
1999	John Waerig^{†}	TE
1999	Jamie Wu^{†}	OL
2000	LaMont Jordan*	RB
2000	Kris Jenkins^{†}	DL

Year	Player	Position
2001	Brooks Barnard*	P
2001	Melvin Fowler*	OC
2001	E. J. Henderson*	LB
2001	Tony Jackson*	DB
2001	Tony Okanlawon*	DB
2001	Bruce Perry*	RB
2001	Daryl Whitmer*	WR
2001	Todd Wike*	OG
2001	Matt Crawford^{†}	OT
2001	Guilian Gary^{†}	WR
2001	Shaun Hill^{†}	QB
2002	Brooks Barnard*	P
2002	Matt Crawford*	OT
2002	Chris Downs*	RB
2002	Domonique Foxworth*	DB
2002	E. J. Henderson*	LB
2002	Nick Novak*	K
2002	Steve Suter*	RS
2002	Todd Wike*	C
2002	Lamar Bryant^{†}	OG
2002	Randy Starks^{†}	DL
2002	Madieu Williams^{†}	DB
2003	Nick Novak*	K
2003	Randy Starks*	DL
2003	Steve Suter*	RS
2003	C. J. Brooks*	G
2003	Jeff Dugan^{†}	TE
2003	Kevin Eli^{†}	DL
2003	Domonique Foxworth^{†}	DB
2003	D'Qwell Jackson^{†}	LB
2003	Adam Podlesh^{†}	P
2003	Madieu Williams^{†}	DB
2004	C. J. Brooks*	G
2004	Domonique Foxworth*	DB
2004	D'Qwell Jackson*	LB
2004	Shawne Merriman*	DL
2004	Adam Podlesh^{†}	P
2005	Vernon Davis*	TE
2005	D'Qwell Jackson*	LB
2005	Lance Ball^{†}	RB
2005	Adam Podlesh^{†}	P
2006	Andrew Crummey^{†}	OL
2006	Erin Henderson^{†}	LB
2006	Darrius Heyward-Bey^{†}	WR
2006	Adam Podlesh^{†}	P
2007	Erin Henderson*	LB
2007	Dre Moore*	DT
2007	Andrew Crummey^{†}	OG
2008	Travis Baltz*	P
2008	Da'Rel Scott*	RB
2008	Edwin Williams*	C
2008	Alex Wujciak^{†}	LB
2010	Tony Logan*	SP
2010	Torrey Smith*	WR
2010	Kenny Tate*	S
2010	Alex Wujciak*	LB
2010	Joe Vellano^{†}	DT
2011	Joe Vellano*	DT
2012	Joe Vellano*	DT
2012	Demetrius Hartsfield^{†}	LB
2014	Brad Craddock*	K
2014	William Likely*	DB
2014	Stefon Diggs^{†}	WR
2014	Andre Monroe^{†}	DL
2015	Yannick Ngakoue*	DL
2015	William Likely*	DB, RS
2017	D.J. Moore*	WR

=== All-Southern Conference honorees ===
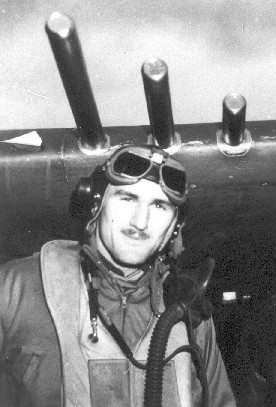
Bill Guckeyson was the second Maryland player named to the All-Southern Conference team. He received the honor back-to-back in 1935 and 1936.

Year	Player	Position
1934	Norwood Sothoron	B
1935	Bill Guckeyson	B
1936	Bill Guckeyson	B
1937	Jim Meade	B
1947	Lu Gambino	B
1949	Ray Krouse	T
1950	Bob Ward	G
1950	Elmer Wingate	E
1951	Ed Modzelewski	B
1951	Bob Ward	G
1952	Stan Jones	T
1952	Jack Scarbath	B

== Award recipients ==
Various organizations bestow awards recognizing the best player overall or at a specific position, and some of these annual awards are considered highly prestigious honors. All of the following individual awards bestowed upon Terrapins have gone to linemen and defensive players. In 1952, tackle Dick Modzelewski was awarded the Outland Trophy, for best interior lineman, and the Touchdown Club's Knute Rockne Award for best lineman. The following year, Stan Jones won the Knute Rockne Award. In 1955, the Touchdown Club bestowed its Walter Camp Memorial Trophy, for best player, and Knute Rockne Award, for best lineman, upon center Bob Pellegrini, who was also named the Lineman of the Year by United Press International (UPI). In 1974, Randy White won the Lombardi Award, for best lineman or linebacker; the Outland Trophy, for best interior lineman; and was named the UPI Lineman of the Year. In 2002, E. J. Henderson received the Chuck Bednarik Award, for best linebacker, and the Dick Butkus Award for best lineman or linebacker.

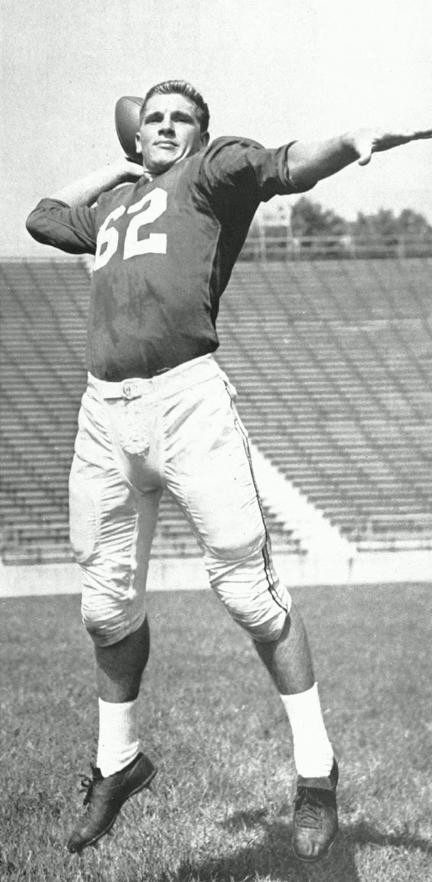
Jack Scarbath finished second in the 1952 Heisman Trophy voting.

By comparison, Maryland's offensive players and backs have fared better with conference accolades. Quarterback Jack Scarbath was named the 1952 Southern Conference Player of the Year, and Bernie Faloney received ACC Player of the Year honors the following season. In 2001, running back Bruce Perry was named the ACC Offensive Player of the Year.

No Terrapin has ever won the Heisman Trophy, but several have received votes. In 1952, quarterback Jack Scarbath was the Heisman runner-up, and his successor, Bernie Faloney, finished fourth in the voting the following year. Center Bob Pellegrini finished sixth in 1955, end Gary Collins finished eighth in 1961, defensive tackle Randy White finished ninth in 1973, and quarterback Boomer Esiason finished tenth in 1983.

After his national championship-winning season in 1953, Jim Tatum received Coach of the Year honors from the AFCA and the FWAA. He was also named coach of the year by the Southern Conference in 1951 and the Atlantic Coast Conference in 1953 and 1955. The Sporting News named Jerry Claiborne the nation's top coach in 1974, and in 1982, his successor, Bobby Ross, received that distinction from the Touchdown Club. For his first-year turnaround of a team that had one winning season in the previous decade, Ralph Friedgen received national Coach of the Year plaudits from at least eight organizations.

=== Players ===
National Award	Recipient(s) and year received
Lou Groza Award	Brad Craddock (2014)
Chuck Bednarik Award	E. J. Henderson (2002)
Dick Butkus Award	E. J. Henderson (2002)
Walter Camp Memorial Trophy	Bob Pellegrini (1955)
Lombardi Award	Randy White (1974)
Outland Trophy	Randy White (1974); Dick Modzelewski (1952)
Knute Rockne Award	Bob Ward (1951); Dick Modzelewski (1952); Stan Jones (1953); Bob Pellegrini (1955)
UPI Lineman of the Year	Bob Pellegrini (1955); Randy White (1974)
Conference Award	Recipient(s) and year received
ACC Player of the Year	Bernie Faloney (1953); Bob Pellegrini (1955); Randy White (1974); E. J. Henderson (2001)
ACC Offensive Rookie of the Year	Danny O'Brien (2010)
ACC Offensive Player of the Year	Bruce Perry (2001)
ACC Defensive Player of the Year	E.J. Henderson (2001 & 2002); D'Qwell Jackson (2005)
SoCon Player of the Year	Bob Ward (1951); Jack Scarbath (1952)
Jacobs Blocking Trophy	John Gormley (1936); Bob Pellegrini (1955); Ralph Sonntag (1969); Dave Pacella (1982)
Jim Tatum Award	Jonathan Claiborne (1997); Nick Novak (2004); Josh Wilson (2006)
Brian Piccolo Award	Al Neville (1972); David Visaggio (1974); J. D. Maarleveld (1984); Mike Anderson (1989)
Bakken–Andersen Kicker of the Year	Brad Craddock (2014)
Rodgers–Dwight Return Specialist of the Year	William Likely (2015)

=== Coaches ===
"Coach of the Year"	Recipient(s) and year received
AFCA	Jim Tatum (1953); Ralph Friedgen (2001)
Associated Press	Ralph Friedgen (2001)
Bobby Dodd Award	Ralph Friedgen (2001)
College Football News	Ralph Friedgen (2001)
CNN Sports Illustrated	Ralph Friedgen (2001)
Eddie Robinson Award	Ralph Friedgen (2001)
FWAA	Jim Tatum (1953)
Home Depot Award	Ralph Friedgen (2001)
The Sporting News	Jerry Claiborne (1974)
Walter Camp Award	Ralph Friedgen (2001)
Washington Touchdown Club	Bobby Ross (1982)
Atlantic Coast Conference	Jim Tatum (1953 & 1955); Jerry Claiborne (1973, 1974, & 1975); Bobby Ross (1983); Ralph Friedgen (2001)
Southern Conference	Jim Tatum (1951)

== Hall of Fame inductees ==
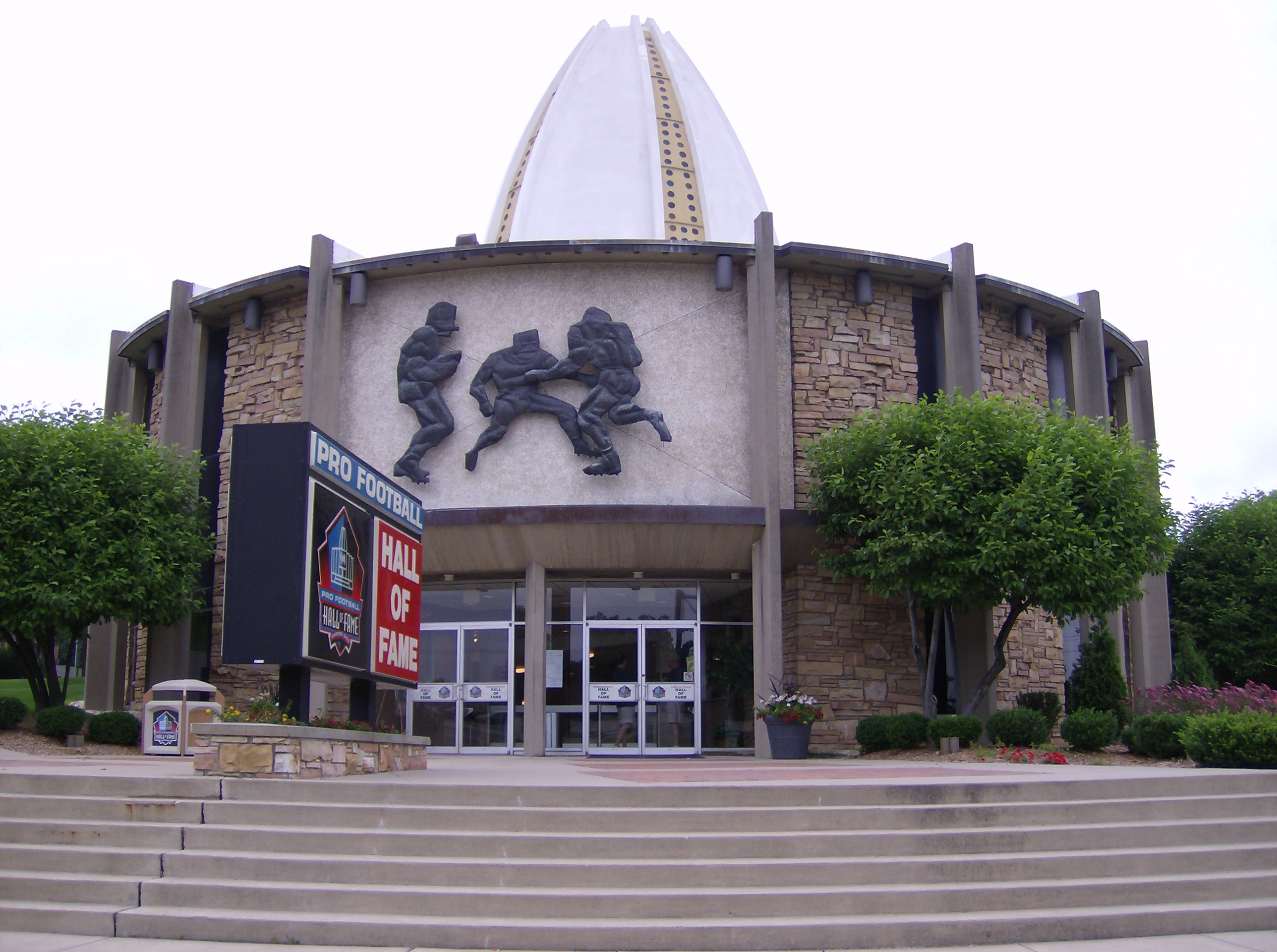
Two former Terrapins players are enshrined in the Pro Football Hall of Fame (pictured): Stan Jones and Randy White.

The College Football Hall of Fame has commemorated many of the sport's most outstanding and most innovative personalities. Among them are six former Maryland players and four former Maryland head coaches. In 1980, Bob Ward became the first Maryland player in the College Football Hall of Fame. At 5 feet 9 inches (1.75 m) and 185 pounds (84 kg), Ward was nicknamed the "watch-charm guard", but consistently outplayed much larger opponents. He also served as the team's head coach in 1967 and 1968, but without much success. In 1983, the Hall of Fame inducted former quarterback Jack Scarbath, who led Maryland to a school-record 22-game winning streak and an upset victory over first-ranked Tennessee in the 1952 "Game of the Century". That season, Scarbath was named a first-team All-American by unanimous consensus and finished as the runner-up in the Heisman Trophy vote. Tackle Dick Modzelewski, inducted in 1993, won the 1952 Outland Trophy as the nation's best lineman and later had a 14-year career in the National Football League (NFL). Center Bob Pellegrini was inducted in 1996. Named the ACC's best blocker in 1955, Pellegrini was a starter on the 1953 national championship team, the AP Poll eighth-ranked 1954 team, and the third-ranked 1955 team.

Two former Maryland players have been inducted into both the College Football Hall of Fame and the Pro Football Hall of Fame for accomplishments during their professional playing careers. Tackle Stan Jones was named a unanimous consensus All-American after the 1953 national championship campaign. After graduation, he embarked upon a 13-year NFL career that included seven consecutive Pro Bowls. Jones was inducted into the Pro Football Hall of Fame in 1991 and the College Football Hall of Fame in 2000. Defensive tackle Randy White was twice named to the All-American first team, the second time by unanimous consensus in 1974. That season, White helped Maryland to an ACC championship and received numerous lineman and player of the year accolades. During his 14-year NFL career, White played in three Super Bowls, six National Football Conference championships, and missed only one game.

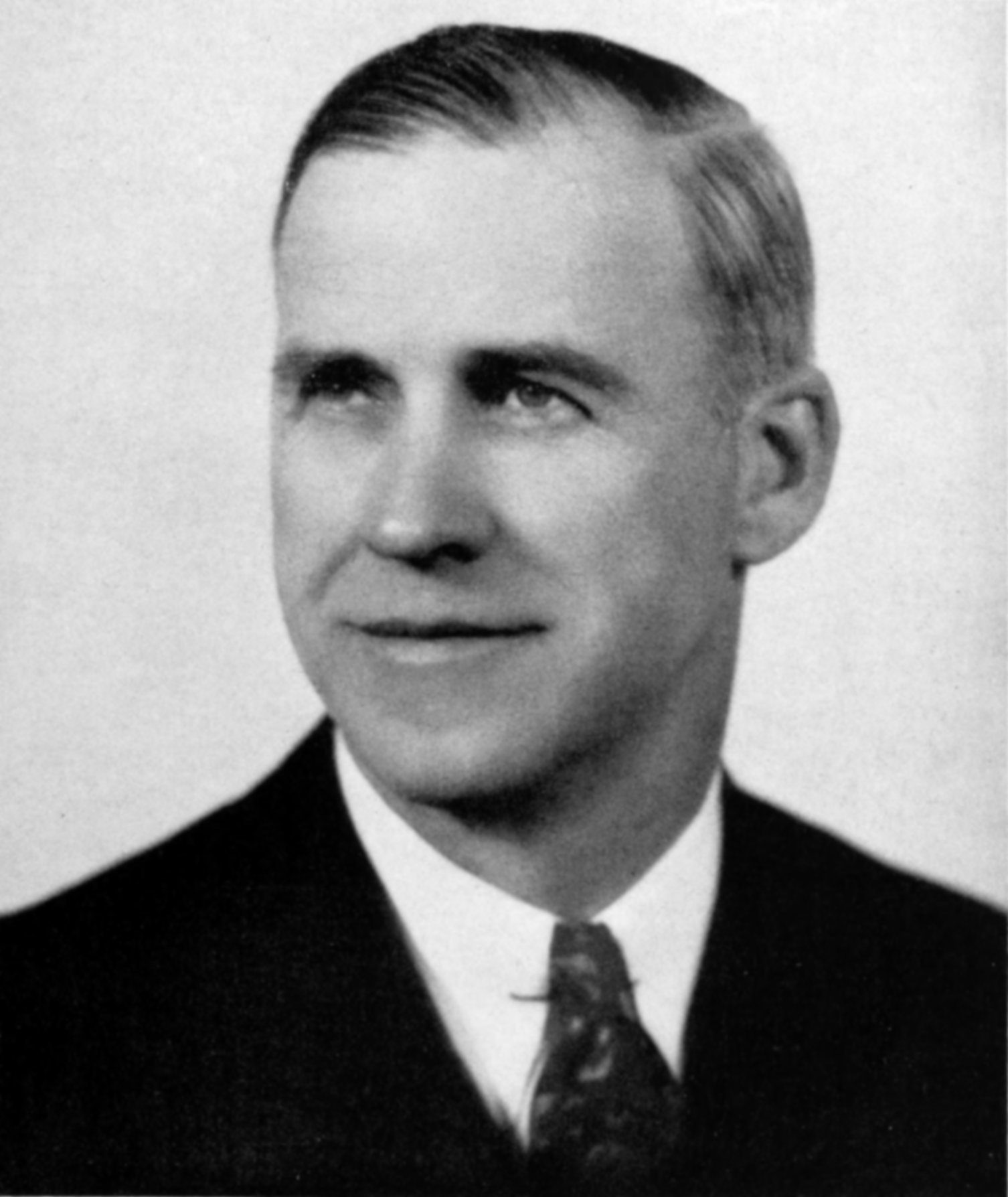
Clark Shaughnessy was the first Maryland coach inducted into the College Football Hall of Fame.

In 1968, Clark Shaughnessy became the first Maryland coach inducted into the College Football Hall of Fame. Shaughnessy pioneered the pass-oriented variation of the T-formation that largely replaced the single-wing, and he coached Maryland for two non-consecutive seasons in the 1940s. Shaughnessy mentored Terrapins quarterback and future head coach Tommy Mont, the third-ranked passer in the nation in 1942. Bear Bryant, inducted in 1986, is best known for leading Alabama to six national championships, but his first head coaching job came at Maryland in 1945. Bryant's team finished the season 6–2–1, and he later said that the Maryland position was the one "that launched me to whatever I've accomplished". Jim Tatum, inducted in 1984, served as Maryland's head coach from 1947 to 1955, and his teams secured two national championships, three conference championships, and five bowl game appearances. Tatum compiled a 73–15–4 record without a losing season, and he remains Maryland's all-time winningest coach of the modern era. When Jerry Claiborne arrived in 1972, Maryland had suffered through seven straight losing seasons. In his second year, Claiborne engineered a turnaround, and from 1973 to 1978, he led Maryland to six consecutive bowl games and three consecutive ACC championships. After losing the 1977 Cotton Bowl Classic to Houston, Maryland narrowly missed an opportunity for the national championship. Claiborne was inducted into the College Football Hall of Fame in 1999.

Since 1982, the University of Maryland Athletic Hall of Fame has enshrined some of the school's greatest athletes. Inductees have included sixty-two football players, three of whom also served as head coach, and two head football coaches who were not alumni of the university. Eleven football lettermen were in the inaugural class, including Harry Clifton "Curley" Byrd, who was a multi-sport athlete, 24-year football coach, athletic director, professor, university president, and politician. Other football players in the 1982 class included Bosey Berger, a Major League Baseball player; Burton Shipley, Maryland's first basketball coach; and Fred Linkous, a Lacrosse Hall of Famer.

=== College Football Hall of Fame ===
Key

Pro Football Hall of Fame inductee ^

For a guide to the abbreviations used, see the glossary.

Inducted	Player	Position	At U-Md.
1980	Bob Ward	G	1948–1951
1983	Jack Scarbath	QB	1950–1952
1993	Dick Modzelewski	T	1950–1952
1996	Bob Pellegrini	C	1953–1955
1994	Randy White^	DT	1972–1974
2000	Stan Jones^	T	1951–1953

Inducted	Coach	At U-Md.
1968	Clark Shaughnessy	1942, 1946
1984	Jim Tatum	1947–1955
1986	Bear Bryant	1945
1999	Jerry Claiborne	1972–1981

=== University of Maryland Athletic Hall of Fame ===
Inducted	Player	Position	Graduated
1982	Bosey Berger	B/E	1932
1982	Joseph C. Burger	T	1925
1982	Curley Byrd	B/E, HC	1908
1982	Geary F. Eppley	E, AD	1921
1982	Bill Guckeyson	B	1936
1982	Fred Linkous	B	1928
1982	Charles L. Mackert	B/C/T	1921
1982	Jim Meade	B	1939
1982	Julius J. Radice	B	1930
1982	Burton Shipley	B	1914
1982	Bill Supplee	E	1926
1983	George V. Chalmers	B	1932
1983	William W. Evans	B	1930
1983	Norwood Sothoron	B	1935
1984	Caleb Bailey	C	1922
1984	Brooke Brewer	B	1922
1984	Joseph H. Deckman	—	1931
1984	Charles F. Ellinger	B	1937
1984	Al Heagy	E	1930
1984	Frederick M. Hewitt	B	1936
1984	William G. Morris	—	1913
1984	John C. Norris	E	1932
1984	Jack Scarbath	QB	1952
1984	Gerald Snyder	B	1929
1984	Jim Tatum	HC	N/A
1984	Bob Ward	G, HC	1952
1984	Albert W. Woods	E	1933
1985	John F. Hough	G	1925
1985	Thomas J. McQuade	B	1924
1985	Pershing L. Mondorff	B/K	1941
1985	Kenneth T. Knode	B	1916
1985	Harry Edwin Semler	B	1922

Inducted	Player	Position	Graduated
1986	Francis A. Buscher	E	1934
1986	Jessee J. Krajovic	G	1931
1987	William E. Krouse	T	1941
1987	Tommy Mont	QB, HC	1947
1988	Bernie Faloney	QB	1953
1988	John D. Gilmore	B	1943
1988	Raymond J. Poppelman	QB	1933
1988	Victor G. Willis	E	1937
1990	Charles A. May	B	1931
1990	Edward M. Minion	T	1938
1990	Myron B. Stevens	B	1927
1991	Stan Jones	T	1953
1991	Robert Smith	C	1942
1992	Dick Modzelewski	T	1953
1992	Ray Krouse	T	1950
1994	Chet Hanulak	B	1954
1994	Mike Sandusky	T/G	1957
1995	Tom Brown	B	1962
1995	Randy White	DT	1974
1995	Earl Widmyer	B	1935
1996	Bob Pellegrini	C	1956
1997	Gary Collins	E	1961
1998	Stan Lavine	QB	1950
2000	Jerry Claiborne	HC	N/A
2000	Kevin Glover	C	1985
2000	Dick Shiner	QB	1963
2002	Ed Modzelewski	B	1951
2003	Boomer Esiason	QB	1983
2004	J. D. Maarleveld	OT	1985
2004	Bill Walker	E	1954
2005	Tom Cosgrove	C	1952
2009	Dale Castro	K/P	1981

== Glossary ==
Abbreviations
Positions				Selectors			
B	Back	OG	Offensive guard	AFCA	American Football Coaches Association	FWAA	Football Writers Association of America
C	Center	OT	Offensive tackle	AP	Associated Press	INS	International News Service
DB	Defensive back	P	Punter	CFN	College Football News	NEA	Newspaper Enterprise Association
DL	Defensive lineman	QB	Quarterback	CNN	CNN Sports Illustrated	TSN	The Sporting News
DT	Defensive tackle	RB	Running back	CSW	College Sports Writers	UPI	United Press International
E	End	RS	Return specialist	ESPN	ESPN.com	WCFF	Walter Camp Foundation
FB	Fullback	T	Tackle	FN	Football News		
G	Guard	TE	Tight end				
K	Placekicker	WR	Wide receiver				
LB	Linebacker						
