= Maryland Terrapins football under Jim Tatum =

Era in the mid-20th century history of the Maryland Terrapins

From 1947 to 1955, Jim Tatum served as the head coach of the Maryland Terrapins football team, which represented the University of Maryland in National Collegiate Athletic Association (NCAA) college football. Maryland hired Tatum to replace Clark Shaughnessy after the 1946 season. Tatum had created both success and controversy during his one season as head coach of the Oklahoma Sooners football team. During his nine-year tenure, Tatum became one of the most successful head football coaches in Maryland history, and the Terrapins compiled two national championships, three conference championships, and five bowl game appearances. His teams compiled a 73–15–4 record without a single losing season, and as of the end of 2016, he has the highest winning percentage of any Maryland football coach who coached at least seven games. In 1954, the University of Maryland appointed a new president, Dr. Wilson Elkins, who chose to de-emphasize football. Following the 1955 season, Tatum took a pay cut to coach at his alma mater, North Carolina, and he died four years later.

During Tatum's tenure, several Maryland players were awarded prestigious individual honors. Two Maryland quarterbacks were runners-up for the Heisman Trophy, which is awarded to college football's most outstanding player. In 1952, Jack Scarbath was a first runner-up to Oklahoma running back Billy Vessels. In 1953, Bernie Faloney was a third runner-up, with John Lattner of Notre Dame winning the award. Dick Modzelewski won the 1952 Outland Trophy, the annual award given to the nation's most outstanding interior lineman.

Seven Maryland players received first-team All-American honors: Bernie Faloney, Stan Jones, Dick Modzelewski, Bob Pellegrini, Mike Sandusky, Jack Scarbath, and Bob Ward (twice honored). Seven Maryland players received second-team All-American honors: Tom Cosgrove, Chet Hanulak, Ray Krouse, Dick Modzelewski, Ed Modzelewski, Ed Vereb, and Bill Walker (twice honored). Also during this period, the Southern Conference (through 1952) and Atlantic Coast Conference (ACC) (since 1953) bestowed all-conference honors upon Maryland players twenty-seven times. In later years, two of these players were honored as part of the ACC's 50th Anniversary Team and five were inducted into the College Football Hall of Fame.

== Tatum before Maryland ==
Jim Tatum was born in McColl, South Carolina on July 22, 1913. He played football as a left tackle like four of his older brothers. Tatum attended the University of North Carolina where he played for Carl Snavely's Tar Heels and earned All-American honors during his senior year in 1934. The following season, he became Snavely's assistant coach and followed him to Cornell in 1936. Tatum returned to North Carolina in 1940 as an assistant coach under Bear Wolf. In 1942, Tatum was promoted into the head coaching job himself and compiled a 5–2–2 record. The next year, during the Second World War, he enlisted in the United States Navy and served as an assistant coach for the Iowa Pre-Flight School football team under Don Faurot, the inventor of the split-T. Future Oklahoma coach Bud Wilkinson worked as an assistant coach alongside Tatum.

In 1946, with the recommendation of Oklahoma athletic director Jap Haskell, Tatum was hired as the Sooners' head coach and brought Wilkinson as an assistant. Tatum replaced Dewey Luster, who resigned due to ill health. Luster had struggled in the position as the Second World War put a continuous and heavy drain on athletes at the University of Oklahoma. The final game before Luster's resignation was a 0–47 loss at the hands of Oklahoma A&M, which rounded out Oklahoma's 1945 season with a 5–5 record.

In Tatum's one season at Oklahoma, he led the Sooners to an 8–3 finish and a share of the Big Six Conference championship. Tatum and his staff also recruited nine players who became All-Americans: Plato Andros, Buddy Burris, Jack Mitchell, Jim Owens, John Rapacz, Darrell Royal, George Thomas, Wade Walker, and Stan West.

In addition to his team's success on the gridiron, Tatum caused controversy. Buddy Burris, the first three-time All-American at Oklahoma, said, "Jim Tatum was a con-man, a dictator, a tyrant, and one hell of a football coach." Tatum greatly surpassed his allocated budget and linked players with sponsors who sometimes paid or bought clothes for their sponsored players. After a 34–13 Gator Bowl victory over N.C. State, University of Oklahoma president George Cross discovered that Tatum had paid the fifty Sooners players $120 each ($1,981, adjusted for inflation). Cross had explicitly warned Tatum not to do so, as it was a violation of conference rules. With further investigation, it was discovered that $60,000 ($990,614 in inflation-adjusted terms) was unaccounted for in the athletic department budget, which resulted in the relief of athletic director Jap Haskell.

Meanwhile, Tatum resigned to take the head coaching job at Maryland with a $12,000 salary, one-third more than he made at Oklahoma, ($173,025, adjusted for inflation). Oklahoma filled the open coaching job with Tatum's former assistant, Bud Wilkinson.

== The 1947 season ==
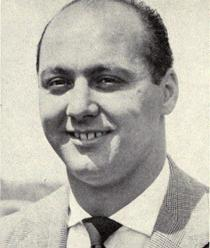
Lu Gambino, who had limited playing time under Shaughnessy, proved a star during the 1947 season.

In Tatum's initial season at Maryland, his results were similar to those at Oklahoma. After compiling a 3–6 record the year prior, the Terrapins improved to 7–2–2 under Tatum. Whereas his predecessor Clark Shaughnessy had pioneered the T-formation, Tatum installed the split-T offense that his former colleague Don Farout had invented. The team's two losses came at the hands of two ranked period powerhouses, Duke and North Carolina. Maryland's star running back, Lu Gambino, scored three touchdowns against West Virginia to lead the team to their first victory in the third meeting of the series. The Terrapins' regular-season play earned them a berth in their first postseason game.

=== 1948 Gator Bowl ===
Maryland met Georgia in the 1948 Gator Bowl. The Terrapins scored first when Gambino broke a 35-yard run for a touchdown in the second quarter. On the first series of the second half, Georgia quarterback John Rauch led an 87-yard drive capped by a one-yard dive into the end zone. Maryland responded with an 80-yard drive for another score by Gambino. Georgia turned the ball over with a fumble on its own 40-yard line and Maryland capitalized with a 24-yard touchdown pass to Gambino. In the final quarter, Georgia came from behind with a one-yard touchdown rush by Joe Geri and a nine-yard touchdown pass to John Donaldson. Georgia missed the extra point and the final result was a 20–20 tie. Gambino recorded all three Maryland touchdowns and 165 rushing yards, which set a school bowl-game record that stood for 60 years until broken by Da'Rel Scott in the 2008 Humanitarian Bowl.

=== Effects ===
Gambino finished the year as the NCAA scoring leader with 96 points. He was inducted into the Gator Bowl Hall of Fame in 1992 for his achievement as the bowl game's "first superb running back." Lu Gambino received All-Southern Conference honors.

== The 1948 season ==
The 1948 season saw Maryland slide to a 6–4 record, but they delivered four shutouts and lost two of their games by a combined three points. Two of their four losses came against ranked conference opponents, and a third was a 34-point shutout at the hands of Vanderbilt. Future two-time Heisman runner-up Charlie Justice helped North Carolina to a 29-point romp over the Terrapins.

== The 1949 season ==
Maryland improved to 9–1 in 1949 to earn their second bowl appearance. Their lone loss came against a ranked Michigan State team and Maryland allowed no opponent to score more than 14 points. They recorded victories over two ranked teams: Boston U. and Missouri under Tatum's former boss, Don Faurot. Maryland finished the regular season with a final AP ranking of 14th. The Terrapins again traveled to the Gator Bowl for their finale, and they defeated 20th-ranked Missouri. Ray Krouse was named All-Southern Conference and an AP second-team All-American.

== The 1950 season ==
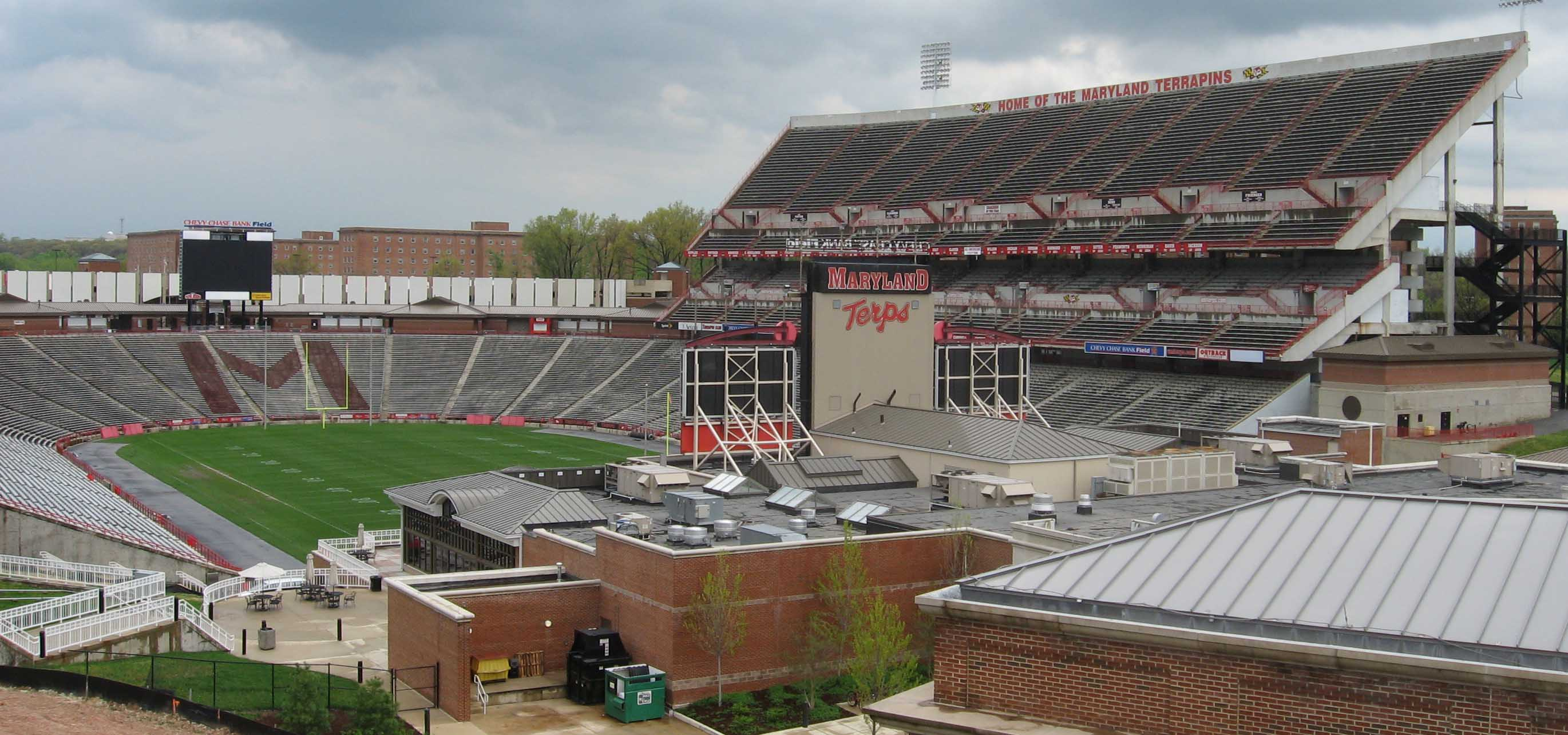
Byrd Stadium (pictured here with the upper deck, a modern addition) was completed in time for the 1950 season.

The Terrapins started off as the 15th-ranked team in the preseason AP Poll. At Georgia, Maryland lost its season-opener, 7–27. Tatum said, "We weren't ready for Georgia in a game as early as September 23 ... We weren't in shape and the [92 °F (33 °C)] heat killed us." The loss, however, did not affect Maryland's poll ranking as the situation surrounding the game was generally understood.

In Week 2, the Terrapins played the inaugural game at the newly completed Byrd Stadium. It was the first game against the Naval Academy in 16 years. The series had been canceled in 1934 after Maryland accused Navy of an illegal game-winning play. In 1950, Maryland agreed to fill a vacancy in the Navy schedule left open by a Georgetown cancellation. The high-scoring game was the 12th meeting of the intense in-state rivalry and resulted in just the second-ever Maryland win.

After upsetting second-ranked Michigan State, 34–7, Maryland climbed to an AP Poll ranking of eighth in the nation and then defeated Georgetown. The following game they met N.C. State at Byrd Stadium for Homecoming weekend. In the first quarter, a Maryland fumble rolled out of the end zone for a safety, and soon after, another fumble set up a touchdown rush by NC State. Maryland advanced inside the N.C. State five-yard line three times but was unable to score. In the third quarter, NC State scored again to expand their lead, 0–16. Maryland scored on a 21-yard pass from Jack Scarbath to Bob Shemonski. With three minutes remaining, Shemonski connected with a pass to Pete Augsburger for another touchdown. A 47-yard drive into Wolfpack territory ended with an interception in the end zone with seconds remaining. The loss effectively ended the Terrapins' hopes for a bowl game bid. The second loss dropped them out of the AP Poll for the remainder of the year.

Bob Ward was named a first-team All-American. Ward and Elmer Wingate were named All-Southern Conference.

== The 1951 season ==
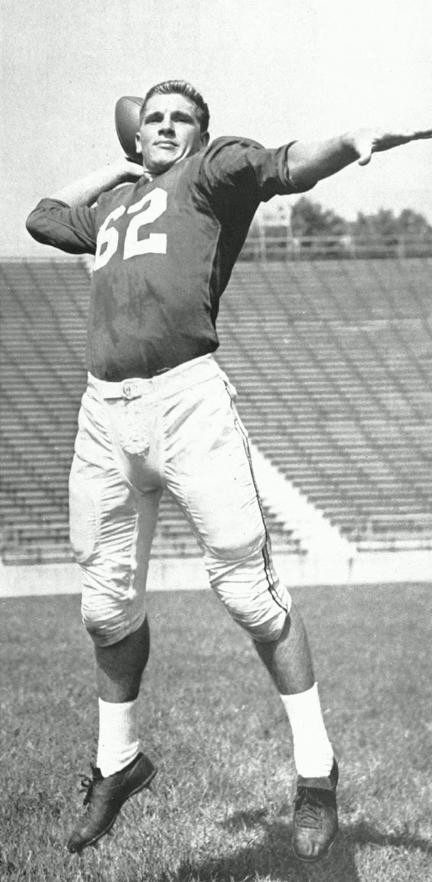
Quarterback Jack Scarbath helped engineer Maryland's undefeated 1951 season.

Over the course of the season, Maryland outscored its opponents 381–74, accumulated three shutout wins, and held seven opponents to 7 points or less. It was Maryland's first 10-win season and remains the team's only perfect undefeated season in the modern era. (Note: This usage of "modern era" is used to differentiate from Maryland's only other perfect season in 1893.)

Maryland entered the season at number-16 on the AP and Coaches' polls, and remained ranked for the duration. A 40-point trouncing of conference foe George Washington in the season-opener propelled the Terrapins to a number-nine ranking in both polls. Other wins included games against Southeastern Conference powerhouses: a romp over Georgia and a shutout against LSU. Before the Georgia game, Tatum showed his team that Georgia had charged only $5 for tickets, instead of the usual $7.50 ($62 instead of $93, adjusted for inflation). Tatum said, "They don't think very much of you, do they?"

The Terrapins finished the regular season with a 9–0 record and the Southern Conference championship. They achieved a final ranking as the number-three team in the nation. (Note: At the time, both the AP Poll and Coaches' Poll published their final rankings, and declared the national champions, before the postseason bowl games.) They secured a berth in the Sugar Bowl to face the number-one team in the nation, undefeated Tennessee led by head coach "General" Robert Neyland.

=== 1952 Sugar Bowl ===
The Washington Post called the 1952 Sugar Bowl the second "game of the century", with the first having been between the undefeated Army and Notre Dame teams in 1946. Maryland was viewed as an underdog against Tennessee, which included five All-Americans on its roster. The Volunteers were led by Heisman runner-up quarterback Hank Lauricella, and Neyland's offensive linemen were described as not large but "squatty" and "bruiser[s], not flashy, but slightly murderous." Neyland considered the split-T offense used by Tatum gimmicky and relied on the more traditional single-wing formation. For the game, Tatum himself abandoned the split-T in favor of a smashmouth strategy, which he hoped would catch Tennessee off-guard. Neyland's strategy focused heavily on punting the ball to pin the opponent in their own territory with a goal of creating turnovers, and Tatum likewise adopted it.

The game started with both teams exchanging several punts in the first quarter. Maryland gained good field position after Lauricella kicked a short punt. Running backs Ed Modzelewski and Ed Fullerton then led an 11-play, 56-yard rushing drive for a touchdown. On the kickoff, Bob Ward hit Lauricella and forced a fumble that Maryland recovered on Tennessee's 13-yard line. After four plays, Jack Scarbath pitched to Fullerton who then threw a six-yard forward pass to Bob Shemonski in the end zone and expanded the Maryland lead to 14–0. Scarbath then engineered a 48-yard drive and ran it in himself for the Terrapins' third touchdown within seven minutes. Late in the second quarter, Tennessee back Bert Rechichar caught a four-yard pass for a touchdown, but the extra point was no good. At the end of the first half, Maryland had stunned Tennessee by gaining a 21–6 lead. In the fourth quarter, Fullerton intercepted a pass and returned it 46 yards for a touchdown. In the final minutes, Tennessee's goal-line quarterback Herky Payne ran it in from the one-yard line. Maryland won the game with a final result of 28–13.

=== Effects ===
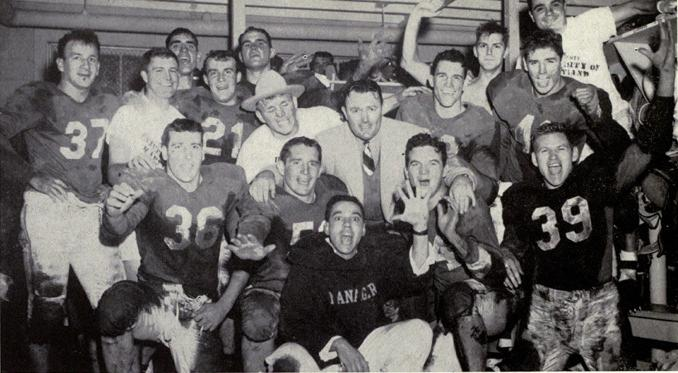
Maryland players celebrate their victory over No. 1 Tennessee.

With the final polls already closed before the bowl season, Tennessee retained possession of the national championship. In following years, however, several selectors have named Maryland as the retroactive 1951 national champions: Jeff Sagarin, the College Football Researchers Association, DeVold System, Dunkel System, and National Championship Foundation.

=== Awards ===
Jim Tatum was named the Southern Conference Coach of the Year. Bob Ward received the Knute Rockne Award and was named the Southern Conference Player of the Year. Bob Ward was named a consensus first-team All-American and Dick Modzelewski and Ed Modzelewski were named second-team All-Americans. Ward and Ed Modzelewski were named All-Southern Conference.

== The 1952 season ==
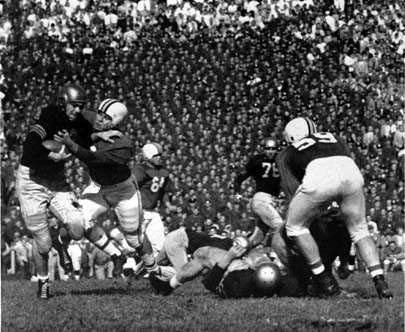
Maryland routed No. 20 Navy, 38–7, in 1952.

Maryland was sanctioned for violating a Southern Conference rule, passed halfway through the 1951 season, that banned postseason play. The punishment, for participating in the Sugar Bowl, disallowed the Terrapins from playing any conference games during the 1952 season. This compelled Maryland to schedule all but three games on the road.

The AP preseason poll ranked Maryland second in the nation. The Terrapins recorded a 37-point shutout of 19th-ranked Georgia and defeated 20th-ranked Navy, 38–7. Maryland finished the season with a No. 13 final ranking. Their loss at Mississippi ended a 22-game winning streak for the Terrapins. Tatum blamed the Terrapins' late season slide to injuries suffered by star quarterback Scarbath and weariness from the grueling road schedule.

=== Effects ===
After the season, disaffection within the Southern Conference prompted seven former members, including Maryland, to form the Atlantic Coast Conference (ACC). The schism was due in part to the ban on bowl participation, and the vast geographic dispersion of and disparity between the sizes of member schools. Clemson, another founding ACC member, had likewise been forced to play outside the Southern Conference in 1952.

Tatum considered resigning in order to enter business. University president Byrd, a staunch patron of football at the school, was preparing to campaign for governor, and Tatum feared his successor would significantly reduce the number of athletic scholarships available. He and Byrd, however, had also disagreed over the decision to participate in bowl games in violation of conference rules. Tatum was opposed to it, as it greatly increased the difficulty of scheduling and had caused the reduction in number of home games.

=== Awards ===
In 1952, Maryland quarterback Jack Scarbath was runner-up for the Heisman Trophy, which is awarded to college football's most outstanding player. Scarbath received 367 points, coming behind to Oklahoma running back Billy Vessels, who received 525 points. Scarbath also was named the Southern Conference Player of the Year. Dick Modzelewski was awarded the Outland Trophy and the Knute Rockne Award. Scarbath and Dick Modzelewski were also both named consensus first-team All-Americans. Tom Cosgrove was named a second-team All-American. Stan Jones and Scarbath were named All-Southern Conference. The Associated Press All-South team, which consisted of players from fifteen schools in the Southern U.S., included Scarbath, and honorable mentions end John Alderton, tackle Dick Modzelewski, and back Ed Fullerton.

== The 1953 season ==
During this season, Maryland outscored its opponents 298–38, accumulated six shutout wins, and allowed only one team, Georgia, to score more than 7 points. No ACC team scored more total points until 1967 and none has ever allowed fewer points in the regular season (31). Maryland ranked first nationally in terms of rushing defense (83.9 yards allowed per game) and scoring defense (3.1 points allowed per game). At the end of the regular season, the three wire services, the Associated Press, International News Service, and United Press, each named Maryland as the national championship team.

Maryland entered the season ranked ninth in the preseason AP Poll. In the season opener against Missouri, Chet Hanulak scored in the first two minutes of play on a 61-yard run. Maryland intercepted four passes while sacrificing three fumbles in the 20–7 win.

Against Washington and Lee, Hanulak made an interception and then on Maryland's possession rushed for a 12-yard touchdown. Ron Waller dropped a Generals' punt at mid-field, but recovered and returned it for a touchdown. After halftime, Tatum fielded third- and fourth-string players before the final results of 52–0.

At Clemson, quarterback Bernie Faloney returned the opening kick off 88 yards for a touchdown. In the second quarter, Clemson quarterback Don King was sacked by several Maryland defenders and suffered a game-ending knee injury. With 45 seconds left in the half, Dick Nolan scored on a 90-yard punt return. In the second half, Faloney connected with Nolan for a 65-yard touchdown pass. Clemson finished the game with two pass completions and suffered its first shutout at home in 11 years, 20–0.

Against Georgia, most critics thought Maryland faced its first true test. In the first quarter, the Terrapins took a quick 14–0 lead and held the Bulldogs to six offensive plays, two of which were punts. In the second quarter, Georgia quarterback Zeke Bratkowski led his team to two consecutive touchdown drives, and the score was 21–13 in favor of Maryland at halftime. Two minutes into the third quarter, Faloney intercepted a Bratkowski pass and returned it for a touchdown. Bratkowski was taken out of the game after numerous sacks by Stan Jones and Bob Morgan. The 40–13 final result would be the most points the Terrapins allowed during the entire season.

At North Carolina, the undefeated Terrapins met the undefeated Tar Heels. Two 15-yard penalties against North Carolina set up a quarterback sneak by Faloney for a touchdown. In the second quarter, Bill Walker caught a pitch at the Maryland 35 and ran it 49 yards to the North Carolina 16-yard line. From there, Charlie Boxold scored another touchdown for the Terrapins. In the third quarter, Hanulak took a pitch and took it 34 yards into the end zone. The 26–0 win was the Maryland's first in Chapel Hill, North Carolina since 1924. Tatum later called it "the greatest win of any team I ever coached, including the [1952] Sugar Bowl [over national champion Tennessee]."

At Miami, Hanulak scored first on a two-yard rush. Morgan recovered a Miami fumble and on the ensuing possession Faloney scored on an eight-yard rush. By halftime, Maryland led 27–0. Tatum disallowed any passes or trick plays in the second half, and the final result was 30–0.

Maryland next traveled to South Carolina to face a team coming off of a four-game winning streak. Ralph Felton scored first to cap a long drive with a short rush. In the next series, the Gamecocks punted it away and the ball was returned by Hanulak 35 yards for a touchdown. In the second quarter, South Carolina recovered a Maryland fumble on the Terrapins' 14-yard line. In three plays, Maryland had pushed them back to the 32-yard line before South Carolina finally scored. With South Carolina held to 37 rushing yards the final result was 24–6.

After defeating George Washington 27–6, the Terrapins went on to shut out two ranked teams: 11th-ranked Mississippi and 11th-ranked Alabama. Maryland secured a share of the ACC championship alongside Duke and a berth in the Orange Bowl as the only undefeated and untied team in the nation. Maryland finished the regular season 10–0 and were crowned the national champions.

=== 1954 Orange Bowl ===
In Miami, first-ranked Maryland faced the team Tatum had coached prior to his arrival at College Park: fourth-ranked Oklahoma under former assistant Bud Wilkinson. The Sooners handed Maryland their only defeat, 0–7, but—as had happened in 1951 to the Terrapins' detriment—the final rankings were released before the bowls, and for the third time in four years, AP's national champion was defeated in their postseason game. However, unlike Tennessee, who retained their top-rank despite losing to Maryland in 1951, the Terrapins (10–1–0) did indeed finish with the best record, better than the Orange Bowl victor, Oklahoma (9–1–1). Maryland ranked first nationally in terms of rushing defense (83.9 yards allowed per game) and scoring defense (3.1 points allowed per game). At the same time, the Terps scored a record combined total of 298 points, a number not exceeded until 1967.

=== Awards ===
Like the year prior, in 1953, a Maryland quarterback, Bernie Faloney, was in contention for the Heisman Trophy. Faloney finished fourth in the running and received 258 points, behind Notre Dame's John Lattner (1,850), Minnesota's Paul Giel (1,794), and UCLA's Paul Cameron (444). Stan Jones was selected as a consensus first-team All-American. Bernie Faloney was also named a first-team All-American. Chet Hanulak was named a second-team All-American. Four Terrapins were named to the All-ACC first-team: John Bowersox, Bernie Faloney, Chester Hanulak, and Stan Jones. Three were named to the All-ACC second-team: Ralph Felton, Bob Morgan, and Bill Walker.

== The 1954 season ==
On Thanksgiving Day, Tatum coached Maryland to a pummeling, 74–13, of his former boss Don Faurot's Missouri, and the Terrapins set an ACC record-high for scoring that stood for 27 years. Maryland finished the season with a 7–2–1 record and was named the eighth-ranked team by AP. Bill Walker was selected by AP as a second-team All-American. Three Maryland players were named to the All-ACC first team: Dick Bielski, Bill Walker, and Ronnie Waller. Two were named to the All-ACC second team: John Irvine and Bob Pellegrini.

== The 1955 season ==
In Tatum's final season in College Park, Maryland spent four weeks as the first-ranked team in the AP Poll and ten weeks ranked in the top three. No opponent managed more than 13 points during the regular season. Maryland again had the first-ranked rushing defense in the nation, allowing 83.9 yards per game. Frank Tamburello became the starting quarterback, and entered the season with significant game experience from the prior year as a reserve behind Charlie Boxold. Fullback Tom Selep missed the season due to a knee injury.

The opener against Missouri was a much closer contest than the previous year's record-setting game. Ed Vereb rushed for a 14-yard touchdown and Tamburello passed for another, but only failed extra-point attempts by Missouri in the second half preserved victory, 13–12.

In week two, Maryland met first-ranked UCLA for the second half of a home-and-home series in a game dubbed "The Best of the East vs. the Best of the West." It was a rain-soaked defensive contest at Byrd Stadium, where Maryland held UCLA's rushing attack to −21 yards. UCLA quarterback Ronnie Knox completed 10 of 15 passes for 100 yards but also threw two interceptions. Late in the first quarter, Knox's passing brought the Bruins to the Maryland three-yard line. On the next play, UCLA advanced to the one-foot line before Bob Pellegrini tackled second-string fullback Doug Peters to force a fumble. Maryland made the only score when, in the third quarter, quarterback Frank Tamburello executed an option run and pitched to halfback Ed Vereb, who ran it 15 yards into the end zone. With the victory, the Terrapins became the first-ranked team.

The following week, Maryland beat 20th-ranked Baylor, 20–6, with Tamburello passing for two touchdowns. Maryland then defeated Wake Forest, 28–7, and held them to nine rushing yards. Against North Carolina, they allowed 18 yards on the ground. Vereb scored three touchdowns and made an interception, but the Tar Heels scored under unusual circumstances when center Jim Jones stripped Tamburello and returned it 35 yards. The final result was 25–7.

Syracuse scored the most points of any regular season opponent with touchdowns by Jim Brown and Don Althouse, but Maryland's offense scored a season high and won, 34–13. The Terrapins shutout a mediocre South Carolina, 27–0, and Louisiana State, 13–0, against whom they made four interceptions including one in the end zone by Phil Perlo. Clemson took the lead early with a Don King touchdown pass to Dalton Rivers and Joel Wells breaking away for another score soon after. Maryland's reserve quarterback, Lynn Beightol, threw to Ed Vereb for two touchdowns, and in the second half, Clemson was allowed only 22 yards. Maryland won, 25–12. Maryland posted a fourth shutout against George Washington, 19–0. Vereb scored two touchdowns, which tied Lu Gambino's single-season school record of 16.

The Terrapins, with a perfect ACC record, were named conference co-champions alongside Duke for the second consecutive year. Maryland possessed a perfect regular season record and ranked third in the nation behind Michigan State (8–1). The Terps secured an Orange Bowl rematch against first-ranked Oklahoma and a chance to avenge their defeat in 1953. However, the Sooners beat them again, 20–6, and they finished the postseason with a 10–1 record.

=== Awards ===
Bob Pellegrini was named a consensus first-team All-American, the National Lineman of the Year, and the ACC Player of the Year. Mike Sandusky was also named a first-team All-American. Ed Vereb and Bill Walker were named second-team All-Americans. Four Maryland players were named to the All-ACC first-team: Jack Davis, Bob Pellegrini, Mike Sandusky, and Ed Vereb. Three were named to the All-ACC second-team: Russell Dennis, Frank Tamburello, and Bill Walker.

== Tatum's departure ==
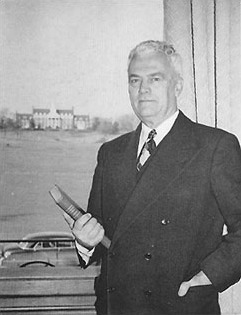
H. C. "Curley" Byrd served as Maryland president during most of Tatum's tenure.

In 1954, Curley Byrd resigned as university president in order to enter state politics, and was replaced by Dr. Wilson Elkins, a Rhodes scholar and former Texas quarterback. Elkins worked to improve academic standards at the school, which had been criticized for overemphasizing football. One year during Tatum's tenure, the school awarded 93 football scholarships averaging $944 each ($11,317 adjusted for inflation). The Diamondback student newspaper said that, while Tatum was at Maryland, it "was an era in which an inadequate stadium became ultra-adequate, and an inadequate library became more inadequate."

During his tenure at Maryland, Tatum became one of the most successful head football coaches in school history. In nine seasons, he led the Terrapins to two national championships, three conference championships, and five bowl game appearances. His teams compiled a 73–15–4 record without a single losing season. To date, he remains the winningest Maryland football coach of the modern era with a winning percentage of 0.819.

After the 1955 season, Tatum took an 18% pay cut, from $18,500 to $15,000 (from $222,345 to $180,280 in inflation-adjusted terms), to return to North Carolina as head coach. There, The Daily Tar Heel student newspaper was displeased to see Tatum arrive and called him a "parasitic monster of open professionalism." After a few years, however, he was accepted by the student body, the faculty, and alumni. Tatum had said, "I'm going back to North Carolina to die," and the statement proved prescient. Just four years later, in 1959, he died of Rocky Mountain spotted fever at the age of 46.

== See also ==
- List of Maryland Terrapins football seasons
