= Bob Ward (American football, born 1927) =

American football player and coach (1927–2005)

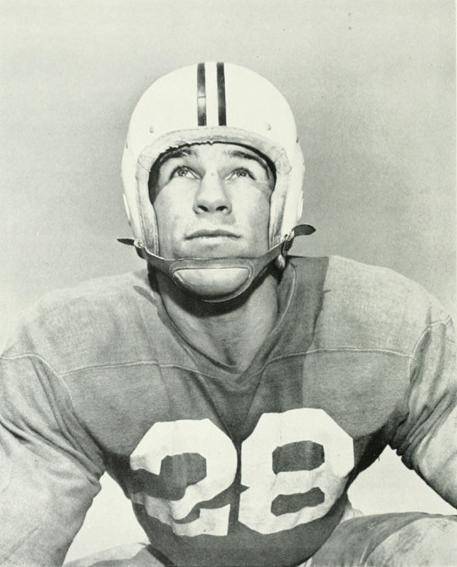
- Ward in 1951

Biographical details
- Born: September 16, 1927; Elizabeth, New Jersey, U.S.
- Died: April 29, 2005 (aged 77); Laytonsville, Maryland, U.S.

Playing career
- 1948–1951: Maryland
- Position: Guard

Coaching career (HC unless noted)
- 1952–1957: Maryland (assistant)
- 1957–1958: Oklahoma (assistant)
- 1958–1965: Iowa State (assistant)
- 1966: Army (Defensive Coordinator)
- 1967–1968: Maryland
- 1969: Ottawa Rough Riders (assistant)
- 1970–1971: Montreal Alouettes (assistant)
- 1975–1976: Toronto Argonauts (OL)

Head coaching record
- Overall: 2–17

Accomplishments and honors

Awards
- Unanimous All-American (1951); First-team All-American (1950); SoCon Player of the Year (1951); 2× First-team All-SoCon (1950, 1951); Second-team All-SoCon (1949); Touchdown Club Lineman of the Year (1951); Philadelphia Sports Writers Lineman of the Year (1951); Gator Bowl MVP (1950); 4× Maryland MVP (1948–1951); Maryland jersey No. 28 retired
- College Football Hall of Fame; Inducted in 1980 (profile)

Robert Richard Ward (September 16, 1927 – April 29, 2005) was an American gridiron football coach and player. He played college football for the Terrapins at the University of Maryland. He is considered, alongside Randy White, as one of the greatest linemen to have ever played for Maryland. Ward is the only player to have been named an Associated Press first-team All-American for both an offensive and defensive position.

In 1950, Ward was named a first-team All-American, and the following year, he received consensus first-team honors. He served as the Maryland head football coach from 1967 to 1968, but without success. He coached football for a total of 22 years, including assistant coaching positions at Oklahoma, Iowa State, and Army, and in the Canadian Football League. Ward was inducted into the College Football Hall of Fame as a player in 1980.

== Early life ==
Bob Ward was born in Elizabeth, New Jersey on September 16, 1927. He attended Thomas Jefferson High School. During the Second World War, Ward enlisted in the United States Army. He completed Airborne School to become a paratrooper and was stationed at Fort Benning, Georgia. He later served as a first lieutenant in the United States Air Force.

== College career ==
In 1948, Ward enrolled at the University of Maryland and played varsity football all four years as both an offensive guard and defensive lineman. At 5 feet 9 inches (1.75 meters) and 187 pounds (85 kg), Ward was undersized for a lineman by the standards of the day (and would be significantly undersized compared with current linemen), but was known for "consistently dominat[ing]" much larger players. His relatively small stature earned him the nickname of the "watch-charm guard." Ward was known for his aggressiveness and tenacity, traits he used to compensate for being out-sized by opposing linemen. Maryland quarterback and 1952 Heisman Trophy runner-up, Jack Scarbath, later said about Ward:

"I remember a game against Michigan State when Bobby [Ward] was at middle guard and went right over top of the center to make a tackle. Then he went right under the center to make another tackle. A little later, he went around the center to the left. Then he went around him to the right. I've never seen anybody who could dominate a game like Bobby."

During Ward's four years at Maryland, the Terrapins achieved a 32–7–1 record, won two bowl games, and secured a national championship. In the 1950 Gator Bowl, Ward was named the game's Most Valuable Player. In the 1952 Sugar Bowl, what The Washington Post called the second "game of the century", Ward was part of the third-ranked Maryland team that defeated coach Robert Neyland's first-ranked Tennessee team, 28–13. That performance capped a perfect 10–0 season for the Terrapins. During that final game of his career, Ward tackled Tennessee offensive back Hank Lauricella and forced a fumble, upon which Maryland capitalized with a touchdown. Ward graduated from the University of Maryland in 1951 with a bachelor's degree in business.

In the 1952 College All-Star Game, Ward captained the college team against the reigning National Football League (NFL) champions, the Los Angeles Rams, but the professionals won, 10–7. Ward declined a professional playing career himself, and turned down contract offers from the Baltimore Colts and a 24th-round NFL draft selection by the Dallas Texans.

=== Awards and praise ===
Ward was named an Associated Press (AP) first-team All-American as a defensive middle guard in 1950 and as an offensive guard in 1951. He is the only player to have ever achieved the honor for both an offensive and defensive position. In 1950, legendary sportswriter Grantland Rice named Ward a Look magazine All-American, and every team that Maryland had played selected Ward to the Chicago Tribune's All-Players All-America team. He was also named to the 1950 All-Southern Conference team.

In 1951, Ward was a consensus All-American as selected by the Associated Press, United Press International, The Sporting News, and the International News Service. He was also named the 1951 Southern Conference Player of the Year, the Washington D.C. Touchdown Club Lineman of the Year, and the Philadelphia Sports Writers Association Lineman of the Year. He was again selected to the All-Southern Conference team in 1951. Ward was voted as Maryland's Most Valuable Player all four years of his playing career and twice received the Anthony C. Nardo Memorial Trophy for the team's most outstanding lineman. His jersey number, 28, was the first to be retired by the University of Maryland.

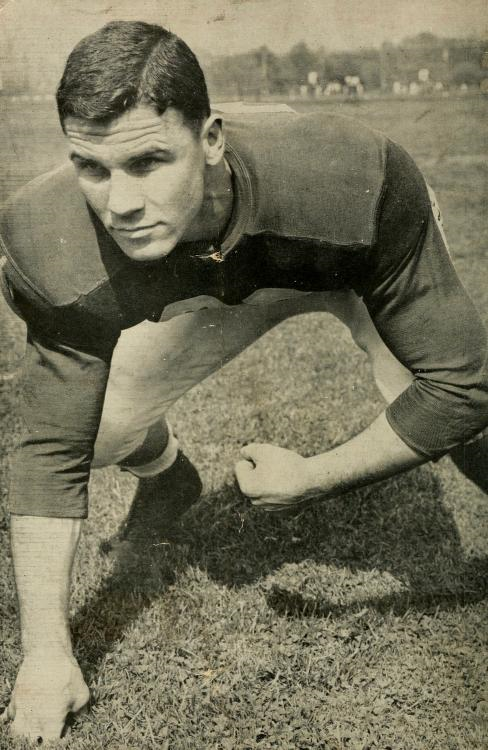
Ward in 1950

Maryland head coach Jim Tatum, who had previously coached eight first-team All-Americans at Oklahoma and coached six aside from Ward at Maryland, said that Ward was "the greatest football player I've seen ounce-for-ounce, and the best I've ever coached." Quarterback Jack Scarbath considered Ward one of Maryland's best all-time linemen alongside Randy White. Teammate and first-round NFL Draft pick Ed Modzelewski said, "I still believe he was the greatest player, pound for pound, that I have seen in either pro or college ball." Ward was inducted into the College Football Hall of Fame in 1980, and into the University of Maryland Athletic Hall of Fame in 1984.

== Coaching career ==
After he declined offers to pursue a professional playing career, Ward coached the game for 22 years. Most of that time was spent as an assistant coach, and he served in that capacity at Maryland from 1952 to 1957, Oklahoma from 1957 to 1958, Iowa State from 1958 to 1965, and Army in 1966. At the United States Military Academy, Ward enjoyed the strictly regimented environment, and the players appreciated his aggressiveness. Ward was Defensive Coordinator.

In 1967, Ward returned to his alma mater to take the head coaching position. Before the season, 12 players failed to academically qualify to play on the team. During that first season, the team lost all nine of their games for the first time in the modern era. Ward's second year saw slight improvement, recording eight losses but with wins over North Carolina and South Carolina. However, many of his players were growing increasingly disgruntled with his coaching style.

In March 1969, Maryland athletic director Jim Kehoe called a meeting among 120 players, Ward, his assistants, and a three-man committee. Thirty-one players told Ward that they no longer wished to play on the team and accused him of using intimidation tactics that included verbal and physical abuse. Ward listened to the player's grievances, but did not respond at the time. Two days later, he resigned as head coach. Later that year, Sports Illustrated interviewed Ward, and he said:

"I won't go into all the specifics, but it wasn't the good players who started it. It was the guys who couldn't fight their way out of a paper bag, guys who sat on the bench and couldn't take it and a couple of pip-squeak cub newspaper guys who don't know what football's all about ... He gets on the campus newspaper and all of a sudden he's got power he never thought of having."

The Diamondback, the university's student newspaper, had criticized Ward for moving the team into one dormitory, which forced some other students out. Ward stated that the move was done on the advice of Kehoe—which Kehoe denied—and with the intent of focusing the players on their studies and building camaraderie. Ward and his assistants monitored the players' academic performance, enforced class attendance, and placed curfews on perceived troublemakers. Ward stated that, in his first year, only two of his players failed out of the school that he claimed had a history of poor athlete academics. He complained that he was a scapegoat and that there had been poor communication between him and Kehoe. Penn State head coach Joe Paterno was concerned with the situation surrounding Ward's resignation and sent a letter to the American Football Coaches Association demanding an investigation. Paterno said:

"I don't know who's right or wrong, but ... I don't think it's a good thing for a squad to fire a coach. As an association, we ought to know what happened. If a university fired an English professor because his class didn't like the way he was doing things, I know darn well that the American Association of University Professors would want to know what happened."

Maryland head coach Ralph Friedgen played as an offensive guard under Ward, and was one of the players who remained on the team when 40 of his teammates walked off in protest. Long after the events, Friedgen said "he was a tough coach ... If he had addressed some of the players' concerns, I don't know that so many would have left ... One of the things I learned from him was to surround myself with good assistants, and I don't know if he necessarily did that." Kehoe, who had been one of Ward's track coaches in college, said, "I think Bob's problem was that he expected his players to play and hustle the same way he had, and times had changed." After Maryland, Ward took a job as an assistant coach with the Ottawa Rough Riders of the Canadian Football League in 1969, and later coached for the Montreal Alouettes, from 1970 to 1971, and the Toronto Argonauts from 1975 to 1976. He remained in Canada for the remainder of his coaching career.

== Later life ==
After his Canadian coaching stint, Ward and his wife, Miss Ellen, opened a liquor store, Manhattan Liquors, located on the City Dock in Annapolis, Maryland, which they operated from 1970 to 1988. They had three sons, James; Robert, Jr.; and Kelly; and one daughter, Kathleen. Kelly Ward attended Iowa State University where he was a three-time All-American wrestler and the national champion in his weight class in 1979. Bob Ward died in one of his sons' homes in Laytonsville, Maryland on April 29, 2005, at the age of 77, due to complications related to Alzheimer's disease. His remains were interred at the Arlington National Cemetery.

== Head coaching record ==
| Year | Team | Overall | Conference | Standing |
|---|---|---|---|---|
Maryland Terrapins (Atlantic Coast Conference) (1967–1968)
| 1967 | Maryland | 0–9 | 0–6 | 8th |
| 1968 | Maryland | 2–8 | 2–5 | 7th |
| Maryland: | | 2–17 | 2–11 | |
| Total: | | 2–17 | | |
