= Ed Fullerton =

American football player and coach (1931–2015)

No. 34
- Positions: Halfback, defensive back

Personal information
- Born: April 7, 1931; Pittsburgh, Pennsylvania, U.S.
- Died: May 28, 2015 (aged 84); Pittsburgh, Pennsylvania, U.S.
- Listed height: 5 ft 10 in (1.78 m)
- Listed weight: 190 lb (86 kg)

Career information
- College: Maryland
- NFL draft: 1953: 4th round, 47th overall pick

Career history
- Pittsburgh Steelers (1953)

Awards and highlights
- First-team All-Southern (1952)
- Stats at Pro Football Reference

Edward Reno Fullerton (April 7, 1931 – May 28, 2015) was an American professional football halfback and defensive back. He was selected in the fourth round of the 1953 NFL draft and played one season in the National Football League (NFL). He played college football for the Maryland Terrapins at the University of Maryland.

== Playing career ==
Fullerton graduated from West View High School in Pittsburgh in 1949. He attended college at the University of Maryland where he played football from 1950 to 1951.

In the 1952 Sugar Bowl, billed by The Washington Post as the second "game of the century", 3rd-ranked Maryland faced "General" Robert Neyland's 1st-ranked Tennessee Volunteers. Fullerton scored the first touchdown of the game by rushing into the end zone to cap a 56-yard drive. Soon after, Maryland quarterback Jack Scarbath pitched to Fullerton who then threw a six-yard pass to Bob Shemonski for another touchdown. In the fourth quarter, Fullerton returned an interception 46 yards for another touchdown. Today, that pick-six is the second-longest return allowed by Tennessee in a bowl game, the first-longest being by another Terrapin, Curome Cox in the 2002 Peach Bowl.

In 1952, Fullerton rushed for a career-high of 107 yards against in-state rival Navy.

He was selected in the fourth round of the 1953 NFL draft by the San Francisco 49ers (46th overall). Fullerton instead went on to play for the Pittsburgh Steelers. He played one game in 1953, but compiled no statistics.

After the NFL, he served in the United States Air Force as a lieutenant for two years in which he played and coached football at Bolling Air Force Base. Upon his discharge from the Air Force in January 1956, he was hired at as an assistant coach his alma mater by Tommy Mont. He served as an assistant coach there from February 1956 to 1958. As of 2001, he was living in his hometown of Pittsburgh.

He died on May 28, 2015, in McCandless, Pennsylvania.
