= 1951 All-Southern Conference football team =

The 1951 All-Southern Conference football team consists of American football players chosen by the Associated Press (AP) and United Press (UP) for the All-Southern Conference football team for the 1951 college football season.

== All-Southern Conference selections ==
=== Backs ===
- Ed Modzelewski, Maryland (AP-1, UP-1)
- Gil Bocetti, Washington & Lee (AP-1, UP-1)
- Ed Mioduszewski, William & Mary (AP-1)
- Steve Wadiak, South Carolina (AP-1)
- Billy Hair, Clemson (AP-2, UP-1)
- John Berry, William & Mary (UP-1)
- Alex Webster, NC State (AP-2)
- Jack Scarbath, Maryland (AP-2)
- Andy Davis, George Washington (AP-2)
- Bino Barreira, George Washington (AP-3)
- Jack Kistler, Duke (AP-3)
- Dickie Lewis, William & Mary (AP-3)
- Red Smith, Duke (AP-3)

=== Ends ===
- Glenn Smith, Clemson (AP-1, UP-1)
- Jack Lewis, Wake Forest (AP-1)
- Neal Petree, VMI (UP-1)
- Bob Thomas, Washington & Lee (AP-2)
- Blaine Earon, Duke (AP-2)
- Jay Grumbling, VMI (AP-3)
- George Norris, North Carolina (AP-3)

=== Tackles ===
- Elmer Costa, North Carolina State (AP-1, UP-1)
- Bill George, Wake Forest (AP-1)
- John Kreamcheck, William & Mary (AP-3, UP-1)
- Dick Modzelewski, Maryland (AP-2)
- Ed Meadow, Duke (AP-2)
- Don Earley, South Carolina (AP-3)

=== Guards ===
- Bob Ward, Maryland (AP-1, UP-1)
- Joe Dudeck, North Carolina (AP-1, UP-1)
- Bill Finnance, Wake Forest (AP-2)
- Frank Continetti, George Washington (AP-2)
- Calvin Hartness, Furman (AP-3)
- Weir Goodwin, VMI (AP-3)

=== Centers ===
- Larry Smith, South Carolina (AP-1, UP-1)
- Lou Tepe, Duke (AP-2)
- Ted Filer, William & Mary (AP-3)

== Key ==
AP = Associated Press

UP = United Press

== See also ==
- 1951 College Football All-America Team
