= 1952 All-Southern Conference football team =

The 1952 All-Southern Conference football team consists of American football players chosen by the United Press (UP) and the International News Service (INS) for the All-Southern Conference football team for the 1952 college football season.

== All-Southern Conference selections ==
=== Backs ===
- Jack Scarbath, Maryland (UP-1; INS-1)
- Ed Mioduszewski, William & Mary (UP-1; INS-1)
- Worth Lutz, Duke (UP-1)
- John Gramling, South Carolina (UP-1)
- Ed Fullerton, Maryland (INS-1)
- Bob Snider, West Virginia (INS-1)
- Jim Ward, Clemson (INS-1)
- Joe Horning, Maryland (INS-1)
- Charles George, Wake Forest (UP-2)
- Charlie Smith, Duke (UP-2)
- Tom Keller, William & Mary (UP-2)
- Jack Kistler, Duke (UP-2)
- Fred Wyant, West Virginia (UP-3)
- Wes Abrams, Washington & Lee (UP-3)
- Larry Spencer, Wake Forest (UP-3)
- Bruce Sturgess, William & Mary (UP-3)

=== Ends ===
- Jack Lewis, Wake Forest (UP-1; INS-1)
- Paul Bischoff, West Virginia (UP-1; INS-1)
- Jim Byron, VMI (INS-1)
- George Alderton, Maryland (INS-1)
- Howard Pitt, Duke (UP-2)
- John LaTorre, South Carolina (UP-2)
- George Norris, Wake Forest (UP-3)

=== Tackles ===
- Ed Meadows, Duke (UP-1; INS-1)
- Don Earley, South Carolina (UP-1)
- Stan Jones, Maryland (INS-1)
- Dick Modzelewski, Maryland (UP-2; INS-1)
- Bob Gaona, Wake Forest (UP-2; INS-1)
- James Lawrence, Duke (UP-3)
- Ken Bridges, Wake Forest (UP-3)

=== Guards ===
- Bob Burrows, Duke (UP-1; INS-1)
- Bill Malezky, Maryland (UP-1)
- Truett Grant, Duke (INS-1)
- Carl Bonin, Duke (INS-1)
- Ken Bridges, Wake Forest (INS-1)
- John Carey, Duke (INS-1)
- Frank Mincevich, South Carolina (UP-2)
- Bill Finnance, Wake Forest (UP-2)
- Clyde Pickard, Wake Forest (UP-3)
- Tom Barton, Clemson (UP-3)

=== Centers ===
- Leon Cunningham, South Carolina (UP-1; INS-1)
- Tom Cosgrove, Maryland (INS-1)
- Lou Tepe, Duke (UP-2)
- Al Pecuch, Richmond (UP-3)

== Key ==
UP = United Press

INS = International News Service

== See also ==
- 1952 College Football All-America Team
