= 1950 Gator Bowl =

American college football game

- 5th Gator Bowl
Missouri Tigers	Maryland Terrapins
(7–3)	(8–1)
Big Seven	SoCon
7	20
Head coach: Don Faurot	Head coach: Jim Tatum
AP 20	AP 14
	1	2	3	4	Total
Missouri	0	0	0	7	7
Maryland	7	13	0	0	20
- Date: January 2, 1950
- Season: 1949
- Stadium: Gator Bowl
- Location: Jacksonville, Florida
- MVP: Bob Ward

The 1950 Gator Bowl was the fifth edition of the Gator Bowl and featured the Missouri Tigers representing the University of Missouri and the Maryland Terrapins representing the University of Maryland. It was the first-ever meeting of the two teams.

Missouri was coached by his former boss, Don Faurot, under whom Tatum had previous been an assistant coach for the U.S. Navy's Iowa Pre-Flight team. Maryland was led by third-year head coach Jim Tatum, who had engineered one season turn-arounds at Maryland and previously Oklahoma. This game was the first in a six-game series between the former colleagues and would last for the remainder of Tatum's tenure at Maryland.

The game was described as a "proving ground" for the split-T formation, which was employed by both teams. Several prominent Southern coaches were in attendance at the game to watch the formation, including Bob Neyland of Tennessee, Wally Butts of Georgia, Frank Howard of Clemson, George Barclay of Washington & Lee, and Tom Nugent of VMI.

== Game summary ==
In the first quarter, Maryland scored on an 11-yard run by Bob Shemonski. Ed Modzelewski rushed for a three-yard touchdown in the second quarter, followed by a six-yard touchdown run by Shemonski again. The extra point kick was unsuccessful, however. In the final quarter, Phil Klein recorded Missouri's only score on a five-yard touchdown run.

== Statistical comparison ==
Missouri recorded 267 yards of total offense, 266 yards of which came on the ground Maryland recorded 282 yards, with 100 rushing and 167 passing yards.. Missouri achieved 13 first downs, compared with Maryland's 11. The Tigers lost five fumbles for five yards while the Terrapins lost two fumbles for one yard

Maryland offensive guard Bob Ward was named the game's Most Valuable Player.
