= Bob Shemonski =

American gridiron football player (1933–2001)

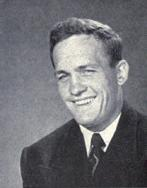
- Shemonski as a senior at Maryland

Profile
- Positions: End, halfback, back

Personal information
- Born: c. 1931; Archbald, Pennsylvania, U.S.
- Died: c. 2001

Career information
- College: Maryland
- NFL draft: 1952: 30th round, 356th overall pick

Awards and highlights
- SoCon season scoring leader (1950)

Bob "Shoo Shoo" Shemonski (c. 1933 – c. 2001) was an American football player. He played college football as an end and back for the Maryland Terrapins and was selected in the 1952 NFL draft by the Chicago Bears.

== Biography ==
A native of Archbald, Pennsylvania, Shemonski was born circa 1933. He attended the University of Maryland and played on the varsity football team under head coach Jim Tatum from 1949 to 1951. During that period, Maryland posted a 26-3-1 record. Shemonski scored five touchdowns in the 1950 game against Virginia Tech, which remains a school record to date. Shemonski remains in the school's top-ten in numerous other categories as well: career and single-game yards per carry; career, single-season, and single-game rushing touchdowns; single-season all-purpose yards; career yards per kick return; single-season punt returns; career and single-season punt return yards; career and single-season yards per punt return; single-season points; career and single-season touchdowns. He earned the nickname "Shoo Shoo", as explained by Maryland guard Bob Ward, "The guy stood right in front of me in the huddle and never said one word the whole time we played together."

In 1949, Tatum's third year, Maryland posted a 9–1 record with a loss only to 13th-ranked Michigan State. In the postseason, Shemonski scored two of the Terps' three touchdowns in the 1950 Gator Bowl win over Missouri. In 1950, Shemonski was the Southern Conference season scoring leader with 97 points. At the time, that was also a new school record and exceeded Lu Gambino's 96 points in 1947. That year, he was the team's leading rusher with 101 carries for 560 yards and kickoff-return leader with ten returns for 259 yards. In 1951, he was again the team kickoff return leader with six returns for 126 yards (a 21.0 yard average). Shemonski played for Maryland in their 1952 Sugar Bowl victory over first-ranked Tennessee. He set the Maryland record for single-game interceptions with three, which was later tied by Tom Brown and Bob Sullivan in 1965. He participated in the 1952 Senior Bowl, alongside fellow Terps Ed Modzelewski and Bob Ward.

The Chicago Bears of the National Football League selected Shemonski in the thirtieth round (356 overall) of the 1952 NFL draft. After two years in the United States Army, he played for the Ottawa Rough Riders as a halfback in 1955. He died prior to 2001.
