= Anthony C. Nardo Memorial Trophy =

University of Maryland football trophy

The Anthony C. Nardo Memorial Trophy was an individual honor awarded by the University of Maryland football team to its most outstanding lineman of the past season.

The award was named in honor of 2LT Anthony C. Nardo, a United States Army officer killed in action in Belgium during the Second World War. Anthony was born to Frank and Carmela Nardo in Baltimore, Maryland and attended the University of Maryland where he played football in 1942, before being commissioned into the Army. Nardo was serving in H Company, 502nd Parachute Infantry Regiment, 101st Airborne Division when he was killed on January 4, 1945. He was posthumously awarded the Purple Heart. His remains are interred at the Luxembourg American Cemetery and Memorial in Luxembourg.

The 1947 Terrapin (College Park's yearbook) notes that the Maryland Alpha chapter of Phi Delta Theta instituted "the George Barnes - Monk Mier Memorial Trophy for a fellow Phi, Tony Nardo, killed in Europe during the war." There is no mention as to the award's recipient for that year.

To date, the earliest news reference to this trophy appears to be an article published in The Baltimore Sun newspaper (then referred to as simply "The Sun") regarding awards for the 1949 season on February 25, 1950. Prior to this date, news articles refer simply to players being voted as the best lineman for the year. The University of Maryland's Men's Football Media Guide gives the earliest award date as being in 1947; however, there are some discrepancies and inconsistencies regarding this trophy's award for years prior to 1950.

While sources disagree on the inaugural season for this trophy's award, they agree that the final award was given for the 1969 season. From 1970 to 1995, it was replaced by the Bob Beall Trophy and Tommy Marcos Trophy.

Originally conceived as a perpetual award with winners' names inscribed from year to year, the nature of the trophy was changed in 1952 after Bob Ward's multiple receipt of this honor. Ward was given the original trophy "for his permanent possession," after being voted this award for the 1951 season. In prior years, the award winner had been given a replica trophy.

== Recipient Discrepancies: 1946-1949 ==
There are discrepancies between the University of Maryland's football media guides and contemporary newspaper articles from the 1950s regarding the Anthony C. Nardo Memorial Trophy.

Lists of recipients for this award first appeared in the media guide in 1962. Prior to 1988, the media guide did not list winners of this award from years prior to 1950. Starting in 1989, the guide has listed Pat McCarthy and Gene Kinney as winners of this award for 1947 and 1948, respectively.

An article appearing in The Sun in January 1948 lends credence to claim for Kinney—but for the 1947 season. While the Anthony C. Nardo Memorial Trophy is not explicitly mentioned, the article notes that Kinney "took honors as best center and lineman." And while the Washington Post notes the annual fete given by the University of Maryland for its athletes in 1947, it makes no special mention of Pat McKinney's performance in the 1946 season nor does it mention an award for him. Finally, the 1948 Terrapin notes that Gene Kinney was, "Awarded Tony Nardo Memorial trophy from Phi Delta Theta as top Terp lineman of season."

In addition, on February 25, 1950, Jesse Linthicum of The Sun observed that, "For the second straight year, Bob Ward was chosen as the outstanding lineman by vote of the [University of Maryland] team." Linthicum further noted that Ward was given the "Anthony J. [sic] Nardo award" for the 1949 football season. This would make Bob Ward the winner in both 1948 (contradicting the media guide) and 1949 as well as 1950 and 1951.

== Recipients ==
The table below reflects the content of the University of Maryland men's football media guide integrated with findings from The Sun. Award years for 1946-1949 have been adjusted, where necessary, to reconcile the media guide's claims with newspaper articles from the time period in question.

Year	Player	Position
1946	Pat McCarthy	G
1947	Gene Kinney	C
1948	Bob Ward	G
1949	Bob Ward	G
1950	Bob Ward	G
1951	Bob Ward	G
1952	William Maletzky	G
1953	Stan Jones	T
1954	Bob Pellegrini	G
1955	Mike Sandusky	T
1956	Al Wharton	T
1957	Don Healy	T
1958	Fred Cole	T
1959	Tom Gunderman	G
1960	Gary Collins	E
1961	Bill Kirchiro	T
1962	Dave Crossan	T
1963	Olaf Drozdov	T
1964	Dick Absher	E
1965	Dick Absher	E
1966	Jam Lavrusky	LB
1968	Ron Pearson	E
1969	Peter Mattia	DT
