= Linkous =

Linkous is a surname. Notable people with the surname include:

- Fred Linkous (1905–1930), American lacrosse player
- Mark Linkous (1962–2010), American singer-songwriter and musician
