= Knute Rockne Memorial Trophy =

A Knute Rockne Memorial Trophy was awarded by several organizations in honor of the great college football coach Knute Rockne, who died in a plane crash at the age of 43.

- Knute Rockne Memorial Trophy, presented annually by the DC Touchdown Club to the collegiate lineman of the year.
- Knute K. Rockne Intercollegiate Memorial Trophy, the national championship trophy awarded by the Dickinson System from 1931–1940.
