= Ed Mioduszewski =

American football player (1931–2010)

Edward Mioduszewski
No. 26
- Positions: Quarterback, defensive back

Personal information
- Born: October 28, 1931; Cliffside Park, New Jersey, U.S.
- Died: September 8, 2010 (aged 78); Spring Valley, California, U.S.
- Listed height: 5 ft 10 in (1.78 m)
- Listed weight: 185 lb (84 kg)

Career information
- High school: Cliffside Park
- College: William & Mary
- NFL draft: 1953: 18th round, 217th overall pick

Career history
- Pittsburgh Steelers (1953)*; Montreal Alouettes (1953)*; Baltimore Colts (1953)
- * Offseason or practice squad member only

Awards and highlights
- Second-team All-American (1952); 2× First-team All-Southern (1951, 1952)

Career NFL statistics
- Passing attempts: 30
- Passing completions: 11
- Completion percentage: 36.7%
- TD–INT: 2–2
- Passing yards: 113
- Passer rating: 42.8
- Stats at Pro Football Reference

Edward Thomas Mioduszewski (October 28, 1931 – September 8, 2010) was an American professional football player for the Baltimore Colts of the National Football League (NFL). He played quarterback in 12 games, starting one, during the 1953 NFL season. Mioduszewski played college football at William & Mary, where as a senior in 1952 he was named a second-team All-American by the Associated Press.

Mioduszewski died on September 8, 2010, at the age of 78.
