= Tom Cosgrove (American football) =

American football player (1930–2017)

Profile
- Position: Center

Personal information
- Born: June 21, 1930; Philadelphia, Pennsylvania, U.S.
- Died: March 27, 2017 (aged 86); Potomac, Maryland, U.S.
- Listed height: 6 ft 3 in (1.91 m)
- Listed weight: 235 lb (107 kg)

Career information
- College: Maryland
- NFL draft: 1952: 13th round, 156th overall pick

Awards and highlights
- Maryland Athletics HOF (2005)

Tom Cosgrove (June 21, 1930 – March 27, 2017) was an American football offensive lineman. He played collegiately for the Maryland Terrapins at the University of Maryland, starting on the varsity squad from 1949 to 1952.

In October 1952 Cosgrove made national news as one of three Maryland players coming forward ahead of a game to expose attempted bribery in conjunction with a point shaving scandal. A fugitive wanted in the case surrendered and was arrested shortly thereafter.

Cosgrove was selected in the 13th round of the 1952 NFL draft by the Cleveland Browns. His contract was traded to the expansion Baltimore Colts, who cut him at the end of training camp ahead of their debut 1953 season.

In 2005 Cosgrove was inducted into the University of Maryland Athletics Hall of Fame.

== Early life ==
Tom Cosgrove was born June 21, 1930, in Philadelphia, Pennsylvania. He attended West Catholic Preparatory High School, playing a reserve role for the school football team.

== College career ==
Cosgrove entered the University of Maryland in 1948, playing football on the freshman team. The influx of older student-athletes back from military service in World War II had worked its way through college ranks, and younger players were expected to play a more impactful role on the varsity football squad in 1949, in the estimation of Baltimore Sun sports editor Paul Menton.

Menton was not wrong. Tom Cosgrove was inserted as a starter at center from his first game in 1949.

In 1950, Cosgrove was named an honorable mention All-American.

In the 1951 season, Cosgrove was named a second-team All-American. He was also honored with the Coaches' Award for the team's most outstanding offensive lineman.

He played in the 1952 Sugar Bowl at Tulane Stadium, with Maryland defeating Tennessee, 28-13.

Cosgrove and Maryland quarterback Jack Scarbath were selected to play in the Senior Bowl in Mobile, Alabama, held January 3, 1953. The game was lost by the Marylanders and their South team, 28–13.

Cosgrove also played in the 1953 North-South Shrine Game and the College All-Star Game.

=== 1952 Bribery scandal ===
Tom Cosgrove (far R), his two teammates, and head coach at the time of the October 1952 point shaving scandal.

Although drafted into the NFL in January 1952, Cosgrove returned to Maryland in the fall of 1952 to play another season. In October he became the subject of national news coverage as part of a bribery scandal in which he and two of his teammates went to authorities and informed them they had been offered cash to alter the result of a forthcoming game with Louisiana State University (LSU). Cosgrove — a center who handled the ball on each offensive play — asserted that he had been offered $1,000 for his part in the $1,500, three player scandal.

Cosgrove and his two teammates — guard Frank Navarro and star quarterback Jack Scarbath — indicated that the bribes were offered as part of a point shaving scheme in which the Maryland squad was to keep the margin of victory under 21 points. The bribe offers were rejected by all three, who alerted authorities in advance of the game.

Maryland ultimately beat LSU by a score of 34–6, a margin of 28 points, in the October 25 game. An Associated Press news report noted of the game that "Scarbath completed three touchdown passes in the game. Cosgrove's [snaps] from center were accurate and fast. Navarro held his guard position as usual."

A fugitive wanted as a suspect in the case, Louis Leonard Glickfield of Hyattsville, Maryland, a 21-year old Maryland student, surrendered to authorities on October 29. He was convicted of the crime and sentenced to 18 months in the Maryland state reformatory and fined $1,000.

== Professional career ==
Cosgrove was selected by the Cleveland Browns in the sixth round (156th overall) of the 1952 NFL draft.

His contract was traded to the expansion Baltimore Colts. In July 1953 he reported to the team's first training camp at Western Maryland College in Westminster, Maryland. Cosgrove got playing time during the team's preseason schedule but was waived from the Colts in the final cut to the league limit of 33 players on September 23.

Cosgrove's situation is mentioned in the memoir of Colts lineman Art Donovan, who contends there was pressure on head coach Weeb Ewbank to keep Cosgrove on the Baltimore roster due to his roots at the neighboring University of Maryland despite Ewbank's desire to release him. "He was supposed to be an All-American but he really wasn't too good," Donovan recalled, "He was okay, not the best — he just had two great centers in front of him..." In an exhibition game against Pittsburgh, Cosgrove suffered an ankle injury, Donovan contends, but instead of sitting him as the injury required, Ewbank intentionally inserted Cosgrove into a game so that he would look slow and incapable on film, thereby eliminating any potential front office objection to a controversial cut.

== Life after football ==
After the end of his playing career Cosgrove became a commercial airline pilot. He flew for Capital Airlines and then for United Airlines after the two merged. Cosgrove retired in 1990 to Potomac, Maryland.

Cosgrove married Marguerite Wilson, with whom he had 8 children and 27 grandchildren.

== Death and legacy ==
Cosgrove died March 27, 2017, a Potomac, Maryland. His body was interred at Arlington National Cemetery Section 30, Site 841-RH.

In 2005, Tom Cosgrove was inducted into the University of Maryland Athletics Hall of Fame.
