= DC Touchdown Club =

College football awards organization

The DC Touchdown Club, earlier known as The Touchdown Club of Washington, D.C., was started in 1935 with a passion for charity and sports. In the ensuing years the Club has benefited many local charities as well as providing scholarships to deserving student/athletes. The Touchdown Timmies, the club's trophies, are given each year to athletes who excelled in their respective arenas including professionals, college and scholastic players. Additionally, the Club provided monies to 15 charitable organizations each year.

At one point, the name was changed to "Touchdown Club Charities of Washington, DC". It was founded by a group of college football enthusiasts in 1935, among them Dutch Bergman. The motto is "Children, Scholarship, and Community".

The Timmie Awards began with a formal dinner at the Willard Hotel in 1937 where All-American Quarterback Marshall Goldberg was honored as Best Player of the Year. Over the past sixty years, the club's dinner awards programs honoring of more than 200 outstanding college players and hundreds of professional high school athletes, have attracted celebrities from many fields and national media attention.

== Touchdown Club Founder ==
Arthur "Dutch" Bergman was a back with George Gipp on the Notre Dame teams of the 1920s. He was later assistant football coach at the University of Minnesota and the University of New Mexico, and head coach at Catholic University, winning their first Orange Bowl in 1936, and head coach of the Eastern Division titlist Washington Redskins of 1943. Dutch was also an Army flyer in World War I, a mining engineer, a top-level Government official, a sports writer, a broadcaster and, finally, manager of the D.C. Armory and RFK Stadium.

The "Timmie Awards" are the name given to the awards that the club awarded beginning in 1946. In addition to an NFL Player of the Year, they also award a Coach of the Year and administered the Washington Redskins team awards, among others. The club was the first to award a "MVP" award to a defensive player, Gene Brito, in 1955. The Philadelphia Maxwell Club awarded a similar honor to Andy Robustelli in 1962.

== NFL Player of the Year awards ==
As voted on by the DC Touchdown Club
1944—Roy Zimmerman, Philadelphia Eagles
1945—Bob Waterfield, Cleveland Rams
1946—Bill Dudley, Pittsburgh Steelers
1947—Sammy Baugh, Washington Redskins
1948—Sammy Baugh (2), Washington Redskins
1949—Steve Van Buren, Philadelphia Eagles; Otto Graham, Cleveland Browns
1950—Bob Waterfield, Los Angeles Rams
1951—Otto Graham, Cleveland Browns
1952—Lynn Chandnois, Pittsburgh Steelers
1953—Lou Groza, Cleveland Browns
1954—Norm Van Brocklin, Los Angeles Rams
1955—Gene Brito, Washington Redskins
1956—Frank Gifford, New York Giants
1957—Johnny Unitas, Baltimore Colts
1958—Johnny Unitas (2), Baltimore Colts and Jim Brown, Cleveland Browns
1959—Charley Conerly, New York Giants
1960—Norm Van Brocklin (2), Philadelphia Eagles
1961—Paul Hornung, Green Bay Packers
1962—Y. A. Tittle, New York Giants
1963—Jim Brown (2), Cleveland Browns
1964—Lenny Moore, Baltimore Colts
1965—Pete Retzlaff, Philadelphia Eagles
1966—Jim Nance, Boston Patriots, (AFL); Sonny Jurgensen, Washington Redskins, (NFL)
1967—Lance Alworth, San Diego Chargers, (AFL); Johnny Unitas (3), Baltimore Colts, (NFL)
1968—Daryle Lamonica, Oakland Raiders, (AFL); Ray Nitschke, Green Bay Packers, (NFL)
1969—Lance Alworth (2), San Diego Chargers, (AFL); Sonny Jurgensen (2), Washington Redskins, (NFL)
1970—Fran Tarkenton, New York Giants
1971—Billy Kilmer, Washington Redskins; Jack Pardee, Washington Redskins
1972—Larry Brown, Washington Redskins
1973—O. J. Simpson, Buffalo Bills
1974—Joe Greene, Pittsburgh Steelers
1975—Fran Tarkenton (2), Minnesota Vikings
1976—Roger Staubach, Dallas Cowboys (NFC); Bert Jones, Baltimore Colts (AFC)
1977—Walter Payton, Chicago Bears, (NFC); Craig Morton, Denver Broncos, (AFC)
1978—Pat Haden, Los Angeles Rams, (NFC); Jim Zorn, Seattle Seahawks, (AFC)
1979—Joe Theismann, Washington Redskins (NFC); Dan Fouts, San Diego Chargers (AFC)
1980—Steve Bartkowski, Atlanta Falcons (NFC); Brian Sipe, Cleveland Browns (AFC)
1981—Tony Dorsett, Dallas Cowboys (NFC); Ken Anderson, Cincinnati Bengals (AFC)
1982—Mark Moseley, Washington Redskins (NFC); Dan Fouts (2); San Diego Chargers (AFC)
1983—Eric Dickerson, Los Angeles Rams (NFC); Curt Warner, Seattle Seahawks (AFC)
1984—Eric Dickerson (2), Los Angeles Rams (NFC); Dan Marino, Miami Dolphins
1985—Walter Payton (2), Chicago Bears (NFC); Ken O'Brien, New York Jets (AFC)
1986—Lawrence Taylor, New York Giants (NFC); Al Toon, New York Jets (AFC)
1987—Joe Montana, San Francisco 49ers (NFC); John Elway, Denver Broncos (AFC)
1988—Roger Craig, San Francisco 49ers (NFC); Boomer Esiason, Cincinnati Bengals (AFC)
1989—Joe Montana (2), San Francisco 49ers (NFC); Christian Okoye, Kansas City Chiefs (AFC)
1990—Barry Sanders, Detroit Lions (NFC); Jim Kelly, Buffalo Bills (AFC)
1991—Mark Rypien, Washington Redskins (NFC); Thurman Thomas, Buffalo Bills (AFC)
1992—Steve Young, San Francisco (NFC); Barry Foster, Pittsburgh Steelers (AFC)
1993—Mark Stepnoski, Dallas Cowboys (NFC); Rod Woodson, Pittsburgh Steelers (AFC)
1994—Steve Young, San Francisco 49ers (NFC); Junior Seau, San Diego Chargers (AFC)
1995—Brett Favre, Green Bay Packers (NFC); Steve Bono, Kansas City Chiefs (AFC)
1996—Kevin Greene, Carolina Panthers (NFC); Bruce Smith, Buffalo Bills (AFC)
1997—Brett Favre (2), Green Bay Packers (NFC); Terrell Davis, Denver Broncos (AFC)
1998—Randall Cunningham, Minnesota Vikings (NFC); Terrell Davis (2), Denver Broncos (AFC)
1999—Kurt Warner, St. Louis Rams (NFC); Peyton Manning, Indianapolis Colts (AFC)
2000—Marshall Faulk, St. Louis Rams (NFC); Rich Gannon, Oakland Raiders(AFC)
2001—Kurt Warner (2), St. Louis Rams (NFC); Rich Gannon (2), Oakland Raiders (AFC)
2002—Brett Favre (3), Green Bay Packers (NFC); Rich Gannon (3), Oakland Raiders (AFC)
2003—Randy Moss, Minnesota Vikings (NFC); Jamal Lewis, Baltimore Ravens (AFC)
2004—Donovan McNabb, Philadelphia Eagles (NFC); Peyton Manning (2), Indianapolis Colts (AFC)
2005—Shaun Alexander, Seattle Seahawks (NFC); Carson Palmer, Cincinnati Bengals (AFC)
2006—Drew Brees, New Orleans Saints (NFC); LaDainian Tomlinson, San Diego Chargers (AFC)
2007—Brett Favre (4), Green Bay Packers (NFC); Tom Brady, New England Patriots (AFC)
2008—Kurt Warner (3), Arizona Cardinals (NFC); Peyton Manning (3), Indianapolis Colts (AFC)
2009—Brett Favre (5), Minnesota Vikings (NFC); Peyton Manning (4), Indianapolis Colts (AFC)

== Knute Rockne Memorial Trophy ==
Presented annually by the DC Touchdown Club to the collegiate lineman of the year
1939—Ken Kavanaugh, E, LSU
1940—Bob Suffridge, G, Tennessee
1941—Endicott Peabody, G, Harvard
1942—Bob Dove, E, Notre Dame
1943—Cas Myslinski, C, Army
1944—Don Whitmire, T, Navy
1945—Dick Duden, E, Navy
1946—Burr Baldwin, E, UCLA
1947—Chuck Bednarik, C, Pennsylvania
1948—Bill Fischer, G, Notre Dame
1949—Leon Hart, E, Notre Dame
1950—Bud McFadin, G, Texas
1951—Bob Ward, G, Maryland
1952—Dick Modzelewski, T, Maryland
1953—Stan Jones, T, Maryland
1954—Max Boydston, E, Oklahoma
1955—Bob Pellegrini, C, Maryland
1956—Jerry Tubbs, C, Oklahoma
1957—Lou Michaels, T, Kentucky
1958—Bob Novogratz, G, Army
1959—Roger Davis, G, Syracuse
1960—Tom Brown, G, Minnesota
1961—Joe Romig, G, Colorado
1962—Pat Richter, E, Wisconsin
1963—Dick Butkus, C, Illinois
1964—Dick Butkus, C, Illinois
1965—Tommy Nobis, G, Texas
1966—Jim Lynch, DE, Notre Dame
1967—Ron Yary, T, Southern California
1968—Ted Hendricks, DE, Miami
1969—Mike Reid, T, Penn State
1970—Jim Stillwagon, T, Ohio State
1971—Larry Jacobson, DT, Nebraska
1972—John Hannah, OG, Alabama
1973—Ed "Too Tall" Jones, DE, Tennessee State
1974—Randy White, DE, Maryland
1975—Lee Roy Selmon, DE, Oklahoma
1976—Wilson Whitley, DT, Houston
1977—Ken MacAfee, TE, Notre Dame
1978—Greg Roberts, OG, Oklahoma
1979—Bruce Clark, DE, Penn State
1980—Hugh Green, DE, Pittsburgh
1981—Kenneth Sims, DE, Texas
1982—Billy Ray Smith Jr., DE, Arkansas
1983—Bill Fralic, OT, Pittsburgh
1984—Bruce Smith, DE, Virginia Tech
1985—Tony Casillas, DT, Oklahoma
1986—Gordon Lockbaum, RB, Holy Cross
1987—Chad Hennings, DT, Air Force
1988—Tracy Rocker, DT, Auburn
1989—Chris Zorich, DT, Notre Dame
1990—Chris Zorich, DT, Notre Dame
1992—Eric Curry, DE, Alabama
1993—Aaron Taylor, OT, Notre Dame
1994—Ruben Brown, OG, Pittsburgh
1995—Nebraska offensive line
1996—Orlando Pace, OT, Ohio State

== Walter Camp Memorial Trophy ==
Since 1937, presented annually by the DC Touchdown Club to the collegiate back of the year

1939—Nile Kinnick, HB, Iowa
1946—Charley Trippi, HB, Georgia
1954—Ralph Guglielmi, QB, Notre Dame
1959—Billy Cannon, HB, LSU
1961—Ernie Davis, HB, Syracuse
1962—Jerry Stovall, HB, LSU
1963—Roger Staubach, QB, Navy
1966—Steve Spurrier, QB, Florida
1968—O. J. Simpson, RB, USC
1969—Archie Manning, QB, Ole Miss

== Touchdown Club Charities Hall of Fame ==
Touchdown Club Charities hosts its own Football Hall of Fame. Starting in 2000, the Club has decided to expand its Hall of Fame selection process to include the American public at large. The top 10 nominees will be presented to the public for election. The top five will be elected and inducted into the Hall of Fame at a date subsequent to the election.

Distinguished individuals in the DC Touchdown Club Hall of Fame are players such as “Dutch” Bergman, George Preston Marshall, Knute Rockne, Bronko Nagurski, Jim Thorpe, Bobby Mitchell, Sammy Baugh, Walter Camp, Sonny Jurgensen, Red Grange and Johnny Unitas that are in the Hall of Fame. More recent inductees include Gene Upshaw and Larry Brown.

== See also ==
- Touchdown Club of Columbus
- Bert Bell Award
- Maxwell Football Club
- Kansas City Committee of 101 Awards
- National Football League Most Valuable Player Award
- NFL Defensive Player of the Year Award
- NFL Offensive Player of the Year Award
- UPI AFL-AFC Player of the Year
- UPI NFC Player of the Year
