= Andrew Crummey =

American football player (born 1984)

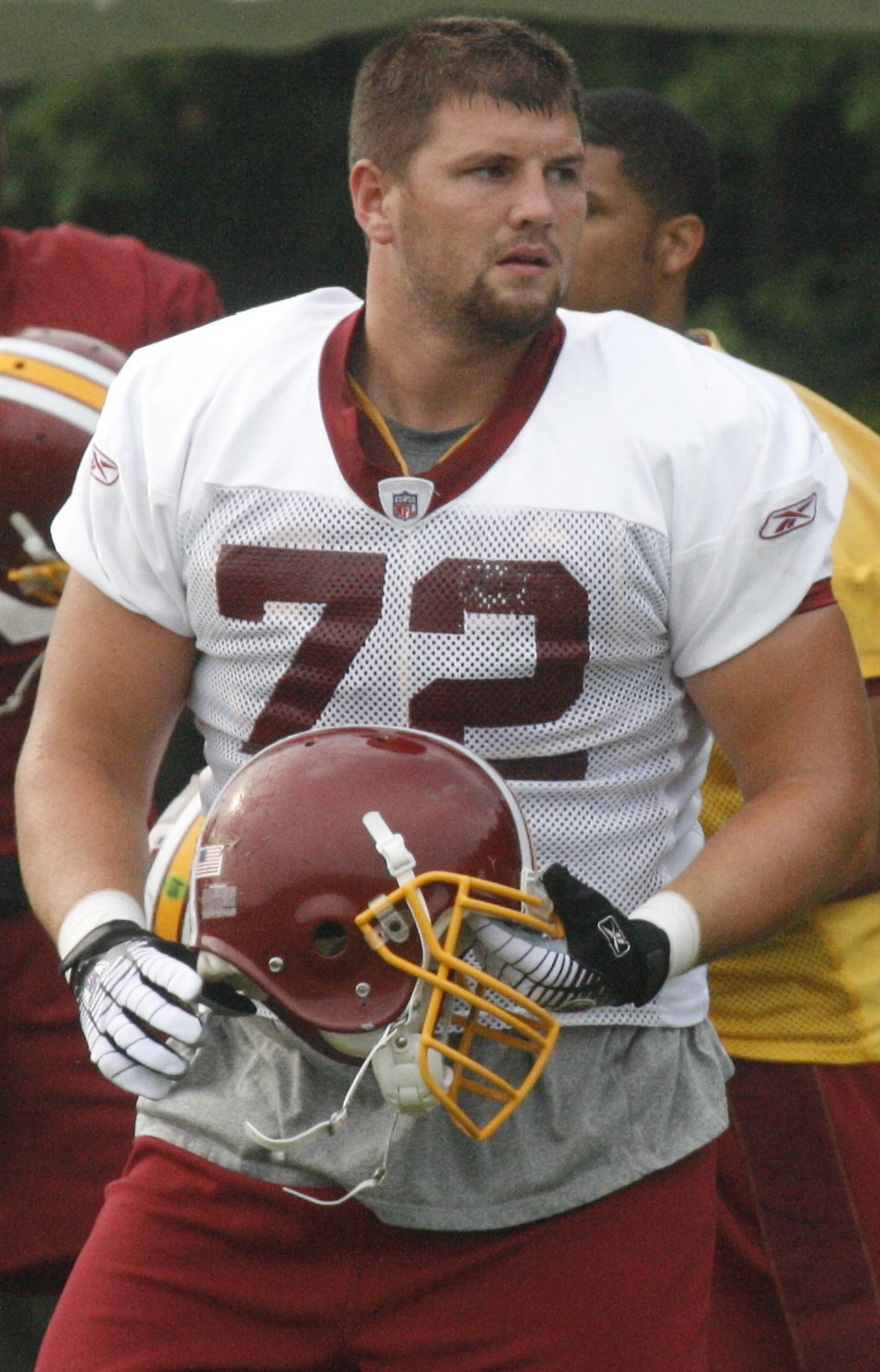
- Crummey at Redskins training camp

No. 60, 63
- Position: Center

Personal information
- Born: October 22, 1984 (age 42); Van Wert, Ohio, U.S.
- Listed height: 6 ft 5 in (1.96 m)
- Listed weight: 301 lb (137 kg)

Career information
- College: Maryland
- NFL draft: 2008: undrafted

Career history
- Washington Redskins (2008)*; Cincinnati Bengals (2008); Houston Texans (2009)*; Jacksonville Jaguars (2010)*; Carolina Panthers (2010)*; Las Vegas Locomotives (2010–2011)
- * Offseason or practice squad member only

Awards and highlights
- UFL champion (2010); Third-team All-American (2007); Second-team Freshman All-American (2004); 2× Second-team All-ACC (2006-2007)

Career NFL statistics
- Games played: 6
- Stats at Pro Football Reference

Andrew Crummey (born October 22, 1984) is an American former professional football player who was a guard in the National Football League (NFL). He played college football for the Maryland Terrapins and was signed by the Washington Redskins as an undrafted free agent in 2008.

Crummey was also a member of the Cincinnati Bengals, Houston Texans, Jacksonville Jaguars, Carolina Panthers, and Las Vegas Locomotives.

== Early life ==
Crummey graduated from Van Wert High School where he helped his team to a state championship game in 2000.
