= Ed Vereb =

American football player (1934–2014)

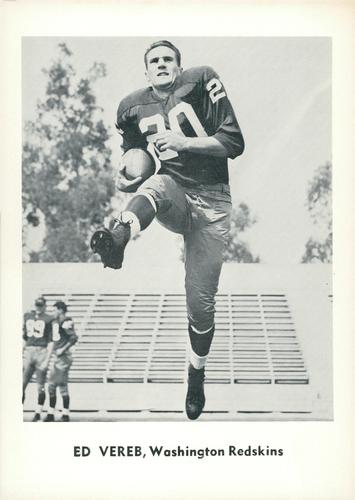

No. 89, 20, 25
- Position: Halfback

Personal information
- Born: May 21, 1934; Pittsburgh, Pennsylvania, U.S.
- Died: December 18, 2014 (aged 80); Bowie, Maryland, U.S.
- Listed height: 6 ft 0 in (1.83 m)
- Listed weight: 190 lb (86 kg)

Career information
- High school: Central Catholic (Pittsburgh)
- College: Maryland
- NFL draft: 1956: 1st round, 12th overall pick

Career history

Playing
- BC Lions (1956, 1958–1960); Washington Redskins (1960); BC Lions (1961)

Coaching
- BC Lions (1961) Backfield

Awards and highlights
- CFL West All-Star (1956); National champion (1953); Second-team All-American (1955); First-team All-ACC (1955)

Career NFL statistics
- Rushing yards: 38
- Rushing average: 2
- Receptions: 9
- Receiving yards: 119
- Stats at Pro Football Reference

Edward John Vereb (May 21, 1934 – December 18, 2014) was an American professional football halfback in the Canadian Football League (CFL) with the BC Lions and the National Football League (NFL) for the Washington Redskins. He played college football at the University of Maryland and was selected in the first round of the 1956 NFL draft. He played four seasons with the B.C. Lions, being named an all-star in 1956.

In 1961, the BC Lions hired Vereb as its backfield coach. He died from complications of Alzheimer's disease in 2014.
