= Fred Linkous =

American lacrosse player (1905–1930)

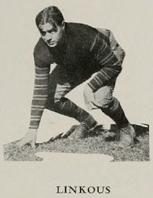
- Linkous in football equipment in 1927

Biographical details
- Born: September 1905; Tazewell County, Virginia, U.S.
- Died: March 27, 1930 (aged 24); Severna Park, Maryland, U.S.

Playing career
- 1926–1928: Maryland
- Position: Home

Coaching career (HC unless noted)
- 1928–1930: Severn School

Accomplishments and honors

Awards
- National Lacrosse Hall of Fame (1967); University of Maryland Athletic Hall of Fame (1982); 1928 USILA All-American first team; 1927 USILA All-American honorable mention

Frederick Cecil Linkous (1905–1930) was an American lacrosse player. He attended college at the University of Maryland, where he was a multi-sport athlete, and won varsity letters in basketball, football, and lacrosse. In 1928, he was named a United States Intercollegiate Lacrosse Association (USILA) first-team All-American. He was inducted into the National Lacrosse Hall of Fame in 1967.

== Biography ==
Linkous was born in September 1905 in Tazewell County, Virginia. He attended Highland High School in Harford County, Maryland, and played both basketball and soccer. In 1924, upon graduating high school, he enrolled at the University of Maryland.

He participated on the freshman football, basketball, and lacrosse teams, and in the following three years, earned three varsity letters in each as well. In 1927, the USILA named Linkous an honorable mention All-American at "home" position. As a senior in 1928, USILA named him the first-team All-American at the "in home" position. In basketball, Linkous was the team captain as a senior and was named an All-Southern Conference guard.

He was selected into the Omicron Delta Kappa leadership fraternity and Delta Sigma Phi fraternity. He served as the Sergeant-at-Arms of the Junior Class, and the Sergeant-at-Arms of the Student Assembly as a senior. Linkous graduated in 1928, having earned a Bachelor of Science degree in education.

Linkous then took a job as a teacher and football coach at the Severn School, where he served until his death. He died at the age of 24 on March 27, 1930, from a throat infection. Linkous was inducted into the National Lacrosse Hall of Fame in 1967, and the University of Maryland Athletic Hall of Fame in 1982.
