= 1952 Sugar Bowl =

American college football game

- 18th Sugar Bowl
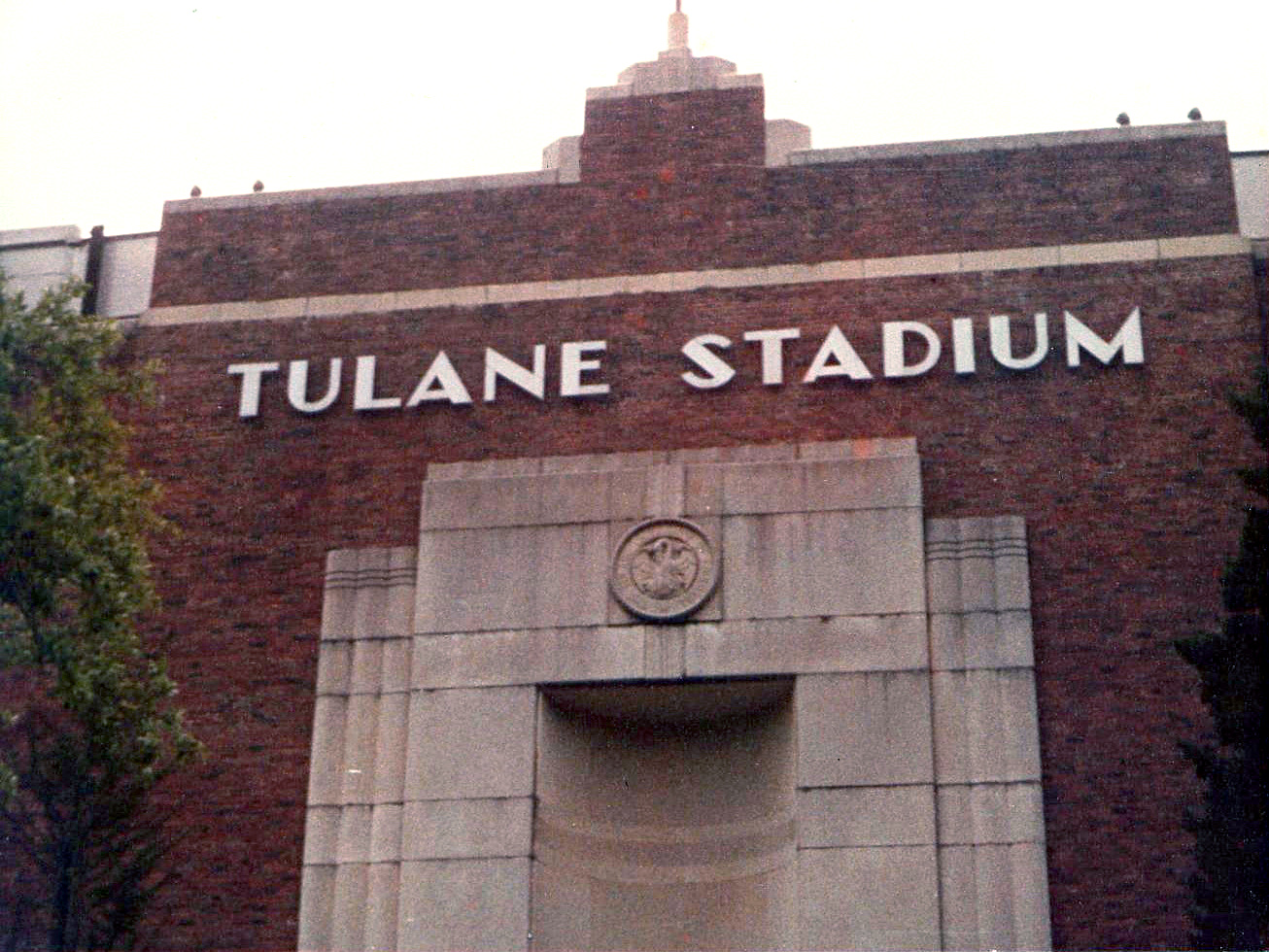
- Tulane Stadium in New Orleans, Louisiana, hosted the Sugar Bowl.
Maryland Terrapins	Tennessee Volunteers
(9–0)	(10–0)
SoCon	SEC
28	13
Head coach: Jim Tatum	Head coach: Robert Neyland
AP / Coaches; 3 / 4	AP / Coaches; 1 / 1
	1	2	3	4	Total
Maryland	7	14	7	0	28
Tennessee	0	6	0	7	13
- Date: January 1, 1952
- Season: 1951
- Stadium: Tulane Stadium
- Location: New Orleans, Louisiana
- MVP: Ed Modzelewski
- Referee: W.R. Dukes (Southern; split crew: Southern, SEC)
- Attendance: 82,271

The 1952 Sugar Bowl was a postseason American college football bowl game between the Tennessee Volunteers and the Maryland Terrapins at Tulane Stadium in New Orleans, Louisiana, on January 1, 1952. It was the eighteenth edition of the annual Sugar Bowl football contest. Tennessee represented the Southeastern Conference (SEC) in the contest, while Maryland represented the Southern Conference. Both teams were unbeaten during their respective seasons.

Tennessee featured the Heisman Trophy runner-up, Hank Lauricella.

In the first quarter, Maryland scored on a two-yard touchdown run by Ed Fullerton, giving the Terrapins a 7–0 lead. In the second quarter, Fullerton threw a six-yard touchdown pass to Bob Shemonski, as the Terrapins built a 14–0 lead. Jack Scarbath scored on a one-yard touchdown run making it 21–0. Tennessee got on the board with a 4-yard touchdown pass from Payne to Rechichar, as the score was 21–6 at halftime. In the third quarter, Fullerton scored on a 46-yard interception return making it 28–6. In the fourth quarter, Tennessee's Payne scored on a 2-yard touchdown run making the final score 28–13. Ed Modzelewski was named the game MVP.
