= Bob Pellegrini =

American football player (1934–2008)

No. 53
- Positions: Linebacker, guard

Personal information
- Born: November 13, 1934; Williamsport, Pennsylvania, U.S.
- Died: April 11, 2008 (aged 73); Marmora, New Jersey, U.S.
- Listed height: 6 ft 2 in (1.88 m)
- Listed weight: 233 lb (106 kg)

Career information
- College: Maryland
- NFL draft: 1956: 1st round, 4th overall pick

Career history

Playing
- Philadelphia Eagles (1956–1961); Washington Redskins (1962–1965)

Coaching
- Miami Dolphins (1966-1967) Linebackers; Philadelphia Bell (1974) Linebackers

Awards and highlights
- NFL champion (1960); National champion (1953); UPI Lineman of the Year (1955); Unanimous All-American (1955); ACC Player of the Year (1955); Second-team All-ACC (1954)

Career NFL statistics
- Interceptions: 13
- Fumble recoveries: 10
- Sacks: 5.5
- Stats at Pro Football Reference
- College Football Hall of Fame

Robert Francis Pellegrini (November 13, 1934 – April 11, 2008) was an American professional football player who was a linebacker in the National Football League (NFL) for the Philadelphia Eagles and Washington Redskins. He played college football for the Maryland Terrapins, earning All-American homors as a center. Pellegrini was selected in the first round (fourth overall) of the 1956 NFL draft. In 1996, he was inducted into the College Football Hall of Fame.

In 1955, he finished sixth in number of votes for the Heisman Trophy. He was featured on the cover of the November 7, 1955 edition of Sports Illustrated magazine. He was a member of the Gamma Chi chapter of the Sigma Chi Fraternity at the University of Maryland. All American football players Chet "the Jet" Hanulak and Bill Walker were fellow Sigma Chi Fraternity brothers of Pellegrini at Maryland.

After his professional playing career with the Philadelphia Eagles and Washington Redskins, he joined the Miami Dolphins staff as the linebackers coach from 1966 to 1967.

Pellegrini died aged 73 on April 11, 2008, at his home in the Marmora section of Upper Township, New Jersey.
