= Ed Modzelewski =

American football player (1929–2015)

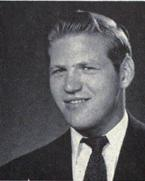
- Modzelewski as a senior at Maryland

No. 39, 36
- Position: Fullback

Personal information
- Born: January 13, 1929; West Natrona, Pennsylvania, U.S.
- Died: February 28, 2015 (aged 86); West Sedona, Arizona, U.S.
- Listed height: 6 ft 0 in (1.83 m)
- Listed weight: 217 lb (98 kg)

Career information
- High school: Natrona Heights (PA) Har-Brack
- College: Maryland
- NFL draft: 1952: 1st round, 6th overall pick

Career history
- Pittsburgh Steelers (1952); Cleveland Browns (1955–1959)

Awards and highlights
- NFL champion (1955); First-team All-American (1951); 2× All-SoCon (1950, 1951)

Career NFL statistics
- Rushing yards: 1,292
- Rushing average: 3.3
- Receptions: 38
- Receiving yards: 277
- Total touchdowns: 14
- Stats at Pro Football Reference

Edward Walter Modzelewski (January 13, 1929 – February 28, 2015) was an American professional football fullback, who played in the National Football League (NFL) for the Pittsburgh Steelers and the Cleveland Browns. He played college football for the University of Maryland.

== Early life ==
Growing up in West Natrona, Pennsylvania as one of six children, he was a three-sport athlete at Har-Brack High School (now Highlands High School).

He accepted a scholarship from the University of Maryland, where he became a three-year starter. As a sophomore, he contributed to the team having a 9–1 record.

In 1951, he was a part of an undefeated team (10-0 record), that outscored its opponents, 381–74. Maryland also secured its first berth in a major postseason bowl game, the 1952 Sugar Bowl, where it upset the first-ranked University of Tennessee, with him playing a key role after rushing for 153 yards and being named the game's outstanding player. He finished the year with 825 yards and averaging 7.3 yards a carry.

== Professional career ==
=== Pittsburgh Steelers ===
Modzelewski was selected by the Pittsburgh Steelers in the first round (6th overall) of the 1952 NFL draft. After his rookie season, he served two years in the Air Force.

Upon his discharge and return in 1955, he hurt his back in training camp and was traded to the Cleveland Browns in exchange for future hall of famer Marion Motley.

=== Cleveland Browns ===
In 1955, he registered 619 rushing yards (ninth in the league) and 6 touchdowns, playing a key role in the Cleveland Browns repeating as NFL champions. He was a starter for two years until the arrival of future hall of famer Jim Brown in 1957.

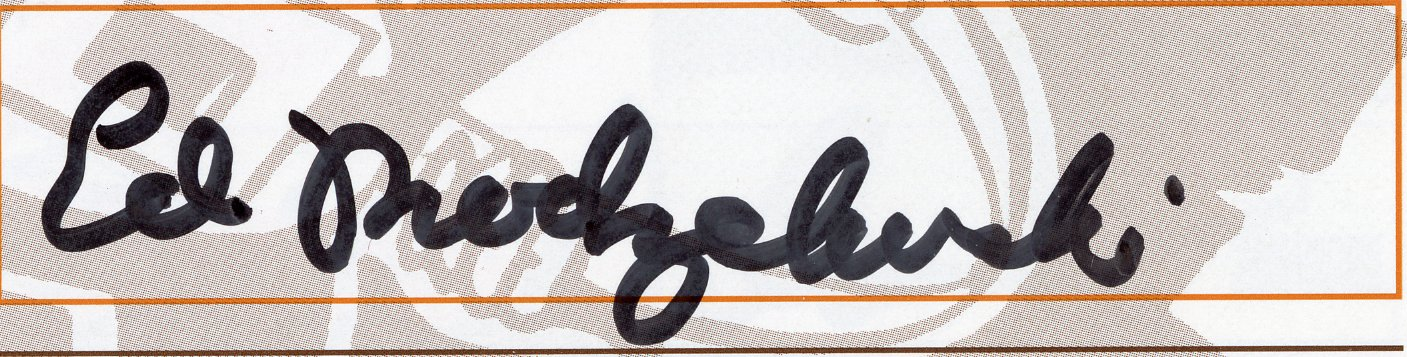

Modzelewski was selected by the Dallas Cowboys in the 1960 NFL expansion draft, but he opted to retire instead of reporting to the team.

== Personal life ==
After football, he chose to set up a high-end restaurant named Mo and Juniors instead. The family owned the place. Oldest brother Joe was a chef and Ed managed it. Dick worked the room during the off season when he lived in Cleveland despite playing for the New York Giants. Ed later became the president of Beef Corral Inc, which had 11 outlets in the Cleveland area. The franchise business was a huge success among the fans and the local community.

Modzelewski's parents, Joe and Martha had a big family. Ed's siblings included Joe, Gene, Dick, Betty Lou, and Florence Nowicki. Ed was married to Mary Modzelewski and later, Joanne Modzelewski. Ed Modzelewski's children included Scott Alan Modzelewski; Michael Modzelewski, Bruce Modzelewski and Nancy Giacobbe. Ed had three grandchildren, Lance Modzelewski, Anthony Giacobbe, and Jenny Modzelewski.

He died of congestive heart failure in 2015 at the age of 86 at his home in West Sedona, Arizona. His brother Dick Modzelewski also played in the National Football League.
