= Jack Scarbath =

American football player (1930–2020)

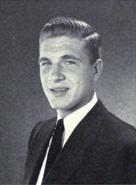
- Scarbath as a senior at Maryland

No. 18, 95, 12
- Position: Quarterback

Personal information
- Born: August 12, 1930; Baltimore, Maryland, U.S.
- Died: December 6, 2020 (aged 90); Rising Sun, Maryland, U.S.
- Listed height: 6 ft 2 in (1.88 m)
- Listed weight: 206 lb (93 kg)

Career information
- High school: Baltimore Polytechnic Institute
- College: Maryland
- NFL draft: 1953: 1st round, 3rd overall pick

Career history
- Washington Redskins (1953–1954); Ottawa Rough Riders (1955); Pittsburgh Steelers (1956)

Awards and highlights
- Unanimous All-American (1952); SoCon Player of the Year (1952); First-team All-Southern (1952)

Career NFL statistics
- Passing attempts: 279
- Passing completions: 101
- Completion percentage: 36.2%
- TD–INT: 18–30
- Passing yards: 1,868
- Passer rating: 42.1
- Stats at Pro Football Reference
- College Football Hall of Fame

John Carl Scarbath (August 12, 1930 – December 6, 2020) was an American professional football player who was a quarterback in the National Football League (NFL) for the Washington Redskins and Pittsburgh Steelers. He was inducted into the College Football Hall of Fame in 1983.

== Early life ==
Scarbath was born in the Hamilton section of Baltimore, Maryland, on August 12, 1930 and attended high school at the Baltimore Polytechnic Institute. He played football as a quarterback and basketball as a guard. At Poly, Scarbath came to the attention of former Maryland coach and then university president Harry C. Byrd, who offered him a full athletic scholarship.

== College career ==
As a freshman at the University of Maryland, Scarbath poured cement as a construction worker in the building of the school's Byrd Stadium. He later worked at a foundry, which also helped to keep him in shape for football.

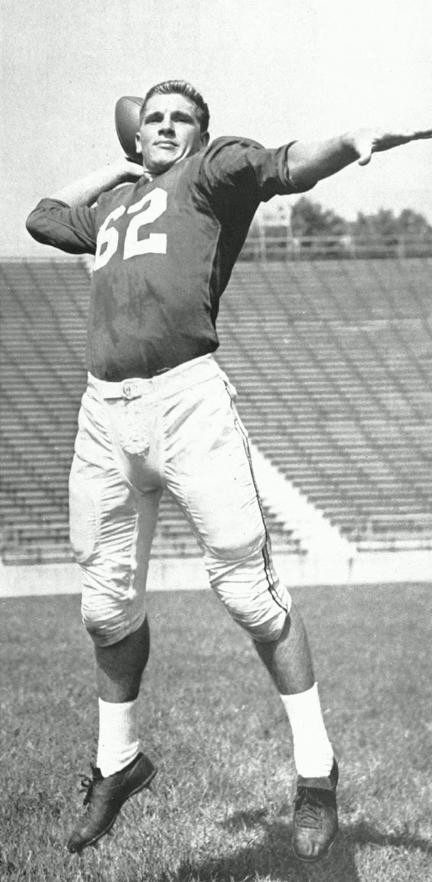
Scarbath as a Maryland Terrapin

The Maryland Terrapins compiled a 24-4-1 record with Scarbath as quarterback and defeated Tennessee in the 1951 Sugar Bowl. In 1952, he was unanimously selected to the All-America first-team and finished as the runner-up in votes for the Heisman Trophy. Scarbath was also Southern Conference Player of the Year and the South's Most Valuable Player in the North–South Shrine Game. He played lacrosse for Maryland during the 1952 season. Scarbath graduated from Maryland in 1954 with an industrial engineering degree.

== Professional career ==
The Washington Redskins selected Scarbath in the first round of the 1953 NFL draft as the third overall pick. He played with Washington from 1953 to 1954. In 1955, Scarbath played in the Canadian Football League for the Ottawa Rough Riders. He returned to the NFL to play for the Pittsburgh Steelers in 1956, his final season in the NFL. After leaving the NFL, Scarbath served as an assistant coach for the University of South Carolina for the next five years.

== Later life and awards ==
Scarbath founded and served as the chief executive officer of his own business, John C. Scarbath and Sons abrasives company, which he sold in 1995. He then worked with the Maryland Education Foundation to provide college scholarships to prospective scholar-athletes.

The College Football Hall of Fame inducted Scarbath in 1983, and the University of Maryland Athletic Hall of Fame inducted him in 1984. Scarbath died of heart failure on December 6, 2020, at 90 years of age.
