= 1951 San Francisco Dons football team =

American college football season

1951 San Francisco Dons football
- Conference: Independent

Ranking
- Coaches: No. 14
- AP: No. 14
- Record: 9–0
- Head coach: Joe Kuharich (4th season)
- Home stadium: Kezar Stadium

1951 Western college football independents records
	Conf.			Overall
Team	W	L	T	W		L		T
No. 14 San Francisco		–		9	–	0	–	0
La Verne		–		5	–	3	–	0
Pacific (CA)		–		6	–	5	–	0
Fresno State		–		5	–	5	–	0
Santa Clara		–		3	–	5	–	1
Hawaii		–		4	–	7	–	0
Loyola (CA)		–		3	–	6	–	0
San Jose State		–		2	–	7	–	1
Cal Poly San Dimas		–		1	–	6	–	0
Rankings from AP Poll

The 1951 San Francisco Dons football team was an American football team that represented the University of San Francisco as an independent during the 1951 college football season. In their fourth season under head coach Joe Kuharich, the Dons compiled a 9–0 record, outscored opponents by a total of 338 to 86, and were ranked No. 14 in the final AP Poll. The team was ranked at No. 27 in the 1951 Litkenhous Ratings.

The 1951 Dons team is considered one of the great teams in college football history, with ten starting players drafted into the NFL, including three Hall of Famers — Gino Marchetti, Ollie Matson, and Bob St. Clair. Five others on the squad — Ed Brown, Joe "Scooter" Scudero, Ralph Thomas, Mike Mergen, and Red Stephens — went on to make NFL Rosters.

The Dons were invited to play in the 1952 Orange Bowl, held in segregated Florida, on the condition that the team's African-American stars Matson and Burl Toler would not play. The Dons refused the offer: "We told them to go to Hell," recalled St. Clair.

The 1951 Dons, and their fight for racial equality, were the subject of a book, Undefeated, Untied and Uninvited by Kristine Clark, as well as a 2014 documentary film, '51 Dons.

Two days after the final game of the 1951 season, the University of San Francisco disbanded its football program.

== Schedule ==
Date	Opponent	Rank	Site	Result	Attendance	Source
September 21	San Jose State		Kezar Stadium; San Francisco, CA	W 39–2	16,000	
September 29	vs. Idaho		old Bronco Stadium; Boise, ID	W 28–7	10,000	
October 7	Camp Pendleton		Kezar Stadium; San Francisco, CA	W 26–0	6,500	
October 12	at San Jose State		Spartan Stadium; San Jose, CA	W 42–7	10,000	
October 20	at Fordham		Triborough Stadium; New York, NY	W 32–26	15,250	
October 26	San Diego NTS	No. 20	Kezar Stadium; San Francisco, CA	W 26–7		
November 4	Santa Clara	No. 20	Kezar Stadium; San Francisco, CA	W 26–7	32,685	
November 17	at Pacific (CA)	No. 14	Valley Bowl; Stockton, CA	W 47–14	41,607	
November 25	at Loyola (CA)	No. 13	Rose Bowl; Pasadena, CA	W 20–2	15,750	
Rankings from AP Poll released prior to the game
