= 1951 Chico State Wildcats football team =

American college football season

1951 Chico State Wildcats football
- Conference: Far Western Conference
- Record: 0–7 (0–4 FWC)
- Head coach: Paul J. Smith (2nd season)
- Home stadium: Costar Field

1951 Far Western Conference football standings
	Conf.					Overall
Team	W		L		T	W		L		T
Cal Aggies $	3	–	1	–	0	5	–	4	–	0
San Francisco State	2	–	0	–	0	8	–	2	–	0
Humboldt State	2	–	1	–	0	4	–	3	–	1
Southern Oregon	1	–	2	–	0	1	–	8	–	0
Chico State	0	–	4	–	0	0	–	7	–	0
$ – Conference champion

The 1951 Chico State Wildcats football team represented Chico State College—now known as California State University, Chico—as a member of the Far Western Conference (FWC) during the 1951 college football season. Led by Paul J. Smith in his second and final season as head coach, Chico State compiled an overall record of 0–7 with a mark of 0–4 in conference play, placing last out of five teams in the FWC. The team was outscored by its opponents 214 to 53 for the season. The Wildcats played home games at Chico High School's Costar Field in Chico, California.

Smith finished his tenure at Chico State with an overall a record of 2–13, for a .133 winning percentage. This is the worst winning percentage of any coach in Chico State Wildcats football history.

== Schedule ==
Date	Time	Opponent	Site	Result	Attendance	Source
October 6	8:00 p.m.	Humboldt State	Costar Field; Chico, CA	L 0–36		
October 13	8:00 p.m.	San Francisco State	Costar Field; Chico, CA	L 6–25	1,000	
October 20	8:00 p.m.	vs. Southern Oregon	Marshfield High School gridiron; Coos Bay, OR (Myrtle Bowl)	L 6–14	3,000	
October 27	8:00 p.m.	Naval Air Station Alameda (Note: Naval Air Station Alameda was a Naval Air Station from 1940 to 1997. For many years they fielded a team that played against colleges and other military teams.)*^{†}	Costar Field; Chico, CA	L 13–33		
November 3	8:00 p.m.	Cal Poly*	Costar Field; Chico, CA	L 0–19	1,000	
November 9	8:00 p.m.	at Cal Aggies	Aggie Field; Davis, CA	L 21–34		
November 17		at Willamette*	McCulloch Stadium; Salem, OR	L 7–53		
*Non-conference game; ^{†}Homecoming; All times are in Pacific time
