= 1951 Cal Poly San Dimas Broncos football team =

American college football season

1951 Cal Poly San Dimas Broncos football
- Conference: Independent
- Record: 1–6
- Head coach: Don Rees (1st season)

1951 Western college football independents records
| | Conf. | | | Overall |
| Team | W | L | T | W | | L | | T |
|---|---|---|---|---|---|---|---|---|
| No. 14 San Francisco | | – | | 9 | – | 0 | – | 0 |
| La Verne | | – | | 5 | – | 3 | – | 0 |
| Pacific (CA) | | – | | 6 | – | 5 | – | 0 |
| Fresno State | | – | | 5 | – | 5 | – | 0 |
| Santa Clara | | – | | 3 | – | 5 | – | 1 |
| Hawaii | | – | | 4 | – | 7 | – | 0 |
| Loyola (CA) | | – | | 3 | – | 6 | – | 0 |
| San Jose State | | – | | 2 | – | 7 | – | 1 |
| Cal Poly San Dimas | | – | | 1 | – | 6 | – | 0 |
Rankings from AP Poll

The 1951 Cal Poly San Dimas Broncos football team represented the Cal Poly Kellogg-Voorhis Unit—now known as California State Polytechnic University, Pomona—as an independent during the 1951 college football season. Led by Don Rees in his first and only season as head coach, Cal Poly San Dimas compiled a record of 1–6. The team was outscored by its opponents 244 to 21 the season and was shut out in four of the seven games.

== Schedule ==
| Date | Opponent | Site | Result | Source |
|---|---|---|---|---|
| September 29 | at Ventura | Ventura, CA | L 0–47 | |
| October 5 | Palomar | San Dimas, CA | W 7–6 | |
| October 11 | at San Bernardino | San Bernardino, CA | L 0–67 | |
| October 19 | Cal Poly JV | San Dimas, CA | L 8–19 | |
| October 27 | at La Verne | Bonita High School; La Verne, CA | L 0–45 | |
| November 3 | at Humboldt State | Redwood Bowl; Arcata, CA | L 0–33 | |
| November 10 | at Citrus | Glendora, CA | L 6–27 | |
