= 1951 Humboldt State Lumberjacks football team =

American college football season

1951 Humboldt State Lumberjacks football
- Conference: Far Western Conference
- Record: 4–3–1 (2–1 FWC)
- Head coach: Phil Sarboe (1st season)
- Home stadium: Redwood Bowl

1951 Far Western Conference football standings
| | Conf. | | | | | Overall |
| Team | W | | L | | T | W | | L | | T |
|---|---|---|---|---|---|---|---|---|---|---|
| Cal Aggies $ | 3 | – | 1 | – | 0 | 5 | – | 4 | – | 0 |
| San Francisco State | 2 | – | 0 | – | 0 | 8 | – | 2 | – | 0 |
| Humboldt State | 2 | – | 1 | – | 0 | 4 | – | 3 | – | 1 |
| Southern Oregon | 1 | – | 2 | – | 0 | 1 | – | 8 | – | 0 |
| Chico State | 0 | – | 4 | – | 0 | 0 | – | 7 | – | 0 |
$ – Conference champion

The 1951 Humboldt State Lumberjacks football team represented Humboldt State College—now known as California State Polytechnic University, Humboldt—as a member of the Far Western Conference (FWC) during the 1951 college football season. Led by first-year head coach Phil Sarboe, the Lumberjacks compiled an overall record of 4–3–1 with a mark of 2–1 in conference play, placing third in the FWC, and outscored their opponents 177 to 98 for the season. The team played home games at the Redwood Bowl in Arcata, California.

Under Sarboe, the 1951 season was a big turnaround for Humboldt State. The team finished above .500, after not winning a game in either of the previous two seasons. Sarboe coach the Lumberjacks for the next 15 years and had only one losing season.

== Schedule ==
| Date | Time | Opponent | Site | Result | Source |
|---|---|---|---|---|---|
| September 15 | | Oregon Tech* | Redwood Bowl; Arcata, CA | W 19–12 | |
| September 24 | | Linfield* | Redwood Bowl; Arcata, CA | T 20–20 | |
| October 6 | 8:00 p.m. | at Chico State | Costar Field; Chico, CA | W 36–0 | |
| October 13 | | Cal Aggies | Redwood Bowl; Arcata, CA | L 13–27 | |
| October 20 | | Eastern New Mexico* | Redwood Bowl; Arcata, CA | L 6–19 | |
| October 29 | | Oregon JV* | Redwood Bowl; Arcata, CA | L 13–14 | |
| November 3 | | Cal Poly San Dimas* | Redwood Bowl; Arcata, CA | W 33–0 | |
| November 10 | | at Southern Oregon | Walter E. Phillips Field?; Ashland, OR | W 37–6 | |
*Non-conference game; All times are in Pacific time
