= Ralph Thomas (American football) =

American football player (1929–2024)

No. 85, 87
- Positions: End, defensive end

Personal information
- Born: December 6, 1927; Kenosha, Wisconsin, U.S.
- Died: July 22, 2024 (aged 96); Nevada, U.S.
- Listed height: 5 ft 11 in (1.80 m)
- Listed weight: 190 lb (86 kg)

Career information
- High school: St. Catherine's (Racine, Wisconsin)
- College: San Francisco
- NFL draft: 1952: undrafted

Career history
- Chicago Cardinals (1952); Washington Redskins (1955–1956)

Career NFL statistics
- Receptions: 9
- Receiving yards: 105
- Receiving touchdowns: 2
- Stats at Pro Football Reference

Ralph Werner Thomas (December 16, 1929 – July 22, 2024) was an American professional football end in the National Football League for the Washington Redskins and the Chicago Cardinals.

== Biography ==
Thomas graduated from St. Catherine's High School (Racine, Wisconsin) Class of 1947. After high school, he played for the Racine Raiders. He attended the University of San Francisco from 1948 to 1951 and was a member of the 1951 San Francisco Dons football team. In 1955, while playing for the Redskins, he set the unofficial record for fastest consecutive TD at 0:02.7 seconds. He was featured in the 2014 documentary '51 Dons. Thomas died on July 22, 2024, at the age of 94.

== Awards and honors ==
- 1979 University of San Francisco Athletic Hall of Fame
- 2000 St. Catherine's High School Alumni Hall of Fame
