= Red Stephens =

American football player (1930–2003)

No. 67
- Position: Guard

Personal information
- Born: May 10, 1930; Denver, Colorado, U.S.
- Died: April 6, 2003 (aged 72); Placitas, New Mexico, U.S.
- Listed height: 6 ft 0 in (1.83 m)
- Listed weight: 230 lb (104 kg)

Career information
- High school: St. Joseph Notre Dame (Alameda, California)
- College: San Francisco
- NFL draft: 1952: 23rd round, 267th overall pick

Career history
- Washington Redskins (1955–1960); Minnesota Vikings (1961)*
- * Offseason or practice squad member only

Career NFL statistics
- Games played: 70
- Games started: 64
- Fumble recoveries: 1
- Stats at Pro Football Reference

Louis "Red" Edmund Stephens (May 10, 1930 – April 6, 2003) was an American professional football offensive lineman in the National Football League (NFL) for the Washington Redskins. He was a member of the famous 1951 San Francisco Dons who went undefeated (9–0) but were denied an invitation to the Orange Bowl because they insisted on including their two African-American star players: Ollie Matson and Burl Toler. The squad had ten future NFL players, five future NFL Pro-Bowlers, and three future NFL Hall of Famers – a record for a single college team.

Drafted in the 23rd round (267th pick) by the Chicago Cardinals in 1952, he started for the Washington Redskins from 1955 through 1960. He was given the game ball against the Green Bay Packers, Oct. 19th, 1958. Other honors included: 1955 – Associated Press: 2nd Team All-NFL at Right Guard; and 1956 – Sporting News: 1st Team All-NFL at Left Guard. In 1970, he was inducted into the University of San Francisco's Hall of Fame for football.

After his professional football career, he was an assistant coach for the University of Notre Dame from 1960 to 1963. He was then a scout for the Philadelphia Eagles 1963–1966.
