= 1951 Loyola Lions football team =

American college football season

1951 Loyola Lions football
- Conference: Independent
- Record: 3–6
- Head coach: Jordan Olivar (3rd season)
- Home stadium: Rose Bowl

1951 Western college football independents records
	Conf.			Overall
Team	W	L	T	W		L		T
No. 14 San Francisco		–		9	–	0	–	0
La Verne		–		5	–	3	–	0
Pacific (CA)		–		6	–	5	–	0
Fresno State		–		5	–	5	–	0
Santa Clara		–		3	–	5	–	1
Hawaii		–		4	–	7	–	0
Loyola (CA)		–		3	–	6	–	0
San Jose State		–		2	–	7	–	1
Cal Poly San Dimas		–		1	–	6	–	0
Rankings from AP Poll

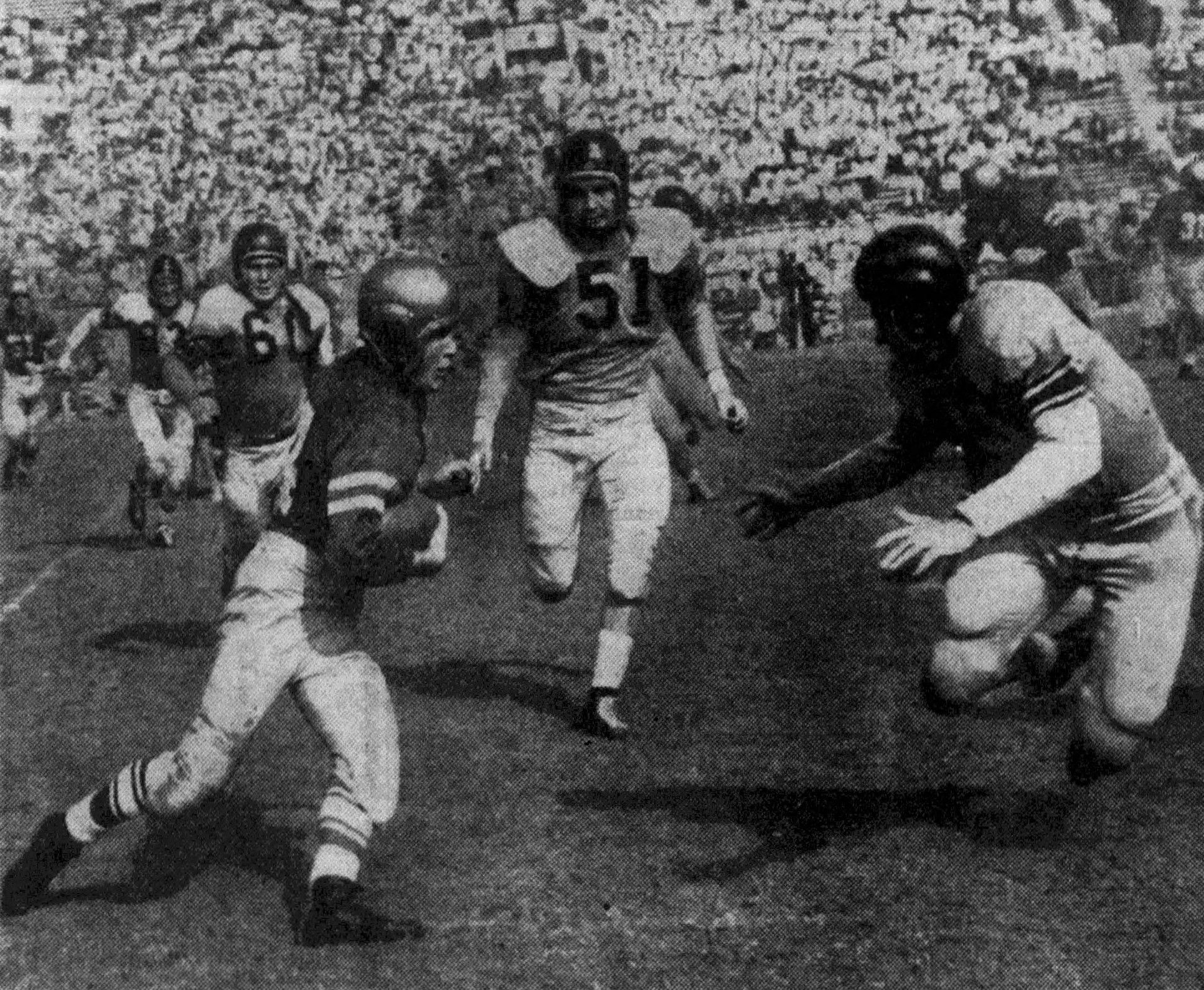
Loyola Lions player Bob Burton (left) rushes the ball as San Diego Navy defender Earl Stelle (far right) closes in for the tackle during a game on September 23, 1951 at the Rose Bowl in Pasadena, California, USA.

The 1951 Loyola Lions football team was an American football team that represented Loyola University of Los Angeles (now known as Loyola Marymount University) as an independent during the 1951 college football season. In their third season under head coach Jordan Olivar, the Lions compiled a 3–6 record and were outscored by a total of 229 to 180.

Loyola was ranked at No. 96 in the 1951 Litkenhous Ratings.

== Schedule ==
Date	Opponent	Site	Result	Attendance	Source
September 23	San Diego Navy	Rose Bowl; Pasadena, CA	L 28–42	9,572	
September 29	at Pacific (CA)	Pacific Memorial Stadium; Stockton, CA	L 28–41	24,000	
October 6	Florida	Rose Bowl; Pasadena, CA	L 7–40	15,350	
October 14	at Santa Clara	Kezar Stadium; San Francisco	L 16–20	10,000	
October 26	at San Jose State	Spartan Stadium; San Jose, CA	W 13–12	7,500	
November 3	Pepperdine	Rose Bowl; Pasadena, CA	W 46–7	6,200	
November 10	at Kansas	Memorial Stadium; Lawrence, KS	L 26–34	18,000	
November 17	Hardin–Simmons	Rose Bowl; Pasadena, CA	W 14–13	9,500	
November 25	No. 13 San Francisco	Rose Bowl; Pasadena, CA	L 2–20	15,750	
Rankings from AP Poll released prior to the game

== Discontinuation of the program ==
On December 30, 1951, one month after the season ended, Loyola's president, the Rev. Charles S. Casassa, SJ, announced that the school was discontinuing its intercollegiate football program. The announcement shocked coaches, students, and alumni at the school.

Loyola's president attributed the decision to the loss of several hundred students resulting from the Korean War which began in June 1950. The Los Angeles Times wrote that other likely factors influencing Loyola's decision included concerns about overemphasis on football, rising costs, heightened competition for players, the platoon system with its demand for a greater number of players, the lack of a suitable home field, and difficulty in scheduling games with popular teams such as UCLA and USC.

Other independent Catholic schools on the West Coast also discontinued their programs during this time period. Saint Mary's College of California disbanded its program after the 1950 season, and the University of San Francisco made its announcement on the same day as Loyola.
