= Willard Harrell =

American football player (born 1952)

No. 40, 39
- Positions: Running back, return specialist

Personal information
- Born: September 16, 1952 (age 74); Stockton, California, U.S.
- Listed height: 5 ft 8 in (1.73 m)
- Listed weight: 162 lb (73 kg)

Career information
- High school: Edison (Stockton)
- College: Pacific (1971–1974)
- NFL draft: 1975: 3rd round, 58th overall pick

Career history
- Green Bay Packers (1975–1977); St. Louis Cardinals (1978–1984)

Awards and highlights
- Second-team All-American (1974); Second-team All-Coast (1973); Pacific Tigers No. 39 retired

Career NFL statistics
- Rushing yards: 1,378
- Rushing average: 3.2
- Rushing touchdowns: 10
- Receptions: 127
- Receiving yards: 1,135
- Receiving touchdowns: 4
- Return yards: 2,775
- Return touchdowns: 2
- Stats at Pro Football Reference

Willard Harrell (born September 16, 1952) is an American former professional football player who was a running back and return specialist in the National Football League (NFL) for three seasons with the Green Bay Packers and seven years with the St. Louis Cardinals. He played college football for the Pacific Tigers and was selected by the Packers in the third round (58th overall) of the 1975 NFL draft.

== Early life ==
He went to Edison High School, Stockton, California, in the late 1960s and early 1970s and played under its legendary coach, Charlie Washington.

== College career ==
Harrell attended the University of the Pacific in Stockton, California. Known for his speed, San Diego State University head football coach Claude Gilbert said of Harrell, "When he's even, he's leavin'". He was named the co- MVP of the 1974 East-West Shrine Game, the first in the annual series to be held at Stanford Stadium. Pacific retired his number, 39, in May, 1986. This was the year after he announced his retirement from the NFL. As of 2021, he is one of only four Pacific football players to have his number retired. The others are Eddie LeBaron, Dick Bass and Eddie Macon.

== Professional career ==
Harrell was a third round draft pick of the Green Bay Packers in 1975, the 58th selection overall. Since the AFL-NFL merger in 1970, this remains, as of 2020, the highest draft position for a player from Pacific. He was drafted by and played for head coach Bart Starr, serving the team as a running back and kick returner for three seasons. During his rookie season of 1975, he led the Packers in punt returns (6.5 avg.), was the team's second-leading rusher (359 yards, 1 touchdown) and receiver (34 catches, 261 yards, 2 touchdowns), and threw three touchdown passes in just five attempts. He also led the team in rushing during the 1976 season with 435 yards in 130 attempts with three touchdowns. Harrell played in a total of 40 regular-season games for the Packers.

His last seven seasons in the NFL were spent with the St. Louis Cardinals. While playing for the Cardinals, he was the subject of a feature which aired on CBS Sports' pregame show, The NFL Today. The segment, "The Barber of St. Louis", discussed how he enjoyed cutting hair and provided barber service to some of his teammates and coaches. It used instrumental music from "The Barber of Seville" in the background.

Harrell announced his retirement from the NFL in mid-August 1985. Cardinals head coach Jim Hanifan said of Harrell that he was "one of the smallest men to play in the National Football League in size and certainly one of the biggest in heart, desire and intelligence." The Big Red Zone blog, dedicated to the history of the St. Louis football Cardinals, lists Harrell as the #81 St. Louis Cardinals football player of all time.

== Personal life ==
Willard Harrell was born in Stockton, California and currently resides in Lake St. Louis, Missouri, where he owns a State Farm Insurance office. He is married to a schoolteacher.
