= 1951 Cal Poly Mustangs football team =

American college football season

1951 Cal Poly Mustangs football
- Conference: California Collegiate Athletic Association
- Record: 5–4–1 (2–1–1 CCAA)
- Head coach: LeRoy Hughes (2nd season)
- Home stadium: Mustang Stadium

1951 California Collegiate Athletic Association football standings
	Conf.					Overall
Team	W		L		T	W		L		T
San Diego State $	4	–	0	–	0	10	–	0	–	1
Cal Poly	2	–	1	–	1	5	–	4	–	1
Pepperdine	2	–	1	–	1	5	–	4	–	1
Santa Barbara	1	–	3	–	0	5	–	4	–	0
Los Angeles State	0	–	4	–	0	1	–	7	–	0
$ – Conference champion

The 1951 Cal Poly Mustangs football team represented California Polytechnic State College—now known as California Polytechnic State University, San Luis Obispo—as a member of the California Collegiate Athletic Association (CCAA) during the 1951 college football season. Led by second-year head coach LeRoy Hughes, Cal Poly compiled an overall record of 5–4–1 with a mark of 2–1–1 in conference play, tying for second place in the CCAA. The Mustangs played home games at Mustang Stadium in San Luis Obispo, California.

== Schedule ==
Date	Time	Opponent	Site	Result	Attendance	Source
September 22		Sul Ross*	Mustang Stadium; San Luis Obispo, CA	L 24–47		
September 29		Southern Oregon*	Mustang Stadium; San Luis Obispo, CA	W 39–0		
October 6		at San Diego State	Aztec Bowl; San Diego, CA	L 13–32	8,500	
October 13		Los Angeles State	Mustang Stadium; San Luis Obispo, CA	W 21–0		
October 20		at Fresno State*	Ratcliffe Stadium; Fresno, CA	L 19–42		
October 26		at Pepperdine	El Camino Stadium; Torrance, CA	T 7–7		
November 3	8:00 p.m.	at Chico State*	Costar Field; Chico, CA	W 19–0	1,000	
November 10		Santa Barbara	Mustang Stadium; San Luis Obispo, CA	W 14–7		
November 17		Caltech*	Mustang Stadium; San Luis Obispo, CA	W 42–7		
November 22		at Missouri Valley*	Gregg-Mitchell Field; Marshall, MO	L 7–14		
*Non-conference game; All times are in Pacific time
