= 1951 San Francisco State Gators football team =

American college football season

1951 San Francisco State Gators football
- Conference: Far Western Conference
- Record: 8–2 (2–0 FWC)
- Head coach: Joe Verducci (2nd season)
- Home stadium: Cox Stadium

1951 Far Western Conference football standings
	Conf.					Overall
Team	W		L		T	W		L		T
Cal Aggies $	3	–	1	–	0	5	–	4	–	0
San Francisco State	2	–	0	–	0	8	–	2	–	0
Humboldt State	2	–	1	–	0	4	–	3	–	1
Southern Oregon	1	–	2	–	0	1	–	8	–	0
Chico State	0	–	4	–	0	0	–	7	–	0
$ – Conference champion

The 1951 San Francisco State Gators football team represented San Francisco State College—now known as San Francisco State University—as a member of the Far Western Conference (FWC) during the 1951 college football season. Led by second-year head coach Joe Verducci, San Francisco State compiled an overall record of 8–2 with a mark of 2–0 in conference play, placing second in the FWC. For the season, the team was outscored by its opponents 246 to 167. The Gators played home games at Cox Stadium in San Francisco.

== Schedule ==
Date	Time	Opponent	Site	Result	Attendance	Source
September 15		at Lewis & Clark*	Portland, OR	W 40–34		
September 21		San Diego State*	Cox Stadium; San Francisco, CA	L 14–32	8,000	
September 29		at Whittier*	Hadley Field; Whittier, CA	W 26–6		
October 5		Los Angeles State*	Cox Stadium; San Francisco, CA	W 37–13		
October 13	8:00 p.m.	at Chico State	Costar Field; Chico, CA	W 25–6	1,000	
October 20		College of Idaho*	Cox Stadium; San Francisco, CA	L 19–45		
November 2		Naval Air Station Alameda (Note: Naval Air Station Alameda was a Naval Air Station from 1940 to 1997. For many years they fielded a team that played against colleges and other military teams.)*	Cox Stadium; San Francisco, CA	W 21–12		
November 9		La Verne*	Cox Stadium; San Francisco, CA	W 19–0		
November 16		Cal Aggies	Cox Stadium; San Francisco, CA	W 25–12		
November 24		at Fresno State*	Ratcliffe Stadium; Fresno, CA	W 20–7	5,433	
*Non-conference game; All times are in Pacific time

== Team players in the NFL ==
No San Francisco State players were selected in the 1952 NFL draft.

The following finished their college career in 1951, were not drafted, but played in the NFL.

Player	Position	First NFL team
Al Endress	Defensive end, end	1952 San Francisco 49ers
