= 1951 Pacific Tigers football team =

American college football season

1951 Pacific Tigers football

Sun Bowl, L 14–25 vs Texas Tech
- Conference: Independent
- Record: 6–5
- Head coach: Ernie Jorge (1st season)
- Home stadium: Pacific Memorial Stadium

1951 Western college football independents records
	Conf.			Overall
Team	W	L	T	W		L		T
No. 14 San Francisco		–		9	–	0	–	0
La Verne		–		5	–	3	–	0
Pacific (CA)		–		6	–	5	–	0
Fresno State		–		5	–	5	–	0
Santa Clara		–		3	–	5	–	1
Hawaii		–		4	–	7	–	0
Loyola (CA)		–		3	–	6	–	0
San Jose State		–		2	–	7	–	1
Cal Poly San Dimas		–		1	–	6	–	0
Rankings from AP Poll

The 1951 Pacific Tigers football team represented the College of the Pacific (Note: University of the Pacific (UOP) was known as College of the Pacific from 1911 to 1961.) during the 1951 college football season. Pacific played home games in Pacific Memorial Stadium (Note: Amos Alonzo Stagg Memorial Stadium was known as Pacific Memorial Stadium from its opening in 1950 through 1987.) in Stockton, California.

Pacific competed as an independent in 1951. In their first season under head coach Ernie Jorge, the Tigers finished the regular season with a record of six wins and four losses (6–4) and were ranked as high as #16 during the season. At the end of the season, Pacific was invited to a New Years Day bowl game for the second time in their history (also at the end of the 1946 season). On January 1, 1952, they played Texas Tech in the Sun Bowl, losing 25–14. That brought their record to six wins and five losses (6–5). For the season they outscored their opponents 275–216.

== Schedule ==
Date	Opponent	Rank	Site	Result	Attendance	Source
September 22	Hardin–Simmons		Pacific Memorial Stadium; Stockton, CA	W 33–7	19,134	
September 29	Loyola (CA)		Pacific Memorial Stadium; Stockton, CA	W 41–28	24,000	
October 6	Oregon		Pacific Memorial Stadium; Stockton, CA	W 34–6		
October 13	No. 16 Clemson	No. 20	Pacific Memorial Stadium; Stockton, CA	W 21–7		
October 19	at Boston University	No. 16	Fenway Park; Boston, MA	L 12–27		
October 27	North Texas State		Pacific Memorial Stadium; Stockton, CA	W 34–0	13,100	
November 2	at Marquette		Marquette Stadium; Milwaukee, WI	W 39–27		
November 10	Denver	No. 19	Pacific Memorial Stadium; Stockton, CA	L 33–35	10,469	
November 17	No. 14 San Francisco		Pacific Memorial Stadium; Stockton, CA	L 14–47	41,607	
November 23	at San Jose State		Spartan Stadium; San Jose, CA (Victory Bell)	L 0–7		
January 1	vs. Texas Tech		Kidd Field; El Paso, TX (Sun Bowl)	L 14–25	17,000	
Rankings from AP Poll released prior to the game

== Team players in the NFL ==
The following College of the Pacific players were selected in the 1952 NFL draft.

Player	Position	Round	Overall	NFL team
Eddie Macon	Defensive back – Halfback	2	20	Chicago Bears
Keever Jankovich	Linebacker – Defensive end	5	60	Cleveland Browns
Duane Putnam	Guard	6	66	Los Angeles Rams
Burt Delavan	Tackle	7	85	Los Angeles Rams
Tom McCormick	Halfback	8	97	Los Angeles Rams
