= Bill Striegel =

American football player (1936–1992)

No. 68, 75, 72
- Positions: Guard, tackle, linebacker

Personal information
- Born: May 28, 1936; Easton, Kansas, U.S.
- Died: July 23, 1992 (aged 56); San Joaquin County, California, U.S.
- Listed height: 6 ft 2 in (1.88 m)
- Listed weight: 235 lb (107 kg)

Career information
- High school: Chico (CA)
- College: Pacific
- NFL draft: 1958: 8th round, 88th overall pick

Career history
- Philadelphia Eagles (1959); Dallas Cowboys (1960)*; Oakland Raiders (1960); Boston Patriots (1960)
- * Offseason or practice squad member only

Career NFL/AFL statistics
- Games played: 18
- Games started: 2
- Stats at Pro Football Reference

William Joseph Striegel (May 28, 1936 – July 23, 1992) was an American football offensive guard in the National Football League (NFL) for the Philadelphia Eagles. He also was a member of the Oakland Raiders and Boston Patriots in the American Football League (AFL). He played college football at the University of the Pacific.

== Early life ==
Striegel attended Chico Senior High School. He accepted a football scholarship from the University of the Pacific. He became a starter as a two-way tackle.

== Professional career ==
Striegel was selected by the Philadelphia Eagles in the eighth round (88th overall) of the 1958 NFL draft. He suffered an injury in practice with the 1958 College All-Star steam and was lost for the season. On May 9, 1959, he was re-signed by the Eagles and was converted into an offensive guard during training camp. He appeared in 12 games as a backup.

In 1960, Striegel was selected by the Dallas Cowboys in the expansion draft. He was tried at linebacker and defensive end. He was released before the start of the season in September.

On September 19, 1960, he was signed as a free agent by the Oakland Raiders of the American Football League to play as an offensive tackle. He appeared in one game during their inaugural season before being cut in October.

In October 1960, he signed with the Boston Patriots of the American Football League to play as a linebacker. He appeared in 5 games with one start during their inaugural season.

== Personal life ==
In September 1965, he was hired by the expansion franchise Atlanta Falcons to work as a scout.
