= 1951 San Diego State Aztecs football team =

American college football season

1951 San Diego State Aztecs football

CCAA champion

Pineapple Bowl, W 34–13 vs. Hawaii
- Conference: California Collegiate Athletic Association
- Record: 10–0–1 (4–0 CCAA)
- Head coach: Bill Schutte (5th season)
- Home stadium: Aztec Bowl, Balboa Stadium

1951 California Collegiate Athletic Association football standings
| | Conf. | | | | | Overall |
| Team | W | | L | | T | W | | L | | T |
|---|---|---|---|---|---|---|---|---|---|---|
| San Diego State $ | 4 | – | 0 | – | 0 | 10 | – | 0 | – | 1 |
| Cal Poly | 2 | – | 1 | – | 1 | 5 | – | 4 | – | 1 |
| Pepperdine | 2 | – | 1 | – | 1 | 5 | – | 4 | – | 1 |
| Santa Barbara | 1 | – | 3 | – | 0 | 5 | – | 4 | – | 0 |
| Los Angeles State | 0 | – | 4 | – | 0 | 1 | – | 7 | – | 0 |
$ – Conference champion

The 1951 San Diego State Aztecs football team represented San Diego State College (Note: San Diego State University was known as San Diego State College from 1935 to 1971.) during the 1951 college football season.

San Diego State competed in the California Collegiate Athletic Association (CCAA). The team was led by fifth-year head coach Bill Schutte, and played home games at both Aztec Bowl and Balboa Stadium. They finished the season undefeated, with ten wins, no losses and one tie (10–0–1, 4–0 CCAA). Overall, the team was dominant in nearly every game, outscoring its opponents 386–133 for the season.

At the end of the regular season, the Aztecs were invited to the Pineapple Bowl in Hawaii. On January 1, 1952, they defeated the Hawaii Rainbows, 34–13.

== Schedule ==
| Date | Opponent | Site | Result | Attendance | Source |
|---|---|---|---|---|---|
| September 21 | at San Francisco State* | Cox Stadium; San Francisco, CA | W 32–14 | 8,000 | |
| September 29 | Submarines Pacific (CA)* | Aztec Bowl; San Diego, CA | W 37–21 | 10,000 | |
| October 6 | Cal Poly | Aztec Bowl; San Diego, CA | W 32–13 | 8,500 | |
| October 13 | San Diego Marines (Note: The Marine Corps Recruit Depot (MCRD) in San Diego fielded a team that played against colleges and other military teams from 1922 to 1964.)* | Balboa Stadium; San Diego, CA | W 34–18 | 18,000 | |
| October 20 | Arizona State*^{†} | Aztec Bowl; San Diego, CA | T 27–27 | 12,500 | |
| October 27 | Los Angeles State | Aztec Bowl; San Diego, CA | W 64–0 | 6,000 | |
| November 3 | at Fresno State* | Ratcliffe Stadium; Fresno, CA (rivalry) | W 13–7 | 8,121 | |
| November 10 | at Redlands* | Redlands Stadium (Note: This stadium is the predecessor to the current Ted Runner Stadium on the University of Redlands campus, which was opened for the 1968 season); Redlands, CA | W 46–14 | 2,000 | |
| November 16 | at Pepperdine | El Camino Stadium; Torrance, CA | W 27–6 | | |
| November 22 | Santa Barbara | Aztec Bowl; San Diego, CA | W 40–0 | 7,000 | |
| January 1 | at Hawaii* | Honolulu Stadium; Honolulu, HI (Pineapple Bowl) | W 34–13 | 11,000 | |
*Non-conference game; ^{†}Homecoming

== Team players in the NFL ==
The following San Diego State players were selected in the 1952 NFL draft.

| Player | Position | Round | Overall | NFL team |
| Skeets Quinlan | Halfback | 4 | 49 | Los Angeles Rams |
| Art Preston | Back | 21 | 253 | Los Angeles Rams |
