= '51 Dons =

- Film poster
- Written by: Tom Davis; Danny Llewelyn; Ron Luscinski
- Directed by: Ron Luscinski
- Narrated by: Johnny Mathis
- Music by: Tom Hiel
- Country of origin: United States
- Original language: English

Production
- Producers: Danny Llewelyn; Tom Davis; Ron Luscinski; Bob Dussault
- Cinematography: Steven Douglas Smith
- Editor: Teddy Gersten
- Running time: 60 minutes
- Production company: '51 Dons Productions

Original release
- Network: ESPN
- Release: February 9, 2014

'51 Dons is a 2014 American documentary film directed by Ron Luscinski and written by Luscinski, Tom Davis and Danny Llewelyn. Narrated by Johnny Mathis, it covers the 1951 San Francisco Dons football team and its unique stand against racism. The team, including future NFL players and Pro Football Hall of Fame inductees Bob St. Clair and Gino Marchetti, declined an invitation to play in the Orange Bowl that would have required them to leave their African-American players Ollie Matson and Burl Toler home. This act was one of the contributing factors that led to the end of organized football at the University of San Francisco. The university's athletic news director, Pete Rozelle, went on to become the commissioner of the NFL, where he reshaped American football.

== Synopsis ==
In 1951, future Pro Football Hall of Famers Gino Marchetti, Bob St. Clair and Ollie Matson powered the University of San Francisco Dons to a 9–0 record. As one of the nation's top teams, USF seemed assured of their first-ever bowl bid and a payout that would save their cash-strapped program. The Dons were invited to Miami under one condition: They take the field without their two African American stars, Matson and Burl Toler. The Dons refused. By choosing not to play, they set a precedent of racial equality more than a decade before the Civil Rights Movement. The Dons' stand against racism is recognized by contemporary African-American studies scholars Dr. Harry Edwards and Martin Luther King Jr.'s speech writer, Dr. Clarence Benjamin Jones, as evidence of sports acting as an engine for social justice in America. Both men state this case in the film.

== Production ==
Filming began in late 2013. There were over 40 interviews filmed. Filming locations included in and around the University of San Francisco campus, Kezar Stadium, California Memorial Stadium on the Cal Berkeley campus, Carmel-by-the-sea and the Greater Los Angeles area.

The surviving members of the 1951 Dons team who appear on camera include Bob St. Clair, Ralph Thomas (American football), Dick Columbini and Bill Henneberry. Several former NFL stars such as Rosey Grier, Gene Washington, Jamie Williams and Toi Cook are featured as well. In addition, many of Matson and Toler's children and grandchildren appear.

This is the only film Johnny Mathis has chosen to narrate. Mathis has personal ties to the story, as he was a close friend of Ollie Matson while a track athlete at San Francisco's Washington High. Mathis later sang at Matson's wedding.

== Reception ==
'51 Dons premiered on ESPN on Sunday, February 9, 2014, in primetime to a strong critical reaction. It subsequently aired 12 times nationally in the U.S. on ESPN Networks and three times throughout Canada on TSN. To date, the film has been seen by over one million viewers.

ESPN senior director, programming & acquisitions, Doug White said, "ESPN is proud to have '51 Dons as part of our annual Black History Month programming. The film displays the team's solidarity as they support two of their own, forgoing an opportunity to play in a bowl game and the monetary value of a championship."

== See also ==
- List of American football films
