= Gerry Conlee =

American football player (1914–2005)

Profile
- Position: Center

Personal information
- Born: August 22, 1914; Porterville, California, U.S.
- Died: July 16, 2005 (aged 90); El Cajon, California, U.S.
- Listed height: 5 ft 11 in (1.80 m)
- Listed weight: 203 lb (92 kg)

Career information
- High school: Chico (CA)
- College: St. Mary's

Career history
- Cleveland Rams (1938); Detroit Lions (1943); San Francisco 49ers (1946-1947)
- Stats at Pro Football Reference

Gerald Russell Conlee (August 22, 1914 – July 15, 2005) was an American football center.

Conlee was born in Porterville, California, in 1914 and attended Chico High School in Chico, California. He played college football at St. Mary's from 1934 to 1936.

He played professional football in the National Football League (NFL) for the Cleveland Rams in 1938 and the Detroit Lions in 1943 and in the All-America Football Conference (AAFC) for the San Francisco 49ers from 1946 to 1947. He appeared in 41 professional football games, seven of them as a starter.

He died in 2005 in El Cajon, California.
