= 1952 Sun Bowl =

American college football game

Pacific Tigers	Texas Tech Red Raiders
(6–4)	(6–4)
Independent	Border Conference
14	25
Head coach: Ernie Jorge	Head coach: DeWitt Weaver
	1	2	3	4	Total
Pacific	7	7	0	0	14
Texas Tech	13	6	6	0	25
- Date: January 1, 1952
- Season: 1951
- Stadium: Kidd Field
- Location: Sun Bowl
- MVP: QB Junior Arteburn (Texas Tech)
- Attendance: 17,000

The 1952 Sun Bowl was a college football postseason bowl game that featured the Texas Tech Red Raiders and the Pacific Tigers.

== Background ==
In Coach Weaver's first season, the Red Raiders had won the Border Conference title, their fourth in five seasons. This was their first bowl appearance since 1949 and first Sun Bowl since 1948. The Tigers had been ranked three times during the season (as high as 16th at one point), but a loss to Denver started a four-game losing streak that derailed a 6-1 start. This was their first bowl appearance since 1948.

== Game summary ==
Jim Turner scored on a 39-yard touchdown run to give Tech an early 7-0 lead. Pacific responded with a touchdown of their own to tie it at 7. Lewis Crossley culminated a six-play drive on his touchdown pass to Jerry Johnson from 19 yards out to make it 13-7. Junior Arterburn made it 19-7 on a five-yard touchdown run on Tech's next drive. Pacific scored on a Johnny Cobb touchdown run that culminated a nine-play drive to make it 19-14 at halftime. Charles Welton scored from 11 yards out to make it 25-14 midway through the third. From that point, neither team reached the red zone again. Eddie Macon became the first African American to play in the Sun Bowl, contributing with 60 yards on 6 carries.

== Statistics ==
Statistics	Texas Tech	Pacific
First downs	12	18
Rushing yards	274	278
Passing yards	79	38
Total offense	353	316
Passing	5–9–0	4–14–3
Fumbles–lost	2–0	5–4
Penalties–yards	12–90	3–25
Punts–average	5–41.0	3–32.0

== Aftermath ==
This remains the only Sun Bowl victory for Texas Tech and this was their only bowl victory inside the state of Texas until 2003. Pacific returned to the Sun Bowl the following year and won. Texas Tech has appeared in the most Sun Bowls with 9, but this remains their only win. The Red Raiders are 1-8 all time in the Sun Bowl.
