= 1946 San Francisco Junior College Rams football team =

American college football season

1946 City College of San Francisco Rams football

NCJCC champion
- Conference: Northern California Junior College Conference
- Record: 8–1 (7–0 NCJCC)
- Head coach: Grover Klemmer (or Lee Eisan) (1st season)
- Home stadium: Kezar Stadium; George Washington High School field Balboa High School field

1946 Northern California Junior College Conference football standings
	Conf.					Overall
Team	W		L		T	W		L		T
San Francisco JC $	7	–	0	–	0	8	–	1	–	0
San Mateo	3	–	3	–	1	?	–	?	–	?
Sacramento	3	–	4	–	0	?	–	?	–	?
Modesto	2	–	4	–	1	?	–	?	–	?
Salinas	0	–	4	–	0	?	–	?	–	?
$ – Conference champion

The 1946 San Francisco Junior College Rams football team was an American football team that represented San Francisco Junior College (SFJC), now known as City College of San Francisco (CCSF), as a member of the Northern California Junior College Conference (NCJCC) during the 1946 junior college football season. In their first year under head coach Grover Klemmer, the Rams compiled an 8–1 record and won the NCJCC championship. Despite an early season loss to Long Beach City College, CCSF claims the season as the first of 11 a junior college national championship for its football program.

Tackle Art Psaltis was a unanimous selection as a first-team player on the 1946 all-NCJCC football team. Five others won first-team honors: fullback Marshall Leong; end Ray Poznekoff; halfback Art Ekdall; tackle Glen Smith; and guard Denny Miller. Four others received second-team honors: back Staten Webster; end Jim Cronn; guard Stan Belcher; and center John Didio.

== Schedule ==
Date	Time	Opponent	Site	Result	Attendance	Source
September 27		Long Beach City*	Kezar Stadium; San Francisco, CA	L 6–13		
October 4		Salinas	George Washington High School field; San Francisco, CA	W 12–0		
October 11		at Sacramento	Sacramento, CA	W 13–6		
October 19		at Modesto	Modesto Junior College Stadium; Modesto, CA	W 14–0		
October 25		San Mateo	Balboa High School field; San Francisco, CA	W 35–18	2,500	
November 2	8:00 p.m.	at Los Angeles City*	Gilmore Stadium; Los Angeles, CA	W		
November 8		Modesto	Balboa High School Field; San Francisco, CA	W 38–7	1,500	
November 22	2:15 p.m.	Sacramento	Balboa High School field; San Francisco, CA (Mud Bowl)	W 12–0		
November 30		at San Mateo	McConville Field; San Mateo, CA	W 20–13	4,500–5,000	
*Non-conference game; All times are in Pacific time
