= Pacific Tigers football =

American college football team

- First season: 1895; 131 years ago
- Last season: 1995; 31 years ago
- Athletic director: Bob Lee
- Head coach: Chuck Shelton
- Location: Stockton, California
- Stadium: Stagg Memorial Stadium (capacity: 28,000)
- NCAA division: Division I-A
- Conference: Big West Conference
- Colors: Black and orange
- All-time record: 346–403–24 (.463)
- Bowl record: 3–2–1 (.583)

Conference championships
- 7 (1 CCC, 5 FWC, 1 CCAA)
- Rivalries: San Jose State (Victory Bell); Fresno State; Santa Clara; Sacramento State
- Fight song: Tiger Fight Song ("Hungry Tigers")
- Mascot: Powercat

The Pacific Tigers football team represented the University of the Pacific in NCAA Division I-A (now FBS) college football. The team competed in the Big West Conference during their last season in 1995. They played their home games at Stagg Memorial Stadium in Stockton, California. On December 19, 1995, the Board of Regents voted to disband the team in order to save money for the athletic program, which was reported to have gone over $400,000 in debt. All scholarships were honored for current players of the team.

== History ==
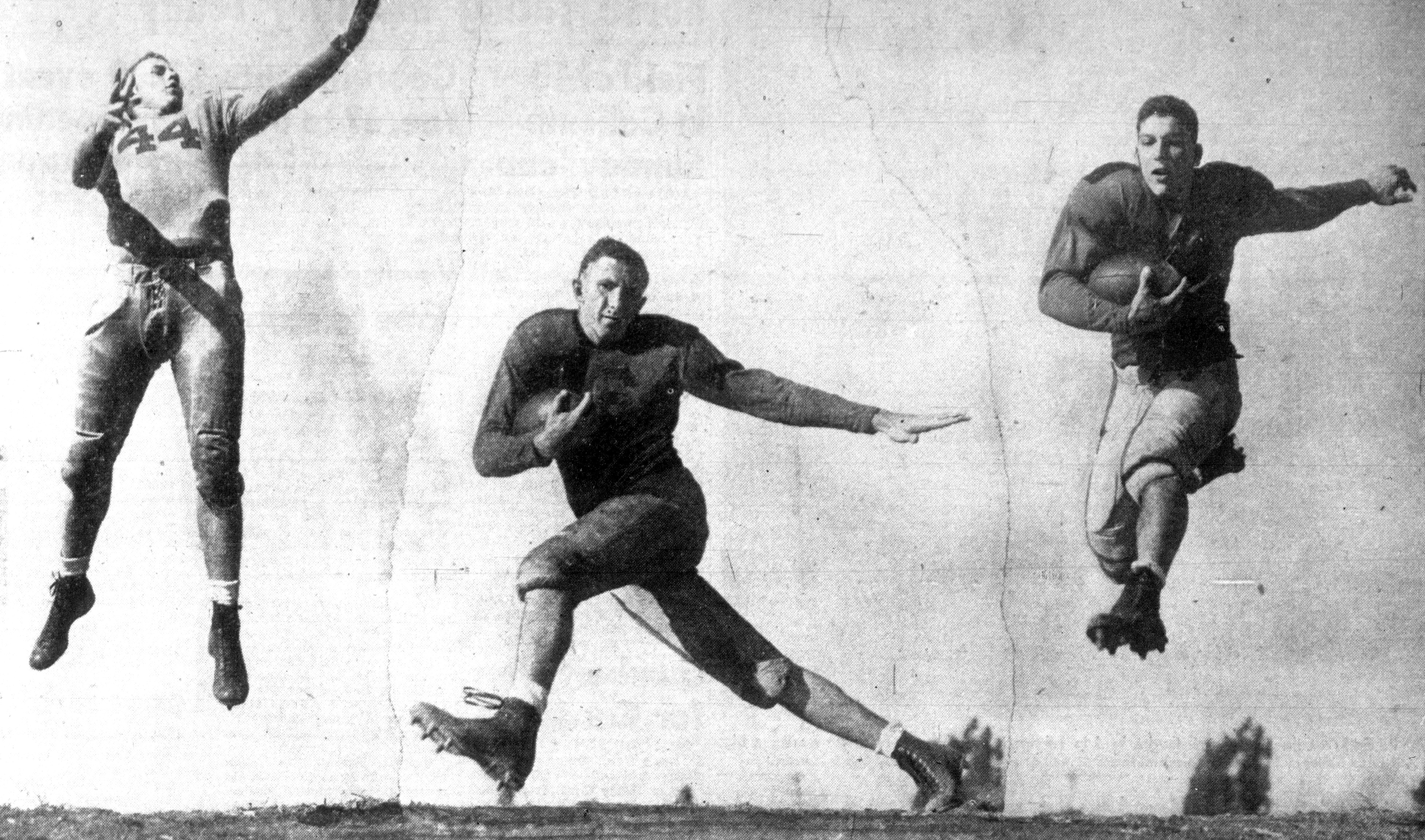
Tigers football players in 1943

The 1943 Pacific Tigers football team was an independent during the 1943 college football season. In their 11th season under head coach Amos Alonzo Stagg, the Tigers compiled a record of 7–2 and finished the season ranked No. 19 in the AP poll. The Tigers played home games at Baxter Stadium in Stockton. The Tigers beat a strong UCLA Bruins team, the No. 20 ranked Cal Bears and No. 10 ranked Saint Mary's Gaels. This led the 1943 Tigers defensive line to be rated the strongest in the west. The team was at one time ranked No. 6 in the nation by the Associated Press. The 1943 team produced Pacific's 1st All-Americans in tackle Al McCaffrey and running back John Podesto. Amos Alonzo Stagg was also named "Coach of the Year" by the American Football Coaches Association and the Football Writers Association of America

The 1949 Pacific Tigers football team was an independent during the 1949 college football season. In their third season under head coach Larry Siemering, the Tigers compiled an undefeated and untied 11–0 record, were ranked No. 10 in the final AP poll, and outscored all opponents by a combined total of 575 to 66. The Tigers' victories included wins over Cincinnati, San Diego State, San Jose State, Fresno State, Nevada, Hawaii, and Utah.

Quarterback Eddie LeBaron was selected by both the Associated Press and International News Service as a first-team player on the 1949 All-Pacific Coast football team. Don Campora and Eddie LeBaron were both selected in the following 1950 NFL draft

=== Conference affiliations ===
- 1895–1921: Independent
- 1922–1923: California Coast Conference
- 1924: Independent
- 1925–1942: Far West Conference
- 1943–1945: Independent
- 1946–1948: California Collegiate Athletic Association
- 1949–1968: Independent
- 1969–1995: Pacific Coast Athletic Association / Big West Conference

== Conference championships ==
Season	Conference	Coach	Overall record	Conference record
1923	California Coast	Erwin Righter	7–0–0	4–0
1936	Far West	Amos Stagg	5–4–1	4–0
1938	Far West	Amos Stagg	7–3	4–0
1940	Far West	Amos Stagg	4–5	2–0
1941	Far West	Amos Stagg	4–7	3–0
1942	Far West	Amos Stagg	2–6–1	2–0
1947	California Collegiate	Larry Siemering	10–1	5–0

== Bowl games ==
The Pacific Tigers played in six bowl games total, but only three sanctioned by the National Collegiate Athletic Association (NCAA), with a record of 2–1.

Season	Coach	Bowl	Opponent	Result	Source
1946	Amos Stagg	Optimist Bowl†	North Texas State	L 13–14	
1947	Larry Siemering	Grape Bowl†	Utah State	W 35–21	
1947	Larry Siemering	Raisin Bowl	Wichita	W 26–14	
1948	Larry Siemering	Grape Bowl†	Hardin–Simmons	T 35–35	
1951	Ernie Jorge	Sun Bowl	Texas Tech	L 14–25	
1952	Ernie Jorge	Sun Bowl	Mississippi Southern	W 26–7	

† Not an NCAA-sanctioned bowl game

== Home stadiums ==
Period	Stadium	Location	Capacity
1895–1899	Cyclers' Park	San Jose	n/a
1919–1922	C.O.P. Field	San Jose	n/a
1923–1928	College of the Pacific Field	Stockton	n/a
1929–1949	Baxter Stadium	Stockton	12,000
1948–1949	KJ Stadium Areana (Note: Used only for 3 games.)	Lodi	18,000
1950–1995	Stagg Memorial Stadium (Note: Complete name was "Amos Alonzo Stagg Memorial Stadium".)	Stockton	28,000 (Note: Originally, 35,975.)

=== Stagg Memorial Stadium ===
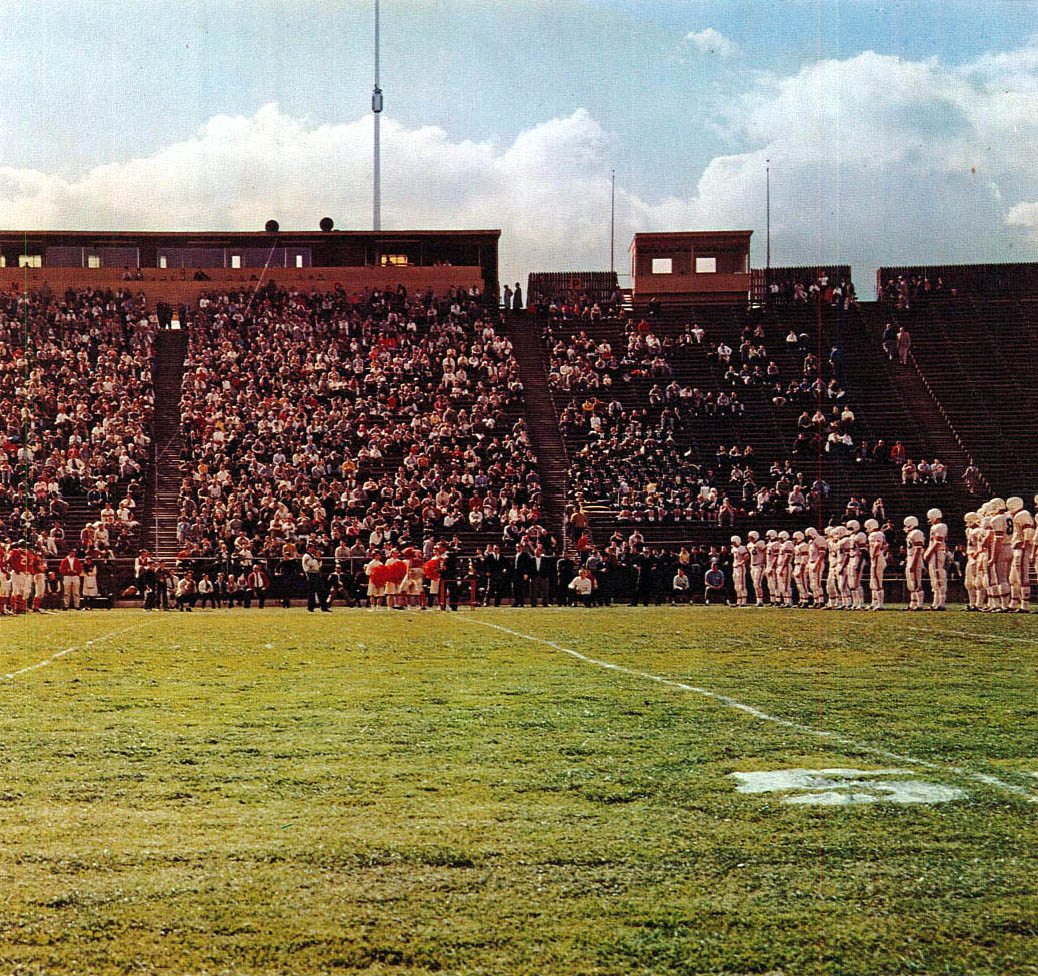
View of the stadium in 1961

Previously known as "Pacific Memorial Stadium", it was a 28,000-seat outdoor stadium located on the campus of the University of the Pacific in Stockton. Constructed in 1950 for football, it was the home venue for the Pacific Tigers football team, and later hosted women's soccer; it was closed in 2012 and demolished two years later.

The stadium originally seated 35,975 with room for expansion to over 44,000, but renovations reduced the capacity to a configuration of 28,000. It was the venue for a 1997 friendly soccer match between Brazil and Honduras; notable striker Ronaldo scored six goals and Brazil won 8–2.

On February 26, 2012, the university announced it would close Stagg Memorial Stadium to conduct a feasibility study to assess needed repairs, upgrades and changes required to make the facility meet modern standards in conjunction with a financial assessment to determine if the stadium could be repaired or if it should be replaced.

In April 2022 the "Stagg Memorial Plaza" was dedicated and open to the public on the grounds of the old stadium. The 9,000 sq. ft. plaza, located off of Larry Heller Drive across from the Alex G. Spanos Center, is "envisioned as a gathering place for alumni and students who will learn of the storied history of Pacific Football through the stories and statues encircling the plaza. The plaza will also serve as a campus destination hosting several tailgates and gatherings annually associated with athletic and campus events."

== Rivalries ==
=== San Jose State ===
The now defunct, nearly 100 year, rivalry match up between the SJSU Spartans and the Pacific Tigers began in January 1896 and ended in 1995 when Pacific dropped its football program. The 'Spartan-Tiger Football Game' was played 72 times between 1896 and 1995.

Due to the "private vs. public" institutional competitiveness and the close geographical proximity of the two schools, a natural "cross-town" rivalry was born. University of the Pacific was founded in 1851 in Santa Clara, California, and claims to be the first institution of higher education in California. San José State University was founded in 1857 and is California's first public institution of higher education.

In 1949, in a game which drew national attention, the Victory Bell was unveiled. The Victory Bell would go to the winner of subsequent Tiger-Spartan games. The bell was two feet tall and waist-high on a rolling cart. The bell was half black with an orange "P" for Pacific and half blue with a gold "SJ" for San Jose.

The Spartans led the series 43–23–6 when the rivalry ended at the close of the 1995 season.

=== Fresno State ===
Fresno State and Pacific first met in 1963 in Stockton, CA with a Bulldogs victory 29-7. Due to the 2 campuses close proximity, within 134 miles, and just over a 2-hour drive straight on California State route 99, bragging rights for the best team in the San Joaquin Valley were at stake when these 2 football programs collided on the gridiron.

At the end of 1995 season when Pacific dropped its football program the Bulldogs won the 25 game series 17-8.

=== Sacramento State ===
Sacramento State and Pacific first met in 1973 in Stockton, CA. Due to the 2 campuses close proximity, within 51 miles, and just under an hour drive straight on I-5 when it was completed in 1979, bragging rights for the best team in the San Joaquin Valley were at stake when these 2 football programs collided on the gridiron.

At the end of 1995 season when Pacific dropped its football program the Tigers led the 20-year series 7-2.

== Final AP Poll rankings ==
Season	Rank
1943	No. 19
1949	No. 10

== National and conference award winners ==
- Pop Warner Trophy

The Glenn "Pop" Warner Memorial Trophy was awarded annually by the Palo Club to the most valuable senior player on the West Coast. It was awarded from 1949 to 2004. Notably, all but 5 recipients played for Pac-8/Pac-10 institutions. The award is distinguished from the unaffiliated W. J. Voit Memorial Trophy, presented annually from 1951 to 1978 to the top player on the Pacific Coast regardless of class-year.

Pop Warner Trophy
Year	Name	Position
1949	Eddie LeBaron	QB

- Eddie LeBaron, was the inaugural Pop Warner Memorial Trophy recipient in 1949.
- National Football Foundation Gold Medal

National Football Foundation Gold Medal
Year	Name	Position
1960	Amos Alonzo Stagg	Head Coach

The National Football Foundation recognizes individuals who demonstrate outstanding support for promoting the game of amateur football. The NFF Gold Medal is the highest award offered by the National Football Foundation.

- AFCA Coach of the Year

AFCA Coach of the Year
Year	Name	Position
1943	Amos Alonzo Stagg	Head Coach

- Football Writers Association of America Coach of the Year

Football Writers Association of America Coach of the Year
Year	Name	Position
1943	Amos Alonzo Stagg	Head Coach

- Corbett Award

Corbett Award
Year	Name	Position
2000	Cedric Dempsey	Athletic Director
2015	Carl Miller	Athletic Director

This honor is awarded annually by the National Association of Collegiate Directors of Athletics (NACDA). It is presented "to the collegiate administrator who has most typified Corbett's devotion to intercollegiate athletics and worked unceasingly for its betterment."

- National Football Foundation National Scholar-Athlete Award

NFF National Scholar-Athlete Award
Year	Name	Position
1979	Bruce Filarsky	DL

== Individual honors ==
=== Retired numbers ===
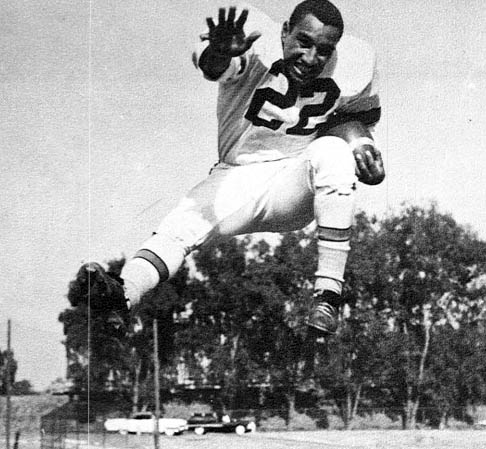
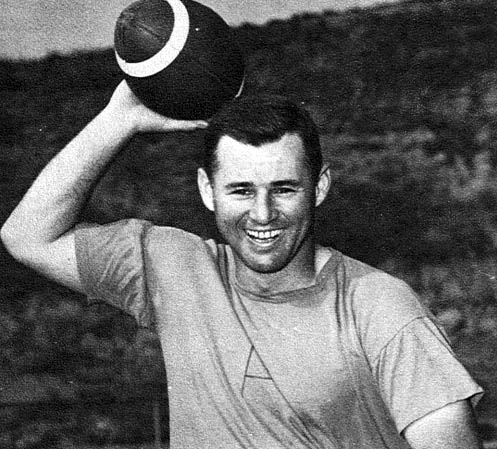
Dick Bass and Eddie LeBaron, two of the players whose numbers were retired by Pacific

Pacific Tigers retired numbers
No.	Player	Pos.	Tenure	No. ret.	Ref.
22	Dick Bass	HB	1955–1958	September 1984	
39	Willard Harrell	RB	1971–1974	May 1986	
40	Eddie LeBaron	QB	1946–1949	March 1950	
41	Eddie Macon	HB	1949–1951	April 2008	

=== College Football Hall of Fame ===
College Football Hall of Fame
Name	Position	Year	Inducted
Amos Stagg	Coach	1933–1946	1951
Eddie LeBaron	QB	1946–1949	1980
Wayne Hardin	QB / HB / Coach	1946–1948, 1949, 1952	2013

=== Pro Football Hall of Fame ===
Pro Football Hall of Fame
Name	Position	Year	Inducted
Tom Flores	Quarterback, coach	1957–1958	2021

=== All-Americans ===
Year	Player	Pos.	Team
1943	Art McCaffray	DT	CO-1st Team/ NYS-1st Team/ UP-2nd Team
1943	John Podesto	FB	LK-1st Team/ NYS-1st Team/ AP-3rd Team
1943	John Podesto	HB	SS-1st Team
1949	Eddie LeBaron	QB	INSD- 1st/ NEA-1st Team/ UP-2nd Team
1953	Ken Buck	DE	FWAA-1st Team
1958	Dick Bass	RB	AP-2nd Team/ UPI-2nd Team/ NEA-2nd Team/ Time
1973	Willie Viney	G	AP-3rd Team
1974	Willard Harrell	RB	AP-2nd Team
1981	Kirk Harmon	LB	GSN-2nd Team
1981	Mike Merriweather	LB	NEA-2nd Team
1985	Nick Holt	LB	Honorable Mention

== Notable players and alumni ==
- Pete Carroll
- Hue Jackson
- Walt Harris
- Ron Turner
- Greg Robinson
- Jon Gruden
- Ed Donatell
- Dante Scarnecchia
- Bruce Coslet
- Greg Seamon
- Brad Seely
- John Fassel
- Chester Caddas
- Bob Lee
- Jack Myers
- Tom Flores
- Mike Merriweather
- Nick Holt
- Eddie LeBaron
- Don Campora
- Bob Cope
- Eddie Macon
- Amos Alonzo Stagg
- Wayne Hardin
- Dick Bass
- Willard Harrell
- Troy Kopp
- Willie Hector
- John Nisby
- Wayne Hawkins

== Gallery ==
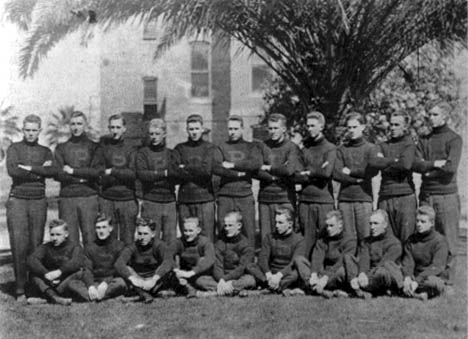
1915 team

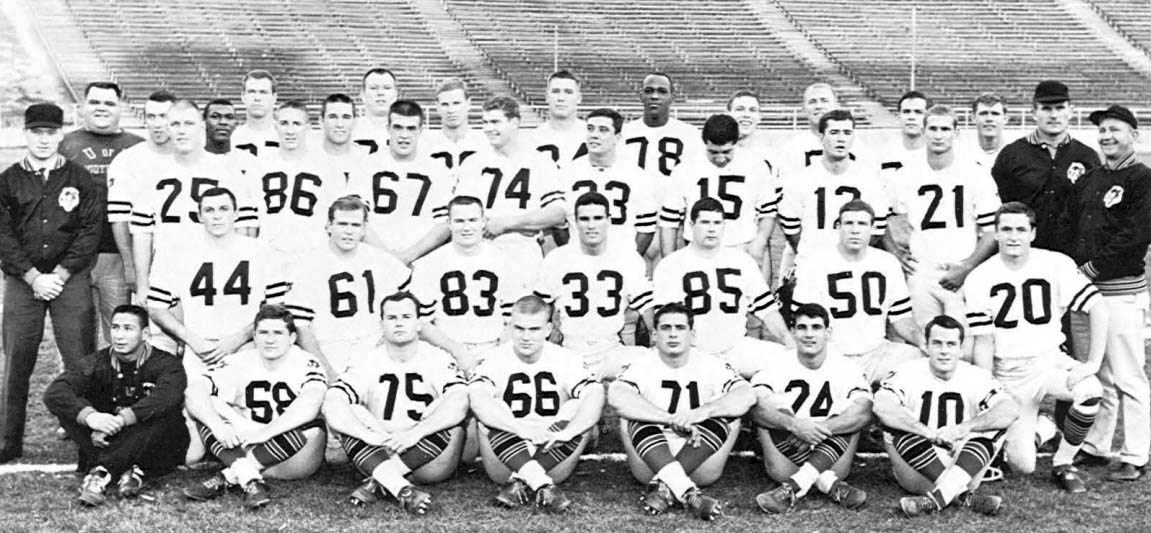
1964 team

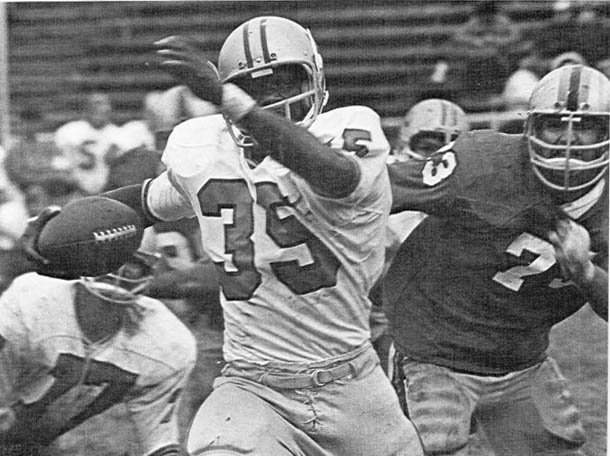
1971 game

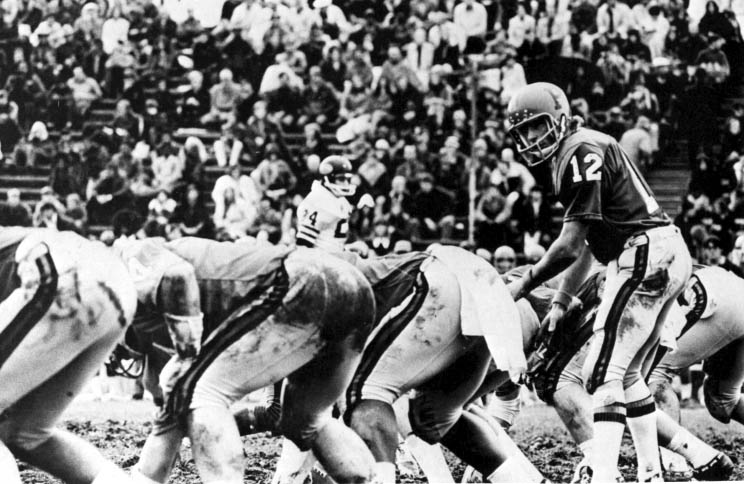
Offensive formation in 1972

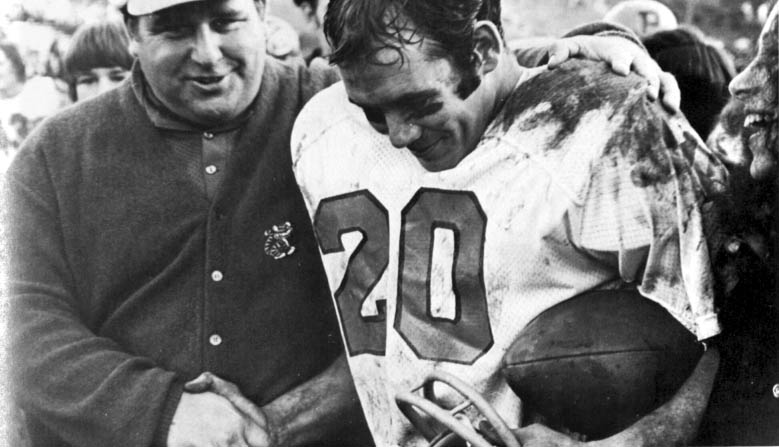
Coach Chester Caddas (left) during a 1972 game

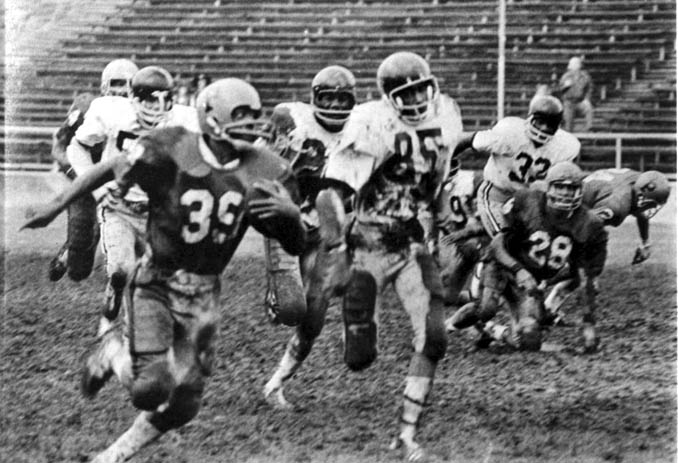
1972 game

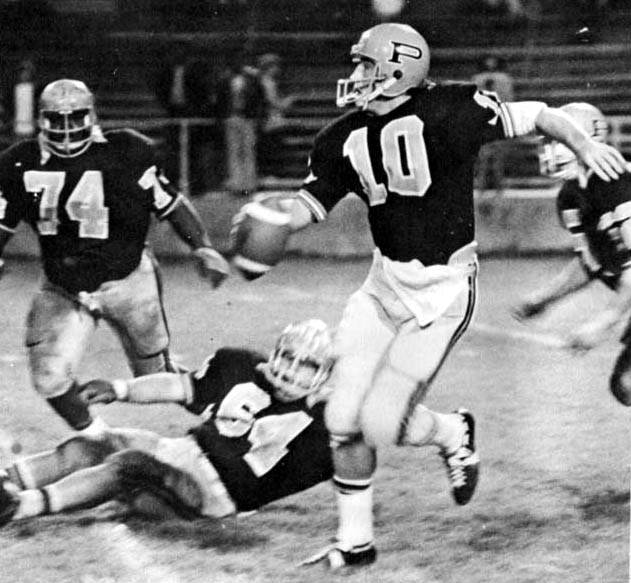
1973 game

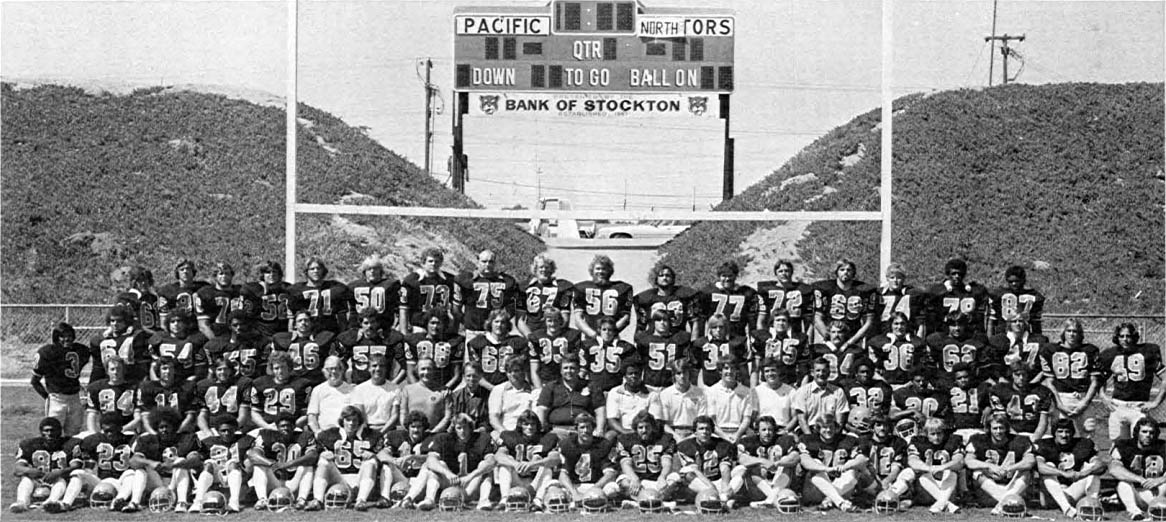
1976 team
