= Joe Scudero =

American football player (1930–2019)

No. 93, 28, 26
- Positions: Safety, return specialist

Personal information
- Born: July 2, 1930; San Francisco, California, U.S.
- Died: September 11, 2019 (aged 89); Ocala, Florida, U.S.
- Listed height: 5 ft 10 in (1.78 m)
- Listed weight: 173 lb (78 kg)

Career information
- High school: Mission (San Francisco)
- College: San Francisco (1949–1951)
- NFL draft: 1954: undrafted

Career history
- Toronto Argonauts (1953); Washington Redskins (1954–1958); Pittsburgh Steelers (1960)

Awards and highlights
- Pro Bowl (1955); CFL All-Star (1953)

Career NFL statistics
- Rushing yards: 139
- Rushing average: 3.2
- Receptions: 6
- Receiving yards: 62
- Interceptions: 10
- Total touchdowns: 3
- Stats at Pro Football Reference

Joseph Andrew "Scooter" Scudero (July 2, 1930 – September 11, 2019) was an American professional football player who was a safety in the National Football League (NFL) for the Washington Redskins and Pittsburgh Steelers. He also played one season in Canadian Football League (CFL) with the Toronto Argonauts, where he was an all-star.

He was born in San Francisco, California, and played college football for the San Francisco Dons. He was a starter on the legendary undefeated 1951 Dons team, which turned down an invitation to the 1952 Orange Bowl due to racial segregation rules. Scudero was inducted into the USF Hall Of Fame in 1981.
