= Ernie Jorge =

American football player and coach (1914–1971)

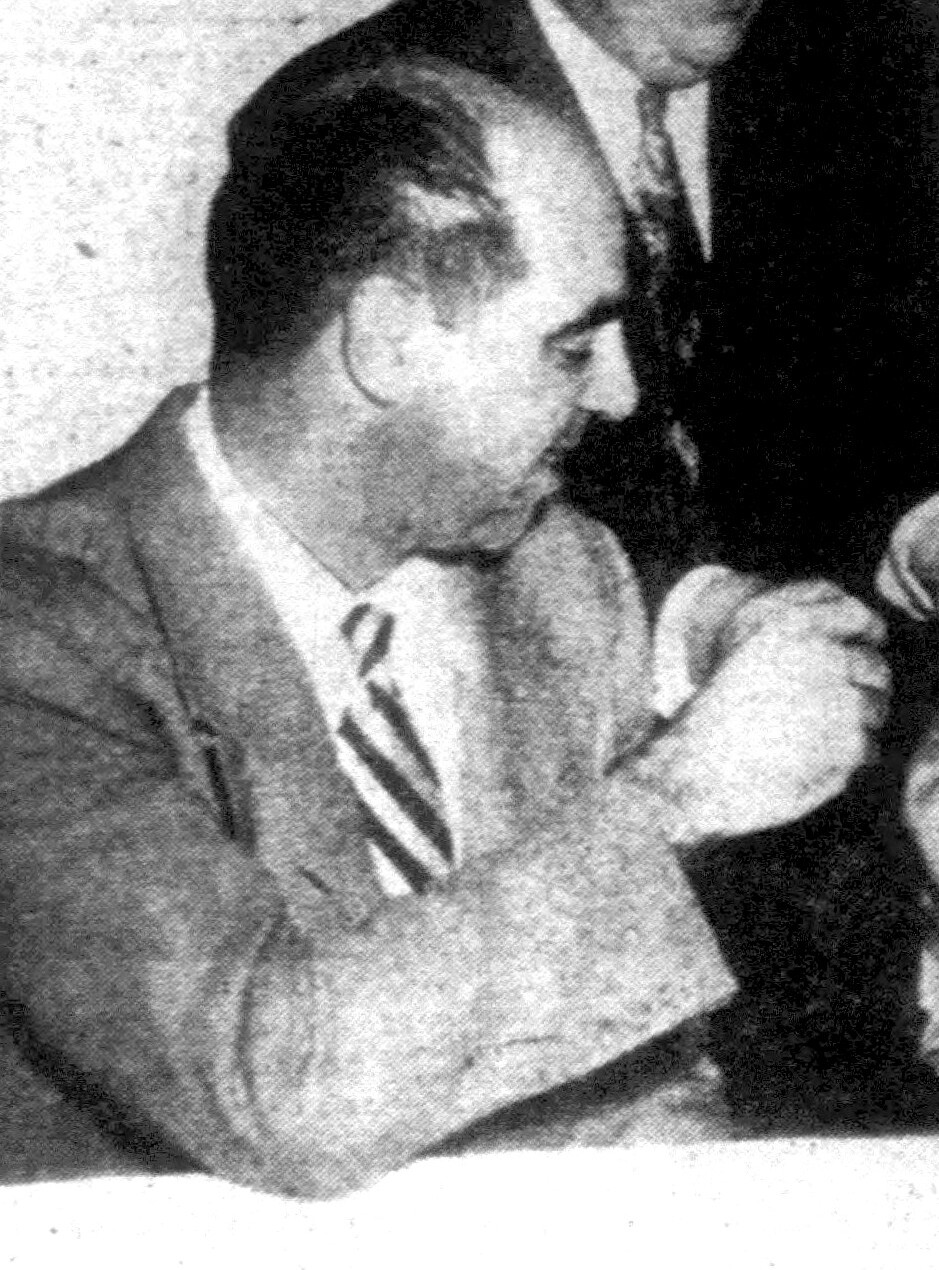
- Jorge in 1953

Biographical details
- Born: October 7, 1914
- Died: October 6, 1971 (aged 56); Kent, Ohio, U.S.

Playing career
- 1937: Saint Mary's (CA)
- Position: Guard

Coaching career (HC unless noted)
- c. 1940: Christian Brothers HS (CA)
- 1940s: Modesto HS (CA)
- 1947–1950: Pacific (CA) (line)
- 1951–1952: Pacific (CA)
- 1953–1954: Chicago Cardinals (line)
- 1955–1958: Navy (line)
- 1960: Oakland Raiders (DL)

Head coaching record
- Overall: 13–8–1 (college)
- Bowls: 1–1

Ernest L. Jorge (October 7, 1914 – October 6, 1971) was an American football coach. He served as the head football coach at the College of the Pacific—now known as the University of the Pacific—in Stockton, California from 1951 to 1952, compiling a record of 13–8–1. Jorge led the Pacific Tigers to consecutive appearances in the Sun Bowl. Jorge played high school football at Turlock High School in Turlock, California and college football at Saint Mary's College of California. He began his coaching career at Christian Brothers High School in Sacramento, California and later moved to Modesto High School in Modesto, California. He joined the coaching staff at Pacific in 1947 as line coach under Larry Siemering. Jorge was found dead at a Holiday Inn in Kent, Ohio, on October 6, 1971. He was working as a college scout for the Houston Oilers of the National Football League (NFL) at the time of his death.

== Head coaching record ==
=== College ===
Year	Team	Overall	Conference	Standing	Bowl/playoffs
Pacific Tigers (Independent) (1951–1952)
1951	Pacific	6–5			L Sun
1952	Pacific	7–3–1			W Sun
Pacific:		13–8–1			
Total:		13–8–1			
