= San Francisco Dons football =

- First season: 1917
- Last season: 1982
- Location: San Francisco, California
- Stadium: Kezar Stadium
- NCAA division: Division II
- Conference: Division II Independent
- Colors: Green and gold
- All-time record: 134–180–20 (.431)
- Bowl record: 0–0 (–)

National championships
- Claimed: 0

Conference championships
- 0

Division championships
- 0
- Website: USFDons.com

The San Francisco Dons football program were the intercollegiate American football team for University of San Francisco located in San Francisco, California. The school's first football team was fielded in 1917. The program originally disbanded after the 1951 season because the team refused to accept a bid to the then-segregated Orange Bowl and sit their 2 African-American players at home, which would have given the program a $100,000 payout that at least temporarily would have allowed the program to continue. The program was revived at the Division II level in 1965. The program disbanded for good in 1982.

== 1951 season ==
Compared to local rivals Santa Clara and Saint Mary's, USF's football teams were historically not as strong. However, the 1951 Dons entered college football lore by fielding a team that would go undefeated and produce three National Football League (NFL) Hall of Famers (Gino Marchetti, Ollie Matson, Bob St. Clair), (Dick Stanfel, also in the Pro Football Hall of Fame, having been a senior the year prior bringing the total for the 1950 team to four members enshrined), five who were selected to the Pro Bowl in their careers and eight in total who played in the NFL. Additionally, linebacker Burl Toler, became the first Black NFL referee, and the team's student publicity director was future NFL commissioner, Pete Rozelle. The Super Bowl MVP trophy is named after him.

The Sugar, Orange and Gator Bowls all considered inviting the Dons. However, all three were located in the South. Only the Orange Bowl was willing to invite the Dons, with the condition that Ollie Matson and Burl Toler, the Dons' only Black players, were excluded. Although the football program was in severe financial straits (it was shut down after the season), the Dons turned down the bid. As a result, USF's finest football team ever was to be its last in Division I. Football made a brief comeback as a Division II sport from the 1960s to the early 1980s, but USF has not fielded a varsity team since 1982.

The coach, Joe Kuharich, at times, would delegate recruiting responsibilities to his freshman coach, Brad Lynn. Lynn had little to offer prospective players in the way of scholarship inducements beyond tuition and room and board in an old ROTC barracks. However, Lynn would take recruits to the highest hill on campus and gesture out towards the sweeping panorama of San Francisco saying, "THIS is your campus." Only a handful of players from that 1951 team had been considered blue-ribbon prospects in high school. Two of the team's best players, Toler and guard Louis (Red) Stephens, had not even played high school football. Marchetti was a high school dropout who had played only sparingly when he was in school.

The 1951 Dons were honored during the 2008 Fiesta Bowl and were the subject of the 2014 documentary '51 Dons.

1951 San Francisco Dons football
Record	9–0–0 (Final AP Poll ranking: 14)
Head coach	Kuharich
Assistant coaches	Brad Lynn, Ryan, Kerr, Daly, Zanazzi
Players	Arenivar; Arnoldy; Becker; Boggan; Brown; Bruna; Carley; Chess; Colombini; Conte; Cronan; Dando; Dawson; DeBernardi; Dwyer; Giorgi; Henneberry; Hillig; Holm; Huxley; Kearney; Lawson Madden; Marchetti; Matson; McLaughlin; McMahon; Mergen; Montero; Monti; Moriarity; Peacock; Retzloff; Roland; Sachs; Sakowski; Scudero; Schaeffer; Skalla; Slajchert; Springer; St. Clair; Stephens; Thiel; Thomas; Toler; Tringali; Weibel; Welsh; Whitney; Wilwerding
Sports information officer	Rozelle

== National Award Winners ==
Walter Camp Man of the Year Award

Walter Camp Man of the Year
Year	Name	Position at USF	Career at USF
1969	Pete Rozelle	Student/Athletic News Director	1948-1950

The Walter Camp Man of the Year is given to the "Man of the Year" in the world of college football. The criteria for the award are "success, leadership, public service, integrity, and commitment to American heritage and Walter Camp's philosophy."

National Football Foundation Distinguished American Award

National Football Foundation Distinguished American Award
Year	Name	Position at USF	Career at USF
1990	Pete Rozelle	Student/Athletics News Director	1948-1950

Every year, the National Football Foundation & College Football Hall of Fame pays tribute to a select few with awards of excellence for exhibiting superior qualities of scholarship, citizenship and leadership. Additionally, the Foundation also recognizes individuals who demonstrate outstanding support for promoting the game of amateur football. The Distinguished American Award is presented on special occasions when a truly deserving individual emerges, the award honors someone who has applied the character building attributes learned from amateur sport in their business and personal life, exhibiting superior leadership qualities in education, amateur athletics, business and in the community.

Reds Bagnell Award

Reds Bagnell Award
Year	Name	Position at USF	Career at USF
1989	Pete Rozelle	Student/Athletics News Director	1948-1950

The Reds Bagnell Award is presented annually to an individual for their contributions to the game of American football. The award is presented by the Maxwell Football Club. It is named for longtime Club president and College Football Hall of Fame member Reds Bagnell.

Pop Warner Trophy

Pop Warner Trophy
Year	Name	Position at USF	Career at USF
1951	Ollie Matson	Halfback	1949-1951

The Glenn "Pop" Warner Memorial Trophy was awarded annually by the Palo Club to the most valuable senior player on the West Coast. It was awarded from 1949 to 2004. Notably, all but 5 recipients played for Pac-10 institutions. Ollie Mateson was the third recipient of the award.

== All-Americans ==
Larry Siemering, C- 1933 (AP-3rd Team; UP-1st Team)
Forrest Hall, HB- 1946 (NEA-3rd Team)
Ollie Matson, FB -1951 (AP-1st Team; UP-2nd Team; CP-2nd Team; INSO-1st Team) (College and Pro Football Hall of Fame)
Ollie Matson, DB -1951 (NEAD-1st Team; FWD-1st Team) (College and Pro Football Hall of Fame)

== Hall of Fame ==
College Football Hall of Fame
Name	Position	Years at USF	Inducted
Ollie Matson	HB	1949-1951	1976

In 1951, Matson's senior year at USF, he led the nation in rushing yardage and touchdowns en route to leading the Dons to an undefeated season. He was selected as an All-American and finished ninth in Heisman Trophy balloting that year. Despite its 9–0 record, the 1951 San Francisco team was not invited to a bowl game. Matson was inducted into the College Football Hall of Fame in 1976.

Pro Football Hall of Fame
Name	Position	Years at USF	Inducted
Pete Rozelle	NFL Commissioner	1948–1950	1985
Ollie Matson	HB	1949-1951	1972
Gino Marchetti	DE/OT	1951	1972
Bob St. Clair	DT/OT	1949-1951	1990
Dick Stanfel	OG	1948-1950	2016

Pete Rozelle was an American businessman and executive. Rozelle served as the commissioner of the National Football League (NFL) for nearly thirty years, from January 1960 until his retirement in November 1989. He is credited with making the NFL into one of the most successful sports leagues in the world. He was inducted into the Pro Football Hall of Fame in 1985, while still serving a Commissioner of the NFL. Rozelle attended USF as a student publicist in 1948-1949 and worked as the schools Athletic News Director for the Dons in 1950.

Matson was drafted in the first round of the 1952 NFL draft by the Chicago Cardinals, third pick overall. He went on to share 1952 Rookie of the Year honors with Hugh McElhenny of the San Francisco 49ers. Matson was a 6× Pro Bowl (1952, 1954–1958), elected to the NFL 1950s All-Decade Team, enshrined in the Philadelphia Eagles Hall of Fame and the Arizona Cardinals Ring of Honor. Matson was inducted to the Pro Football Hall of Fame in 1972.

Gino Marchetti was a defensive end and offensive tackle in the National Football League (NFL). He played in 1952 for the Dallas Texans and from 1953 to 1966 for the Baltimore Colts. He was a 11× Pro Bowl (1954–1964), the 1960 NFL sacks leader and 2 time NFL Champion in 1958 and 1959 with the Baltimore Colts. He is enshrined in the Baltimore Ravens Ring of Honor and the Indianapolis Colts have retired his No. 89. In 1969, Marchetti was named to the National Football League 50th Anniversary All-Time Team. In 1994, Marchetti was named to the National Football League 75th Anniversary All-Time Team. In 2019, he was unanimously named to the NFL 100th Anniversary All-Time Team. He was inducted into the Pro Football Hall of Fame in 1972.

Bob St. Clair may be the only player in NFL history to have spent nearly all of his entire playing career in the same city, playing in the same stadium at all levels. St. Clair attended San Francisco's Polytechnic High School (located across the street from the stadium) and the University of San Francisco, and was part of USF's undefeated 1951 team. He was drafted by the San Francisco 49ers in 1953 and played his entire professional career in San Francisco until his retirement prior to the 1964 season. In 2001, as a tribute for playing a total of 17 seasons and 189 home games at Kezar Stadium, the city of San Francisco renamed the stadium's field in honor of St. Clair. He was a 5× Pro Bowl (1956, 1958–1961), elected to the NFL 1950s All-Decade Team, San Francisco 49ers Hall of Fame and the San Francisco 49ers retired his No. 79. He was elected to the Pro Football Hall of Fame in 1990.

Dick Stanfel was a 2× NFL champion (1952, 1953) with the Detroit Lions, 5× Pro Bowler (1953, 1955–1958), elected to the NFL 1950s All-Decade Team and the Detroit Lions All-Time Team. He was inducted into the Pro Football Hall of Fame in 2016.

== Notable former players ==
Notable alumni include:

- Gino Marchetti
- Ollie Matson
- Bob St. Clair
- Dick Stanfel
- Burl Toler
- Larry Siemering
- Red Stephens
- Joe Scudero
- Ed Brown
