= 1951 Los Angeles State Diablos football team =

American college football season

1951 Los Angeles State Diablos football
- Conference: California Collegiate Athletic Association
- Record: 1–7 (0–4 CCAA)
- Head coach: Leonard Adams (1st season)
- Home stadium: Los Angeles City College

1951 California Collegiate Athletic Association football standings
	Conf.					Overall
Team	W		L		T	W		L		T
San Diego State $	4	–	0	–	0	10	–	0	–	1
Cal Poly	2	–	1	–	1	5	–	4	–	1
Pepperdine	2	–	1	–	1	5	–	4	–	1
Santa Barbara	1	–	3	–	0	5	–	4	–	0
Los Angeles State	0	–	4	–	0	1	–	7	–	0
$ – Conference champion

The 1951 Los Angeles State Diablos football team represented Los Angeles State College—now known as California State University, Los Angeles—as a member of the California Collegiate Athletic Association (CCAA) during the 1951 college football season. This was the first year of intercollegiate play for the school. Led by first-year head coach Leonard Adams, Los Angeles State compiled an overall record of 1–7 with a mark of 0–4 in conference play, placing last out of five teams in the CCAA. The team was outscored by its opponents 220 to 63 for the season and was shut out four times. The Diablos played home games at Los Angeles City College in Los Angeles.

== Schedule ==
Date	Time	Opponent	Site	Result	Attendance	Source
September 28		Terminal Island Navy (Note: Naval Air Station Terminal Island was one of several names for the Naval air station and repair facility located on Terminal Island in Los Angeles County, California from 1938 to 1997)*	Los Angeles City College; Los Angeles, CA	L 18–26		
October 5		at San Francisco State*	Cox Stadium; San Francisco, CA	L 13–37		
October 13		at Cal Poly	Mustang Stadium; San Luis Obispo, CA	L 0–21		
October 19	8:00 p.m.	at Occidental*	D. W. Patterson Field; Los Angeles, CA	L 0–16		
October 27		at San Diego State	Aztec Bowl; San Diego, CA	L 0–64	6,000	
November 2		La Verne*	Los Angeles City College; Los Angeles, CA	W 19–14		
November 9		Pepperdine	Los Angeles City College; Los Angeles, CA ("Old Shoe" rivalry)	L 13–16		
November 16		at Santa Barbara	La Playa Stadium; Santa Barbara, CA	L 0–26		
*Non-conference game; All times are in Pacific time
