= 1951 Santa Clara Broncos football team =

American college football season

1951 Santa Clara Broncos football
- Conference: Independent
- Record: 3–5–1
- Head coach: Richard F. Gallagher (2nd season)
- Home stadium: Kezar Stadium

1951 Western college football independents records
	Conf.			Overall
Team	W	L	T	W		L		T
No. 14 San Francisco		–		9	–	0	–	0
La Verne		–		5	–	3	–	0
Pacific (CA)		–		6	–	5	–	0
Fresno State		–		5	–	5	–	0
Santa Clara		–		3	–	5	–	1
Hawaii		–		4	–	7	–	0
Loyola (CA)		–		3	–	6	–	0
San Jose State		–		2	–	7	–	1
Cal Poly San Dimas		–		1	–	6	–	0
Rankings from AP Poll

The 1951 Santa Clara Broncos football team was an American football team that represented Santa Clara University as an independent during the 1951 college football season. In their second season under head coach Richard F. Gallagher, the Broncos compiled a 3–5–1 record and were outscored by opponents by a combined total of 234 to 140. The team was ranked at No. 61 in the 1951 Litkenhous Ratings.

== Schedule ==
Date	Opponent	Site	Result	Attendance	Source
September 22	at No. 5 California	California Memorial Stadium; Berkeley, CA	L 0–34	44,000	
September 29	at Washington State	Memorial Stadium; Spokane, WA	L 20–34	16,000	
October 6	at UCLA	Los Angeles Memorial Coliseum; Los Angeles, CA	L 17–44	18,640	
October 14	Loyola (CA)	Kezar Stadium; San Francisco, CA	W 20–16	10,000	
October 20	at No. 13 Stanford	Stanford Stadium; Stanford, CA	L 14–21	20,000	
October 27	at No. 19 Arkansas	War Memorial Stadium; Little Rock, AR	W 21–12	14,500	
November 4	vs. No. 20 San Francisco	Kezar Stadium; San Francisco, CA	L 7–26	32,685	
November 17	at San Jose State	Spartan Stadium; San Jose, CA	T 7–7	11,000	
November 25	vs. Marquette	Charles C. Hughes Stadium; Sacramento, CA	W 27–14	10,000	
Rankings from AP Poll released prior to the game
