= 1951 Occidental Tigers football team =

American college football season

1951 Occidental Tigers football
- Conference: Southern California Intercollegiate Athletic Conference
- Record: 6–2 (4–0 SCIAC)
- Head coach: Roy Dennis (7th season)
- Home stadium: Patterson Field

1951 Southern California Intercollegiate Athletic Conference football standings
	Conf.					Overall
Team	W		L		T	W		L		T
Occidental $	4	–	0	–	0	6	–	2	–	0
Redlands	2	–	2	–	0	3	–	5	–	0
Whittier	2	–	2	–	0	2	–	7	–	0
Caltech	1	–	3	–	0	2	–	5	–	0
Pomona	1	–	3	–	0	1	–	7	–	0
$ – Conference champion

The 1951 Occidental Tigers football team represented Occidental College as a member of the Southern California Intercollegiate Athletic Conference (SCIAC) during the 1951 college football season. Led by seventh-year head coach Roy Dennis, the Tigers compiled an overall record of 6–2 with a mark of 4–0 in conference play, winning the SCIAC title. Occidental played home games at Patterson Field in Los Angeles.

== Schedule ==
Date	Time	Opponent	Site	Result	Attendance	Source
September 28		Cal Aggies*	Patterson Field; Los Angeles, CA	W 14–13		
October 5	8:15 p.m.	at Santa Barbara*	La Playa Stadium; Santa Barbara, CA	L 25–27	6,000	
October 13	8:15 p.m.	Whittier^{†}	Patterson Field; Los Angeles, CA (rivalry)	W 7–0	3,500–4,000	
October 19	8:00 p.m.	Los Angeles State*	Patterson Field; Los Angeles, CA	W 16–0		
October 27	8:00 p.m.	at Fresno State*	Ratcliffe Stadium; Fresno, CA	L 6–27	6,393–8,000	
November 2	8:00 p.m.	Redlands	Patterson Field; Los Angeles, CA	W 35–7		
November 9	8:00 p.m.	Caltech	Patterson Field; Los Angeles, CA	W 26–13	5,000	
November 17	2:00 p.m.	at Pomona	Claremont, CA	W 42–20		
*Non-conference game; ^{†}Homecoming; All times are in Pacific time
