= 1951 Hawaii Rainbows football team =

American college football season

1951 Hawaii Rainbows football

Pineapple Bowl, L 13–34 vs. San Diego State
- Conference: Independent
- Record: 4–7
- Head coach: Archie Kodros (1st season)
- Home stadium: Honolulu Stadium

1951 Western college football independents records
	Conf.			Overall
Team	W	L	T	W		L		T
No. 14 San Francisco		–		9	–	0	–	0
La Verne		–		5	–	3	–	0
Pacific (CA)		–		6	–	5	–	0
Fresno State		–		5	–	5	–	0
Santa Clara		–		3	–	5	–	1
Hawaii		–		4	–	7	–	0
Loyola (CA)		–		3	–	6	–	0
San Jose State		–		2	–	7	–	1
Cal Poly San Dimas		–		1	–	6	–	0
Rankings from AP Poll

The 1951 Hawaii Rainbows football team represented the University of Hawaiʻi at Mānoa as an independent during the 1951 college football season. In their first season under head coach Archie Kodros, the Rainbows compiled a 4–7 record.

== Schedule ==
Date	Opponent	Site	Result	Attendance	Source
September 12	Honolulu Town Team	Honolulu Stadium; Honolulu, Territory of Hawaii	W 8–2	18,000	
September 22	at Tulsa	Skelly Stadium; Tulsa, OK	L 0–58	14,479	
September 29	at BYU	Cougar Stadium; Provo, UT	L 7–20	8,000–8,500	
October 6	at Cincinnati	Nippert Stadium; Cincinnati, OH	L 0–34	20,000	
October 24	Mickalums	Honolulu Stadium; Honolulu, Territory of Hawaii	W 40–20	1,000	
November 7	Honolulu Town Team	Honolulu Stadium; Honolulu, Territory of Hawaii	W 47–13	1,500	
November 18	Submarines Pacific (CA)	Honolulu Stadium; Honolulu, Territory of Hawaii	L 33–35	14,000	
November 30	College of Idaho	Honolulu Stadium; Honolulu, Territory of Hawaii	W 31–13	11,000	
December 16	Pendleton	Honolulu Stadium; Honolulu, Territory of Hawaii	L 26–31	5,000	
December 21	Arizona^{†}	Honolulu Stadium; Honolulu, Territory of Hawaii	L 21–32	7,500	
January 1, 1952	San Diego State	Honolulu Stadium; Honolulu, Territory of Hawaii (Pineapple Bowl)	L 13–34	10,000	
^{†}Homecoming
