= 1951 Cal Aggies football team =

American college football season

1951 Cal Aggies football

FWC champion

Pear Bowl, L 7–25 vs. Pacific (OR)
- Conference: Far Western Conference
- Record: 5–4 (3–1 FWC)
- Head coach: Ted Forbes (3rd season)
- Captain: Don Lehman
- Home stadium: Aggie Field

1951 Far Western Conference football standings
	Conf.					Overall
Team	W		L		T	W		L		T
Cal Aggies $	3	–	1	–	0	5	–	4	–	0
San Francisco State	2	–	0	–	0	8	–	2	–	0
Humboldt State	2	–	1	–	0	4	–	3	–	1
Southern Oregon	1	–	2	–	0	1	–	8	–	0
Chico State	0	–	4	–	0	0	–	7	–	0
$ – Conference champion

The 1951 Cal Aggies football team represented the College of Agriculture at Davis—now known as the University of California, Davis—as a member of the Far Western Conference (FWC) during the 1951 college football season. Led by third-year head coach Ted Forbes, the Aggies compiled an overall record of 5–4 with a mark of 3–1 in conference play, winning the FWC title. As FWC champion, they were invited to a postseason bowl game, the Pear Bowl, played in Medford, Oregon, where they lost to the Pacific Badgers of Forest Grove, Oregon, co-champions of the Northwest Conference. The Cal Aggies outscored their opponents 175 to 160 for the season. They played home games at Aggie Field in Davis, California.

== Schedule ==
Date	Time	Opponent	Site	Result	Attendance	Source
September 22		Fresno State*	Aggie Field; Davis, CA	L 0–27	2,000	
September 28		at Occidental*	Patterson Field; Los Angeles, CA	L 13–14		
October 13		at Humboldt State	Redwood Bowl; Arcata, CA	W 27–13		
October 20		California JV (Note: The University of California JV team was commonly known as the "Cal Ramblers".)*	Aggie Field; Davis, CA	W 30–21		
October 27		Southern Oregon	Aggie Field; Davis, CA	W 39–7		
November 3		vs. Santa Barbara (Note: The game against Santa Barbara was part of an "All-UC Doubleheader" that was held annually from 1948 to 1963. The other game of the double-header was California vs. UCLA. The games were always held at the home stadium of either Cal or UCLA.)*	Los Angeles Memorial Coliseum; Los Angeles, CA	W 13–7		
November 9	8:00 p.m.	Chico State	Aggie Field; Davis, CA	W 34–21		
November 16		at San Francisco State	Cox Stadium; San Francisco, CA	L 12–25		
November 24		vs. Pacific (OR)*	Medford Stadium; Medford, OR (Pear Bowl)	L 7–25		
*Non-conference game; All times are in Pacific time
