= Grover Klemmer =

American athlete (1921–2015)

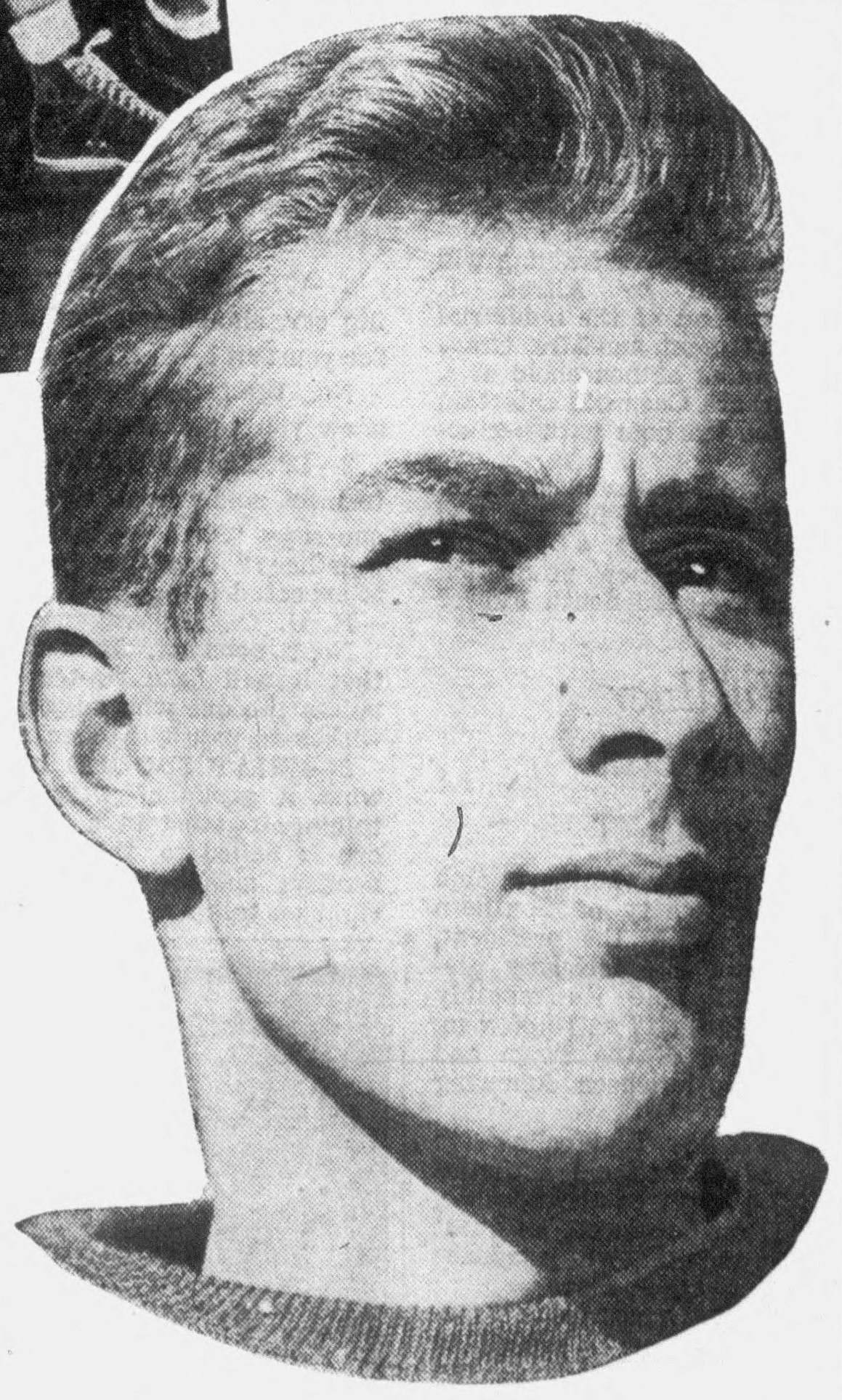
- Klemmer, c. 1943

Biographical details
- Born: March 16, 1921; San Francisco, California, U.S.
- Died: August 23, 2015 (aged 94); Oakland, California, U.S.

Playing career

Football
- 1942: California
- 1945: Great Lakes Navy

Basketball
- 1942–1943: California

Track and field
- c. 1941: California
- Position: Halfback

Coaching career (HC unless noted)

Football
- 1946–1961: CC of San Francisco

Head coaching record
- Bowls: 1–0

Accomplishments and honors

Championships
- 2 junior college national (1946, 1948); 2 NCJCC (1946, 1948); 2 Big Seven/Eight (CA) (1951, 1957)

Grover Haines Klemmer Jr. (March 16, 1921 – August 23, 2015) was an American sprinter, college football player and coach, and National Football League (NFL) official. At the University of California, he lettered in football, basketball and track. He was called the "golden boy" for the Golden Bears.

In 1941, Klemmer set the world record for the 400 metres, running 46.0 around a single turn at the University of Pennsylvania Franklin Field on June 29, 1941. Two weeks earlier, he anchored the Bears mile relay team to a world record in 3:09.4, edging out the University of Southern California team anchored by Hubie Kerns (who also was second in Philadelphia) by reportedly 4 inches (10 cm). Five minutes later, he was informed of the death of his father, Grover Klemmer, Sr. earlier that day. Klemmer was the USA National Champion at 440 yards in 1940 at age 19 and again in 1941, representing the San Francisco Olympic Club.

Klemmer played for the 1945 Great Lakes Navy Bluejackets football team as a halfback under head coach Paul Brown. He served as the head football coach at City College of San Francisco (CCSF) from 1946 to 1961. He was an official in the NFL from 1963 to 1981, working mainly as a back judge and side judge, wearing uniform number 8.

Klemmer was born and raised in San Francisco, where he graduated from Galileo High School in 1939. He died on August 23, 2015, in Oakland, California.

== Head coaching record ==
=== Junior college ===
Year	Team	Overall	Conference	Standing	Bowl/playoffs
San Francisco Junior College / City College of San Francisco Rams (Northern California Junior College Conference) (1946–1950)
1946	San Francisco Junior College	8–1	7–0	1st	
1947	San Francisco Junior College				
1948	City College of San Francisco	12–0	8–0	1st (A Division)	W Gold Dust Bowl
1949	City College of San Francisco	4–4–1	3–2–1	3rd (Southern)	
1950	City College of San Francisco	2–6	1–4	6th (Southern)	
City College of San Francisco Rams (Big Seven/Eight Conference) (1951–1961)
1951	City College of San Francisco	7–2	6–0	1st	
1952	City College of San Francisco	3–6	2–4	5th	
1953	City College of San Francisco	4–3–2	4–1–1	2nd	
1954	City College of San Francisco	6–1–1	4–1–1	3rd	
1955	City College of San Francisco	9–1	6–1	2nd	
1956	City College of San Francisco	6–2	6–1	2nd	
1957	City College of San Francisco	6–3	5–2	T–1st	
1958	City College of San Francisco	4–5	3–4	T–5th	
1959	City College of San Francisco	3–4	3–4	T–5th	
1960	City College of San Francisco	6–2–1	4–2–1	3rd	
1961	City College of San Francisco	7–3	5–2	T–2nd	
City College of San Francisco:					
Total:					
National championship Conference title Conference division title or championship game berth
