= Toi Cook =

American football player (born 1964)

No. 41
- Position: Cornerback

Personal information
- Born: December 3, 1964 (age 61); Chicago, Illinois, U.S.
- Listed height: 5 ft 11 in (1.80 m)
- Listed weight: 188 lb (85 kg)

Career information
- High school: Montclair (Van Nuys, California)
- College: Stanford
- NFL draft: 1987: 8th round, 207th overall pick

Career history
- New Orleans Saints (1987–1993); San Francisco 49ers (1994–1995); Denver Broncos (1996)*; Carolina Panthers (1996–1997)
- * Offseason or practice squad member only

Awards and highlights
- Super Bowl champion (XXIX); Second-team All-Pac-10 (1986)

Career NFL statistics
- Tackles: 362
- Interceptions: 20
- Sacks: 9
- Stats at Pro Football Reference

Toi Fitzgerald Cook (born December 3, 1964) is an American former professional football player who was selected by the New Orleans Saints in the eighth round of the 1987 NFL draft. A 5'11", 188 lb (85 kg). defensive back from Stanford University, he played in 11 NFL seasons from 1987 to 1997. In 1992, he had a career-high six interceptions for 90 yards and one touchdown for the Saints. He appeared in Super Bowl XXIX for the victorious San Francisco 49ers, and had an interception in the game. Before his NFL career, he was an outfielder, and the leadoff hitter, on Stanford's 1987 College World Series national champion baseball team.

== Early life ==
Born in Chicago, Illinois, Cook went to Montclair College Preparatory School, a private school in Van Nuys, California. His graduating class was composed of 57 students.

== College career ==
Cook was a two-sport star and a three-year starter at Stanford, playing both baseball and football - right field / center field, and defensive back. He was a communications major. MVP of the Alpha League.

On April 12, 1985, Cook hit a line drive off the University of Arizona's big league left-handed pitching prospect Mike Young. The shot hit Young and shattered his zygomatic arch. Young would never return to form. The promising lefty would never play above AA baseball.

Cook was the Defensive MVP of the 1986 Coca-Cola Classic, a regular-season National Collegiate Athletic Association (NCAA) college football game played in Tokyo, Japan.

He was inducted into the Stanford Hall of Fame / Champions as a two-sport standout (football/baseball) in July 2014.

== Professional career ==
Pre-draft measurables
Height	Weight	Arm length	Hand span	40-yard dash	10-yard split	20-yard split	20-yard shuttle	Vertical jump
5 ft 10 1/4 in (1.78 m)	185 lb (84 kg)	29 1/2 in (0.75 m)	8 1/2 in (0.22 m)	4.58 s	1.56 s	2.67 s	4.30 s	29.0 in (0.74 m)
All values from NFL Combine

=== Minnesota Twins ===
Cook was selected by the Minnesota Twins in the 38th round of the 1987 MLB June Amateur Draft from Stanford University (Palo Alto, CA), but chose to play NFL football.

=== New Orleans Saints ===
At 22 years old, Cook was an eighth-round draft choice of the New Orleans Saints as a defensive back. He was coached by Jim Mora.

He served as a player representative for the NFLPA for ten years as an NFL player. He was instrumental in helping convince Gene Upshaw, executive director of the NFLPA, and its board members to move into the entertainment arena by licensing the players under the league's group licensing program for entertainment productions.

=== San Francisco 49ers ===
Cook played under 49er head coach George Seifert. In 1994, San Francisco assembled a championship team good enough to beat the Dallas Cowboys in the NFC championship game, and the San Diego Chargers in the Super Bowl. After turning down a million-dollar contract offer from the Cincinnati Bengals because he didn't think they could win, he played for only the league minimum of $162,000 but won the Super Bowl with the 49ers. Cook played cornerback, nickelback and safety.

A torn rotator cuff landed Cook on the 49ers' injured reserve list in 1995. He became a free agent in the following summer, trying out with the Denver Broncos before signing with Carolina.

=== Carolina Panthers ===
Cook played defensive back for the Panthers under Coach Dom Capers. In February 1997, he was released as an unrestricted free agent ending an eleven-year NFL career.

== Life after football ==
Cook hosted post-game football shows for WWL in New Orleans, NFC preview shows and NFL Europe games for Fox Television. He returned to San Francisco as an NFL game analyst for KRON, and then co-hosted ESPN radio shows. Cook worked with California Gov. Arnold Schwarzenegger and his wife, Maria Shriver, to introduce "Polar Ball" (played with a Velcro ball and one glove) to the Special Olympics Committee.

Amarantus Appointed Super Bowl Champion Toi Cook to the Board of Advisors in September 2012 to the Traumatic Brain Injury (TBI) Program

Cook was the Executive Vice President in the Sports Division at the Gersh Agency in Los Angeles from 2004 to 2006.

He became principal owner of Toi Cook Management Group LLC on September 25, 2007. In September 2012, he became president of Empire Sports, a division of Empire Film Group and a sports, entertainment and consulting company.

On September 22, 2015, Cook became one of the more than 220 former NFL players serving as master trainers and ambassadors For USA Football's Heads Up program

== Film and television ==
After his NFL career, Cook appeared in Minister of Defense: the Reggie White Story and '51 Dons as himself. He has producer credits for the Walking on Dead Fish (2008) and The Coach's Journey (2015).

== Personal life ==
Cook and his wife, Kristine, have three children, Connor, Carson and Caitlyn. He is a party to the concussion lawsuit against the NFL.
