= 1951 Santa Barbara Gauchos football team =

American college football season

1951 Santa Barbara Gauchos football
- Conference: California Collegiate Athletic Association
- Record: 5–4 (1–3 CCAA)
- Head coach: Roy Engle (3rd season)
- Home stadium: La Playa Stadium

1951 California Collegiate Athletic Association football standings
	Conf.					Overall
Team	W		L		T	W		L		T
San Diego State $	4	–	0	–	0	10	–	0	–	1
Cal Poly	2	–	1	–	1	5	–	4	–	1
Pepperdine	2	–	1	–	1	5	–	4	–	1
Santa Barbara	1	–	3	–	0	5	–	4	–	0
Los Angeles State	0	–	4	–	0	1	–	7	–	0
$ – Conference champion

The 1951 UC Santa Barbara Gauchos football team represented Santa Barbara College (Note: University of California, Santa Barbara was known as Santa Barbara College of the University of California from 1944 to 1957.) during the 1951 college football season.

Santa Barbara competed in the California Collegiate Athletic Association (CCAA). The team was led by third-year head coach Roy Engle and played home games at La Playa Stadium in Santa Barbara, California. They finished the season with a record of five wins and four losses (5–4, 1–3 CCAA).

== Schedule ==
Date	Time	Opponent	Site	Result	Attendance	Source
September 29		at Pomona*	Claremont Alumni Field; Claremont, CA	W 48–20		
October 5	8:15 p.m.	Occidental*	La Playa Stadium; Santa Barbara, CA	W 27–25	6,000	
October 12		at Fresno State*	Ratcliffe Stadium; Fresno, CA	W 23–22	6,152	
October 20		Whittier	La Playa Stadium; Santa Barbara, CA	W 19–12		
November 3		vs. Cal Aggies (Note: The game against the Cal Aggies was part of an "All-UC Doubleheader" that was held annually from 1948 to 1963. The other game of the double-header was California vs. UCLA. The games were always held at the home stadium of either Cal or UCLA.)	Los Angeles Memorial Coliseum; Los Angeles, CA	L 7–13		
November 10		at Cal Poly*	Mustang Stadium; San Luis Obispo, CA	L 7–14		
November 16		Los Angeles State*	La Playa Stadium; Santa Barbara, CA	W 26–0		
November 22		at San Diego State	Aztec Bowl; San Diego, CA	L 0–40	7,000	
November 30		Pepperdine*	La Playa Stadium; Santa Barbara, CA	L 6–26		
*Non-conference game; All times are in Pacific time
