= 1951 San Jose State Spartans football team =

American college football season

1951 San Jose State Spartans football
- Conference: Independent
- Record: 2–7–1
- Head coach: Bob Bronzan (2nd season)
- Home stadium: Spartan Stadium

1951 Western college football independents records
	Conf.			Overall
Team	W	L	T	W		L		T
No. 14 San Francisco		–		9	–	0	–	0
La Verne		–		5	–	3	–	0
Pacific (CA)		–		6	–	5	–	0
Fresno State		–		5	–	5	–	0
Santa Clara		–		3	–	5	–	1
Hawaii		–		4	–	7	–	0
Loyola (CA)		–		3	–	6	–	0
San Jose State		–		2	–	7	–	1
Cal Poly San Dimas		–		1	–	6	–	0
Rankings from AP Poll

The 1951 San Jose State Spartans football team represented San Jose State College—now known as San Jose State University—as an independent during the 1951 college football season. Led by second-year head coach Bob Bronzan, the Spartans compiled a record of 2–7–1 and were outscored by opponents 222 to 106. The team played home games at Spartan Stadium in San Jose, California.

== Schedule ==
Date	Opponent	Site	Result	Attendance	Source
September 21	at San Francisco	Kezar Stadium; San Francisco, CA	L 2–39	16,000	
September 29	at Stanford	Stanford Stadium; Stanford, CA (rivalry)	L 13–26		
October 6	at Fresno State	Ratcliffe Stadium; Fresno, CA (rivalry)	W 32–6	11,155	
October 12	San Francisco	Spartan Stadium; San Jose, CA	L 7–42	10,000	
October 20	at Idaho	Neale Stadium; Moscow, ID	L 7–40	6,500	
October 26	Loyola (CA)	Spartan Stadium; San Jose, CA	L 12–13	7,500	
November 3	San Diego Navy (Note: Naval Training Center San Diego (Naval Training Station) was a U.S. Navy facility from 1923 to 1997.)	Balboa Stadium?; San Diego, CA	L 12–28		
November 17	Santa Clara	Spartan Stadium; San Jose, CA	T 7–7	11,000	
November 23	Pacific (CA)	Spartan Stadium; San Jose, CA (Victory Bell)	W 7–0	10,000	
December 1	Marquette	Spartan Stadium; San Jose, CA	L 7–21		

== Team players in the NFL ==
No San Jose State players were selected in the 1952 NFL draft.

The following finished their San Jose State career in 1951, were not drafted, but played in the NFL.

Player	Position	First NFL team
Bob Sykes	Fullback	1952 Washington Redskins
