= 1948 City College of San Francisco Rams football team =

American college football season

1948 City College of San Francisco Rams football

Junior college national championship NCJCC champion NCJCC A Division champion

NCJCC championship game, W 24–9 vs. Menlo

Gold Dust Bowl, W 22–7 vs. Chaffey
- Conference: Northern California Junior College Conference
- A Division
- Record: 12–0 (8–0 NCJCC)
- Head coach: Grover Klemmer (3rd season)

1948 Northern California Junior College Conference football standings
	Conf.					Overall
Team	W		L		T	W		L		T
A Division
CC of San Francisco xy$	8	–	0	–	0	12	–	0	–	0
Hartnell	7	–	1	–	0	8	–	2	–	0
Stockton	4	–	3	–	0	5	–	4	–	0
Sacramento City	4	–	3	–	0	4	–	5	–	0
Modesto	2	–	5	–	0	5	–	6	–	0
San Mateo	2	–	5	–	0	3	–	5	–	0
B Division
Menlo xy	5	–	1	–	0	6	–	3	–	0
Santa Rosa	4	–	3	–	0	6	–	4	–	0
Marin	4	–	4	–	0	5	–	4	–	1
Napa	3	–	3	–	0	6	–	4	–	1
Vallejo	4	–	4	–	0	6	–	4	–	1
Grant Tech	2	–	5	–	0	3	–	7	–	0
Monterey	0	–	4	–	1	?	–	?	–	?
Yuba	0	–	6	–	1	?	–	?	–	?
NCJCC championship: CC of San Francisco 24, Menlo 9
$ – Conference champion; x – Division champion/co-champions; y – Championship game participant

The 1948 City College of San Francisco Rams football team was an American football team that represented City College of San Francisco (CCSF) as a member of the A Division of the Northern California Junior College Conference (NCJCC) during the 1948 junior college football season. In their third year under head coach Grover Klemmer, the Rams compiled a perfect 12–0 record, outscored opponents by a total of 291 to 62, won the NCJCC championship, and defeated Chaffey in the Gold Dust Bowl. CCSF claims the season as the second of 11 junior college national championships for its football program.

College and Pro Football Hall of Fame inductee Ollie Matson made his college football debut with the 1948 Rams. Matson scored 117 points on the season. At the end of the season, Matson and center Burl Toler were named to the National Junior College Athletic Association's first official junior college all-American football team. CCSF was the only school to earn more than one spot on the all-American team.

== Schedule ==
Date	Time	Opponent	Site	Result	Attendance	Source
September 24	8:00 p.m.	Monterey	San Francisco State Stadium; San Francisco, CA	W 37–0	2,000	
October 2		at Vallejo	Vallejo, CA	W 18–0		
October 8		at Sacramento City	Charles C. Hughes Stadium; Sacramento, CA	W 25–7	5,500	
October 16	8:00 p.m.	at Marin	Kentfield, CA	W 13–0		
October 22		San Mateo	San Francisco, CA	W 26–0		
October 29		East Los Angeles*	David J. Cox Stadium; San Francisco, CA	W 48–6		
November 6		at Los Angeles City*	Gilmore Stadium; Los Angeles, CA	W 13–0		
November 11		at Hartnell	Salinas, CA	W 20–7		
November 19		Stockton	Kezar Stadium; San Francisco, CA	W 22–7		
November 27		at Modesto	Modesto, CA	W 25–19		
December 4		Menlo*	George Washington High Field; San Francisco, CA (NCJCC championship game)	W 24–9		
December 11		vs. Chaffey*	Corbus Field; Vallejo, CA (Gold Dust Bowl)	W 20–7	9,500	
*Non-conference game; All times are in Pacific time
