= Archie Kodros =

American football player and coach (1918–1990)

Biographical details
- Born: January 20, 1918
- Died: June 4, 1990 (aged 72); Iowa City, Iowa, U.S.

Playing career
- 1937–1939: Michigan
- 1942: Army All-Stars
- 1945: Second Air Force
- Position: Center

Coaching career (HC unless noted)
- 1940–1941: Michigan (assistant)
- 1948: Whitman (line)
- 1949–1950: Whitman
- 1951: Hawaii
- 1952–1965: Iowa (assistant)

Head coaching record
- Overall: 10–19
- Bowls: 0–1

Accomplishments and honors

Awards
- Third-team All-American (1939)

Archie John Kodros (January 20, 1918 – June 4, 1990) was an American college football player and coach. He played for the University of Michigan football team from 1937 to 1939 and was selected as a first-team All-American and team captain in his senior year. He served in the United States Army Air Forces during World War II. After the war, Kodros worked as a football coach at Whitman College (1948–1950), University of Hawaii (1951), and University of Iowa (1952–1965).

== Athlete ==
Kodros grew up in Alton, Illinois and graduated from Alton High School in 1936. Kodros played football in high school and had an offer to play for the University of Illinois He chose instead to play for the University of Michigan because they had a tradition of having great centers.

Kodros worked his way into the starting line-up at Michigan as a sophomore walk-on in 1937. He played at the center position for Michigan from 1937 to 1939 and was the captain of the 1939 Michigan Wolverines football team. He played on the line with Forest Evashevski and Tom Harmon in the backfield. In 1939, one Ohio sports reporter credited Kodros with a share of Harmon's success: "One reason why Tom Harmon plays so sensationally each Saturday is shown here. The Michigan line, led by Captain Archie Kodros, No. 53, blocks beautifully and opens the way for Tom to get into the secondary, where the star Wolverine back can peddle his own papers." In his final game for Michigan, Kodros intercepted a pass deep in Michigan's territory off Ohio State's All-American quarterback, Don Scott, to help lead the Wolverines to a 21–14 win over the Buckeyes.

Kodros received honorable mentions on several All-American teams and was selected as a first-team All-American by Bill Stern for Life magazine. He ranked third in the United Press All-American voting with 146 points in a close finish behind John Haman on Northwestern (213 points) and John Schiechl of Santa Clara (148 points).

== Coaching career and military service ==
Kodros was drafted by the Green Bay Packers in the 1940 NFL draft (159th overall pick), but he declined the invitation and opted instead to work toward at master's degree in business at Michigan. He later recalled: "I figured I was better off starting in business Pro football didn't pay that much back then because there were only eight teams and television hadn't started by 1940. Maybe you could play a few years in the NFL back then, but then where were you? I said the heck with the pros. I didn't even go for my interview." While studying toward his master's degree, Kodros also worked as an assistant football coach at Michigan under Fritz Crisler in 1940 and 1941.

During World War II, Kodros served in the U.S. Army Air Forces and participated in the invasion of Italy. He played for an Army All-Star football team in 1942 that defeated the Detroit Lions 12 to 10. At the end of the war, he played for an Air Force team called the Second Air Force Superbombers.

In 1948, Kodros was hired as the line coach and assistant professor of physical education at Whitman College in Walla Walla, Washington. He became Whitman's head football coach in 1949 and added the title of athletic director in 1950.

In May 1951, Kodros was hired as the athletic director and head football coach of the University of Hawaii. He compiled a record of 4 wins and 7 losses at Hawaii.

In February 1952, he announced his resignation from Hawaii, and in April 1952, he was hired by his former teammate, Forest Evashevski, who had been named head football coach at the University of Iowa. Kodros served as an assistant football coach at Iowa from 1952 through 1965.

== Later years and family ==
Kodros was married to the former Effie Virginia Jowett on July 10, 1943. The couple had four children, sons Paul, Rodney and Robert, and daughter, Marijo Mihalopoulos. After Kodros retired from coaching, he and his wife owned and operated the Hilltop Mobile Home Park in Iowa City, Iowa. He retired in 1985 and continued to live in Iowa City. In 1990, Kodros died at Mercy Hospital in Iowa City after a long illness with cancer. He was survived by his wife, two sons (Rodney and Robert), a daughter (Marijo), two grandchildren and three sisters.

== Head coaching record ==
| Year | Team | Overall | Conference | Standing | Bowl/playoffs |
|---|---|---|---|---|---|
Whitman Fighting Missionaries (Northwest Conference) (1949–1950)
| 1949 | Whitman | 3–6 | 0–5 | 6th | |
| 1950 | Whitman | 3–6 | 1–4 | T–5th | |
| Whitman: | | 6–12 | 1–9 | | |
Hawaii Rainbows (Independent) (1951)
| 1951 | Hawaii | 4–7 | | | L Pineapple |
| Hawaii: | | 4–7 | | | |
| Total: | | 10–19 | | | |
