= 1951 Pepperdine Waves football team =

American college football season

1951 Pepperdine Waves football
- Conference: California Collegiate Athletic Association
- Record: 5–4–1 (2–1–1 CCAA)
- Head coach: Duck Dowell (1st season)
- Home stadium: El Camino Stadium

1951 California Collegiate Athletic Association football standings
	Conf.					Overall
Team	W		L		T	W		L		T
San Diego State $	4	–	0	–	0	10	–	0	–	1
Cal Poly	2	–	1	–	1	5	–	4	–	1
Pepperdine	2	–	1	–	1	5	–	4	–	1
Santa Barbara	1	–	3	–	0	5	–	4	–	0
Los Angeles State	0	–	4	–	0	1	–	7	–	0
$ – Conference champion

The 1951 Pepperdine Waves football team represented George Pepperdine College (Note: Pepperdine University was known as George Pepperdine College from 1937 to 1970.) as a member of the California Collegiate Athletic Association (CCAA) during the 1951 college football season. The team was led by first-year head coach Duck Dowell and played home games at El Camino Stadium on the campus of El Camino College in Torrance, California. They finished the season with an overall record of 5–4–1 and a mark of 2–1–1 in conference play, tying for second in the CCAA.

== Schedule ==
Date	Opponent	Site	Result	Attendance	Source
September 29	at Fresno State	Ratcliffe Stadium; Fresno, CA	L 14–33	8,945	
October 5	Point Mugu Navy (Note: Naval Air Station Point Mugu was a Naval air station located in Ventura County, California from 1942 to 2000)*	El Camino Stadium; Torrance, CA	W 20–0		
October 12	Terminal Island Navy (Note: Naval Air Station Terminal Island was one of several names for the Naval air station and repair facility located on Terminal Island in Los Angeles County, California from 1938 to 1997)*	El Camino Stadium; Torrance, CA	W 23–0		
October 19	Redlands*	El Camino Stadium; Torrance, CA	W 35–7		
October 26	Cal Poly	El Camino Stadium; Torrance, CA	T 7–7	2,000	
November 3	at Loyola (CA)*	Rose Bowl; Pasadena, CA	L 7–46	6,200	
November 9	at Los Angeles State	Los Angeles City College; Los Angeles, CA ("Old Shoe" rivalry)	W 16–13		
November 16	San Diego State	El Camino Stadium; Torrance, CA	L 6–27		
November 24	BYU*^{†}	El Camino Stadium; Torrance, CA	L 0–20		
November 30	at Santa Barbara	La Playa Stadium; Santa Barbara, CA	W 26–6		
*Non-conference game; ^{†}Homecoming

== Team players in the NFL ==
The following Pepperdine players were selected in the 1952 NFL draft.

Player	Position	Round	Overall	NFL Team
Gerry Perry	Tackle - Defensive Tackle - Defensive End - Guard	29	349	Los Angeles Rams
