= Johnny Podesto =

American football player (1921–2015)

No. 73
- Positions: Quarterback, Halfback

Personal information
- Born: March 26, 1921; Modesto, California, U.S.
- Died: November 13, 2015 (aged 94)
- Listed height: 6 ft 0 in (1.83 m)
- Listed weight: 190 lb (86 kg)

Career information
- High school: Modesto (CA)
- College: Modesto Junior College (?–1941); Saint Mary's University (1940–1942); College of the Pacific (1943)

Awards and highlights
- First-team All-American (1943); First-team All-PCC (1943)

John B. Podesto, nicknamed Presto Podesto from Modesto (March 26, 1921 – November 13, 2015) was an American football quarterback and halfback who played for the St. Mary's Gaels. He was drafted in the first round (10th overall) in the 1944 NFL draft by the Pittsburgh Steelers but did not play for them. He later was signed by the Chicago Bears but did not play with them either.

== Early life and education ==
Podesto was born on March 26, 1921, in Modesto, California, to Giovannia and Maria Podesto. He was the youngest of nine children. He attended Modesto High School and Modesto Junior College before continuing his education at Saint Mary's University and College of the Pacific. He excelled at baseball and football while at Modesto, Saint Mary's, and College of the Pacific. He played quarterback and halfback when he was in football. In 1943, under coach Amos Alonzo Stagg, Podesto was named All-American while at Pacific. While playing from 1941 to 1943, and from 1944 to 1945, Podesto entered the Marine Corps and achieved the rank of captain while in World War II.

== Professional career ==
Podesto was drafted in the first round with the tenth overall pick in the 1944 NFL draft by the Pittsburgh Steelers. He was serving in the marines from 1944 to 1945 so he could not play with them. In 1946, he signed with the team. However, Podesto did not play with the Steelers. The next season he signed with the Chicago Bears but did not play with them, either.

== Later life ==
After Podesto's sports career, he was a successful business owner. He worked with the Modesto Tallow Company for over 50 years. He died on November 13, 2015, at the age of 94. At the time of his death he had 5 children, 12 grandchildren, and 2 great-grandchildren.
