= 1951 Fresno State Bulldogs football team =

American college football season

1951 Fresno State Bulldogs football
- Conference: Independent
- Record: 5–5
- Head coach: Duke Jacobs (2nd season)
- Home stadium: Ratcliffe Stadium

1951 Western college football independents records
	Conf.			Overall
Team	W	L	T	W		L		T
No. 14 San Francisco		–		9	–	0	–	0
La Verne		–		5	–	3	–	0
Pacific (CA)		–		6	–	5	–	0
Fresno State		–		5	–	5	–	0
Santa Clara		–		3	–	5	–	1
Hawaii		–		4	–	7	–	0
Loyola (CA)		–		3	–	6	–	0
San Jose State		–		2	–	7	–	1
Cal Poly San Dimas		–		1	–	6	–	0
Rankings from AP Poll

The 1951 Fresno State Bulldogs football team represented Fresno State College—now known as California State University, Fresno—as an independent during the 1951 college football season. Led by Duke Jacobs in his second and final season as head coach, the Bulldogs compiled a record of 5–5. Fresno State played home games at Ratcliffe Stadium on the campus of Fresno City College in Fresno, California.

== Schedule ==
Date	Time	Opponent	Site	Result	Attendance	Source
September 22		Cal Aggies	Ratcliffe Stadium; Fresno, CA	W 27–0	2,000	
September 29		Pepperdine	Ratcliffe Stadium; Fresno, CA	W 33–14	8,945	
October 6		San Jose State	Ratcliffe Stadium; Fresno, CA (rivalry)	L 6–32	11,155	
October 12		Santa Barbara	Ratcliffe Stadium; Fresno, CA	L 22–23	6,152	
October 20		Cal Poly	Ratcliffe Stadium; Fresno, CA	W 42–19	6,427	
October 27	8:00 p.m.	Occidental	Ratcliffe Stadium; Fresno, CA	W 27–6	6,393–8,000	
November 3		San Diego State	Ratcliffe Stadium; Fresno, CA (rivalry)	L 7–13	8,121	
November 10		at Whittier	Memorial Stadium; Whittier, CA	W 28–0	3,500	
November 17		at North Texas State	Eagle Field; Denton, TX	L 0–62	5,000	
November 24		San Francisco State	Ratcliffe Stadium; Fresno, CA	L 7–20	5,433	
All times are in Pacific time
