= Rose Bowl =

Rose Bowl may refer to:

- Rose Bowl (stadium), Pasadena, California, home stadium for UCLA football
  - Rose Bowl Game, an American postseason college football game held there
- Rose Bowl Aquatics Center, Pasadena, California
- Rose Bowl (cricket ground), West End, Hampshire, England
- Rose Bowl (horse) (1972–1994)
- Rose Bowl series, a women's cricket series between Australia and New Zealand
- Rose Bowl (film), a 1936 American comedy
- Rose Bowl Stakes, a horse race in Newbury, Berkshire, England

== See also ==
- Rose Parade, a New Year's Day parade in Pasadena, California
- U2360° at the Rose Bowl, a concert video
