= Eddie Macon =

American gridiron football player (1927–2017)

No. 25, 35, 90, 28
- Positions: Halfback, cornerback

Personal information
- Born: March 7, 1927; Stockton, California, U.S.
- Died: April 19, 2017 (aged 90); Stockton, California, U.S.
- Listed height: 6 ft 0 in (1.83 m)
- Listed weight: 177 lb (80 kg)

Career information
- High school: Edison (Stockton)
- College: Pacific (1949–1951)
- NFL draft: 1952: 2nd round, 20th overall pick

Career history
- Chicago Bears (1952–1953); Calgary Stampeders (1954); Hamilton Tiger-Cats (1957–1959); Oakland Raiders (1960)

Awards and highlights
- Second-team All-AFL (1960); Grey Cup champion (1957); Second-team All-PCC (1951); Pacific Tigers No. 41 retired

Career NFL/AFL statistics
- Rushing yards: 324
- Rushing average: 4.6
- Rushing touchdowns: 2
- Receptions: 14
- Receiving yards: 49
- Receiving touchdowns: 2
- Interceptions: 9
- Defensive touchdowns: 1
- Stats at Pro Football Reference

Career CFL statistics
- Rushing yards: 942
- Receptions: 24
- Receiving yards: 464
- Interceptions: 17
- Total touchdowns: 9 (Note: 5 rushing, 2 receiving, 2 defensive)

Edwin Donald Macon (March 7, 1927 – April 19, 2017) was an American football halfback and cornerback who played in the National Football League (NFL) for two seasons with the Chicago Bears, then played in the Canadian Football League (CFL) for one season with the Calgary Stampeders and three years with the Hamilton Tiger-Cats, and finally played in the American Football League (AFL) for a lone season with the Oakland Raiders. He played college football for the Pacific Tigers and was selected by the Bears in the second round (20th overall) of the 1952 NFL draft.

== Early life ==
Macon was a track star at Edison High School. He was drafted into the United States Army during World War II in 1945, and was stationed for seven months at Yokohama, Japan, after the war's conclusion. Upon returning to the United States, he joined the San Joaquin Delta College track team, before transferring to Pacific. Macon was convinced by Pacific coach Larry Siemering to join the school's football team, becoming the first black Tigers player. In three seasons with the Tigers, Macon scored 34 touchdowns, and went 24–8–1.

== Professional career ==
Macon was drafted in the second round (twentieth selection) of the 1952 NFL draft by the Chicago Bears. He became the first African-American player on the team; he spent two years as a halfback and return specialist. He was the second African-American to be drafted by the Bears; the first, George Taliaferro, was drafted by them in 1949, but chose to play in the All-America Football Conference. With the Bears, Macon rushed for 324 yards and two touchdowns on 70 attempts while catching 14 passes for 49 yards and two touchdowns. On 22 kick returns, he averaged 30.5 yards per return and 5.9 yards on 24 punt returns. He left the Bears in 1954 to play for the Calgary Stampeders of the Canadian Football League. Bears coach and owner George Halas was not pleased about his departure, blackballing Macon and suing him for $100,000. As a result, the Bears refused to acknowledge Macon being on the team. After being out of football for two years, which he spent as a longshoreman, Macon joined the Hamilton Tiger-Cats in 1957 before leaving in 1959 to resume his longshoreman career, but later joined the Oakland Raiders of the American Football League in 1960. With the Raiders, Macon was converted to defensive back, and was tied for second in the league with nine interceptions, which earned him All-AFL honors.

== Personal life ==
Macon and his wife (of 70 years) Jessie, had four daughters, Edna Rice (Bertram), Marilyn Gayles (Percy), Janice Macon and Andrea Terry (McClellan), as well as a son, Edwin Macon Jr. Eddie and Jessie married in 1945 and resided in Stockton, CA. They relocated to the Bay Area before returning to Stockton to live out their life in a senior living residence as of October 2012.

Upon retiring, Macon worked for over 40 years as a longshoreman, retiring at the age of 86 years old. He died on April 19, 2017, at the age of 90.
