= Chico Senior High School =

Chico High School

Location
- 901 The Esplanade; Chico, California; United States; 39°44′9″N 121°50′42″W

Information
- Type: Public high school
- Established: 1902
- President: Roger Williams
- Principal: Doug Williams
- Teaching staff: 83.65 (FTE)
- Grades: 9-12
- Enrollment: 1,873 (2023–2024)
- Student to teacher ratio: 22.39
- Colours: Scarlet and gold
- Nickname: Panthers
- Rival: Pleasant Valley Vikings
- Yearbook: Caduceus
- Website: http://chs.chicousd.org/

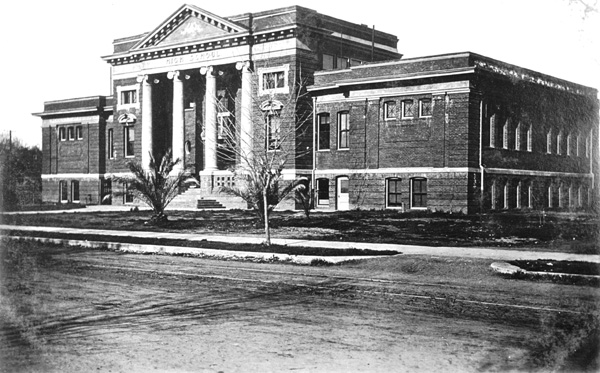
The first Chico High School on West First Street at the present site of the Meriam Library; photo from Meriam Library Special Collections

Chico High School is a four-year comprehensive public high school located in Chico, California, United States. As of 2017, Chico High School has 2,083 students.

Founded in 1902, it predominantly serves as the public school for graduates of Chico Junior High School.

In 1966, Chico High School became a California Distinguished School recognized by the California Department of Education. In 1998 and 1999, it was given the National Blue Ribbon School of Excellence, in 2001 it received the National Service-Learning Leader School, and in 2003–2005 it received National Smaller Learning Communities School award.

In 2008, for the first time, Chico High ended off-campus lunch privileges for freshman students.

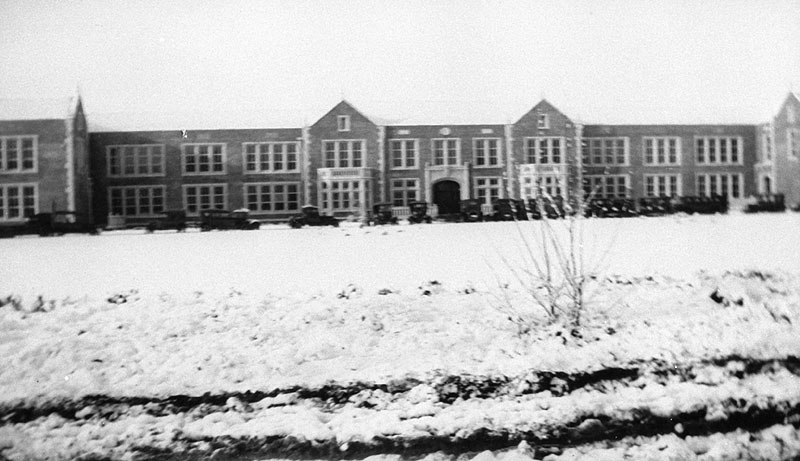
Chico High School on The Esplanade ca. 1925

Since 1967, the school has competed with cross-town rival Pleasant Valley High School at the annual Almond Bowl in junior varsity and varsity football. The game was unnamed in the schools' first three meetings, but local businessmen led by KPAY-AM radio executive Frank Mertz named the contest the "Almond Bowl" before the 1970 clash, when the schools were members of the newly formed Eastern Athletic League. The freshman game is unofficially referred to as the Peanut Bowl; Chico Junior High School played Bidwell Junior High School from the time of Bidwell's establishment in 1958 until 1992, after which freshmen were incorporated into the high schools.

The school hosts its graduation ceremony at its stadium. Before it was built, it was hosted at California State University, Chico. During the graduation ceremony for the Class of 1986, held on June 4, a sprinkler sprayed water on the graduates unexpectedly. Principal Roger Williams scrambled to cover the sprinkler with a garbage can. A video of the incident appears in episodes of America's Funniest Home Videos, first appearing in Season 9, Episode 3.

== Notable alumni ==
- Emily Azevedo, Olympic bobsledder (Vancouver 2010), Class of 2001
- Alden G. Barber, Boy Scouts of America leader
- Nelson Briles, former Major League Baseball player with the St. Louis Cardinals, Pittsburgh Pirates, Kansas City Royals, Texas Rangers and Baltimore Orioles, Class of 1961
- Eddie Butts, former National Football League player with the Chicago Cardinals, Class of 1922
- Gerry Conlee, former National Football League player with the Cleveland Rams, Detroit Lions and San Francisco 49ers
- Haley Cope, Olympic swimmer
- Clay Dalrymple, former Major League Baseball player with the Philadelphia Phillies and Baltimore Orioles, Class of 1954
- Amanda Detmer, television and film actress, Class of 1989
- Thomas C. Fleming, influential African American journalist, Class of 1926
- Nahshon Garrett, Cornell wrestler currently competing with Team USA, Class of 2011
- Brian Keyser, former Major League Baseball player with the Chicago White Sox, Class of 1985
- Kurt Kitayama, professional golfer currently competing on the European Tour, Class of 2011
- Matt Lucena, 1995 U.S. Open Tennis Mixed Doubles champion with Meredith McGrath, and NCAA men's tennis doubles champion at the University of California in 1990 with Doug Eisenman and with Bent-Ove Pedersen in 1991, Class of 1988
- George Maderos, former National Football League player with the San Francisco 49ers, Class of 1951
- Vance McHenry, former professional baseball player with the Seattle Mariners
- Jake McLaughlin, actor, Quantico (2015-2018), Believe (2014)
- Brett Ratliff, National Football League player with the New York Jets and Cleveland Browns, Class of 2003
- Jason Ross, seven-time Emmy Award-winning comedic writer formerly of The Daily Show; currently with The Tonight Show Starring Jimmy Fallon
- Roque Santos, Olympic swimmer (Barcelona 1992), Class of 1986
- Donovan Scott, television and film actor, Class of 1966
- Mike Sherrard, former National Football League player with the Dallas Cowboys, San Francisco 49ers, New York Giants and Denver Broncos, Class of 1981
- Gentry Stein, Yoyo World Champion
- Bill Striegel, former National Football League player with the Philadelphia Eagles, Boston Patriots and Oakland Raiders, Class of 1954
