= Burl Toler =

American football official (1928–2009)

- Born: Burl Abron Toler; May 9, 1928; Memphis, Tennessee, U.S.
- Died: August 16, 2009 (aged 81); Castro Valley, California, U.S.
- Occupation: American football official in the NFL
- Notable work: Inductee in the Bay Area Sports Hall of Fame

Burl Abron Toler Sr. (May 9, 1928 – August 16, 2009) was an American football official in the National Football League (NFL) for 25 seasons from 1965 to 1989. He was a field judge and head linesman throughout his career and is most notable for being the first African-American official in the NFL. He also officiated in one Super Bowl, Super Bowl XIV in 1980, and wore the uniform number 37 for most of his career, except for the 1979–81 period, when officials were numbered by position. Toler wore number 18 for those three seasons.

On April 21, 2008, Toler Sr. was inducted into the Bay Area Sports Hall of Fame. Several years after his death, on May 9, 2017, the University of San Francisco renamed one of the campus's student dormitories in his honor.

== College career ==
Toler was born in Memphis, Tennessee, in 1928. He attended the University of San Francisco and was a linebacker. Despite his physical gifts and strapping size, Toler never even played a down of prep football at Manassas High School in Memphis. However, he quickly emerged as a dominant force once recruited to the Bay Area. While at City College of San Francisco, Toler teamed with the future Dons teammate and NFL Hall-of-Famer Ollie Matson to lead the 1948 City College of San Francisco Rams football team to the "mythical" junior college national championship. He was a member of the 1951 undefeated Dons football team of which three of his teammates would later be enshrined into the Pro Football Hall of Fame after successful careers in the NFL: Gino Marchetti, Ollie Matson, and Bob St. Clair. Toler earned his degree in science from USF in 1952 and added a master's in 1966.

== Professional career ==
=== Professional playing career ===
Toler was a ninth-round draft pick (number 105 overall) for the Cleveland Browns. He seriously injured his knee during a college all-star game that ended his football playing career, so he decided to become an official instead. After retiring as an NFL official in 1990, he was a game observer for the league, which involved grading officials, for eight years.

=== Professional officiating career ===
Toler was the first African-American to serve as a field official in a major American professional sports league when he was appointed by the NFL as a head linesman before the 1965 season.

Toler was the head linesman for the 1982 AFC Championship Game between the San Diego Chargers and Cincinnati Bengals at Cincinnati's Riverfront Stadium. The game was played under the coldest wind chill temperature in NFL history. The air temperature was −9 °F (−23 °C), but the wind chill was −59 °F (−51 °C). The game later became known in NFL lore as the "Freezer Bowl". He was also the first black man to be an official in Super Bowl history.

== After football ==
=== Educational career ===
Toler worked for 17 years at Benjamin Franklin Middle School in San Francisco as a teacher and as the district's first African American secondary school principal. The former Ben Franklin Middle School campus, now the home of two charter schools (Gateway High School and KIPP SF Bay Academy), was renamed in his honor on October 22, 2006.

Toler was also on the Board of Trustees of his alma mater the University of San Francisco from 1987 until 1998.

== Personal life ==
Toler was married in 1952 and had six children with his wife Melvia. He has eight grandchildren and two brothers, and one sister.

Toler, along with Hall of Famer and Olympian Ollie Matson were initiated into the Kappa Alpha Psi fraternity (Gamma Alpha chapter) on April 17, 1950. He died in Castro Valley, California on August 16, 2009.

His son, Burl Toler II, played football at the University of California, Berkeley from 1974-1977, and was a two-year starter at linebacker. His grandson, Burl Toler III, is currently an American football coach at UCLA. As a player, he was signed by the San Jose SaberCats of the Arena Football League on October 17, 2006, and spent several months on NFL team rosters from 2006 to 2008.
