= 1951 Stetson Hatters football team =

American college football season

1951 Stetson Hatters football
- Team portrait with players wearing Stetson hats

Tangerine Bowl champion

Tangerine Bowl, W 35–20 vs. Arkansas State
- Conference: Independent
- Record: 8–1–2
- Head coach: Joe McMullen (2nd season)
- Home stadium: DeLand Municipal Stadium

1951 Southern college football independents records
	Conf.			Overall
Team	W	L	T	W		L		T
No. 13 Virginia		–		8	–	1	–	0
Maryland State		–		7	–	1	–	0
Arkansas State		–		10	–	2	–	0
Stetson		–		8	–	1	–	2
Florida State		–		6	–	2	–	0
Northeast Louisiana State		–		6	–	2	–	0
Texas Southern		–		7	–	3	–	1
Miami (FL)		–		8	–	3	–	0
Tampa		–		7	–	3	–	1
Delaware		–		5	–	3	–	0
Memphis State		–		5	–	3	–	0
Sewanee		–		5	–	3	–	0
McNeese State		–		5	–	4	–	1
Louisville		–		5	–	4	–	0
Chattanooga		–		6	–	5	–	0
Grambling		–		4	–	5	–	1
Navy		–		2	–	6	–	1
Delta State		–		1	–	8	–	0
Rankings from AP Poll

The 1951 Stetson Hatters football team was an American football team that represented Stetson University as an independent during the 1951 college football season. In their second and final year under head coach Joe McMullen, the Hatters compiled an 8–1–2 record and outscored opponents by a total of 340 to 122. They were invited to the Tangerine Bowl, where they beat Arkansas State. It was the highest scoring team up to that point in Stetson football history. The team's sole loss was to Florida State by a 13–10 score as the Seminoles blocked a punt and returned the ball for the winning touchdown in the fourth quarter.

Stetson' offense, run out of a winged T formation, was known as a "versatile and deceptive" group led by senior quarterback Bill Johnson and end Dave Laude. Jay Pattee was the team's assistant coach.

McMullen resigned as head coach in June 1952 to become head coach and athletic director at Washington & Jefferson in Pennsylvania. The Hatters compiled a 16–3–2 record (.810) in their two years under McMullen.

The Hatters played their home football games at DeLand Municipal Stadium in DeLand, Florida.

== Schedule ==
Date	Time	Opponent	Site	Result	Attendance	Source
September 22	8:00 p.m.	Patrick Field	DeLand Municipal Stadium; DeLand, FL	W 70–0	3,500	
September 29	2:00 p.m.	at Jacksonville NAS	Jacksonville, FL	W 42–0		
October 12		at Furman	Sirrine Stadium; Greenville, SC	W 21–20	4,500	
October 20	8:00 p.m.	Tampa	DeLand Municipal Stadium; DeLand, FL	T 14–14		
October 27		at Florida State	Doak Campbell Stadium; Tallahassee, FL	L 10–13	13,700	
November 3		at Erskine	Greenwood, SC	W 54–0		
November 10	8:00 p.m.	Richmond	DeLand Municipal Stadium; DeLand, FL	W 19–14		
November 17		at Wofford	Spartanburg, SC	T 7–7		
November 24		Livingston	DeLand Municipal Stadium; DeLand, FL	W 42–20		
December 1	2:30 p.m.	Eastern Kentucky^{†}	DeLand Municipal Stadium; DeLand, FL	W 26–14		
January 1	8:00 p.m.	vs. Arkansas State	Tangerine Bowl; Orlando, Florida (Tangerine Bowl)	W 35–20	12,500	
^{†}Homecoming; All times are in Eastern time

== Statistics and awards ==
Quarterback Bill Johnson

The Hatters tallied 3,653 yards of total offense (excluding the Tangerine Bowl) consisting of 2,250 rushing yards and 1,403 passing yards. On defense, they gave up 1,881 yards of total offense, including 928 rushing yards and 953 passing yards. The individual leaders during the regular season included:

- Quarterback Bill Johnson completed 87 of 175 passes for 1,314 yards, nine touchdowns, and 12 interceptions. Johnson also tallied 128 rushing yards to lead the team with 1,314 yards of total offense. Johnson also received the Phil Jochem award as the team's outstanding player.
- Halfback Bobby Marks led the team with 561 rushing yards on 86 carries, an average of 6.5 yards per carry.
- End Dave Laude was the team's leading receiver with 20 receptions for 276 yards. Laude also received the DeLand Elks' cup as the team's most valuable lineman.
- Halfback Fulmer Armstrong led the team in scoring with 10 touchdowns for 60 points. Armstrong also led the team in punting with an average of 39.3 yards on 28 punts.
- Halfback Herb Werner ranked second on the team in scoring with 54 points on nine touchdowns.

B. J. Leathers received that team's Joe McMullen "60-Minute Man Award" as the player who saw the most action during the 1951 season.

== Roster ==
Thirty-two members of the team were awarded varsity letters at the end of the 1951 season. The letter winners included:

- Charles Appel, Miami Beach, Florida
- Fulmer Armstrong, senior, DeLand, Florida
- Henry Boyer, Neptune Beach, Florida
- Kermit Coble, senior, Greensboro, North Carolina
- Al Daub, Rutherford, New Jersey
- Ron DeLilla, Rutherford, New Jersey
- Ron Fazekas, Buffalo, New York
- Robert Freeze, Clearwater, Florida
- Jerry Gallagher, Lake Worth, Florida
- Tom Gibson, Miami, Florida
- Walt Golde, Rutherford, New Jersey
- Willi Han, Torrington, Connecticut
- Dick Hendry, senior, Ft. Myers, Florida
- Clarence Hughes, senior, Daytona Beach, Florida
- George Jochem, Miami, Florida
- Bill Johnson, senior, Waterville, Ohio
- Jim King, St. Petersburg, Florida
- Red Lonsinger, Des Plaines, Illinois
- Earl Looman, Fremont, Ohio (later an NFL draft pick)
- Don Martin, senior, Toledo, Ohio
- Lou Paar, Buffalo, New York
- Sonny Parrish, Miami, Florida
- Bill Phillips, Daytona Beach, Florida
- Joe Raffale, West New York, New Jersey
- Al Sappia, Ridgefield, New Jersey
- Frank Singletary, Remberton, Georgia
- Guido Tambur, Toledo
- Jim Yonga, Miami, Florida

The team's manager, George Wilde of West Palm Beach, was also awarded a letter.
