= Pres Mull =

American football player and coach (1922–2005)

- Mull pictured in The Rhododendron 1952, Appalachian State yearbook

Biographical details
- Born: August 28, 1922; Marion, North Carolina, U.S.
- Died: June 30, 2005 (aged 82); Chapel Hill, North Carolina, U.S.

Playing career
- 1946: Appalachian State

Coaching career (HC unless noted)
- 1951: Appalachian State
- 1954–1958: Lexington HS (NC)
- 1959–1961: Catawba
- 1962–1973: Lexington HS (NC)

Head coaching record
- Overall: 13–26–1 (college); 121–56–8 (high school)

Presnell Alfonzo "Pres" Mull^{[n1]} (August 28, 1922 – June 30, 2005) was an American football player and coach. He served as the head football coach at Appalachian State Teachers College—now known as Appalachian State University—for one season in 1951 and at Catawba College from 1959 to 1961, compiling a career college football record of 13–26–1.

== Biography ==
Mull was born in Marion, North Carolina in 1922 to Horace and Estelle (Houck) Mull. He graduated from Pleasant Garden High School where he played basketball. Mull graduated from Appalachian State Teacher's College in 1947, after having served as a reconnaissance pilot in World War II. Mull served as head football coach for multiple local high schools before getting the position at Appalachian State University in 1951 when incumbent coach E. C. Duggins left to do navy service. He also served as assistant football coach at the University for multiple seasons, along with teaching science courses.

Mull moved to Lexington, North Carolina in 1954 after his application for head football coach at Lexington High School was successful. His team, the Yellow Jackets went 9–1 in its first season, greatly improving over previous seasons. Mull also coached at Catawba College from 1959 to 1961, but later returned to Lexington where he continued coaching until 1973. He coached in the North Carolina High Schools All-Star game in 1971. He was also a longtime science teacher and athletic director at the school. He retired in 1984 and lived in Lexington up until 2004, when he moved to Chapel Hill, North Carolina.

Mull was honored by being named one of the inaugural members of the Distinguished Alumni of Appalachian State University along with inductions into the state of North Carolina, Davidson County and North Carolina Athletic Association Athletic Halls of Fame. Mull also served 11 years on the Lexington Planning and Zoning Board, being appointed in 1972 and resigning in 1986.

Mull died in 2005 at the University of North Carolina, Chapel Hill hospital after a brief illness. He was married to Elsie Spratt for 60 years at his death. He had four daughters, one which predeceased him. His wife, Elsie died shortly after him, on July 24, 2005. Mull was described in multiple articles as a "legend" and someone "[that] you would not hear anyone bad about" that was a "gentleman's gentleman on and off the field". He was a member of the United Methodist Church.

== Head coaching record ==
=== College ===
Year	Team	Overall	Conference	Standing	Bowl/playoffs
Appalachian State Mountaineers (North State Conference) (1951)
1951	Appalachian State	6–3	3–3	4th	
Appalachian State:		6–3	3–3		
Catawba Indians (North State Conference / Carolinas Conference) (1959–1961)
1959	Catawba	2–7–1	2–4	5th	
1960	Catawba	2–9	2–4	T–4th	
1961	Catawba	3–7	3–4	T–5th	
Catawba:		7–23–1	7–12		
Total:		13–26–1			

== Notes ==
- ^[n1]Name also given as "Preston" and "Press"
