= Andy Gustafson =

American football player, coach, and administrator (1903–1979)

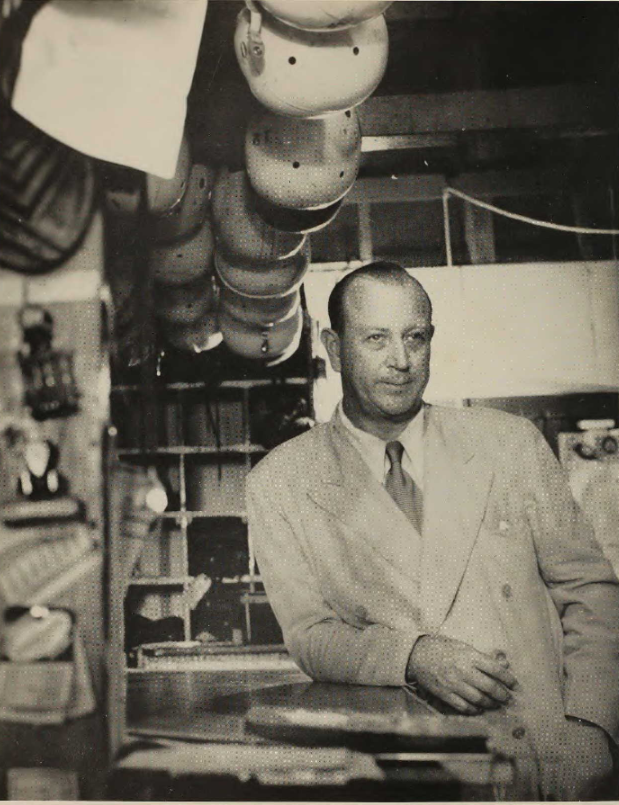
- Gustafson from 1950 Ibis

Biographical details
- Born: April 3, 1903; Aurora, Illinois, U.S.
- Died: January 7, 1979 (aged 75); Coral Gables, Florida, U.S.

Playing career
- 1923–1925: Pittsburgh
- Position: Halfback

Coaching career (HC unless noted)
- 1926–1929: VPI
- 1930–1933: Pittsburgh (backfield)
- 1934–1940: Dartmouth (backfield)
- 1941–1947: Army (backfield)
- 1948–1963: Miami (FL)

Administrative career (AD unless noted)
- 1963–1968: Miami (FL)

Head coaching record
- Overall: 115–78–4
- Bowls: 1–3
- College Football Hall of Fame; Inducted in 1985 (profile)

Andrew Gustafson (April 3, 1903 – January 7, 1979) was an American college football player, coach, and athletics administrator. He served as the head football coach at Virginia Agricultural and Mechanical College and Polytechnic Institute (VPI)—now Virginia Tech—from 1926 to 1929 and the University of Miami from 1948 to 1963, compiling a career head coaching record of 115–78–4. Gustafson was also the athletic director at Miami from 1963 to 1968. He was inducted into the College Football Hall of Fame as a coach in 1985.

== Early life and playing career ==
Gustafson was born in Aurora, Illinois. As a halfback at the University of Pittsburgh, Gustafson scored the first touchdown ever in Pitt Stadium in 1925 against Washington and Lee.

== Coaching career ==
Gustafson served as the head football coach of Virginia Tech from 1926 to 1929, where he compiled a 22–13–1 record.

Gustafson is considered one of the University of Miami's most successful coaches, with a record of 93–65–3 (.587). He led the Hurricanes to four seasons of eight wins or more and was the longest serving coach in school history. He is currently a member of the University of Miami Sports Hall of Fame. He also served as the athletic director of the school, following his retirement as a head coach.

== Head coaching record ==
Year	Team	Overall	Conference	Standing	Bowl/playoffs	Coaches^{#}	AP^{°}
VPI Gobblers (Southern Conference) (1926–1929)
1926	VPI	5–3–1	3–2–1	T–7th			
1927	VPI	5–4	2–3	T–12th			
1928	VPI	7–2	4–1	4th			
1929	VPI	5–4	2–3	13th			
VPI:		22–13–1	11–9–1				
Miami Hurricanes (NCAA University Division independent) (1948–1963)
1948	Miami	4–6					
1949	Miami	6–3					
1950	Miami	9–1–1			L Orange	13	15
1951	Miami	8–3			W Gator		
1952	Miami	4–7					
1953	Miami	4–5					
1954	Miami	8–1				9	11
1955	Miami	6–3				18	14
1956	Miami	8–1–1				6	6
1957	Miami	5–4–1					
1958	Miami	2–8					
1959	Miami	6–4					
1960	Miami	6–4					
1961	Miami	7–4			L Liberty	19	
1962	Miami	7–4			L Gotham	18	
1963	Miami	3–7					
Miami:		93–65–3					
Total:		115–78–4					
