= 1951 Jacksonville State Gamecocks football team =

American college football season

1951 Jacksonville State Gamecocks football
- Conference: Alabama Intercollegiate Conference
- Record: 3–3–2 (2–0 AIC)
- Head coach: Don Salls (6th season)
- Home stadium: College Bowl

The 1951 Jacksonville State Gamecocks football team represented Jacksonville State Teachers College (now known as Jacksonville State University) as a member of the Alabama Intercollegiate Conference (AIC) during the 1951 college football season. Led by sixth-year head coach Don Salls, the Gamecocks compiled an overall record of 3–3–2 with a mark of 2–0 in conference play.

== Schedule ==
Date	Opponent	Site	Result	Source
September 21	Louisiana College*	College Bowl; Jacksonville, AL	L 0–6	
September 29	Maryville (TN)*	College Bowl; Jacksonville, AL	W 26–0	
October 6	at Tampa*	Phillips Field; Tampa, FL	L 0–40	
October 13	at Troy State	Veterans Memorial Stadium; Troy, AL (rivalry)	W 13–7	
October 27	Austin Peay*	College Bowl; Jacksonville, AL	T 6–6	
November 3	at South Georgia*	Douglas, GA	L 0–7	
November 17	Florence State	College Bowl; Jacksonville, AL	W 13–6	
November 21	Howard (AL)*	College Bowl; Jacksonville, AL (rivalry)	T 19–19	
*Non-conference game
