= Willard S. Jones =

American football coach

Playing career

Football
- c. 1945: Morgan State

Basketball
- c. 1945: Morgan State
- Position: Guard (basketball)

Coaching career (HC unless noted)

Football
- 1951–1952: Delaware State

Head coaching record
- Overall: 3–14

Willard Sylvester Jones was an American college football coach. He served as the head football coach at Delaware State University from 1951 to 1952, compiling a record of 3–14. A native of Wilmington, Delaware, Jones attended Morgan State College—now known as Morgan State University—where he played football and basketball.

== Head coaching record ==
Year	Team	Overall	Conference	Standing	Bowl/playoffs
Delaware State Hornets (Central Intercollegiate Athletic Association) (1952)
1951	Delaware State	2–7	2–4	13th	
1952	Delaware State	1–7	1–5	13th	
Delaware State:		3–14	3–9		
Total:		3–14			
