= Forrest England =

American football coach and college athletics administrator

Biographical details
- Born: October 29, 1912; Vandalia, Illinois, U.S.
- Died: June 25, 2002 (aged 89); Toledo, Ohio, U.S.
- Education: Illinois College; University of Missouri

Coaching career (HC unless noted)
- 1935: Perry HS (IL)
- 1936: Waverly HS (IL)
- 1937–1940: Maroa HS (IL)
- 1941: Jacksonville, HS (IL)
- 1942–1945: University City HS (MO)
- 1946–1953: Arkansas State
- 1954–1955: Toledo

Administrative career (AD unless noted)
- 1954–1957: Toledo

Head coaching record
- Overall: 57–29–11 (college)
- Bowls: 1–2–1

Forrest William "Frosty" England (October 29, 1912 – June 25, 2002) was an American football coach and college athletic administrator. He served as the head football coach at Arkansas State College—now known as Arkansas State University—from 1946 to 1953 and at the University of Toledo from 1954 to 1955, compiling a career college football head coaching record of 57–29–11.

== Early life ==
England was born in Vandalia, Illinois on October 29, 1912 to William J. and Nora L. (Weekly) England. He earned a bachelor's degree from Illinois College and a master's degree from the University of Missouri. In 1935, he married Lois G. Batterton, whom he met when they were students at Illinois College. They had two sons.

== Coaching ==
England coached and taught at high schools in Perry, Waverly, Maroa, and Jacksonville, Illinois, and University City, Missouri before entering the college ranks with Arkansas State University in 1946. He had seven winning seasons in his eight years as head coach, turning around a program that had only one winning season in the 15 years prior to his arrival. His 1953 Arkansas State team went undefeated and played East Texas State to a tie in the 1954 Tangerine Bowl. He was the author of the book Coaching the T Formation: A Veritable Bible of T Formation Coaching Information for Coaches and Players published in 1948.

On January 19, 1954, England was named head football coach and athletic director at the University of Toledo. In his first season at Toledo, the Rockets, led by Mel Triplett and George Machoukas, went 6–2–1. The following year, England suffered his first losing season as head coach. In May 1956, England was given a year's leave from his coaching responsibilities due to a heart attack, but continued his duties as athletic director. Toledo went 1–7–1 in 1956 and England and his interim replacement, Jack Morton, were both fired at the end of the season.

== Later life ==
After retiring from coaching he had a career in real estate. He was vice president of Grogan Realty Inc. for 24 years before forming his own firm, Frosty England Co., in 1981. He retired in 2001.

In 1984, the football field at Illinois College was named England Field in honor of England and his wife, Lois.

England died on June 25, 2002 at a nursing home in Toledo.

== Head coaching record ==
=== College ===
Year	Team	Overall	Conference	Standing	Bowl/playoffs
Arkansas State Indians (Arkansas Intercollegiate Conference) (1946–1950)
1946	Arkansas State	4–3–3			
1947	Arkansas State	4–2–3			
1948	Arkansas State	4–4–1			
1949	Arkansas State	4–5			
1950	Arkansas State	6–3			
Arkansas State Indians (Independent) (1951–1953)
1951	Arkansas State	10–2			W Refrigerator, L Tangerine
1952	Arkansas State	8–3			L Refrigerator
1953	Arkansas State	8–0–2			T Tangerine
Arkansas State:		48–22–9			
Toledo Rockets (Mid-American Conference) (1954–1955)
1954	Toledo	6–2–1	3–2	4th	
1955	Toledo	3–5–1	2–4	5th	
Toledo:		9–7–2	5–6		
Total:		57–29–11			
