= 1951 Troy State Red Wave football team =

American college football season

1951 Troy State Red Wave football
- Conference: Alabama Intercollegiate Conference
- Record: 2–7 (0–3 AIC)
- Head coach: Jim Grantham (1st season)
- Home stadium: Veterans Memorial Stadium

The 1951 Troy State Red Wave football team represented Troy State Teachers College (now known as Troy University) as a member of the Alabama Intercollegiate Conference (AIC) during the 1951 college football season. Led by first-year head coach Jim Grantham, the Red Wave compiled an overall record of 2–7, with a mark of 0–3 in conference play.

== Schedule ==
| Date | Opponent | Site | Result | Attendance | Source |
|---|---|---|---|---|---|
| September 29 | at Florida State* | Doak Campbell Stadium; Tallahassee, FL | L 0–40 | 8,459 | |
| October 6 | Southwestern Louisiana* | Veterans Memorial Stadium; Troy, AL | L 7–44 | | |
| October 13 | Jacksonville State | Veterans Memorial Stadium; Troy, AL (rivalry) | L 7–13 | | |
| October 20 | Arkansas State* | Veterans Memorial Stadium; Troy, AL | L 0–39 | | |
| October 27 | Florence State | Veterans Memorial Stadium; Troy, AL | L 6–39 | | |
| November 2 | at Southeastern Louisiana* | Strawberry Stadium; Hammond, LA | L 0–71 | | |
| November 10 | at Austin Peay* | Municipal Stadium; Clarksville, TN | W 20–13 | | |
| November 17 | at Livingston State | McConnell Field; Livingston, AL | L 7–13 | | |
| November 22 | Miami Air Base* | Veterans Memorial Stadium; Troy, AL | W 33–13 | | |
*Non-conference game
