= 1951 Florence State Lions football team =

American college football season

1951 Florence State Lions football
- Conference: Alabama Intercollegiate Conference
- Record: 6–3 (2–1 AIC)
- Head coach: Hal Self (3rd season)
- Captains: L. L. Whitten; Sam Hyde; Durell Mock
- Home stadium: Coffee Stadium

The 1951 Florence State Lions football team represented Florence State Teacher's College—now known as the University of North Alabama—as a member of the Alabama Intercollegiate Conference (AIC) during the 1951 college football season. Led by third-year head coach Hal Self, the Lions compiled an overall record of 6–3 with a mark of 2–1 in conference play. Florence State played home games at Coffee Stadium in Florence, Alabama. George Lindsey, who starred as Goober on the Andy Griffith Show on CBS, was one of the Lions two quarterbacks.

== Schedule ==
Date	Time	Opponent	Site	Result	Source
September 23	7:30 p.m.	Union (TN)*	Coffee Stadium; Florence, AL	W 44–0	
September 29	7:30 p.m.	Austin Peay*	Coffee Stadium; Florence, AL	W 27–7	
October 6	7:30 p.m.	vs. Howard (AL)*	Decatur Stadium; Decatur, AL	W 30–6	
October 13		at Arkansas State*	Kays Stadium; Jonesboro, AR	L 13–35	
October 20	7:30 p.m.	Livingston^{†}	Coffee Stadium; Florence, AL (rivalry)	W 12–9	
October 27		at Troy State	Veterans Memorial Stadium; Troy, AL	W 31–6	
November 3	7:30 p.m.	Middle Tennessee*	Coffee Stadium; Florence, AL	L 0–21	
November 10	7:30 p.m.	Arkansas State Teachers*	Coffee Stadium; Florence, AL	W 32–20	
November 17		at Jacksonville State	College Bowl; Jacksonville, AL	L 6–13	
*Non-conference game; ^{†}Homecoming; All times are in Central time

== Roster ==
1951 Florence State Lions Football
Quarterbacks: Joe Elmore; George Lindsey; Running backs: L. L. Whitten; Alton "Monk" Romine; Receivers: Harlon Hill; Linemen: Durell Mock; Bobby Wade; Tackles: Sam Hyde	Position Not Listed: John O. Braswell; Edward Burrows; Bill Farris; Carl Garrison; James Glass; James Hennessey; James Hodges; Caldwell Hollingsworth; Orlon J. Hyde; Buddy Moore; William Don Parker; Bimol Poole; Herbert Sanford; Nolan Sherrill; Charles Wallace; Ray Wallace; Wilson Williamson
