= 1952 Tangerine Bowl =

American college football game

Stetson Hatters	Arkansas State Indians
(7–1–2)	(10–1)
Independent	Independent
35	20
Head coach: Joe McMullen	Head coach: Forrest England
	1	2	3	4	Total
Stetson	0	7	21	7	35
Arkansas State	7	6	0	7	20
- Date: January 1, 1952
- Season: 1951
- Stadium: Tangerine Bowl
- Location: Orlando, Florida
- MVP: Bill Johnson, Stetson Dave Laude, Stetson
- Attendance: 12,500

The 1952 Tangerine Bowl was an American college football bowl game played after the 1951 season, on January 1, 1952, at the Tangerine Bowl stadium in Orlando, Florida. The Stetson Hatters with a record of 7–1–2 played the Arkansas State Indians (now the Arkansas State Red Wolves) with a record of 10–1. Stetson won by a score of 35–20.

== Game summary ==
The first quarter of the game saw only one score; a 5-yard rush for an Arkansas State touchdown. The quarter ended 7–0, Indians.

The second quarter featured minimal scoring as well; Stetson tied the game after a 2–yard pass to make it 7–7, though the Indians quickly recovered and scored their second touchdown to give them back the lead. The extra point was missed, however, and the game went to halftime 13–7 with Arkansas State in the lead.

Stetson's offense took off in the third quarter, finding the end zone on three occasions: two passes (23 and 30 yards) and a 5–yard rush. All extra points were converted, and the Hatters took a 28–13 lead into the final quarter after their defense pitched a shutout in the third quarter.

The fourth quarter saw both teams score one final time, both touchdowns, and the game finished 35–20 in favor of Stetson.

This was the Hatters' first bowl victory in their first bowl appearance (and the only appearance to date), making them 1–0 overall in bowl games.

== Statistics ==
Statistics	Arkansas State	Stetson
First downs	21	15
Rushing yards	261	193
Passes attempted	15	20
Passes completed	7	9
Passes intercepted by	2	3
Passing yards	77	110
Yards penalized	31	65
Punts–average	2–32.5	5–33.6
Fumbles lost	2	0
