= 1951 Appalachian State Mountaineers football team =

American college football season

1951 Appalachian State Mountaineers football
- Conference: North State Conference
- Record: 6–3 (3–3 NSC)
- Head coach: Pres Mull (1st season)
- Home stadium: College Field

1951 North State Conference football standings
	Conf.					Overall
Team	W		L		T	W		L		T
Lenoir Rhyne $	6	–	0	–	0	10	–	1	–	0
Elon	4	–	2	–	0	6	–	3	–	0
Catawba	3	–	2	–	0	5	–	5	–	0
Appalachian State	3	–	3	–	0	6	–	3	–	0
East Carolina	1	–	4	–	0	4	–	6	–	0
Western Carolina	1	–	4	–	0	3	–	6	–	0
Guilford	1	–	4	–	0	1	–	7	–	0
$ – Conference champion

The 1951 Appalachian State Mountaineers football team was an American football team that represented Appalachian State Teachers College (now known as Appalachian State University) as a member of the North State Conference during the 1951 college football season. In their only year under head coach Pres Mull, the Mountaineers compiled an overall record of 6–3, with a mark of 3–3 in conference play, and finished fourth in the NSC.

== Schedule ==
Date	Time	Opponent	Site	Result	Attendance	Source
September 15		vs. Guilford	Bowman Gray Stadium; Winston-Salem, NC	W 20–0	5,000	
September 22		Western Carolina	College Field; Boone, NC (rivalry)	W 26–6		
September 29		at Elon	Burlington Municipal Stadium; Burlington, NC	L 6–20		
October 6	7:00 p.m.	Lenoir Rhyne	College Field; Boone, NC	L 0–20	6,500	
October 13		vs. Catawba	Bowman Gray Stadium; Winston-Salem, NC	L 0–2		
October 26		at Tampa*	Phillips Field; Tampa, FL	W 14–13	9,000	
November 3		at East Carolina	College Stadium; Greenville, NC	W 24–20		
November 10		Erskine*	College Field; Boone, NC	W 20–0		
November 17		Newberry*	College Field; Boone, NC	W 18–6		
*Non-conference game; All times are in Eastern time
