= 1951 Tampa Spartans football team =

American college football season

1951 Tampa Spartans football

Brandeis Classic champion

Brandeis Classic, W 7–0 vs. Brandeis
- Conference: Independent
- Record: 7–3–1
- Head coach: Frank Sinkwich (2nd season)
- Home stadium: Phillips Field

1951 Southern college football independents records
	Conf.			Overall
Team	W	L	T	W		L		T
No. 13 Virginia		–		8	–	1	–	0
Maryland State		–		7	–	1	–	0
Arkansas State		–		10	–	2	–	0
Stetson		–		8	–	1	–	2
Florida State		–		6	–	2	–	0
Northeast Louisiana State		–		6	–	2	–	0
Miami (FL)		–		8	–	3	–	0
Tampa		–		7	–	3	–	1
Delaware		–		5	–	3	–	0
Memphis State		–		5	–	3	–	0
Sewanee		–		5	–	3	–	0
McNeese State		–		5	–	4	–	1
Louisville		–		5	–	4	–	0
Chattanooga		–		6	–	5	–	0
Navy		–		2	–	6	–	1
Delta State		–		1	–	8	–	0
Rankings from AP Poll

The 1951 Tampa Spartans football team represented the University of Tampa in the 1951 college football season. It was the Spartans' 15th season. The team was led by head coach Frank Sinkwich, in his second year, and played their home games at Phillips Field in Tampa, Florida. They finished with a record of seven wins, three losses and one tie (7–3–1).

A week after they opened the season with a 72–0 victory over Patrick Air Force Base at home, the Spartans lost their first road game of the season at Bradley 32–6. The next Friday, Tampa lost their second consecutive game on the road. This time, Wofford overcame a 14–7 halftime deficit with a pair of third-quarter touchdowns in their 21–14 victory in Spartanburg. The Spartans then returned home and won games over Jacksonville State and Lenoir–Rhyne before they played Stetson to a 14–14 tie at DeLand after Tampa blocked a last-second field goal attempt by the Hatters. After a road loss at Appalachian State, the Spartans closed the season with three home games that included victories over Livingston State, South Georgia, and Florida State in the final home game of the season. Against the Seminoles, Tampa won in a 14–6 upset at Phillips Field before 12,500 fans.

In mid-November, Tampa accepted an invitation to compete in their first postseason game against Brandeis in the first Brandeis Classic at Miami Beach. Against the Judges, the Spartans won 7–0 after they scored their only points on an 18-yard John Lahosky touchdown pass to H. L. Hiers on their opening drive. In February 1952, Sinkwich resigned as head coach of the Spartans after only two seasons and entered private business.

== Schedule ==
Date	Time	Opponent	Site	Result	Attendance	Source
September 15		Patrick Field	Phillips Field; Tampa, FL	W 72–0	8,000	
September 22		at Bradley	Peoria Stadium; Peoria, IL	L 6–32	8,000	
September 28		at Wofford	Snyder Field; Spartanburg, SC	L 14–21	5,000	
October 6		Jacksonville State	Phillips Field; Tampa, FL	W 40–0	7,000	
October 13	8:00 p.m.	Lenoir Rhyne	Phillips Field; Tampa, FL	W 27–14	8,500	
October 20	8:00 p.m.	at Stetson	DeLand Municipal Stadium; DeLand, FL	T 14–14		
October 27		at Appalachian State	College Field; Boone, NC	L 13–14		
November 3		Livingston State^{†}	Phillips Field; Tampa, FL	W 28–13	6,500	
November 9		South Georgia	Phillips Field; Tampa, FL	W 54–13	5,000	
November 17	8:00 p.m.	Florida State	Phillips Field; Tampa, FL	W 14–6	12,000	
December 9		vs. Brandeis	Memorial Field; Miami Beach, FL (Brandeis Classic)	W 7–0	5,500	
^{†}Homecoming; All times are in Eastern time
