= 1951 McNeese State Cowboys football team =

American college football season

1951 McNeese State Cowboys football

Cosmopolitan Bowl, W 13–6 vs. Louisiana College
- Conference: Independent
- Record: 5–4–1
- Head coach: Albert I. Ratcliff (6th season)
- Home stadium: Killen Field

1951 Southern college football independents records
	Conf.			Overall
Team	W	L	T	W		L		T
No. 13 Virginia		–		8	–	1	–	0
Maryland State		–		7	–	1	–	0
Arkansas State		–		10	–	2	–	0
Stetson		–		8	–	1	–	2
Florida State		–		6	–	2	–	0
Northeast Louisiana State		–		6	–	2	–	0
Texas Southern		–		7	–	3	–	1
Miami (FL)		–		8	–	3	–	0
Tampa		–		7	–	3	–	1
Delaware		–		5	–	3	–	0
Memphis State		–		5	–	3	–	0
Sewanee		–		5	–	3	–	0
McNeese State		–		5	–	4	–	1
Louisville		–		5	–	4	–	0
Chattanooga		–		6	–	5	–	0
Grambling		–		4	–	5	–	1
Navy		–		2	–	6	–	1
Delta State		–		1	–	8	–	0
Rankings from AP Poll

The 1951 McNeese State Cowboys football team was an American football team that represented McNeese State College (now known as McNeese State University) as an independent during the 1951 college football season. In their sixth year under head coach Albert I. Ratcliff, the team compiled an overall record of 5–4–1. After the regular season, McNeese defeated Louisiana College in the Cosmopolitan Bowl.

== Schedule ==
Date	Opponent	Site	Result	Attendance	Source
September 22	Southwestern Louisiana	Killen Field; Lake Charles, LA (rivalry)	L 14–35	5,200	
September 29	at Stephen F. Austin	Memorial Stadium; Nacogdoches, TX	T 14–14	5,000	
October 6	Northwestern State	Killen Field; Lake Charles, LA (rivalry)	W 38–21		
October 13	at Northeast Louisiana State	Brown Stadium; Monroe, LA	W 25–13		
October 20	at Louisiana College	Alumni Field; Pineville, LA	L 21–27		
October 27	Southern State (AR)	Killen Field; Lake Charles, LA	W 35–14		
November 3	at Sam Houston State	Pritchett Field; Huntsville, TX	L 13–20	2,500	
November 10	Lamar Tech	Killen Field; Lake Charles, LA (rivalry)	W 13–7		
November 17	Southeastern Louisiana	Killen Field; Lake Charles, LA	L 6–9		
November 21	vs. Louisiana College	Bolton Stadium; Alexandria, LA (Cosmopolitan Bowl)	W 13–6	3,700	
