= Cosmopolitan Bowl =

1951 US college football bowl game

- Location: Alexandria, Louisiana

The Cosmopolitan Bowl was a one-time postseason college football bowl game held in December 1951 in Alexandria, Louisiana. The game featured McNeese State and Louisiana College. McNeese State won, 13–6.

== Game result ==
Date	Site	Winner		Loser		Ref
December 1, 1951	Alexandria, Louisiana	McNeese State	13	Louisiana College	6	
