= 1952 Gator Bowl =

American college football game

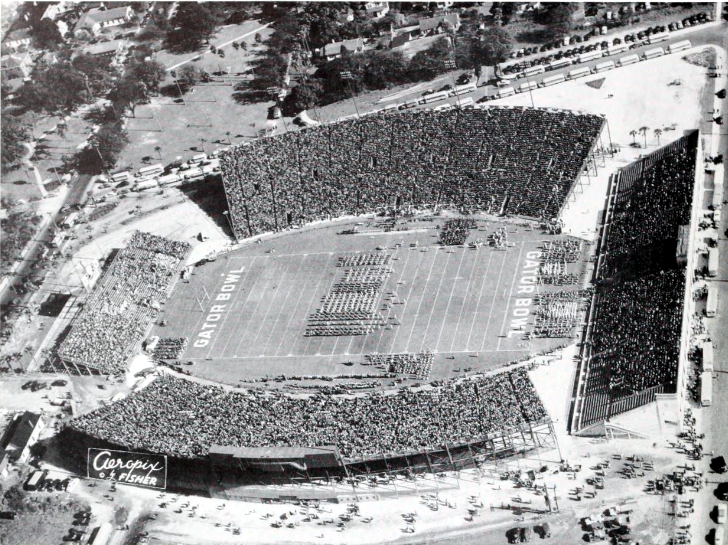
Miami Hurricanes	Clemson Tigers
(7–3)	(7–2)
Independent	SoCon
14	0
Head coach: Andy Gustafson	Head coach: Frank Howard
	AP 19
	1	2	3	4	Total
Miami	7	7	0	0	14
Clemson	0	0	0	0	0
- Date: January 1, 1952
- Season: 1951
- Stadium: Gator Bowl Stadium
- Location: Jacksonville, Florida
- MVP: HB Jim Dooley (Miami)
- Attendance: 37,208

The 1952 Gator Bowl was an American college football bowl game played on January 1, 1952, at Gator Bowl Stadium in Jacksonville, Florida. It was the seventh annual playing of the Gator Bowl. The game pitted the Miami Hurricanes against the Clemson Tigers

== Background ==
The Hurricanes, after losing their first game of the season to Tulane, won the next four games to lean into the AP rankings at #19 before facing #14 Kentucky. However, a 32–0 loss in Kentucky dropped them out of the rankings, though they did win three of their final four games to finish with seven regular season victories, a slight drop from the nine the previous season. This was their third bowl game in six years and first bowl game appearance outside of the Orange Bowl.

Clemson won the first three games of the season to rise to #16 in the polls before a matchup with #20 Pacific dropped them out, with a loss to South Carolina twelve days later making them 3–2. The Tigers would rebound to win their final four regular season games to finish 5th in the Southern Conference while finishing their fourth consecutive season .500 or better. This was their third bowl game in four seasons and second Gator bowl in three years.

== Game summary ==
Harry Mellios scored two touchdowns for Miami (the first from 11 yards out and the second from 2 yards out) in the first half, with the scores proving to be the difference in a game dominated by stagnation. Miami won the game despite having less first downs (5 to Clemson's 14), less rushing yards (119 to the Tigers' 145), less passing yards (55 to Clemson's 88), and more penalties and punts (four for 30 yards and 9 punts for 44.5 yards average). However, it was the four interceptions thrown by Clemson quarterback Billy Hair (all caught by MVP Jim Dooley, who played both offense and defense) that proved crucial to the victory.

The attendance for the game was 37,208.

== Aftermath ==
Miami was not invited to another bowl game until 1961 (though they did finish 6th ranked in the AP Poll in 1956). Their next Gator Bowl appearance would not be until 2000. Clemson left the Southern Conference after the game, joining the Atlantic Coast Conference in 1953. They were not invited to a bowl game again until 1957, with the next Gator Bowl appearance not being until 1977.
