= 1951 Delta State Statesmen football team =

American college football season

1951 Delta State Statesmen football
- Conference: Independent
- Record: 1–8
- Head coach: Gene Chadwick (4th season)
- Home stadium: Delta Field

1951 Southern college football independents records
	Conf.			Overall
Team	W	L	T	W		L		T
No. 13 Virginia		–		8	–	1	–	0
Maryland State		–		7	–	1	–	0
Arkansas State		–		10	–	2	–	0
Stetson		–		8	–	1	–	2
Florida State		–		6	–	2	–	0
Northeast Louisiana State		–		6	–	2	–	0
Texas Southern		–		7	–	3	–	1
Miami (FL)		–		8	–	3	–	0
Tampa		–		7	–	3	–	1
Delaware		–		5	–	3	–	0
Memphis State		–		5	–	3	–	0
Sewanee		–		5	–	3	–	0
McNeese State		–		5	–	4	–	1
Louisville		–		5	–	4	–	0
Chattanooga		–		6	–	5	–	0
Grambling		–		4	–	5	–	1
Navy		–		2	–	6	–	1
Delta State		–		1	–	8	–	0
Rankings from AP Poll

The 1951 Delta State Statesmen football team was an American football team that represented Delta State Teachers College (now known as the Delta State University) as an independent during the 1951 college football season. In their fourth year under head coach Gene Chadwick, the team compiled a 1–8 record.

== Schedule ==
Date	Opponent	Site	Result	Attendance	Source
September 16	at Ouachita Baptist	Arkadelphia, AR	W 12–0		
September 21	at No. 9 Alabama	Cramton Bowl; Montgomery, AL	L 0–89	9,000	
September 28	Northeast Louisiana State	Clarksdale, MS	L 20–32		
October 6	Arkansas State	Greenville High School field; Greenville, MS	L 0–43	2,500–3,000	
October 13	at Florida State	Doak Campbell Stadium; Tallahassee, FL	L 0–34	5,308	
October 20	Southwest Missouri State	Delta Field; Cleveland, MS	L 26–27		
October 27	at Murray State	Murray, KY	L 0–33	4,000	
November 3	at Western Kentucky	Bowling Green, KY	L 6–46		
November 17	at Southern State	Wilkins Stadium; Magnolia, AR	L 0–14		
Rankings from AP Poll released prior to the game
