= 1951 Chattanooga Moccasins football team =

American college football season

1951 Chattanooga Moccasins football
- Conference: Independent
- Record: 6–5
- Head coach: Scrappy Moore (21st season)
- Captain: Chester Lagod
- Home stadium: Chamberlain Field

1951 Southern college football independents records
	Conf.			Overall
Team	W	L	T	W		L		T
No. 13 Virginia		–		8	–	1	–	0
Maryland State		–		7	–	1	–	0
Arkansas State		–		10	–	2	–	0
Stetson		–		8	–	1	–	2
Florida State		–		6	–	2	–	0
Northeast Louisiana State		–		6	–	2	–	0
Texas Southern		–		7	–	3	–	1
Miami (FL)		–		8	–	3	–	0
Tampa		–		7	–	3	–	1
Delaware		–		5	–	3	–	0
Memphis State		–		5	–	3	–	0
Sewanee		–		5	–	3	–	0
McNeese State		–		5	–	4	–	1
Louisville		–		5	–	4	–	0
Chattanooga		–		6	–	5	–	0
Grambling		–		4	–	5	–	1
Navy		–		2	–	6	–	1
Delta State		–		1	–	8	–	0
Rankings from AP Poll

The 1951 Chattanooga Moccasins football team was an American football team that represented the University of Chattanooga (now known as the University of Tennessee at Chattanooga) as an independent during the 1951 college football season. In its 21st year under head coach Scrappy Moore, the team compiled a 6–5 record. The team was ranked at No. 81 in the 1951 Litkenhous Ratings.

== Schedule ==
Date	Time	Opponent	Site	Result	Attendance	Source
September 14		Newberry	Chamberlain Field; Chattanooga, TN	W 38–0		
September 21		Erskine	Chamberlain Field; Chattanooga, TN	W 53–6	3,000	
September 28		Abilene Christian	Chamberlain Field; Chattanooga, TN	W 33–7		
October 5	8:00 p.m.	Evansville	Chamberlain Field; Chattanooga, TN	W 75–7	8,500	
October 13		at No. 3 Tennessee	Shields–Watkins Field; Knoxville, TN	L 13–42	15,000	
October 20		at Dayton	UD Stadium; Dayton, OH	L 6–21		
October 26		Mississippi Southern	Chamberlain Field; Chattanooga, TN	W 19–7	11,500	
November 3		at Vanderbilt	Dudley Field; Nashville, TN	L 14–19		
November 9		at Miami (FL)	Burdine Stadium; Miami, FL	L 7–34		
November 17		at Memphis State	Crump Stadium; Memphis, TN	L 0–13	3,164	
November 22		North Texas State	Chamberlain Field; Chattanooga, TN	W 32–20	10,000	
Rankings from AP Poll released prior to the game; All times are in Central time
