= 1951 Maryland State Hawks football team =

American college football season

1951 Maryland State Hawks football

Furniture Bowl, W 40–0 vs. Shaw
- Conference: Independent
- Record: 7–1
- Head coach: Vernon McCain (3rd season)

1951 Southern college football independents records
	Conf.			Overall
Team	W	L	T	W		L		T
No. 13 Virginia		–		8	–	1	–	0
Maryland State		–		7	–	1	–	0
Arkansas State		–		10	–	2	–	0
Stetson		–		8	–	1	–	2
Florida State		–		6	–	2	–	0
Northeast Louisiana State		–		6	–	2	–	0
Texas Southern		–		7	–	3	–	1
Miami (FL)		–		8	–	3	–	0
Tampa		–		7	–	3	–	1
Delaware		–		5	–	3	–	0
Memphis State		–		5	–	3	–	0
Sewanee		–		5	–	3	–	0
McNeese State		–		5	–	4	–	1
Louisville		–		5	–	4	–	0
Chattanooga		–		6	–	5	–	0
Grambling		–		4	–	5	–	1
Navy		–		2	–	6	–	1
Delta State		–		1	–	8	–	0
Rankings from AP Poll

The 1951 Maryland State Hawks football team was an American football team that represented Maryland State College (now known as University of Maryland Eastern Shore) during the 1951 college football season. In their third season under head coach Vernon McCain, the team compiled an 7–1 record. Maryland State sole loss came on October 13 against Hampton, which snapped a 26-game winning streak dating back to the 1948 season.

== Schedule ==
Date	Time	Opponent	Site	Result	Attendance	Source
September 22		at Grambling	Ruston, LA	W 7–6		
September 29		vs. Wilberforce State	Norfolk, VA (Fish Bowl)	W 7–6	4,000	
October 6	2:00 p.m.	Brooklyn	Princess Anne, MD	W 52–0		
October 13	8:00 p.m.	at Hampton	Armstrong Field; Hampton, VA	L 0–20		
November 3	2:00 p.m.	at Delaware State	Dover, DE	W 18–6		
November 10		Wilkes	Princess Anne, MD	W 26–7		
November 17		Virginia Union^{†}	Princess Anne, MD	W 40–6	2,511	
November 22		vs. Shaw	Martinsville, VA (Furniture Bowl)	W 40–0	4,189	
^{†}Homecoming; All times are in Eastern time
