= 1951 Northeast Louisiana State Indians football team =

American college football season

1951 Northeast Louisiana State Indians football
- Conference: Independent
- Record: 6–2
- Head coach: James L. Malone (18th season)
- Home stadium: Brown Stadium

1951 Southern college football independents records
	Conf.			Overall
Team	W	L	T	W		L		T
No. 13 Virginia		–		8	–	1	–	0
Maryland State		–		7	–	1	–	0
Arkansas State		–		10	–	2	–	0
Stetson		–		8	–	1	–	2
Florida State		–		6	–	2	–	0
Northeast Louisiana State		–		6	–	2	–	0
Texas Southern		–		7	–	3	–	1
Miami (FL)		–		8	–	3	–	0
Tampa		–		7	–	3	–	1
Delaware		–		5	–	3	–	0
Memphis State		–		5	–	3	–	0
Sewanee		–		5	–	3	–	0
McNeese State		–		5	–	4	–	1
Louisville		–		5	–	4	–	0
Chattanooga		–		6	–	5	–	0
Grambling		–		4	–	5	–	1
Navy		–		2	–	6	–	1
Delta State		–		1	–	8	–	0
Rankings from AP Poll

The 1951 Northeast Louisiana State Indians football team was an American football team that represented Northeast Louisiana State College (now known as the University of Louisiana at Monroe) as an independent during the 1951 college football season. In their 18th year under head coach James L. Malone, the team compiled a 6–2 record.

This season was the first for the Indians as a senior college as Northeast Louisiana State College transformed from a two-year junior college to a four-year senior college in 1951.

== Schedule ==
Date	Opponent	Site	Result	Attendance	Source
September 15	at Southwestern Louisiana	McNaspy Stadium; Lafayette, LA (rivalry)	W 13–7		
September 22	Southeastern Louisiana	Brown Stadium; Monroe, LA	L 0–33	3,500	
September 28	at Delta State	Clarksdale, MS	W 32–20		
October 6	Livingston State	Brown Stadium; Monroe, LA	W 33–22		
October 13	McNeese State	Brown Stadium; Monroe, LA	L 13–25		
October 20	Ouachita Baptist	Brown Stadium; Monroe, LA	W 66–0		
November 10	Southeastern Oklahoma State	Brown Stadium; Monroe, LA	W 51–0		
November 17	Louisiana College	Brown Stadium; Monroe, LA	W 45–21		
