= 1951 Louisville Cardinals football team =

American college football season

1951 Louisville Cardinals football
- Conference: Independent
- Record: 5–4
- Head coach: Frank Camp (6th season)
- Home stadium: duPont Manual Stadium

1951 Southern college football independents records
	Conf.			Overall
Team	W	L	T	W		L		T
No. 13 Virginia		–		8	–	1	–	0
Maryland State		–		7	–	1	–	0
Arkansas State		–		10	–	2	–	0
Stetson		–		8	–	1	–	2
Florida State		–		6	–	2	–	0
Northeast Louisiana State		–		6	–	2	–	0
Texas Southern		–		7	–	3	–	1
Miami (FL)		–		8	–	3	–	0
Tampa		–		7	–	3	–	1
Delaware		–		5	–	3	–	0
Memphis State		–		5	–	3	–	0
Sewanee		–		5	–	3	–	0
McNeese State		–		5	–	4	–	1
Louisville		–		5	–	4	–	0
Chattanooga		–		6	–	5	–	0
Grambling		–		4	–	5	–	1
Navy		–		2	–	6	–	1
Delta State		–		1	–	8	–	0
Rankings from AP Poll

The 1951 Louisville Cardinals football team represented the University of Louisville as an independent during the 1951 college football season. In their sixth season under head coach Frank Camp, the Cardinals compiled a 5–4 record. Future National Football League (NFL) quarterback Johnny Unitas was in his freshman year on the team.

== Schedule ==
Date	Time	Opponent	Site	Result	Attendance	Source
September 29		at Wayne	University of Detroit Stadium; Detroit, MI	W 28–12	7,500	
October 5		Boston University	duPont Manual Stadium; Louisville, KY	L 7–39	10,000	
October 13	7:30 p.m.	at Cincinnati	Nippert Stadium; Cincinnati, OH (The Keg of Nails)	L 0–38	16,000	
October 19		Xavier	duPont Manual Stadium; Louisville, KY	L 6–47	6,000	
October 27		at St. Bonaventure	Forness Stadium; Olean, NY	L 21–22	6,500	
November 2		NC State	duPont Manual Stadium; Louisville, KY	W 26–2	1,000	
November 10		Houston	duPont Manual Stadium; Louisville, KY	W 35–28	2,500–3,000	
November 17		Washington and Lee^{†}	duPont Manual Stadium; Louisville, KY	W 14–7	6,000	
November 23		Mississippi Southern	duPont Manual Stadium; Louisville, KY	W 14–13	1,200	
^{†}Homecoming; All times are in Central time

== Team players in the NFL ==
Player	Position	Round	Pick	NFL club
John Brewer	Back	28	329	Philadelphia Eagles
