= 1951 Arkansas State Indians football team =

American college football season

1951 Arkansas State Indians football

Refrigerator Bowl champion

Refrigerator Bowl W 46–12 vs. Camp Breckinridge Tangerine Bowl, L 20–35 vs. Stetson
- Conference: Independent
- Record: 10–2
- Head coach: Forrest England (6th season)
- Home stadium: Kays Stadium

1951 Southern college football independents records
| | Conf. | | | Overall |
| Team | W | L | T | W | | L | | T |
|---|---|---|---|---|---|---|---|---|
| No. 13 Virginia | | – | | 8 | – | 1 | – | 0 |
| Maryland State | | – | | 7 | – | 1 | – | 0 |
| Arkansas State | | – | | 10 | – | 2 | – | 0 |
| Stetson | | – | | 8 | – | 1 | – | 2 |
| Florida State | | – | | 6 | – | 2 | – | 0 |
| Northeast Louisiana State | | – | | 6 | – | 2 | – | 0 |
| Miami (FL) | | – | | 8 | – | 3 | – | 0 |
| Tampa | | – | | 7 | – | 3 | – | 1 |
| Delaware | | – | | 5 | – | 3 | – | 0 |
| Memphis State | | – | | 5 | – | 3 | – | 0 |
| Sewanee | | – | | 5 | – | 3 | – | 0 |
| McNeese State | | – | | 5 | – | 4 | – | 1 |
| Louisville | | – | | 5 | – | 4 | – | 0 |
| Chattanooga | | – | | 6 | – | 5 | – | 0 |
| Navy | | – | | 2 | – | 6 | – | 1 |
| Delta State | | – | | 1 | – | 8 | – | 0 |
Rankings from AP Poll

The 1951 Arkansas State Indians football team was an American football team that represented Arkansas State College—now known as Arkansas State University—as an independent during the 1951 college football season. Led by sixth-year head coach Forrest England, the Indians compiled a record of 10–2. They were invited to the Refrigerator Bowl, where they beat Camp Breckinridge, and the Tangerine Bowl, where they lost to Stetson.

Arkansas State was ranked at No. 87 in the 1951 Litkenhous Ratings.

== Schedule ==
| Date | Time | Opponent | Site | Result | Attendance | Source |
|---|---|---|---|---|---|---|
| September 15 | | Memphis Navy | Kays Stadium; Jonesboro, AR | W 34–0 | | |
| September 22 | | at Mississippi State | Scott Field; Starkville, MS | L 0–32 | 4,500 | |
| September 29 | | at Arkansas Tech | Russellville, AR | W 46–6 | | |
| October 6 | | at Delta State | Greenville High School field; Greenville, MS | W 43–0 | 2,500–3,000 | |
| October 13 | | Florence State^{†} | Kays Stadium; Jonesboro, AR | W 35–13 | | |
| October 20 | | at Troy State | Veterans Memorial Stadium; Troy, AL | W 39–0 | | |
| October 26 | | vs. Corry Field | Haley Field; Blytheville, AR | W 53–0 | | |
| November 10 | | Pittsburg State | Kays Stadium; Jonesboro, AR | W 35–0 | | |
| November 16 | | at Henderson State | Arkadelphia, AR | W 37–13 | | |
| November 24 | | at Southern Illinois | McAndrew Stadium; Carbondale, IL | W 68–0 | 1,000 | |
| December 2 | 2:00 p.m. | vs. Camp Breckinridge | Reitz Bowl; Evansville, IN (Refrigerator Bowl) | W 46–12 | 10,000 | |
| January 1 | 7:00 p.m. | vs. Stetson | Tangerine Bowl; Orlando, FL (Tangerine Bowl) | L 20–35 | 12,500 | |
^{†}Homecoming; All times are in Central time
