= 1951 Miami Hurricanes football team =

American college football season

1951 Miami Hurricanes football

Gator Bowl champion

Gator Bowl, W 14–0 vs. Clemson
- Conference: Independent
- Record: 8–3
- Head coach: Andy Gustafson (4th season)
- Home stadium: Burdine Stadium

1951 Southern college football independents records
	Conf.			Overall
Team	W	L	T	W		L		T
No. 13 Virginia		–		8	–	1	–	0
Maryland State		–		7	–	1	–	0
Arkansas State		–		10	–	2	–	0
Stetson		–		8	–	1	–	2
Florida State		–		6	–	2	–	0
Northeast Louisiana State		–		6	–	2	–	0
Miami (FL)		–		8	–	3	–	0
Tampa		–		7	–	3	–	1
Delaware		–		5	–	3	–	0
Memphis State		–		5	–	3	–	0
Sewanee		–		5	–	3	–	0
McNeese State		–		5	–	4	–	1
Louisville		–		5	–	4	–	0
Chattanooga		–		6	–	5	–	0
Navy		–		2	–	6	–	1
Delta State		–		1	–	8	–	0
Rankings from AP Poll

The 1951 Miami Hurricanes football team represented the University of Miami as an independent during the 1951 college football season. Led by fourth-year head coach Andy Gustafson, the Hurricanes played their home games at Burdine Stadium in Miami, Florida. Miami finished the season 8–3. The Hurricanes were invited to the Gator Bowl, where they beat Clemson, 14–0.

== Schedule ==
Date	Opponent	Rank	Site	Result	Attendance	Source
September 29	at Tulane		Tulane Stadium; New Orleans, LA	L 7–21		
October 5	Florida State		Burdine Stadium; Miami, FL (rivalry)	W 35–13	38,278	
October 12	Purdue		Burdine Stadium; Miami, FL	W 7–0	51,838	
October 19	Washington and Lee		Burdine Stadium; Miami, FL	W 32–12	39,402	
October 26	Ole Miss		Burdine Stadium; Miami, FL	W 20–7		
November 3	at No. 14 Kentucky	No. 19	McLean Stadium; Lexington, KY	L 0–32	28,000	
November 9	Chattanooga		Burdine Stadium; Miami, FL	W 34–7		
November 17	Florida		Burdine Stadium; Miami, FL (rivalry)	W 21–6	61,602	
November 30	Nebraska		Burdine Stadium; Miami, FL (rivalry)	W 19–7	32,283	
December 7	Pittsburgh		Burdine Stadium; Miami, FL	L 7–21	39,855	
January 1	vs. Clemson		Gator Bowl Stadium; Jacksonville, FL (Gator Bowl)	W 14–0	37,208	
Rankings from AP Poll released prior to the game
