= 1951 North Carolina A&T Aggies football team =

American college football season

1951 North Carolina A&T Aggies football

Black college national co-champion
- Conference: Central Intercollegiate Athletic Association
- Record: 7–1–1 (5–1 CIAA)
- Head coach: William M. Bell (6th season)
- Home stadium: World War Memorial Stadium

1951 Central Intercollegiate Athletic Association football standings
	Conf.					Overall
Team	W		L		T	W		L		T
No. 8 West Virginia State $	5	–	0	–	1	6	–	2	–	1
No. 1 North Carolina A&T	5	–	1	–	0	7	–	1	–	1
No. 6 North Carolina College	5	–	1	–	1	7	–	2	–	1
Virginia Union	5	–	4	–	0	5	–	5	–	0
No. 19 Lincoln (PA)	4	–	2	–	0	6	–	2	–	0
No. 16 Virginia State	5	–	3	–	0	5	–	3	–	0
No. 18 Hampton	4	–	4	–	0	5	–	4	–	0
Winston-Salem State	4	–	2	–	0	4	–	4	–	0
Howard	5	–	4	–	0	5	–	4	–	0
Morgan State	3	–	4	–	0	3	–	5	–	0
Bluefield State	3	–	3	–	0	3	–	6	–	0
Johnson C. Smith	3	–	4	–	0	3	–	5	–	0
Delaware State	2	–	4	–	0	2	–	7	–	0
St. Augustine's	2	–	5	–	0	3	–	6	–	0
Shaw	1	–	8	–	0	1	–	9	–	0
Saint Paul's (VA)	0	–	7	–	0	0	–	8	–	0
$ – Conference champion; Rankings from Associated Negro Press

The 1951 North Carolina A&T Aggies football team was an American football team that represented the North Carolina Agricultural and Technical State University as a member of the Central Intercollegiate Athletic Association (CIAA) during the 1951 college football season. In their sixth season under head coach William M. Bell, the Aggies compiled a 7–1–1 record (5–1 in conference play) and outscored opponents by a total of 189 to 58. The team was also selected by the "Pigskin Huddle" published by the Associated Negro Press as the black college national champion.

== Schedule ==
Date	Opponent	Site	Result	Source
September 15	Central State (OH)*	World War Memorial Stadium; Greensboro, NC	W 27–12	
September 21	at Allen*	Antisdel Bowl; Columbia, SC	W 35–0	
September 29	at Virginia Union	Hovey Field; Richmond, VA	W 14–0	
October 6	Hampton	World War Memorial Stadium; Greensboro, NC	W 20–7	
October 13	Shaw	World War Memorial Stadium; Greensboro, NC	W 33–7	
October 20	Florida A&M*	World War Memorial Stadium; Greensboro, NC	T 7–7	
October 27	at Morgan State	Hughes Stadium; Baltimore, MD	W 31–6	
November 10	vs. Virginia State	Griffith Stadium; Washington, DC (Capital Classic)	L 9–13	
November 22	North Carolina College	World War Memorial Stadium; Greensboro, NC (rivalry)	W 13–6	
*Non-conference game
