= 1951 Delaware Fightin' Blue Hens football team =

American college football season

1951 Delaware Fightin' Blue Hens football
- Conference: Independent
- Record: 5–3
- Head coach: David M. Nelson (1st season)
- Captain: John DeGasperis
- Home stadium: Wilmington Park

1951 Southern college football independents records
	Conf.			Overall
Team	W	L	T	W		L		T
No. 13 Virginia		–		8	–	1	–	0
Maryland State		–		7	–	1	–	0
Arkansas State		–		10	–	2	–	0
Stetson		–		8	–	1	–	2
Florida State		–		6	–	2	–	0
Northeast Louisiana State		–		6	–	2	–	0
Miami (FL)		–		8	–	3	–	0
Tampa		–		7	–	3	–	1
Delaware		–		5	–	3	–	0
Memphis State		–		5	–	3	–	0
Sewanee		–		5	–	3	–	0
McNeese State		–		5	–	4	–	1
Louisville		–		5	–	4	–	0
Chattanooga		–		6	–	5	–	0
Navy		–		2	–	6	–	1
Delta State		–		1	–	8	–	0
Rankings from AP Poll

The 1951 Delaware Fightin' Blue Hens football team was an American football team that represented the University of Delaware as an independent during the 1951 college football season. The team compiled a 5–3 record and outscored opponents by a total of 173 to 109. John DeGasperis was the team captain. The team played its home games at Wilmington Park in Wilmington, Delaware.

David M. Nelson was hired as the program's head football coach in February 1951. He head previously served as the head football coach and athletic director at the University of Maine. Nelson served as the head coach until 1965 and as athletic director until 1984.

== Schedule ==
Date	Opponent	Site	Result	Attendance	Source
September 22	Lehigh	Wilmington Park; Wilmington, DE (rivalry)	W 7–0	8,500	
September 29	at Connecticut	Gardner Dow Athletic Fields; Storrs, CT	L 14–27	7,500	
October 6	West Chester	Wilmington Park; Wilmington, DE (rivalry)	W 47–20	7,000	
October 13	Pennsylvania Military	Wilmington Park; Wilmington, DE	W 46–2	5,332	
October 20	Temple	Wilmington Park; Wilmington, DE	L 7–13	8,300	
October 27	Muhlenberg	Wilmington Park; Wilmington, DE	W 21–7	5,500	
November 10	at Lafayette	Fisher Field; Easton, PA	W 25–7	6,000	
November 17	at Bucknell	Memorial Stadium; Lewisburg, PA	L 6–33	7,000	
