= 1951 Florida State Seminoles football team =

American college football season

1951 Florida State Seminoles football
- Conference: Independent
- Record: 6–2
- Head coach: Don Veller (4th season)
- Captain: Bill Dawkins
- Home stadium: Doak Campbell Stadium

1951 Southern college football independents records
	Conf.			Overall
Team	W	L	T	W		L		T
No. 13 Virginia		–		8	–	1	–	0
Maryland State		–		7	–	1	–	0
Arkansas State		–		10	–	2	–	0
Stetson		–		8	–	1	–	2
Florida State		–		6	–	2	–	0
Northeast Louisiana State		–		6	–	2	–	0
Miami (FL)		–		8	–	3	–	0
Tampa		–		7	–	3	–	1
Delaware		–		5	–	3	–	0
Memphis State		–		5	–	3	–	0
Sewanee		–		5	–	3	–	0
McNeese State		–		5	–	4	–	1
Louisville		–		5	–	4	–	0
Chattanooga		–		6	–	5	–	0
Navy		–		2	–	6	–	1
Delta State		–		1	–	8	–	0
Rankings from AP Poll

The 1951 Florida State Seminoles football team represented Florida State University as an independent during the 1951 college football season. Led by fourth-year head coach Don Veller, the Seminoles compiled a record of 6–2. On October 5, Florida state played the Miami Hurricanes, losing 35–13. The game was the first meeting between the two schools and the beginning of the longstanding rivalry.

== Schedule ==
Date	Time	Opponent	Site	Result	Attendance	Source
September 29		Troy State	Doak Campbell Stadium; Tallahassee, FL	W 40–0	8,459	
October 5		at Miami (FL)	Burdine Stadium; Miami, FL (rivalry)	L 13–35	38,278	
October 13		Delta State	Doak Campbell Stadium; Tallahassee, FL	W 34–0		
October 20		Sul Ross	Doak Campbell Stadium; Tallahassee, FL	W 35–13	1,960	
October 27		Stetson^{†}	Doak Campbell Stadium; Tallahassee, FL	W 13–10	13,700	
November 3		at Jacksonville NAS	Gator Bowl Stadium; Jacksonville, FL	W 39–0	1,700	
November 10		Wofford	Doak Campbell Stadium; Tallahassee, FL	W 14–0	5,636	
November 17	8:00 p.m.	at Tampa	Phillips Field; Tampa, FL	L 6–14	12,000	
^{†}Homecoming; All times are in Eastern time
