= 1951 Virginia Cavaliers football team =

American college football season

1951 Virginia Cavaliers football
- Conference: Independent

Ranking
- AP: No. 13
- Record: 8–1
- Head coach: Art Guepe (6th season)
- Captain: Joe Palumbo
- Home stadium: Scott Stadium

1951 Southern college football independents records
| | Conf. | | | Overall |
| Team | W | L | T | W | | L | | T |
|---|---|---|---|---|---|---|---|---|
| No. 13 Virginia | | – | | 8 | – | 1 | – | 0 |
| Maryland State | | – | | 7 | – | 1 | – | 0 |
| Arkansas State | | – | | 10 | – | 2 | – | 0 |
| Stetson | | – | | 8 | – | 1 | – | 2 |
| Florida State | | – | | 6 | – | 2 | – | 0 |
| Northeast Louisiana State | | – | | 6 | – | 2 | – | 0 |
| Texas Southern | | – | | 7 | – | 3 | – | 1 |
| Miami (FL) | | – | | 8 | – | 3 | – | 0 |
| Tampa | | – | | 7 | – | 3 | – | 1 |
| Delaware | | – | | 5 | – | 3 | – | 0 |
| Memphis State | | – | | 5 | – | 3 | – | 0 |
| Sewanee | | – | | 5 | – | 3 | – | 0 |
| McNeese State | | – | | 5 | – | 4 | – | 1 |
| Louisville | | – | | 5 | – | 4 | – | 0 |
| Chattanooga | | – | | 6 | – | 5 | – | 0 |
| Grambling | | – | | 4 | – | 5 | – | 1 |
| Navy | | – | | 2 | – | 6 | – | 1 |
| Delta State | | – | | 1 | – | 8 | – | 0 |
Rankings from AP Poll

The 1951 Virginia Cavaliers football team represented the University of Virginia during the 1951 college football season. The Cavaliers were led by sixth-year head coach Art Guepe and played their home games at Scott Stadium in Charlottesville, Virginia. They finished with 8 wins for the second consecutive year, and were invited to play in the Orange Bowl, but University President Colgate Darden declined the invitation. Virginia was ranked 13th in the final AP Poll of the season, the first ranked finish in school history. It is to date the school's highest finish in a final poll.

== Schedule ==
| Date | Opponent | Rank | Site | Result | Attendance | Source |
|---|---|---|---|---|---|---|
| September 29 | George Washington | | Scott Stadium; Charlottesville, VA | W 20–0 | 20,000 | |
| October 6 | vs. VPI | | Victory Stadium; Roanoke, VA (rivalry) | W 33–0 | 12,500 | |
| October 13 | at Washington and Lee | | Wilson Field; Lexington, VA | L 14–42 | 10,000 | |
| October 20 | VMI^{†} | | Scott Stadium; Charlottesville, VA | W 34–14 | 24,000 | |
| October 27 | at Duke | | Duke Stadium; Durham, NC | W 30–7 | 25,000 | |
| November 3 | The Citadel | | Scott Stadium; Charlottesville, VA | W 39–0 | 10,000 | |
| November 10 | North Carolina | | Scott Stadium; Charlottesville, VA (rivalry) | W 34–14 | 25,000 | |
| November 17 | South Carolina | | Scott Stadium; Charlottesville, VA | W 28–27 | 10,000 | |
| November 24 | William & Mary | No. 15 | Scott Stadium; Charlottesville, VA | W 46–0 | 26,000 | |
^{†}Homecoming; Rankings from AP Poll released prior to the game
