= 1951 Delaware State Hornets football team =

American college football season

1951 Delaware State Hornets football
- Conference: Central Intercollegiate Athletic Association
- Record: 2–7 (2–4 CIAA)
- Head coach: Willard S. Jones (1st season)

1951 Central Intercollegiate Athletic Association football standings
	Conf.					Overall
Team	W		L		T	W		L		T
No. 8 West Virginia State $	5	–	0	–	1	6	–	2	–	1
No. 1 North Carolina A&T	5	–	1	–	0	7	–	1	–	1
No. 6 North Carolina College	5	–	1	–	1	7	–	2	–	1
Virginia Union	5	–	4	–	0	5	–	5	–	0
No. 19 Lincoln (PA)	4	–	2	–	0	6	–	2	–	0
No. 16 Virginia State	5	–	3	–	0	5	–	3	–	0
No. 18 Hampton	4	–	4	–	0	5	–	4	–	0
Winston-Salem State	4	–	2	–	0	4	–	4	–	0
Howard	5	–	4	–	0	5	–	4	–	0
Morgan State	3	–	4	–	0	3	–	5	–	0
Bluefield State	3	–	3	–	0	3	–	6	–	0
Johnson C. Smith	3	–	4	–	0	3	–	5	–	0
Delaware State	2	–	4	–	0	2	–	7	–	0
St. Augustine's	2	–	5	–	0	3	–	6	–	0
Shaw	1	–	8	–	0	1	–	9	–	0
Saint Paul's (VA)	0	–	7	–	0	0	–	8	–	0
$ – Conference champion; Rankings from Associated Negro Press

The 1951 Delaware State Hornets football team represented Delaware State College—now known as Delaware State University—as a member of the Central Intercollegiate Athletic Association (CIAA) in the 1951 college football season. Led by coach Willard S. Jones in his first year, the Hornets compiled a 2–7 record, being shut out four times and outscored 41 to 158.

== Schedule ==
Date	Time	Opponent	Site	Result	Attendance	Source
September 15	8:30 p.m.	at King's (PA)*	Wilkes-Barre Memorial Stadium; Wilkes-Barre, PA	L 0–13		
September 29		at Morgan State	Hughes Stadium; Baltimore, MD	L 6–45	2,500	
October 6		Cheyney*	Dover, DE	L 0–3		
October 13		at Johnson C. Smith	Charlotte, NC	L 0–24		
October 20		Lincoln (PA)	Dover, DE	L 0–34		
October 27		at Saint Paul's (VA)	Lawrenceville, VA	W 14–0		
November 3		Maryland State*	Dover, DE	L 6–18		
November 10		at Howard	Washington, DC	L 2–21		
November 17		St. Augustine's	Dover, DE	W 13–0		
*Non-conference game
