= 1951 Memphis State Tigers football team =

American college football season

1951 Memphis State Tigers football
- Conference: Independent
- Record: 5–3
- Head coach: Ralph Hatley (5th season)
- Home stadium: Crump Stadium

1951 Southern college football independents records
	Conf.			Overall
Team	W	L	T	W		L		T
No. 13 Virginia		–		8	–	1	–	0
Maryland State		–		7	–	1	–	0
Arkansas State		–		10	–	2	–	0
Stetson		–		8	–	1	–	2
Florida State		–		6	–	2	–	0
Northeast Louisiana State		–		6	–	2	–	0
Texas Southern		–		7	–	3	–	1
Miami (FL)		–		8	–	3	–	0
Tampa		–		7	–	3	–	1
Delaware		–		5	–	3	–	0
Memphis State		–		5	–	3	–	0
Sewanee		–		5	–	3	–	0
McNeese State		–		5	–	4	–	1
Louisville		–		5	–	4	–	0
Chattanooga		–		6	–	5	–	0
Grambling		–		4	–	5	–	1
Navy		–		2	–	6	–	1
Delta State		–		1	–	8	–	0
Rankings from AP Poll

The 1951 Memphis State Tigers football team was an American football team that represented Memphis State College (now known as the University of Memphis) as an independent during the 1951 college football season. In their fifth season under head coach Ralph Hatley, Memphis State compiled a 5–3 record.

The Tigers were ranked at No. 82 in the 1951 Litkenhous Ratings.

== Schedule ==
Date	Opponent	Site	Result	Attendance	Source
September 21	Ole Miss	Crump Stadium; Memphis, TN (rivalry)	L 0–32		
October 6	Louisiana Tech	Crump Stadium; Memphis, TN	W 26–14	4,248	
October 20	at Southwestern Louisiana	McNaspy Stadium; Lafayette, LA	W 41–7		
October 27	Western Kentucky	Crump Stadium; Memphis, TN	W 38–0		
November 3	East Central	Crump Stadium; Memphis, TN	W 61–0		
November 10	Mississippi State	Crump Stadium; Memphis, TN	L 20–27		
November 17	Chattanooga	Crump Stadium; Memphis, TN	W 13–0	3,164	
November 24	at Vanderbilt	Dudley Field; Nashville, TN	L 7–13	4,000	
