= 1951 Navy Midshipmen football team =

American college football season

1951 Navy Midshipmen football
- Conference: Independent
- Record: 2–6–1
- Head coach: Eddie Erdelatz (2nd season)
- Captain: Frank Hauff
- Home stadium: Thompson Stadium

1951 Southern college football independents records
	Conf.			Overall
Team	W	L	T	W		L		T
No. 13 Virginia		–		8	–	1	–	0
Maryland State		–		7	–	1	–	0
Arkansas State		–		10	–	2	–	0
Stetson		–		8	–	1	–	2
Florida State		–		6	–	2	–	0
Northeast Louisiana State		–		6	–	2	–	0
Texas Southern		–		7	–	3	–	1
Miami (FL)		–		8	–	3	–	0
Tampa		–		7	–	3	–	1
Delaware		–		5	–	3	–	0
Memphis State		–		5	–	3	–	0
Sewanee		–		5	–	3	–	0
McNeese State		–		5	–	4	–	1
Louisville		–		5	–	4	–	0
Chattanooga		–		6	–	5	–	0
Grambling		–		4	–	5	–	1
Navy		–		2	–	6	–	1
Delta State		–		1	–	8	–	0
Rankings from AP Poll

The 1951 Navy Midshipmen football team represented the United States Naval Academy (USNA) as an independent during the 1951 college football season. The team was led by second-year head coach Eddie Erdelatz.

== Schedule ==
Date	Opponent	Site	Result	Attendance	Source
September 29	at Yale	Yale Bowl; New Haven, CT	T 7–7	55,000	
October 6	Princeton^{†}	Thompson Stadium; Annapolis, MD	L 20–24	21,000	
October 13	at Rice	Rice Stadium; Houston, TX	L 14–21	58,000	
October 20	at No. 18 Northwestern	Dyche Stadium; Evanston, IL	L 7–16	40,000	
October 27	at Penn	Franklin Field; Philadelphia, PA	L 0–14	61,000	
November 3	vs. No. 13 Notre Dame	Municipal Stadium; Baltimore, MD (rivalry)	L 0–19	44,237	
November 10	vs. Maryland	Municipal Stadium; Baltimore, MD (rivalry)	L 21–40	38,000	
November 17	at Columbia	Baker Field; New York, NY	W 21–7	25,300	
December 1	vs. Army	Philadelphia Municipal Stadium; Philadelphia, PA (Army–Navy Game)	W 42–7		
^{†}Homecoming; Rankings from AP Poll released prior to the game
