= 1951 East Carolina Pirates football team =

American college football season

1951 East Carolina Pirates football
- Conference: North State Conference
- Record: 4–6 (1–4 NSC)
- Head coach: Bill Dole (3rd season)
- Home stadium: College Stadium

1951 North State Conference football standings
	Conf.					Overall
Team	W		L		T	W		L		T
Lenoir Rhyne $	6	–	0	–	0	10	–	1	–	0
Elon	4	–	2	–	0	6	–	3	–	0
Catawba	3	–	2	–	0	5	–	5	–	0
Appalachian State	3	–	3	–	0	6	–	3	–	0
East Carolina	1	–	4	–	0	4	–	6	–	0
Western Carolina	1	–	4	–	0	3	–	6	–	0
Guilford	1	–	4	–	0	1	–	7	–	0
$ – Conference champion

The 1951 East Carolina Pirates football team was an American football team that represented East Carolina College (now known as East Carolina University) as a member of the North State Conference during the 1951 college football season. In their third season under head coach Bill Dole, the team compiled a 4–6 record and as conference champions.

== Schedule ==
Date	Time	Opponent	Site	Result	Attendance	Source
September 15		at Mississippi Southern*	Faulkner Field; Hattiesburg, MS	L 0–40		
September 21		at The Apprentice School*	Apprentice Field; Newport News, VA	W 32–6		
September 29		at Norfolk NAS*	Norfolk, VA	W 7–6		
October 6		Elon	College Stadium; Greenville, NC	L 20–34		
October 13		at Western Carolina	Memorial Stadium; Cullowhee, NC	L 20–34		
October 20		Guilford	College Stadium; Greenville, NC	W 19–14		
October 27	8:00 p.m.	Lenoir Rhyne	College Stadium; Greenville, NC	L 14–41	3,000	
November 3		Appalachian State	College Stadium; Greenville, NC	L 20–24		
November 10		at Cherry Point Marines*	Havelock, NC	W 45–0		
November 24		at The Citadel*	Johnson Hagood Stadium; Charleston, SC	L 7–21	3,500	
*Non-conference game; All times are in Eastern time
