= 1951 Lenoir Rhyne Bears football team =

American college football season

1951 Lenoir Rhyne Bears football

NSC champion

Pythian Bowl, W 13–7 vs. California (PA)
- Conference: North State Conference
- Record: 10–1 (6–0 NSC)
- Head coach: Clarence Stasavich (6th season)
- Home stadium: Lenoir Rhyne College Field

1951 North State Conference football standings
	Conf.					Overall
Team	W		L		T	W		L		T
Lenoir Rhyne $	6	–	0	–	0	10	–	1	–	0
Elon	4	–	2	–	0	6	–	3	–	0
Catawba	3	–	2	–	0	5	–	5	–	0
Appalachian State	3	–	3	–	0	6	–	3	–	0
East Carolina	1	–	4	–	0	4	–	6	–	0
Western Carolina	1	–	4	–	0	3	–	6	–	0
Guilford	1	–	4	–	0	1	–	7	–	0
$ – Conference champion

The 1951 Lenoir Rhyne Bears football team represented Lenoir Rhyne College—now known as Lenoir–Rhyne University—as a member of the North State Conference (NSC) during the 1951 college football season. Led by sixth-year head coach Clarence Stasavich, the Bears compiled an overall record of 10–1 with a mark of 6–0 in conference play, winning the NSC title. Lenoir Rhyne was invited to the Pythian Bowl, where Bears defeated the California Vulcans.

== Schedule ==
Date	Time	Opponent	Site	Result	Attendance	Source
September 15	8:00 p.m.	at Erskine*	Fairgrounds Stadium; Greenwood, SC	W 28–0	1,000	
September 22	8:00 p.m.	at Davidson*	Richardson Stadium; Davidson, NC	W 21–7	5,000	
September 29	8:00 p.m.	Newberry*	Lenoir Rhyne College Field; Hickory, NC	W 7–6	3,500	
October 6	7:00 p.m.	at Appalachian State	College Field; Boone, NC	W 20–0	6,500	
October 13	8:00 p.m.	at Tampa*	Phillips Field; Tampa, FL	L 14–27	8,500	
October 20	8:00 p.m.	at Western Carolina	Memorial Stadium; Cullowhee, NC	W 33–7	2,000	
October 27	8:00 p.m.	at East Carolina	College Stadium; Greenville, NC	W 41–14	3,000	
November 3	8:00 p.m.	Guilford^{†}	Lenoir Rhyne College Field; Hickory, NC	W 33–0	5,000	
November 10	8:00 p.m.	Elon	Lenoir Rhyne College Field; Hickory, NC	W 48–14	8,200	
November 22	2:00 p.m.	Catawba	Lenoir Rhyne College Field; Hickory, NC	W 33–13	10,000	
December 8	2:00 p.m.	vs. California (PA)*	Shuford Stadium; Salisbury, NC (Pythian Bowl)	W 13–7	4,500	
*Non-conference game; ^{†}Homecoming; All times are in Eastern time
