= Earl Looman =

American football coach (1932–1992)

No. 79
- Positions: Guard, defensive end

Personal information
- Born: July 21, 1932
- Died: January 3, 1992 (aged 59); Marion County, Florida, U.S.
- Listed height: 6 ft 2 in (1.88 m)
- Listed weight: 235 lb (107 kg)

Career information
- High school: Fremont Ross (Fremont, Ohio)
- College: Toledo (1950); Stetson (1951–1952, 1955)
- NFL draft: 1956: 18th round, 211th overall pick

Career history

Playing
- Baltimore Colts (1956)*; Daytona Beach / Orlando Thunderbirds (1962–1965)
- * Offseason or practice squad member only

Coaching
- Stetson (1956) Line coach; Florida Military School (FL) (1957) Head coach; Daytona Beach Thunderbirds (1962–1964) Defensive line coach; Orlando Thunderbirds (1965) Co-interim head coach & line coach; Father Lopez HS (FL) (c. 1970s) Assistant coach; New Smyrna Beach HS (FL) (1972–1981) Defensive line coach; New Smyrna Beach HS (FL) (c. 1980s–1991) Defensive coordinator

Awards and highlights
- Stetson Hall of Fame (1981); NAIA All-American (1955)

Earl Looman Jr. (July 21, 1932 – January 3, 1992) was an American football player and coach.

== Early life and football career ==
Looman grew up in Toledo, Ohio, and attended Fremont Ross High School. He then played college football for Stetson. He was used as a right tackle, defensive end, and linebacker throughout his career. He played with the team from 1951 to 1952 before enrolling in the military. He returned in 1955 as a senior and earned National Association of Intercollegiate Athletics (NAIA) All-American honors along with being named team MVP.

Looman was drafted in the 18th round of the 1956 NFL draft to the Baltimore Colts as an offensive guard. He signed with the team on February 27, 1956. He suffered a back sprain within the first five minutes of the initial summer workouts. He was then cut due to the injury not healing.

In 1956, after being released by the Colts, Looman returned to his alma mater, Stetson, as the team's line coach. He had initially declined the position to sign with the Colts. Stetson dropped football after the season and Looman was hired as the head football coach for Florida Military School. As head coach, his team ran a Split-T offense.

In 1962, Looman returned to the gridiron as a player-coach for the Daytona Beach Thunderbirds of the Florida Professional Football League (FPFL). He also served as the team's defensive line coach. The team became members of the Southern Football League (SFL) in 1964. In 1965, the team moved to Orlando and became the Orlando Thunderbirds. He served as a co-interim head coach for the season after Bud Asher announced his resignation due to a financial dispute.

In 1970, Looman served as an assistant coach for Father Lopez Catholic High School. In 1972, he reunited with Asher as his defensive line coach for New Smyrna Beach High School.

== Personal life ==
On November 9, 1956, Looman married Betsy Duck in DeLand, Florida. In June 1957, the pair received their bachelor's degrees in science and music, respectively.

Looman died on January 2, 1992.

== See also ==
- List of Stetson Hatters in the NFL draft
