= Central Church College Conference =

Intercollegiate athletic football conference

The Central Church College Conference (CCCC) was an intercollegiate athletic conference that existed from 1951 and 1957. Its membership was centered on the states of Missouri and Nebraska.

== Football champions ==
- 1951: Concordia (NE)
- 1952: Concordia (NE)
- 1953: Dana
- 1954: Concordia (NE)
- 1955: Concordia (NE)
- 1956: Tarkio
- 1957: Dana

== Yearly football standings ==
1951 Central Church College Conference football standings
	Conf.					Overall
Team	W		L		T	W		L		T
Concordia (NE) $	3	–	0	–	0	8	–	1	–	0
York (NE)	2	–	1	–	0	5	–	3	–	0
Tarkio	1	–	2	–	0	1	–	7	–	0
Dana	0	–	3	–	0	2	–	6	–	0
$ – Conference champion

1952 Central Church College Conference football standings
	Conf.					Overall
Team	W		L		T	W		L		T
Concordia (NE) $	3	–	0	–	0	6	–	3	–	0
Dana	2	–	1	–	0	3	–	4	–	0
Tarkio	1	–	2	–	0	1	–	7	–	0
York (NE)	0	–	3	–	0	2	–	6	–	0
$ – Conference champion

1953 Central Church College Conference football standings
	Conf.					Overall
Team	W		L		T	W		L		T
Dana $	3	–	1	–	0	4	–	3	–	1
Concordia (NE)	2	–	1	–	1	7	–	1	–	1
Tarkio	0	–	3	–	1	2	–	5	–	1
$ – Conference champion

1954 Central Church College Conference football standings
	Conf.					Overall
Team	W		L		T	W		L		T
Concordia (NE) $	3	–	0	–	0	7	–	1	–	1
Tarkio	2	–	1	–	0	4	–	3	–	1
Westmar	1	–	2	–	0	3	–	5	–	0
Dana	0	–	3	–	0	1	–	5	–	1
$ – Conference champion

1955 Central Church College Conference football standings
	Conf.					Overall
Team	W		L		T	W		L		T
Concordia (NE) $	3	–	0	–	0	6	–	2	–	0
Tarkio	2	–	1	–	0	5	–	3	–	0
Westmar	1	–	2	–	0	1	–	7	–	0
Dana	0	–	3	–	0	1	–	6	–	0
$ – Conference champion

1956 Central Church College Conference football standings
	Conf.					Overall
Team	W		L		T	W		L		T
Tarkio $	3	–	0	–	0	7	–	1	–	0
Westmar	2	–	1	–	0	2	–	4	–	2
Concordia (NE)	1	–	2	–	0	2	–	6	–	0
Dana	0	–	3	–	0	0	–	6	–	0
$ – Conference champion

1957 Central Church College Conference football standings
	Conf.					Overall
Team	W		L		T	W		L		T
Dana $	3	–	0	–	0	3	–	5	–	0
Westmar	2	–	1	–	0	6	–	2	–	1
Tarkio	1	–	2	–	0	2	–	5	–	0
Concordia (NE)	0	–	3	–	0	1	–	6	–	0
$ – Conference champion

== See also ==
- List of defunct college football conferences
