= Dewey McConnell =

American football player (1930–1984)

No. 26
- Positions: Defensive back, defensive end

Personal information
- Born: January 26, 1930; Laramie, Wyoming, U.S.
- Died: February 19, 1984 (aged 54); Laramie, Wyoming, U.S.
- Listed height: 6 ft 0 in (1.83 m)
- Listed weight: 190 lb (86 kg)

Career information
- High school: Laramie
- College: Wyoming (1948–1951)
- NFL draft: 1952: 3rd round, 37th overall pick

Career history
- Pittsburgh Steelers (1954)

Awards and highlights
- First-team All-American (1951)

Career NFL statistics
- Interceptions: 3
- Fumble recoveries: 1
- Stats at Pro Football Reference

Dewey L. McConnell (January 26, 1930 – February 19, 1984) was an American professional football player. A native of Laramie, Wyoming, McConnell played college football for the Wyoming Cowboys football team. After leading the NCAA with 47 receptions for 725 yards during the 1951 season, McConnell was selected by the Associated Press and the Newspaper Enterprise Association as a first-team player on their 1951 College Football All-America Teams. He was drafted by the Los Angeles Rams with the 37th pick in the 1952 NFL draft. Dewey then served in the US Navy in San Diego from mid 1952 to mid 1954. After leaving the Navy Dewey was traded to Pittsburgh where he played during the 1954 season. McConnell was inducted into the Wyoming Athletics Hall of Fame in 1995.

== See also ==
- List of NCAA major college football yearly receiving leaders
