= 1951 college football season =

American college football season

- First AP No. 1 of season: Tennessee
- Number of bowls: 8
- Champion(s): Tennessee (AP, Coaches)
- Heisman: Dick Kazmaier (halfback, Princeton)

The 1951 college football season was the 83rd season of intercollegiate football in the United States. It finished with Princeton halfback Dick Kazmaier winning the Heisman Trophy and the Maxwell Award. Five teams have laid claim to the 1951 national championship:

- Tennessee was unbeaten and untied in the regular season and was ranked No. 1 in the final Associated Press (AP) and United Press (UP) coaches polls. The Volunteers then lost to No. 3 Maryland in the Sugar Bowl. The final polls were issued prior to the bowl games, leaving intact Tennessee's claim as AP and UP national champion. Tennessee's Hank Lauricella rushed for 881 yards and finished second in voting for the Heisman Trophy.
- Maryland compiled a perfect 10–0 record, including a 28–13 victory over Tennessee in the Sugar Bowl. The Terrapins were ranked No. 3 in the final AP poll but were recognized as national champion by Billingsley Report, College Football Researchers Association, National Championship Foundation, DeVold System, Dunkel System, and Sagarin Ratings. Maryland guard Bob Ward was a consensus All-American.
- Michigan State compiled a perfect 9–0 record, including victories over No. 7 Ohio State and No. 11 Notre Dame. The Spartans were ranked No. 2 in the final AP and UP polls, trailing Tennessee in the final AP poll by 139 first-place votes to 104. The Spartans were selected as national champion by the Billingsley Report, Helms Athletic Foundation, and Poling System. Michigan State tackle Don Coleman and end Bob Carey were consensus All-Americans.
- Georgia Tech compiled an 11–0–1 record, including a victory over No. 9 Baylor in the Orange Bowl. The Yellow Jackets were ranked No. 5 in the final AP and UP polls and were selected as national champion by Berryman (QPRS), Boand System, and Houlgate System.
- Illinois compiled a 9–0–1 record, won the Big Ten Conference championship, and defeated No. 7 Stanford in the Rose Bowl. The Illini were ranked No. 3 in the final UP poll and were selected as co-national champion by Boand System. Illinois halfback Johnny Karras was a consensus All-American.

Individual statistical leaders for the 1951 season included San Francisco halfback Ollie Matson with 1,566 rushing yards and 126 points scored, Princeton halfback Dick Kazmaier with 1,827 yards of total offense, Loyola quarterback Don Klosterman with 1,843 passing yards, and Wyoming end Dewey McConnell with 47 receptions.

== Conference and program changes ==
=== Conference changes ===
- Three conferences began play during the 1951 season:
  - Central Church College Conference – active through the 1957 season
  - Indiana Collegiate Conference - active through the 1977 season
  - Pennsylvania State Athletic Conference – an active NAIA/NCAA Division II conference

=== Membership changes ===
School	1950 Conference	1951 Conference
CCNY Beavers	Independent	Dropped Program
Duquesne Dukes	Independent	Dropped Program
Georgetown Hoyas	Independent	Dropped Program
High Point Panthers	Independent	Dropped Program
Houston Cougars	Gulf Coast	Missouri Valley
Kent State Golden Flashes	Independent	MAC
Milligan Buffaloes	Smoky Mountain Conference/Volunteer State Athletic Conference	Dropped Program
Montana Grizzlies	Independent	Skyline (Mountain States)
New Mexico Lobos	Border	Skyline (Mountain States)
Niagara Purple Eagles	Western New York Little Three	Dropped Program
St. Mary's Gaels	Independent	Dropped Program

== September ==
In the preseason poll released on September 24, 1951, Tennessee and Michigan State were ranked first and second, with Tennessee having 60 of the 115 first place votes. MSU had opened its season on the 22nd with a 6–0 win over Oregon State. They were followed by No. 3 Ohio State, defending champion No. 4 Oklahoma, and No. 5 California (which had won its opener against Santa Clara, 34–0). As the regular season progressed, a new poll would be issued on the Monday following the weekend's games.

On September 14, the Central Missouri Mules played the Southwestern Moundbuilders in the rejected touchdown game where Southwestern's head coach Harold Hunt "rejected" a touchdown awarded by officials because his player stepped out of bounds.

On September 29 No. 1 Tennessee beat Mississippi State 14–0. No. 2 Michigan State won at No. 17 Michigan, 25–0, to take the top spot from the Vols. No. 3 Ohio State beat visiting SMU 7–0 in a win not deemed good enough to stay in the top five. No. 4 Oklahoma beat William & Mary 49–7. No. 5 California won in Philadelphia against No. 19 Penn, 35–0, and rose to second in the next poll. The game was broadcast in New York in a test for color television No. 14 Notre Dame, which had beaten Indiana 48–6, rose to fifth. The poll: No. 1 Michigan State, No. 2 California, No. 3 Tennessee, No. 4 Oklahoma, and No. 5 Notre Dame.

== October ==
October 6 No. 1 Michigan State won at No. 7 Ohio State, 24–20. No. 2 California beat Minnesota, 55–14. No. 3 Tennessee beat No. 16 Duke 26–0. No. 4 Oklahoma lost at No. 10 Texas A&M, 14–7 and fell out of the top five. No. 5 Notre Dame had beaten Mercy College of Detroit, 40–6, the night before. The next poll: No. 1 Michigan State, No. 2 California, No. 3 Tennessee, No. 4 Texas A&M, and No. 5 Notre Dame.

October 13 No. 1 Michigan State had trouble in defeating Marquette 20–14. No. 2 California beat Washington State 42–35 and took over the top spot from the Spartans in the next poll. No. 3 Tennessee beat the University of Chattanooga 42–13. No. 4 Texas A&M beat Trinity College 53–14 and fell from the top five. No. 5 Notre Dame lost to visiting SMU, 27–20. Taking the places of the Aggies and the Irish were No. 6 Texas (which had beaten No. 11 Oklahoma in Dallas, 9–7) and No. 8 Georgia Tech (which had beaten LSU 25–7). The next poll: No. 1 California, No. 2 Tennessee, No. 3 Michigan State, No. 4 Texas, and No. 5 Georgia Tech.

October 20 In Los Angeles, No. 1 California and No. 11 USC, both unbeaten at 4–0–0, faced off, and the Golden Bears lost the game, along with the top spot in the poll, 21–14. Earlier, in Birmingham, No. 2 Tennessee defeated Alabama 27–13. No. 3 Michigan State won at Penn State, 32–21. No. 4 Texas lost at Arkansas, 16–14. No. 5 Georgia Tech defeated Auburn 27–7. Appearing in the top five were No. 8 Illinois (which had a 27–20 win over No. 20 Washington) and No. 7 Maryland (which had beaten North Carolina 14–7). The next poll: No. 1 Tennessee, No. 2 Michigan State, No. 3 Georgia Tech, No. 4 Illinois, and No. 5 Maryland.

Another significant game on this date, though for a far different reason, was the Drake–Oklahoma A&M matchup. Then-unbeaten Drake was led by quarterback Johnny Bright, who was leading the nation in total offense at the time and had been touted as a Heisman Trophy candidate. Two years earlier, he had been the first black player to appear in a game at A&M's home field, without incident. The same could not be said about this game. Bright was forced to leave the game in the first quarter after suffering three concussions and a broken jaw as the result of a racially motivated attack by white A&M player Wilbanks Smith, and A&M ultimately won 27–14. The attack was immortalized in a photo sequence in the Des Moines Register that won the photographers a Pulitzer Prize. It also had an enduring legacy on the sport:

- By the end of the school year, Drake and Bradley withdrew from the Missouri Valley Conference in protest over both the attack and the failure of either the conference or Oklahoma A&M to discipline Smith. Bradley would return to the MVC for non-football sports in 1955, with Drake doing the same a year later, but Bradley never returned for football (dropping the sport in 1970) and Drake did not return to MVC football until 1971.
- The attack led to new NCAA rules regarding illegal blocking and mandating the use of helmets with face guards.

October 27 No. 1 Tennessee beat Tennessee Tech 68–0. No. 2 Michigan State beat visiting Pitt, 53–26. No. 3 Georgia Tech won narrowly at Vanderbilt, 8–7. No. 4 Illinois won at Indiana, 21–0. Unbeaten (4–0–0) and No. 5 Maryland visited once-beaten (4–1–0) LSU, and won convincingly, 27–0. With the top five teams staying unbeaten, the poll changed only slightly: No. 1 Tennessee, No. 2 Michigan State, No. 3 Illinois, No 4 Maryland, and No. 5 Georgia Tech.

== November ==
November 3 No. 1 Tennessee won at North Carolina, 27–0 for its fourth shutout. In six games, the Vols had outscored their opponents, 207–14. No. 2 Michigan State was idle and dropped to fifth in the next poll. No. 3 Illinois beat No. 15 Michigan 7–0. No. 4 Maryland shut out Missouri 35–0. No. 5 Georgia Tech was tied by Duke, 14–14. No. 6 Princeton, which rose to 5–0–0 after a 12–0 win over Brown and had not lost a game in more than two years, gave an Ivy League addition to the Top Five. The next poll: No. 1 Tennessee, No. 2 Illinois, No. 3 Maryland, No. 4 Princeton, and No. 5 Michigan State.

November 10 No. 1 Tennessee beat Washington & Lee, 60–14. No. 2 Illinois beat Iowa 40–13. In Baltimore, No. 3 Maryland beat Navy, 40–21. No. 4 Princeton won at Harvard, 54–13 but left the top five. No. 5 Michigan State (6–0–0) hosted No. 11 Notre Dame (5–1–0), shut out the Irish 35–0, and returned to the No. 1 spot in the poll. In Los Angeles, two unbeaten and untied (7–0–0) powers faced off, as No. 6 USC and No. 7 Stanford met. The Stanford Indians beat the Trojans 27–20. The next poll: No. 1 Michigan State, No. 2 Tennessee, No. 3 Illinois, No. 4 Stanford, and No. 5 Maryland.

November 17 No. 1 Michigan State won at Indiana, 30–26. No. 2 Tennessee won at Mississippi, 46–21. No. 3 Illinois got a blemish on its record with a 0–0 tie at Ohio State. No. 4 Stanford beat Oregon State 35–14. No. 5 Maryland overwhelmed N.C. State 53–0. No. 6 Princeton, which had shut out Yale 27–0, came back to the top five. The next poll: No. 1 Tennessee, No. 2 Michigan State, No. 3 Stanford, No. 4 Maryland, and No. 5 Princeton.

November 24 No. 1 Tennessee beat No. 9 Kentucky 28–0. No. 2 Michigan State beat Colorado 45–7 to finish its season at 9–0–0. No. 3 Stanford suffered its first defeat, falling to No. 19 California 20–7. No. 4 Maryland stayed unbeaten, defeating West Virginia 54–7. No. 5 Princeton closed its season with a 13–0 win over Dartmouth. No. 6 Illinois, which won at Northwestern 3–0, returned to the top five. The penultimate poll: No. 1 Tennessee, No. 2 Michigan State, No. 3 Maryland, No. 4 Illinois, and No. 5 Princeton.

On December 1 No. 1 Tennessee closed its season unbeaten with a 35–27 win over Vanderbilt. No. 6 Georgia Tech, the only other highly-ranked team which had not finished its season, defeated Georgia 48–6. This result moved the Yellow Jackets up a spot in the final poll: No. 1 Tennessee, No. 2 Michigan State, No. 3 Maryland, No. 4 Illinois, No. 5 Georgia Tech, and No. 6 Princeton, with all six teams being undefeated (although Illinois and Georgia Tech both had ties on their record).

The nation's seventh undefeated team was the No. 14 University of San Francisco Dons, who closed their season—and their football program—with a perfect record of 9 wins, 0 losses and 0 ties. After their November 24 game against in-state Jesuit rival Loyola University, a 20–2 win, USF stopped playing football.

== Conference standings ==
=== Major conference standings ===
1951 Big Seven Conference football standings
	Conf.					Overall
Team	W		L		T	W		L		T
No. 10 Oklahoma $	6	–	0	–	0	8	–	2	–	0
Colorado	5	–	1	–	0	7	–	3	–	0
Kansas	4	–	2	–	0	8	–	2	–	0
Iowa State	2	–	4	–	0	4	–	4	–	1
Nebraska	2	–	4	–	0	2	–	8	–	0
Missouri	2	–	4	–	0	3	–	7	–	0
Kansas State	0	–	6	–	0	0	–	9	–	0
$ – Conference champion; Rankings from AP Poll

1951 Big Ten Conference football standings
	Conf.					Overall
Team	W		L		T	W		L		T
No. 4 Illinois $	5	–	0	–	1	9	–	0	–	1
Purdue	4	–	1	–	0	5	–	4	–	0
No. 8 Wisconsin	5	–	1	–	1	7	–	1	–	1
Michigan	4	–	2	–	0	4	–	5	–	0
Ohio State	2	–	2	–	2	4	–	3	–	2
Northwestern	2	–	4	–	0	5	–	4	–	0
Minnesota	1	–	4	–	1	2	–	6	–	1
Indiana	1	–	5	–	0	2	–	7	–	0
Iowa	0	–	5	–	1	2	–	5	–	2
$ – Conference champion; Rankings from AP Poll

1951 Border Conference football standings
	Conf.					Overall
Team	W		L		T	W		L		T
Texas Tech $	4	–	0	–	0	7	–	4	–	0
Arizona State	4	–	1	–	0	6	–	3	–	1
Hardin–Simmons	4	–	1	–	0	6	–	6	–	0
Arizona	3	–	3	–	0	6	–	5	–	0
Texas Western	2	–	4	–	0	3	–	7	–	0
New Mexico A&M	1	–	4	–	0	1	–	9	–	0
West Texas State	1	–	5	–	0	2	–	7	–	0
Arizona State–Flagstaff	0	–	1	–	0	1	–	7	–	0
$ – Conference champion

1951 Mid-American Conference football standings
	Conf.					Overall
Team	W		L		T	W		L		T
Cincinnati $	3	–	0	–	0	10	–	1	–	0
Miami (OH)	3	–	1	–	0	7	–	3	–	0
Kent State	2	–	1	–	0	4	–	3	–	2
Ohio	2	–	2	–	0	5	–	4	–	1
Western Reserve	1	–	3	–	0	2	–	6	–	1
Western Michigan	0	–	4	–	0	4	–	4	–	0
$ – Conference champion

1951 Middle Three Conference football standings
	Conf.					Overall
Team	W		L		T	W		L		T
Lehigh $	2	–	0	–	0	7	–	2	–	0
Rutgers	1	–	1	–	0	4	–	4	–	0
Lafayette	0	–	2	–	0	1	–	7	–	0
$ – Conference champion

1951 Pacific Coast Conference football standings
	Conf.					Overall
Team	W		L		T	W		L		T
No. 7 Stanford $	6	–	1	–	0	9	–	2	–	0
No. 17 UCLA	4	–	1	–	1	5	–	3	–	1
No. 12 California	5	–	2	–	0	8	–	2	–	0
USC	4	–	2	–	0	7	–	3	–	0
No. 18 Washington State	4	–	3	–	0	7	–	3	–	0
Oregon State	3	–	5	–	0	4	–	6	–	0
Washington	1	–	5	–	1	3	–	6	–	1
Oregon	1	–	6	–	0	2	–	8	–	0
Idaho	0	–	3	–	0	2	–	7	–	0
$ – Conference champion; Rankings from AP Poll

1951 Skyline Conference football standings
	Conf.					Overall
Team	W		L		T	W		L		T
Utah $	4	–	1	–	0	7	–	4	–	0
Wyoming	5	–	1	–	1	7	–	2	–	1
Denver	4	–	3	–	0	6	–	4	–	0
Colorado A&M	3	–	3	–	1	5	–	4	–	1
BYU	2	–	3	–	1	6	–	3	–	1
Utah State	2	–	4	–	1	3	–	5	–	1
New Mexico	2	–	4	–	0	4	–	7	–	0
Montana	1	–	4	–	0	2	–	7	–	0
$ – Conference champion

1951 Southeastern Conference football standings
	Conf.					Overall
Team	W		L		T	W		L		T
No. 5 Georgia Tech +	7	–	0	–	0	11	–	0	–	1
No. 1 Tennessee +	5	–	0	–	0	10	–	1	–	0
LSU	4	–	2	–	1	7	–	3	–	1
Ole Miss	4	–	2	–	1	6	–	3	–	1
No. 15 Kentucky	3	–	3	–	0	8	–	4	–	0
Auburn	3	–	4	–	0	5	–	5	–	0
Vanderbilt	3	–	5	–	0	6	–	5	–	0
Alabama	3	–	5	–	0	5	–	6	–	0
Florida	2	–	4	–	0	5	–	5	–	0
Georgia	2	–	4	–	0	5	–	5	–	0
Mississippi State	2	–	5	–	0	4	–	5	–	0
Tulane	1	–	5	–	0	4	–	6	–	0
+ – Conference co-champions; Rankings from AP Poll

1951 Southern Conference football standings
	Conf.					Overall
Team	W		L		T	W		L		T
No. 3 Maryland +	5	–	0	–	0	10	–	0	–	0
VMI +	5	–	0	–	0	7	–	3	–	0
Washington and Lee	5	–	1	–	0	6	–	4	–	0
William & Mary	5	–	1	–	0	7	–	3	–	0
No. 19 Clemson	3	–	1	–	0	7	–	3	–	0
Duke	4	–	2	–	0	5	–	4	–	1
South Carolina	5	–	3	–	0	6	–	4	–	0
Wake Forest	5	–	3	–	0	6	–	4	–	0
George Washington	2	–	3	–	1	2	–	6	–	1
North Carolina	2	–	3	–	0	2	–	8	–	0
West Virginia	2	–	3	–	0	5	–	5	–	0
NC State	2	–	6	–	0	3	–	7	–	0
Richmond	2	–	6	–	0	3	–	8	–	0
The Citadel	1	–	3	–	0	4	–	6	–	0
Furman	1	–	4	–	1	3	–	6	–	1
Davidson	1	–	5	–	0	1	–	8	–	0
VPI	1	–	7	–	0	2	–	8	–	0
+ – Conference co-champions; Rankings from AP Poll

1951 Southwest Conference football standings
	Conf.					Overall
Team	W		L		T	W		L		T
No. 11 TCU $	5	–	1	–	0	6	–	5	–	0
No. 9 Baylor	4	–	1	–	1	8	–	2	–	1
Texas	3	–	3	–	0	7	–	3	–	0
Rice	3	–	3	–	0	5	–	5	–	0
Texas A&M	1	–	3	–	2	5	–	3	–	2
Arkansas	2	–	4	–	0	5	–	5	–	0
SMU	1	–	4	–	1	3	–	6	–	1
$ – Conference champion; Rankings from AP poll

=== Independents ===
1951 Eastern college football independents records
	Conf.			Overall
Team	W	L	T	W		L		T
Bucknell		–		9	–	0	–	0
No. 6 Princeton		–		9	–	0	–	0
Susquehanna		–		6	–	0	–	0
Trenton State		–		6	–	0	–	0
Northeastern		–		6	–	0	–	1
No. 19 Holy Cross		–		8	–	2	–	0
Carnegie Tech		–		6	–	2	–	0
Hofstra		–		6	–	2	–	1
Cornell		–		6	–	3	–	0
No. 16 Boston University		–		6	–	4	–	0
Temple		–		6	–	4	–	0
Columbia		–		5	–	3	–	0
Villanova		–		5	–	3	–	0
Fordham		–		5	–	4	–	0
Franklin & Marshall		–		5	–	4	–	0
Penn		–		5	–	4	–	0
Penn State		–		5	–	4	–	0
Syracuse		–		5	–	4	–	0
Buffalo		–		4	–	4	–	0
Colgate		–		4	–	5	–	0
Dartmouth		–		4	–	5	–	0
Drexel		–		3	–	4	–	0
Harvard		–		3	–	5	–	1
Boston College		–		3	–	6	–	0
Yale		–		2	–	5	–	2
Pittsburgh		–		3	–	7	–	0
Geneva		–		2	–	5	–	0
Army		–		2	–	7	–	0
Brown		–		2	–	7	–	0
NYU		–		1	–	7	–	0
Tufts		–		0	–	7	–	2
Rankings from AP Poll

1951 Midwestern college football independents records
	Conf.			Overall
Team	W	L	T	W		L		T
No. 2 Michigan State		–		9	–	0	–	0
Xavier		–		9	–	0	–	1
Wabash		–		7	–	0	–	1
No. 13 Notre Dame		–		7	–	2	–	1
Dayton		–		7	–	3	–	0
Michigan Tech		–		4	–	2	–	1
Toledo		–		6	–	4	–	0
Washington University		–		5	–	4	–	0
Wayne		–		5	–	4	–	0
Bowling Green		–		4	–	4	–	1
Marquette		–		4	–	6	–	1
Baldwin–Wallace		–		3	–	5	–	0
John Carroll		–		3	–	6	–	0
Rose Poly		–		2	–	5	–	0
Youngstown		–		2	–	6	–	1
Rankings from AP Poll

1951 Southern college football independents records
	Conf.			Overall
Team	W	L	T	W		L		T
No. 13 Virginia		–		8	–	1	–	0
Maryland State		–		7	–	1	–	0
Arkansas State		–		10	–	2	–	0
Stetson		–		8	–	1	–	2
Florida State		–		6	–	2	–	0
Northeast Louisiana State		–		6	–	2	–	0
Miami (FL)		–		8	–	3	–	0
Tampa		–		7	–	3	–	1
Delaware		–		5	–	3	–	0
Memphis State		–		5	–	3	–	0
Sewanee		–		5	–	3	–	0
McNeese State		–		5	–	4	–	1
Louisville		–		5	–	4	–	0
Chattanooga		–		6	–	5	–	0
Navy		–		2	–	6	–	1
Delta State		–		1	–	8	–	0
Rankings from AP Poll

1951 Western college football independents records
	Conf.			Overall
Team	W	L	T	W		L		T
No. 14 San Francisco		–		9	–	0	–	0
La Verne		–		5	–	3	–	0
Pacific (CA)		–		6	–	5	–	0
Fresno State		–		5	–	5	–	0
Santa Clara		–		3	–	5	–	1
Hawaii		–		4	–	7	–	0
Loyola (CA)		–		3	–	6	–	0
San Jose State		–		2	–	7	–	1
Cal Poly San Dimas		–		1	–	6	–	0
Rankings from AP Poll

=== Minor conferences ===
Conference	Champion(s)	Record
California Collegiate Athletic Association	San Diego State	4–0
Central Church College Conference	Concordia (NE)	3–0
Central Intercollegiate Athletics Association	West Virginia State	5–0–1
Central Intercollegiate Athletic Conference	Kansas State Teachers; Pittsburg State	4–1
College Conference of Illinois	Illinois Wesleyan	5–0
Evergreen Conference	Pacific Lutheran; Puget Sound; Western Washington College	4–1
Far Western Conference	NBCA	3–1
Gulf Coast Conference	North Texas State	2–0
Indiana Collegiate Conference	Valparaiso	4–0
Iowa Intercollegiate Athletic Conference	Saint Ambrose	5–0
Kansas Collegiate Athletic Conference	College of Emporia	6–0
Lone Star Conference	East Texas State Teachers	5–0
Michigan Intercollegiate Athletic Association	Alma; Hope	4–1
Mid-American Conference	Cincinnati	3–0
Midwest Collegiate Athletic Conference	Lawrence	7–0
Minnesota Intercollegiate Athletic Conference	Gustavus Adolphus	6–0
Missouri Intercollegiate Athletic Association	Northeast Missouri State; Southwest Missouri State	4–0–1
Nebraska College Conference	Doane; Peru State	6–1
New Mexico Intercollegiate Conference	Eastern New Mexico	5–0
North Central Intercollegiate Athletic Conference	South Dakota	6–0
North Dakota College Athletic Conference	Dickinson State; Valley City State	4–0
Ohio Athletic Conference	Ohio Wesleyan	6–0
Ohio Valley Conference	Murray State College	5–1
Oklahoma Collegiate Athletic Conference	Northeastern State College (OK)	5–0
Oregon Collegiate Conference	Oregon College	—
Pennsylvania State Athletic Conference	Bloomsburg State Teachers	7–0
Pacific Northwest Conference	Lewis & Clark; Pacific (OR)	4–1
Rocky Mountain Athletic Conference	Colorado Mines	4–0
South Dakota Intercollegiate Conference	South Dakota Mines	6–0
Southern California Intercollegiate Athletic Conference	Occidental	4–0
Southern Intercollegiate Athletic Conference	Morris Brown	8–0
Southwestern Athletic Conference	Prairie View A&M College	6–1
State Teacher's College Conference of Minnesota	St. Cloud State Teachers	4–0
Texas Collegiate Athletic Conference	Abilene Christian; Howard Payne; Texas A&I	3–1
Wisconsin State Teachers College Conference	La Crosse State Teachers	6–0

=== Minor conference standings ===
1951 Badger-Illini Conference football standings
	Conf.					Overall
Team	W		L		T	W		L		T
Northwestern (WI) $	6	–	0	–	1	6	–	0	–	1
Milton	5	–	1	–	0	5	–	1	–	0
St. Procopius	3	–	1	–	2	3	–	2	–	2
Concordia (IL)	2	–	2	–	1	2	–	3	–	1
Mission House	2	–	4	–	0	2	–	4	–	0
Wisconsin–Extension	2	–	4	–	0	2	–	4	–	0
Wisconsin Tech	2	–	4	–	0	2	–	4	–	0
Aurora	0	–	6	–	0	0	–	7	–	0
$ – Conference champion

1951 California Collegiate Athletic Association football standings
	Conf.					Overall
Team	W		L		T	W		L		T
San Diego State $	4	–	0	–	0	10	–	0	–	1
Cal Poly	2	–	1	–	1	5	–	4	–	1
Pepperdine	2	–	1	–	1	5	–	4	–	1
Santa Barbara	1	–	3	–	0	5	–	4	–	0
Los Angeles State	0	–	4	–	0	1	–	7	–	0
$ – Conference champion

1951 Central Church College Conference football standings
	Conf.					Overall
Team	W		L		T	W		L		T
Concordia (NE) $	3	–	0	–	0	8	–	1	–	0
York (NE)	2	–	1	–	0	5	–	3	–	0
Tarkio	1	–	2	–	0	1	–	7	–	0
Dana	0	–	3	–	0	2	–	6	–	0
$ – Conference champion

1951 Central Intercollegiate Athletic Association football standings
	Conf.					Overall
Team	W		L		T	W		L		T
No. 8 West Virginia State $	5	–	0	–	1	6	–	2	–	1
No. 1 North Carolina A&T	5	–	1	–	0	7	–	1	–	1
No. 6 North Carolina College	5	–	1	–	1	7	–	2	–	1
Virginia Union	5	–	4	–	0	5	–	5	–	0
No. 19 Lincoln (PA)	4	–	2	–	0	6	–	2	–	0
No. 16 Virginia State	5	–	3	–	0	5	–	3	–	0
No. 18 Hampton	4	–	4	–	0	5	–	4	–	0
Winston-Salem State	4	–	2	–	0	4	–	4	–	0
Howard	5	–	4	–	0	5	–	4	–	0
Morgan State	3	–	4	–	0	3	–	5	–	0
Bluefield State	3	–	3	–	0	3	–	6	–	0
Johnson C. Smith	3	–	4	–	0	3	–	5	–	0
Delaware State	2	–	4	–	0	2	–	7	–	0
St. Augustine's	2	–	5	–	0	3	–	6	–	0
Shaw	1	–	8	–	0	1	–	9	–	0
Saint Paul's (VA)	0	–	7	–	0	0	–	8	–	0
$ – Conference champion; Conference standings were based on the Dickinson System.; Rankings from Associated Negro Press

1951 Central Intercollegiate Conference football standings
	Conf.					Overall
Team	W		L		T	W		L		T
Pittsburg State +	4	–	1	–	0	7	–	3	–	0
Emporia State +	4	–	1	–	0	5	–	3	–	1
Washburn	3	–	2	–	0	6	–	3	–	0
Fort Hays State	2	–	3	–	0	5	–	4	–	0
St. Benedict's	2	–	3	–	0	4	–	5	–	0
Southwestern (KS)	0	–	5	–	0	1	–	7	–	1
+ – Conference co-champions

1951 College Conference of Illinois football standings
	Conf.					Overall
Team	W		L		T	W		L		T
Illinois Wesleyan $	5	–	0	–	0	8	–	0	–	0
Wheaton (IL)	3	–	1	–	0	6	–	2	–	0
Lake Forest	3	–	2	–	0	3	–	4	–	1
Millikin	3	–	2	–	0	3	–	4	–	0
Illinois College	3	–	3	–	0	4	–	4	–	0
Augustana (IL)	2	–	3	–	0	3	–	4	–	1
North Central (IL)	2	–	3	–	0	3	–	5	–	0
Elmhurst	1	–	3	–	0	4	–	4	–	0
Carthage	0	–	5	–	0	0	–	9	–	0
$ – Conference champion

1951 Evergreen Conference football standings
	Conf.					Overall
Team	W		L		T	W		L		T
Western Washington +	4	–	1	–	0	8	–	1	–	0
Puget Sound +	4	–	1	–	0	7	–	1	–	0
Pacific Lutheran +	4	–	1	–	0	4	–	3	–	0
Whitworth	1	–	4	–	0	4	–	3	–	1
Eastern Washington	1	–	4	–	0	2	–	6	–	0
Central Washington	1	–	4	–	0	1	–	6	–	0
+ – Conference co-champions

1951 Far Western Conference football standings
	Conf.					Overall
Team	W		L		T	W		L		T
Cal Aggies $	3	–	1	–	0	5	–	4	–	0
San Francisco State	2	–	0	–	0	8	–	2	–	0
Humboldt State	2	–	1	–	0	4	–	3	–	1
Southern Oregon	1	–	2	–	0	1	–	8	–	0
Chico State	0	–	4	–	0	0	–	7	–	0
$ – Conference champion

1951 Gulf Coast Conference football standings
	Conf.					Overall
Team	W		L		T	W		L		T
North Texas State $	2	–	0	–	0	8	–	4	–	0
Midwestern (TX)	0	–	1	–	1	5	–	4	–	1
Trinity (TX)	0	–	1	–	1	4	–	5	–	1
$ – Conference champion

1951 Gulf States Conference football standings
	Conf.					Overall
Team	W		L		T	W		L		T
Mississippi Southern $	4	–	0	–	0	6	–	5	–	0
Southeastern Louisiana	4	–	1	–	0	7	–	3	–	0
Southwestern Louisiana	3	–	2	–	0	6	–	4	–	0
Louisiana Tech	2	–	3	–	0	4	–	5	–	0
Louisiana College	1	–	3	–	0	5	–	6	–	0
Northwestern State	0	–	5	–	0	1	–	8	–	0
$ – Conference champion

1951 Hoosier Conference football standings
	Conf.					Overall
Team	W		L		T	W		L		T
Hanover $	6	–	0	–	0	6	–	3	–	0
Indiana Central	4	–	2	–	0	5	–	3	–	0
Earlham	3	–	3	–	0	4	–	4	–	0
Manchester (IN)	3	–	3	–	0	4	–	4	–	0
Taylor	3	–	3	–	0	3	–	5	–	0
Franklin (IN)	1	–	5	–	0	2	–	6	–	0
Anderson (IN)	1	–	5	–	0	1	–	7	–	0
$ – Conference champion

1951 Indiana Collegiate Conference football standings
	Conf.					Overall
Team	W		L		T	W		L		T
Valparaiso $	4	–	0	–	0	9	–	0	–	0
Saint Joseph's (IN)	3	–	1	–	0	4	–	4	–	0
Butler	3	–	2	–	0	4	–	4	–	1
Evansville	1	–	1	–	0	5	–	5	–	0
Indiana State	0	–	3	–	1	0	–	6	–	1
Ball State	0	–	4	–	1	0	–	6	–	1
$ – Conference champion

1951 Interstate Intercollegiate Athletic Conference football standings
	Conf.					Overall
Team	W		L		T	W		L		T
Northern Illinois State	6	–	0	–	0	9	–	0	–	0
Western Illinois	4	–	1	–	1	7	–	1	–	1
Central Michigan	4	–	2	–	0	5	–	3	–	0
Eastern Illinois	2	–	2	–	2	4	–	2	–	2
Michigan State Normal	2	–	4	–	0	4	–	5	–	0
Illinois State Normal	1	–	4	–	1	3	–	5	–	1
Southern Illinois	0	–	6	–	0	0	–	9	–	0
$ – Conference champion

1951 Iowa Conference football standings
	Conf.					Overall
Team	W		L		T	W		L		T
Northern Division
Loras xy	5	–	0	–	0	6	–	4	–	0
Luther	4	–	1	–	0	6	–	3	–	0
Buena Vista	3	–	2	–	0	5	–	4	–	0
Wartburg	2	–	3	–	0	2	–	5	–	0
Upper Iowa	1	–	4	–	0	1	–	5	–	0
Westmar	0	–	5	–	0	1	–	6	–	1
Southern Division
St. Ambrose xy$	5	–	0	–	0	9	–	2	–	0
Iowa Wesleyan	3	–	2	–	0	5	–	2	–	1
Dubuque	3	–	2	–	0	3	–	4	–	0
Simpson (IA)	2	–	3	–	0	2	–	7	–	0
Parsons	1	–	4	–	0	4	–	4	–	0
Central (IA)	1	–	4	–	0	3	–	6	–	0
Championship: St. Ambrose 44, Loras 0
$ – Conference champion; x – Division champion/co-champions; y – Championship game participant

1951 Kansas Collegiate Athletic Conference football standings
	Conf.					Overall
Team	W		L		T	W		L		T
College of Emporia $	6	–	0	–	0	8	–	0	–	0
McPherson	5	–	1	–	0	7	–	2	–	0
Ottawa	4	–	2	–	0	6	–	3	–	0
Kansas Wesleyan	3	–	3	–	0	5	–	4	–	0
Bethany (KS)	2	–	4	–	0	4	–	5	–	0
Baker	1	–	5	–	0	2	–	7	–	0
Bethel (KS)	0	–	6	–	0	1	–	8	–	0
$ – Conference champion

1951 Lone Star Conference football standings
	Conf.					Overall
Team	W		L		T	W		L		T
East Texas State $	5	–	0	–	0	9	–	2	–	0
Southwest Texas State	2	–	2	–	1	6	–	3	–	1
Sam Houston State	2	–	2	–	1	4	–	4	–	1
Stephen F. Austin	2	–	3	–	0	4	–	4	–	1
Lamar Tech	2	–	3	–	0	4	–	6	–	0
Sul Ross	1	–	4	–	0	3	–	7	–	0
$ – Conference champion

1951 Mason–Dixon Conference football standings
	Conf.					Overall
Team	W		L		T	W		L		T
Western Maryland $	3	–	0	–	0	8	–	0	–	0
Randolph–Macon	3	–	1	–	1	5	–	3	–	1
Hampden–Sydney	1	–	1	–	2	4	–	3	–	2
Bridgewater	1	–	2	–	0	1	–	3	–	0
Johns Hopkins	0	–	2	–	1	2	–	5	–	1
Gallaudet	0	–	2	–	0	1	–	4	–	0
$ – Conference champion; Conference standings were based on the Dickinson Scoring System.

1951 Michigan Intercollegiate Athletic Association football standings
	Conf.					Overall
Team	W		L		T	W		L		T
Alma +	4	–	1	–	0	7	–	2	–	0
Hope +	4	–	1	–	0	5	–	4	–	0
Albion	3	–	2	–	0	6	–	2	–	0
Hillsdale	2	–	3	–	0	2	–	6	–	0
Kalamazoo	2	–	3	–	0	2	–	6	–	0
Adrian	0	–	5	–	0	0	–	6	–	0
+ – Conference co-champions

1951 Mid-Ohio League football standings
	Conf.					Overall
Team	W		L		T	W		L		T
Bluffton +	4	–	1	–	0	6	–	2	–	0
Findlay +	4	–	1	–	0	5	–	2	–	0
Ohio Northern	3	–	2	–	0	4	–	5	–	0
Cedarville	2	–	3	–	0	?	–	?	–	?
Ashland	2	–	3	–	0	2	–	5	–	1
Defiance	0	–	5	–	0	0	–	6	–	0
+ – Conference co-champions

1951 Midlands Conference football standings
	Conf.					Overall
Team	W		L		T	W		L		T
Lewis $	3	–	0	–	0	7	–	1	–	0
St. Ambrose	2	–	1	–	0	9	–	2	–	0
St. Norbert	2	–	2	–	0	5	–	4	–	0
Loras	1	–	3	–	0	6	–	4	–	0
Saint Joseph's (IN)	1	–	3	–	0	4	–	4	–	0
$ – Conference champion

1951 Midwest Athletic Association football standings
	Conf.					Overall
Team	W		L		T	W		L		T
No. 5 Central State (OH) $	3	–	0	–	0	7	–	2	–	0
No. 3 Tennessee A&I	3	–	1	–	0	8	–	2	–	0
Texas Southern	1	–	0	–	1	7	–	2	–	1
No. 10 Lincoln (MO)	1	–	2	–	0	7	–	2	–	0
Grambling	0	–	1	–	1	4	–	5	–	1
Kentucky State	0	–	4	–	0	2	–	7	–	0
$ – Conference champion; Rankings from the Pittsburgh Courier

1951 Midwest Conference football standings
	Conf.					Overall
Team	W		L		T	W		L		T
Lawrence $	7	–	0	–	0	7	–	0	–	0
Ripon	6	–	1	–	0	6	–	2	–	0
Knox	3	–	2	–	1	4	–	3	–	1
Carleton	3	–	3	–	0	4	–	3	–	0
Monmouth (IL)	2	–	3	–	1	3	–	3	–	2
Coe	2	–	4	–	0	3	–	5	–	0
Grinnell	1	–	5	–	0	1	–	6	–	1
Cornell (IA)	0	–	6	–	0	0	–	7	–	0
$ – Conference champion

1951 Minnesota Intercollegiate Athletic Conference football standings
	Conf.					Overall
Team	W		L		T	W		L		T
Gustavus Adolphus $	6	–	0	–	0	8	–	0	–	1
Minnesota–Duluth	5	–	1	–	0	5	–	2	–	1
St. Thomas (MN)	5	–	1	–	0	6	–	2	–	0
Saint John's (MN)	4	–	1	–	0	4	–	3	–	0
St. Olaf	3	–	2	–	0	3	–	4	–	0
Hamline	3	–	3	–	0	3	–	3	–	0
Concordia (MN)	2	–	4	–	0	4	–	4	–	0
Saint Mary's (MN)	1	–	5	–	0	1	–	6	–	0
Macalester	0	–	6	–	0	2	–	7	–	0
Augsburg	0	–	6	–	0	0	–	7	–	0
$ – Conference champion

1951 Minnesota Teachers College Conference football standings
	Conf.					Overall
Team	W		L		T	W		L		T
St. Cloud State $	4	–	0	–	0	5	–	2	–	0
Bemidji State	3	–	1	–	0	6	–	2	–	0
Mankato State	2	–	2	–	0	4	–	4	–	0
Moorhead State	1	–	3	–	0	3	–	4	–	0
Winona State	0	–	4	–	0	0	–	6	–	0
$ – Conference champion

1951 Missouri College Athletic Union football standings
	Conf.					Overall
Team	W		L		T	W		L		T
Missouri Valley $	4	–	0	–	0	10	–	1	–	0
William Jewell	3	–	1	–	0	8	–	3	–	0
Culver–Stockton	2	–	2	–	0	3	–	4	–	0
Central (MO)	1	–	3	–	0	1	–	8	–	0
Tarkio	0	–	4	–	0	1	–	7	–	0
$ – Conference champion

1951 Missouri Intercollegiate Athletic Association football standings
	Conf.					Overall
Team	W		L		T	W		L		T
Kirksville State +	4	–	0	–	1	7	–	1	–	1
SW Missouri State +	4	–	0	–	1	6	–	3	–	1
Missouri Mines	3	–	2	–	0	3	–	5	–	0
NW Missouri State	2	–	3	–	0	2	–	6	–	1
SE Missouri State	0	–	4	–	1	2	–	5	–	1
Central Missouri State	0	–	4	–	1	0	–	7	–	2
$ – Conference champion

1951 Missouri Valley Conference football standings
	Conf.					Overall
Team	W		L		T	W		L		T
Tulsa $	4	–	0	–	0	9	–	2	–	0
Drake	3	–	1	–	0	7	–	2	–	0
Oklahoma A&M	3	–	2	–	0	3	–	7	–	0
Houston	2	–	2	–	0	6	–	5	–	0
Detroit	2	–	4	–	0	4	–	7	–	0
Wichita	2	–	4	–	0	2	–	7	–	0
Bradley	0	–	3	–	0	4	–	5	–	0
$ – Conference champion

1951 Montana Collegiate Conference football standings
	Conf.					Overall
Team	W		L		T	W		L		T
Carroll (MT) $	4	–	0	–	0	6	–	1	–	1
Rocky Mountain	3	–	1	–	0	?	–	?	–	?
Western Montana	2	–	2	–	0	?	–	?	–	?
Eastern Montana	1	–	3	–	0	2	–	3	–	0
Montana Mines	0	–	4	–	0	?	–	?	–	?
$ – Conference champion

1951 Nebraska College Conference football standings
	Conf.					Overall
Team	W		L		T	W		L		T
Peru State +	6	–	1	–	0	8	–	2	–	0
Doane +	6	–	1	–	0	7	–	2	–	0
Wayne State (NE)	5	–	2	–	0	6	–	3	–	0
Kearney State	4	–	3	–	0	5	–	3	–	0
Hastings	4	–	3	–	0	5	–	4	–	0
Nebraska Wesleyan	2	–	5	–	0	2	–	8	–	0
Chadron State	1	–	6	–	0	1	–	8	–	0
Midland	0	–	7	–	0	1	–	7	–	0
+ – Conference co-champions

1951 New Mexico Conference football standings
	Conf.					Overall
Team	W		L		T	W		L		T
Eastern New Mexico $	5	–	0	–	0	8	–	1	–	0
New Mexico Western	3	–	1	–	1	6	–	2	–	1
Adams State	3	–	2	–	0	3	–	6	–	0
Panhandle A&M	2	–	3	–	0	6	–	4	–	0
New Mexico Highlands	1	–	3	–	1	3	–	4	–	1
New Mexico Military	0	–	5	–	0	2	–	6	–	0
$ – Conference champion

1951 North Central Conference football standings
	Conf.					Overall
Team	W		L		T	W		L		T
South Dakota $	6	–	0	–	0	7	–	1	–	0
South Dakota State	4	–	1	–	1	8	–	1	–	1
Iowa State Teachers	3	–	3	–	0	3	–	4	–	0
North Dakota	2	–	3	–	0	2	–	4	–	0
Morningside	2	–	4	–	0	3	–	5	–	1
North Dakota State	1	–	4	–	1	1	–	5	–	1
Augustana (SD)	1	–	4	–	0	3	–	5	–	0
$ – Conference champion

1951 North Dakota Intercollegiate Conference football standings
	Conf.					Overall
Team	W		L		T	W		L		T
Dickinson State +	4	–	0	–	0	4	–	3	–	0
Valley City State +	4	–	0	–	0	4	–	3	–	0
Minot State	3	–	2	–	0	4	–	3	–	0
Ellendale	2	–	2	–	0	2	–	2	–	0
Wahpeton Science	1	–	2	–	1	1	–	3	–	1
Jamestown	1	–	3	–	1	1	–	5	–	1
Mayville State	1	–	3	–	0	1	–	3	–	0
Bismarck JC	0	–	4	–	0	0	–	4	–	0
+ – Conference co-champions

1951 North State Conference football standings
	Conf.					Overall
Team	W		L		T	W		L		T
Lenoir Rhyne $	6	–	0	–	0	10	–	1	–	0
Elon	4	–	2	–	0	6	–	3	–	0
Catawba	3	–	2	–	0	5	–	5	–	0
Appalachian State	3	–	3	–	0	6	–	3	–	0
East Carolina	1	–	4	–	0	4	–	6	–	0
Western Carolina	1	–	4	–	0	3	–	6	–	0
Guilford	1	–	4	–	0	1	–	7	–	0
$ – Conference champion

1951 Northwest Conference football standings
	Conf.					Overall
Team	W		L		T	W		L		T
Pacific (OR) +	4	–	1	–	0	8	–	2	–	0
Lewis & Clark +	4	–	1	–	0	6	–	2	–	0
College of Idaho	3	–	2	–	0	5	–	4	–	0
Linfield	1	–	3	–	1	3	–	3	–	3
Whitman	1	–	3	–	1	3	–	5	–	1
Willamette	1	–	4	–	0	3	–	5	–	0
+ – Conference co-champions

1951 Ohio Athletic Conference football standings
	Conf.					Overall
Team	W		L		T	W		L		T
Ohio Wesleyan $	6	–	0	–	0	8	–	1	–	0
Heidelberg	3	–	0	–	1	7	–	1	–	1
Mount Union	2	–	1	–	0	3	–	4	–	1
Muskingum	3	–	2	–	1	5	–	2	–	1
Denison	3	–	2	–	1	4	–	3	–	1
Oberlin	2	–	2	–	0	4	–	4	–	0
Otterbein	2	–	2	–	1	2	–	4	–	2
Wooster	2	–	3	–	0	6	–	3	–	0
Akron	1	–	3	–	0	1	–	8	–	0
Wittenberg	1	–	5	–	0	4	–	6	–	0
Capital	0	–	2	–	1	2	–	4	–	1
Marietta	0	–	3	–	1	2	–	4	–	1
$ – Conference champion

1951 Ohio Valley Conference football standings
	Conf.					Overall
Team	W		L		T	W		L		T
Murray State $	5	–	1	–	0	8	–	1	–	0
Eastern Kentucky	4	–	2	–	0	7	–	3	–	0
Marshall	4	–	2	–	0	5	–	5	–	1
Evansville	3	–	3	–	0	5	–	5	–	0
Tennessee Tech	3	–	3	–	0	5	–	5	–	1
Western Kentucky	2	–	4	–	0	4	–	5	–	0
Morehead State	0	–	6	–	0	1	–	7	–	0
$ – Conference champion

1951 Oklahoma Collegiate Conference football standings
	Conf.					Overall
Team	W		L		T	W		L		T
Northeastern State $	5	–	0	–	0	9	–	1	–	0
SW Oklahoma State	3	–	2	–	0	4	–	6	–	0
SE Oklahoma State	3	–	2	–	0	3	–	6	–	0
Central State (OK)	2	–	3	–	0	2	–	7	–	0
NW Oklahoma State	1	–	3	–	1	4	–	4	–	1
East Central	0	–	4	–	1	1	–	6	–	1
$ – Conference champion

1951 Oregon Collegiate Conference football standings
	Conf.					Overall
Team	W		L		T	W		L		T
Oregon College $	3	–	0	–	0	6	–	0	–	1
Oregon Tech	2	–	1	–	0	6	–	3	–	0
Vanport	1	–	2	–	0	3	–	5	–	0
Eastern Oregon	0	–	3	–	0	3	–	6	–	0
$ – Conference champion

1951 Pennsylvania State Teachers College Conference football standings
	Conf.					Overall
Team	W		L		T	W		L		T
Bloomsburg $	7	–	0	–	0	8	–	0	–	0
California (PA)	4	–	1	–	0	7	–	2	–	0
Clarion	3	–	1	–	0	4	–	2	–	1
West Chester	3	–	1	–	0	8	–	2	–	0
Kutztown	3	–	2	–	0	5	–	2	–	0
Shippensburg	4	–	3	–	0	5	–	3	–	0
East Stroudsburg	2	–	2	–	0	4	–	4	–	0
Slippery Rock	1	–	2	–	0	3	–	4	–	0
Indiana (PA)	5	–	3	–	1	5	–	3	–	1
Edinboro	0	–	3	–	1	0	–	5	–	1
Mansfield	1	–	4	–	0	2	–	5	–	0
Millersville	3	–	5	–	0	3	–	5	–	0
Cheyney	0	–	3	–	0	2	–	4	–	0
Lock Haven	0	–	6	–	0	0	–	8	–	0
$ – Conference champion; Conference standings were based on the Saylor system of ratings.

1951 Rocky Mountain Conference football standings
	Conf.					Overall
Team	W		L		T	W		L		T
Colorado Mines $	4	–	0	–	0	7	–	2	–	0
Colorado College	3	–	2	–	0	4	–	5	–	0
Idaho State	3	–	2	–	0	5	–	4	–	0
Colorado State–Greeley	2	–	3	–	0	4	–	3	–	0
Western State (CO)	2	–	3	–	0	3	–	5	–	0
Montana State	0	–	4	–	0	0	–	7	–	0
$ – Conference champion

1951 Smoky Mountain Conference football standings
	Conf.					Overall
Team	W		L		T	W		L		T
Emory and Henry $	2	–	0	–	0	9	–	0	–	1
East Tennessee State	1	–	1	–	0	4	–	5	–	0
Carson–Newman	0	–	2	–	0	4	–	6	–	0
$ – Conference champion

1951 South Dakota Intercollegiate Conference football standings
	Conf.					Overall
Team	W		L		T	W		L		T
South Dakota Mines $	6	–	0	–	0	8	–	0	–	0
Southern State (SD)	6	–	1	–	0	6	–	1	–	1
Black Hills	3	–	1	–	0	6	–	2	–	0
Northern State	3	–	2	–	0	4	–	4	–	0
Huron	3	–	3	–	0	5	–	3	–	0
Yankton	3	–	3	–	0	3	–	4	–	0
General Beadle	1	–	4	–	0	1	–	5	–	0
Sioux Falls	0	–	5	–	0	0	–	7	–	0
Dakota Wesleyan	0	–	6	–	0	0	–	6	–	0
$ – Conference champion

1951 Southern California Intercollegiate Athletic Conference football standings
	Conf.					Overall
Team	W		L		T	W		L		T
Occidental $	4	–	0	–	0	6	–	2	–	0
Redlands	2	–	2	–	0	3	–	5	–	0
Whittier	2	–	2	–	0	2	–	7	–	0
Caltech	1	–	3	–	0	2	–	5	–	0
Pomona	1	–	3	–	0	1	–	7	–	0
$ – Conference champion

1951 Southern Intercollegiate Athletic Conference football standings
	Conf.					Overall
Team	W		L		T	W		L		T
No. 2 Morris Brown $	8	–	0	–	0	10	–	1	–	0
No. 10 Xavier (LA)	5	–	1	–	0	8	–	1	–	0
No. 3 Florida A&M	4	–	1	–	0	7	–	1	–	1
No. 22 Fisk	5	–	2	–	0	6	–	2	–	0
No. 23 South Carolina State	4	–	2	–	0	5	–	2	–	0
No. 12 Bethune–Cookman	4	–	2	–	0	7	–	2	–	0
No. 15 Benedict	5	–	3	–	0	7	–	3	–	0
No. 24 Tuskegee	5	–	3	–	0	6	–	3	–	0
Alabama A&M	3	–	3	–	0	3	–	5	–	0
Lane	2	–	2	–	0	3	–	4	–	0
Morehouse	2	–	3	–	0	3	–	4	–	0
Clark (GA)	3	–	5	–	0	3	–	5	–	0
Allen	1	–	5	–	0	3	–	7	–	0
Knoxville	0	–	5	–	0	0	–	8	–	1
Alabama State	0	–	6	–	0	0	–	8	–	0
Fort Valley State	0	–	0	–	0	1	–	8	–	0
$ – Conference champion; Rankings from Associated Negro Press

1951 Southwestern Athletic Conference football standings
	Conf.					Overall
Team	W		L		T	W		L		T
No. 4 Prairie View A&M $	6	–	1	–	0	9	–	1	–	0
No. 17 Texas College	4	–	1	–	2	5	–	3	–	2
No. 21 Southern	4	–	1	–	2	5	–	4	–	2
No. 20 Arkansas AM&N	4	–	2	–	1	5	–	4	–	1
Langston	4	–	3	–	0	4	–	5	–	0
Wiley	2	–	4	–	1	3	–	5	–	1
Samuel Huston	1	–	6	–	0	1	–	8	–	0
Bishop	0	–	7	–	0	0	–	9	–	0
$ – Conference champion; Rankings from Associated Negro Press

1951 Texas Conference football standings
	Conf.					Overall
Team	W		L		T	W		L		T
Abilene Christian +	3	–	1	–	0	6	–	4	–	0
Texas A&I +	3	–	1	–	0	5	–	4	–	0
Howard Payne +	3	–	1	–	0	4	–	4	–	0
McMurry	1	–	3	–	0	3	–	7	–	0
Austin	0	–	4	–	0	2	–	7	–	0
+ – Conference co-champions

1951 Virginia Little Six Conference football standings
	Conf.					Overall
Team	W		L		T	W		L		T
Emory and Henry $	2	–	0	–	0	9	–	0	–	1
Randolph–Macon	1	–	1	–	1	5	–	3	–	1
Hampden–Sydney	1	–	1	–	1	4	–	3	–	2
Bridgewater	0	–	2	–	0	1	–	3	–	0
$ – Conference champion

1951 West Virginia Intercollegiate Athletic Conference football standings
	Conf.					Overall
Team	W		L		T	W		L		T
Morris Harvey $	4	–	0	–	0	6	–	3	–	1
West Virginia Tech	5	–	1	–	0	7	–	1	–	0
Potomac State	3	–	1	–	0	4	–	1	–	0
Fairmont State	4	–	2	–	0	6	–	3	–	0
Davis & Elkins	4	–	2	–	0	4	–	4	–	0
West Liberty State	2	–	2	–	0	3	–	5	–	0
Glenville State	3	–	4	–	0	3	–	4	–	0
Shepherd	1	–	3	–	0	3	–	5	–	0
Concord	1	–	5	–	0	1	–	7	–	0
Salem	0	–	6	–	0	0	–	8	–	0
Bethany (WV) *	0	–	1	–	0	3	–	5	–	0
$ – Conference champion; * – Did not qualify for conference standings Conference standings based on power ratings

1951 Wisconsin State College Conference football standings
	Conf.					Overall
Team	W		L		T	W		L		T
La Crosse State $	6	–	0	–	0	7	–	2	–	0
Stout Institute	5	–	1	–	0	7	–	1	–	0
Whitewater State	3	–	2	–	0	3	–	3	–	0
Superior State	3	–	2	–	1	4	–	2	–	2
Platteville State	2	–	2	–	2	2	–	3	–	2
Milwaukee State	1	–	2	–	3	1	–	4	–	3
Eau Claire State	2	–	4	–	0	3	–	5	–	0
River Falls State	1	–	3	–	2	3	–	3	–	2
Stevens Point State	0	–	3	–	3	0	–	3	–	4
Oshkosh State	0	–	4	–	1	0	–	4	–	1
$ – Conference champion

1951 Yankee Conference football standings
	Conf.					Overall
Team	W		L		T	W		L		T
Maine $	3	–	0	–	1	6	–	0	–	1
UMass	2	–	0	–	0	3	–	4	–	1
Connecticut	2	–	1	–	0	4	–	4	–	0
New Hampshire	1	–	2	–	1	5	–	2	–	1
Rhode Island	1	–	3	–	0	3	–	5	–	0
Vermont	0	–	3	–	0	0	–	7	–	0
$ – Conference champion

== Bowl games ==
All seven games played were on Tuesday, January 1, 1952.

=== Major bowls ===
Bowl game	Winning team		Losing team	
Cotton Bowl	No. 15 Kentucky	20	No. 11 TCU	7
Sugar Bowl	No. 3 Maryland	28	No. 1 Tennessee	13
Rose Bowl	No. 4 Illinois	40	No. 7 Stanford	7
Orange Bowl	No. 5 Georgia Tech	17	No. 9 Baylor	14

=== Other bowls ===
Bowl game	Winning team		Losing team	
Gator Bowl	Miami (FL)	14	No. 20 Clemson	0
Sun Bowl	Texas Tech	25	Pacific (CA)	14
Tangerine Bowl	Stetson	35	Arkansas State	20

== Heisman Trophy voting ==
The Heisman Trophy is given to the year's most outstanding player

Player	School	Position	1st	2nd	3rd	Total
Dick Kazmaier	Princeton	HB	506	107	45	1,777
Hank Lauricella	Tennessee	HB	45	108	73	424
Babe Parilli	Kentucky	QB	32	79	90	344
Bill McColl	Stanford	E	42	56	75	313
Johnny Bright	Drake	HB	31	49	39	230
Johnny Karras	Illinois	HB	15	60	58	223
Larry Isbell	Baylor	QB	29	24	28	163
Hugh McElhenny	Washington	HB	18	17	15	103
Ollie Matson	San Francisco	HB	6	28	21	95
Don Coleman	Michigan State	OT	6	23	29	93

== Statistical leaders ==
=== Individual ===
==== Total offense ====
The following players were the individual leaders in total offense during the 1951 season:

Major college

Rank	Player	Team	Total Yds
1	Dick Kazmaier	Princeton	1,827
2	Don Klosterman	Loyola (CA)	1,803
3	Bill Wade	Vanderbilt	1,646
4	Zeke Bratkowski	Georgia	1,634
5	Tom Dublinski	Utah	1,633
6	Hair	Clemson	1,579
7	Morris	Tulsa	1,572
8	Ollie Matson	San Francisco	1,566
9	Larry Isbell	Baylor	1,556
10	Johnny Bright	Drake	1,553

==== Passing ====
The following players were the individual leaders in pass completions during the 1951 season:

Major college

Rank	Player	Team	Compl.	Att.	Pct. Compl.	Yds.	Int.	TDs
1	Don Klosterman	Loyola (CA)	159	315	50.5%	1,843	21	9
2	Babe Parilli	Kentucky	136	239	56.9%	1,643	12	19
3	Don Leahy	Marquette	127	232	54.7%	1,543	15	12
4	Tom Dublinski	Utah	124	239	51.9%	1,418	11	14
5	Don Babers	Oklahoma A&M	121	247	49.0%	1,352	13	10
6	Hart	Hardin-Simmons	117	229	51.1%	1,380	14	8
7	Zeke Bratkowski	Georgia	116	248	46.8%	1,578	29	6
8	Bill Wade	Vanderbilt	111	223	49.8%	1,609	10	13
9	Fred Benners	SMU	108	204	52.9%	1,306	12	9
10	Larry Isbell	Baylor	105	214	49.1%	1,430	18	10

==== Rushing ====
The following players were the individual leaders in rushing yards during the 1951 season:

Major college

Rank	Player	Team	Yds	Rushes	Avg
1	Ollie Matson	San Francisco	1,566	245	6.39
2	Dunny Goode	Hardin-Simmons	1,399	270	5.18
3	Howard Waugh	Tulsa	1,118	165	6.78
4	Shannon	Houston	1,059	144	7.35
5	Thomas McCormick	Pacific	1,001	191	5.24
6	Hugh McElhenny	Washington	936	169	5.54
7	Johnny Bright	Drake	927	160	5.79
8	John Kastan	Boston University	886	133	6.66
9	Hank Lauricella	Tennessee	881	111	7.94
10	Buck McPhail	Oklahoma	865	101	8.56

==== Receiving ====
The following players were the individual leaders in receptions during the 1951 season:

Major college

Rank	Player	Team	Receptions	Receiving yards	TDs
1	Dewey McConnell	Wyoming	47	725	8
2	Ed Barker	Washington State	46	864	9
3	Jim David	Colorado A&M	46	551	5
4	Karl Kluckhohn	Colgate	45	616	5
5	Fred Snyder	Loyola (CA)	45	539	2
6	Bill McColl	Stanford	42	607	7
7	Harry Babcock	Georgia	41	666	2
8	Ben Roderick	Vanderbilt	40	627	5
8	George Wooden	Oklahoma A&M	40	502	2
8	Wesley Bomm	Columbia	40	444	1
8	Jim Walker	Texas Western	40	440	3

==== Scoring ====
The following players were the individual leaders in scoring during the 1951 season:

Major college

Rank	Player	Team	Pts	TD	PAT	FG
1	Ollie Matson	San Francisco	126	21	0	0
2	Hugh McElhenny	Washington	125	17	23	0
3	Bill Parsons	Tulsa	96	16	0	0
4	Ray Oliverson	BYU	90	15	0	0
4	John "Babe" Kastan	Boston University	90	15	0	0
6	Johnny Bright	Drake	84	14	0	0
6	Frank Goode	Hardin-Simmons	84	14	0	0
6	Eddie Macon	Pacific	84	14	0	0
6	Harold "Herky" Payne	Tennessee	84	14	0	0

=== Team ===
==== Total offense ====
The following teams were the leaders in total offense during the 1951 season:

Major college

Rank	Team	Yards per game
1	Tulsa	480.1
2	Maryland	423.3
3	Princeton	417.0
4	Arizona State	416.2
5	Cincinnati	408.3
6	Oklahoma	406.2
7	Holy Cross	405.5
8	Michigan State	403.0
9	Pacific	401.6
10	California	398.0

==== Total defense ====
The following teams were the leaders in total defense during the 1951 season:

Major college

Rank	Team	Yards per game
1	Wisconsin	154.8
2	Princeton	176.9
3	Georgia Tech	199.1
4	Kentucky	205.9
5	San Francisco	209.4
6	Illinois	217.1
7	Holy Cross	221.2
8	Oklahoma	221.5
9	Virginia	221.7
10	Denver	223.0

== See also ==
- 1951 College Football All-America Team
