= List of Maryland Terrapins in the NFL draft =

This is a list of former Maryland Terrapins college football players who have been selected in the NFL draft.

== Key ==
B	Back	K	Kicker	NT	Nose tackle
C	Center	LB	Linebacker	FB	Fullback
DB	Defensive back	P	Punter	HB	Halfback
DE	Defensive end	QB	Quarterback	WR	Wide receiver
DT	Defensive tackle	RB	Running back	G	Guard
E	End	T	Offensive tackle	TE	Tight end

Inducted to the Pro Football Hall of Fame
Inducted to the College Football Hall of Fame
Selected to All-Pro team
Selected to Pro Bowl

== Selections ==
Year	Round	Pick	Overall	Player	Team	Position	Notes
1937	6	1	51	Bill Guckeyson	Philadelphia Eagles	B	
1944	12	5	114	Tommy Mont	New York Giants	B	
1945	18 (Note: There is a conflict between references for this data. The DatabaseFootball.com source records that Bill Byrd was the 10th pick in the 18th round, 185th overall, while the media guide source records instead that Byrd was drafted in the 16th, without providing further data. It is assumed that the DatabaseFootball.com source is more authoritative, because it lists all draft picks in numerical order.)	10	185	Bill Byrd	New York Giants	C	
1945	26 (Note: There is a conflict between references for this data. The DatabaseFootball.com source records that Lu Gambino was the 8th pick in the 24th round, 271st overall, while the media guide source records instead that Gambino was drafted in the 24th, without providing further data. It is assumed that the DatabaseFootball.com source is more authoritative, because it lists all draft picks in numerical order.)	8	271	Lu Gambino	Chicago Bears	B	
1946	28	2	262	Don Gleasner	Boston Yanks	E	
1947	13 (Note: There is a conflict between references for this data. The DatabaseFootball.com source records that Emile Fritz was the 10th pick in the 13th round, 115th overall, while the media guide source records instead that Fritz was drafted in the 11th, without providing further data. It is assumed that the DatabaseFootball.com source is more authoritative, because it lists all draft picks in numerical order.)	10	115	Emile Fritz	Chicago Bears	G	
1947	30	9	284	John Wright	New York Giants	B	
1948	30	4	279	Harry Bonk	Boston Yanks	B	
1950	20	4	252	Fred Davis	Detroit Lions	E	
1950	25	12	325	Jim Brasher	Cleveland Browns	C	
1950	26	5	331	Earl Roth	Washington Redskins	B	
1951	2	11	25	Ray Krouse	New York Giants	T	Pro Bowl (1954)
1951	4	8	46	Elmer Wingate	New York Yanks	E	
1951	9	3	101	Jake Rowden	Washington Redskins	C	
1951	10	13	123	Chester Gierula	Cleveland Browns	G	
1952	1	6	6	Ed Modzelewski	Pittsburgh Steelers	B	
1952	6	1	62	Dave Cianelli	Dallas Texans	C	
1952	6	6	67	Ed Kensler	Washington Redskins	G	
1952	13	11	156	Tom Cosgrove	Cleveland Browns	C	
1952	14	12	169	Joe Moss	Los Angeles Rams	T	
1952	16	5	186	Pete Ladygo	Pittsburgh Steelers	G	
1952	23	7	272	Paul Nestor	Chicago Bears	T	
1952	24	1	278	Bob Ward	Dallas Texans	G	College Football Hall of Fame
1952	26	3	304	Charley Fry	Chicago Cardinals	T	
1952	27	11	324	Bill Maletzky	Cleveland Browns	G	
1952	28	7	332	Karney Scioscia	Chicago Bears	B	
1952	30	7	356	Bob Shemonski	Chicago Bears	B	
1953	1	3	3	Jack Scarbath	Washington Redskins	C	College Football Hall of Fame
1953	2	3	16	Dick Modzelewski	Washington Redskins	T	Pro Bowl (1964)
1953	4	5	42	Lloyd Colteryahn	Pittsburgh Steelers	E	
1953	4	9	46	Ed Fullerton	San Francisco 49ers	B	
1953	5	5	54	Stan Jones	Chicago Bears	T	7× Pro Bowl (1955–1961); 4× All-Pro (1955, 1956, 1959, 1960); College Football Hall of Fame; HOF '91
1953	7	4	77	John Alderton	Pittsburgh Steelers	E	
1953	8	3	88	Lew Weidensaul	Washington Redskins	E	
1953	8	11	96	Bob Morgan	Los Angeles Rams	T	
1953	22	5	258	Ed O'Connor	Pittsburgh Steelers	T	
1953	25	2	291	Art Hurd	Washington Redskins	G	
1954	1	11	11	Bernie Faloney	San Francisco 49ers	B	
1954	2	11	24	Chet Hanulak	Cleveland Browns	B	
1954	4	4	41	Dick Nolan	New York Giants	B	
1954	4	10	47	Charlie Boxold	San Francisco 49ers	B	
1954	4	2	39	Ralph Felton	Washington Redskins	B	
1954	12	11	144	Tom Breunich	Cleveland Browns	T	
1954	13	6	151	Charles Lattimer	Pittsburgh Steelers	C	
1954	26	2	303	Ralph Baierl	Green Bay Packers	T	
1955	1	9	9	Dick Bielski	Philadelphia Eagles	B	Pro Bowl (1961)
1955	2	2	15	Ron Waller	Los Angeles Rams	B	
1955	6	1	62	Jack Bowersox	Chicago Cardinals	G	
1955	8	1	86	John Irvine	Chicago Cardinals	C	
1955	8	11	96	Bill Walker	Detroit Lions	E	
1955	13	1	146	Tom McLuckie	Chicago Cardinals	G	
1955	15	8	177	Don Brougher	Philadelphia Eagles	C	
1955	17	4	197	Lynn Beightol	Green Bay Packers	B	
1955	22	11	264	George Albrecht	Detroit Lions	B	
1955	26	9	310	George Palahunik	Philadelphia Eagles	G	
1956	1	4	4	Bob Pellegrini	Philadelphia Eagles	C	College Football Hall of Fame
1956	1	12	12	Ed Vereb	Washington Redskins	B	
1956	8	7	92	Russ Dennis	Green Bay Packers	E	
1956	10	7	116	Bob Laughery	Green Bay Packers	B	
1956	11	3	124	Tom Selep	Detroit Lions	B	
1957	4	9	46	Mike Sandusky	San Francisco 49ers	T	Pro Bowl (1960)
1957	14	3	160	Joe Lazzarino	Los Angeles Rams	T	
1957	15	10	179	Gene Alderton	Detroit Lions	C	
1957	16	11	192	Ed Heuring	Chicago Bears	E	
1957	17	4	197	Frank Tamburello	Cleveland Browns	B	
1957	18	11	216	Al Wharton	Chicago Bears	G	
1957	23	12	277	Jack Healy	New York Giants	B	
1957	29	3	340	Howie Dare	Green Bay Packers	B	
1958	3	4	29	Ed Cooke	Chicago Bears	E	
1958	3	12	37	Don Healy	Chicago Bears	T	
1958	28	4	329	Wilbur Main	Chicago Bears	B	
1959	6	8	68	Fred Cole	Chicago Bears	G	
1959	14	5	161	Kurt Schwarz	Washington Redskins	G	
1960	3	11	35	Rod Breedlove	San Francisco 49ers	G	Pro Bowl (1962)
1961	16	13	223	Roger Shoals	Cleveland Browns	T	
1961	17	2	226	Everett Cloud	Dallas Cowboys	B	
1962	1	4	4	Gary Collins	Cleveland Browns	E	3× Pro Bowl (1965, 1966, 1969); 3× All-Pro (1965, 1966, 1969); NFL All-Decade (1960s)
1962	7	6	90	Bill Kirchiro	St. Louis Cardinals	G	
1962	14	10	192	Jim Davidson	Detroit Lions	B	
1962	15	6	202	Dick Barlund	St. Louis Cardinals	E	
1963	2	7	21	Tom Brown	Green Bay Packers	B	Super Bowl I, II Champion
1963	2	14	28	Walter Rock	San Francisco 49ers	G	Pro Bowl (1965)
1963	3	4	32	Dave Crossan	Philadelphia Eagles	G	
1963	15	7	203	Harry Butsko	Washington Redskins	LB	
1964	7	3	87	Dick Shiner	Washington Redskins	QB	
1964	14	2	184	Ernie Arizzi	Philadelphia Eagles	B	
1965	9	4	116	Ken Ambrusko	Chicago Bears	B	
1965	14	14	196	Jerry Fishman	Baltimore Colts	LB	
1966	2	14	30	Tom Cichowski	Green Bay Packers	T	
1967	5	18	125	Dick Absher	Philadelphia Eagles	TE	
1967	14	16	357	Bo Hickey (Note: Hickey left Maryland in 1966 before his junior season after being ruled academically ineligible and was playing minor league football for the Brooklyn Dodgers of the Continental Football League when he was drafted.)	St. Louis Cardinals	FB	
1968	13	17	344	Tom Myslinski	New York Jets	G	
1969	10	13	247	Ron Pearson	Chicago Bears	TE	
1969	11	10	270	Alan Pastrana	Denver Broncos	QB	
1969	12	15	301	Harry Blackney	New York Giants	RB	
1970	7	17	173	Roland Merritt	Washington Redskins	WR	
1970	9	17	225	Ralph Sonntag	Washington Redskins	T	
1972	8	5	187	Guy Roberts	Houston Oilers	LB	
1972	15	23	387	Larry Marshall	Kansas City Chiefs	DB	
1974	7	12	168	Bart Purvis	Green Bay Packers	T	
1974	14	4	342	Paul Vellano	Chicago Bears	DT	
1975	1	2	2	Randy White	Dallas Cowboys	DT	9× Pro Bowl (1977–1985); 9× All-Pro (1977–1985); NFL All-Decade (1980s); NFL 100th Anniversary All-Time Team; Super Bowl XII Champion, Super Bowl MVP; College Football Hall of Fame; HOF '94
1975	3	24	76	Louis Carter	Oakland Raiders	RB	
1975	3	20	72	Steve Mike-Mayer	San Francisco 49ers	K	
1975	3	26	78	Walther White	Pittsburgh Steelers	TE	
1975	5	3	107	Stan Rogers	Denver Broncos	T	
1975	6	5	135	Bob Avellini	Chicago Bears	QB	
1975	10	2	236	Phil Wagenheim	Baltimore Colts	P	
1975	10	14	248	Ken Schroy	Philadelphia Eagles	DB	
1975	12	17	303	Harry Walters	Denver Broncos	LB	
1975	16	26	416	Robert Smith	Baltimore Colts	DB	
1975	17	24	440	Frank Russell	Baltimore Colts	WR	
1976	11	22	313	Rick Jennings	Oakland Raiders	RB	Super Bowl XI Champion
1977	1	7	7	Joe Campbell	New Orleans Saints	DE	Super Bowl XV Champion
1977	3	10	66	Tim Wilson	Houston Oilers	RB	
1977	3	12	68	Ed Fulton	Los Angeles Rams	G	
1977	6	23	162	Tom Schick	New Orleans Saints	G	
1977	12	6	313	Dave Conrad	New York Jets	T	
1978	4	21	105	Mark Manges	Los Angeles Rams	QB	
1978	10	27	277	Vince Kinney	Denver Broncos	WR	
1978	12	21	327	Brad Carr	Pittsburgh Steelers	LB	
1979	2	16	444	Steve Atkins	Green Bay Packers	RB	
1979	3	15	71	Charles Johnson	Green Bay Packers	DT	
1980	10	5	254	Larry Stewart	Baltimore Colts	T	
1981	3	22	78	Lloyd Burruss	Kansas City Chiefs	DB	Pro Bowl (1986); 2× All-Pro (1986, 1988)
1981	4	24	107	Eric Sievers	San Diego Chargers	TE	
1981	6	17	155	Sam Johnson	Detroit Lions	DB	
1981	11	2	278	Ed Gall	New York Jets	DT	
1982	9	9	232	Darnell Dialey	St. Louis Cardinals	LB	
1983	3	9	65	John Tice	New Orleans Saints	TE	
1983	4	12	96	Mark Duda	St. Louis Cardinals	DT	
1983	7	12	180	Gurnest Brown	Buffalo Bills	DT	
1984	1	16	16	Pete Koch	Cincinnati Bengals	DE	
1984	1	19	19	Ron Solt	Indianapolis Colts	G	Pro Bowl (1987)
1984	2	10	38	Boomer Esiason	Cincinnati Bengals	QB	1988 NFL MVP; 4× Pro Bowl (1986, 1988, 1989, 1993); All-Pro (1988); Man of the Year Award
1984	4	22	106	Dave D'Addio	Detroit Lions	RB	
1984	7	2	170	Willie Joyner	Houston Oilers	RB	
1984	12	15	323	Russell Davis	Buffalo Bills	WR	
1985	2	6	34	Kevin Glover	Detroit Lions	C	3× Pro Bowl (1995–1997); 4× All-Pro (1994–1997)
1985	3	1	57	Frank Reich	Buffalo Bills	QB	
1985	7	3	171	Eric Wilson	Green Bay Packers	LB	
1986	5	2	112	J. D. Maarleveld	Tampa Bay Buccaneers	T	
1986	5	19	129	Donald Brown	San Diego Chargers	DB	
1986	6	12	150	Stan Gelbaugh	Dallas Cowboys	QB	
1986	7	20	186	Rick Badanjek	Washington Redskins	RB	
1986	9	27	248	George Colton	New England Patriots	G	
1986	11	18	295	Len Lynch	New York Giants	G	
1987	8	14	209	Bruce Mesner	Buffalo Bills	DE	
1987	9	12	235	Alvin Blount	Dallas Cowboys	RB	
1987	10	28	279	Chuck Faucette	New York Giants	LB	
1987	11	27	306	Tommy Neal	Denver Broncos	RB	
1988	3	2	57	Kevin Walker	Cincinnati Bengals	LB	
1988	3	18	73	Ferrell Edmunds	Miami Dolphins	TE	2× Pro Bowl (1989, 1990); All-Pro (1989)
1988	9	3	224	Azizuddin Abdur-Ra'oof	Kansas City Chiefs	WR	
1988	10	21	270	O'Brien Alston	Indianapolis Colts	LB	
1988	11	1	278	James Milling	Atlanta Falcons	WR	
1989	2	19	47	Warren Powers	Denver Broncos	DE	
1989	5	4	116	Vernon Joines	Cleveland Browns	WR	
1989	11	22	301	Dan Plocki	Cleveland Browns	K	
1989	12	8	315	J. B. Brown	Miami Dolphins	DB	
1990	3	17	70	Neil O'Donnell	Pittsburgh Steelers	QB	Pro Bowl (1992)
1990	12	18	322	Blaine Rose	New England Patriots	G	
1991	4	1	84	Scott Zolak	New England Patriots	QB	
1991	4	28	111	Clarence Jones	New York Giants	T	
1991	9	1	224	O'Neil Glenn	New England Patriots	G	
1992	3	14	70	Larry Webster	Miami Dolphins	DT	Super Bowl XXXV Champion
1992	7	1	169	Derek Steele	Indianapolis Colts	DE	
1993	6	20	160	Frank Wycheck	Tennessee Titans	TE	3× Pro Bowl (1998–2000); All-Pro (2000)
1995	7	7	215	Steve Ingram	Tampa Bay Buccaneers	G	
1996	5	21	153	Jermaine Lewis	Baltimore Ravens	WR	2× Pro Bowl (1998, 2001); 2× All-Pro (1998, 2001); Super Bowl XXXV Champion
1997	1	24	24	Chad Scott	Pittsburgh Steelers	DB	
1998	6	10	163	Eric Ogbogu	New York Jets	DE	
1999	5	13	146	Eric Barton	Oakland Raiders	LB	
1999	6	18	187	Kendall Ogle	Cleveland Browns	LB	
2000	4	1	95	Lewis Sanders	Cleveland Browns	DB	
2000	7	10	216	Delbert Cowsette	Washington Redskins	DT	
2001	2	13	44	Kris Jenkins	Carolina Panthers	DT	4× Pro Bowl (2002, 2003, 2006, 2008); 3× All-Pro (2002, 2003, 2008)
2001	2	18	49	Lamont Jordan	New York Jets	RB	
2002	3	11	76	Melvin Fowler	Cleveland Browns	C	
2002	3	17	83	Charles Hill	Houston Texans	DT	
2002	7	41	252	Matt Murphy	Detroit Lions	TE	
2003	2	8	40	E. J. Henderson	Minnesota Vikings	LB	Pro Bowl (2010); College Football Hall of Fame
2004	2	24	56	Madieu Williams	Cincinnati Bengals	DB	Man of the Year Award
2004	3	8	71	Randy Starks	Tennessee Titans	DT	2× Pro Bowl (2010, 2012)
2004	4	16	112	Leon Joe	Chicago Bears	LB	
2004	7	19	220	Jeff Dugan	Minnesota Vikings	TE	
2004	7	41	242	Bruce Perry	Philadelphia Eagles	RB	
2005	1	12	12	Shawne Merriman	San Diego Chargers	LB	3× Pro Bowl (2005–2007); 3× All-Pro (2005–2007); NFL DROY
2005	3	33	97	Domonique Foxworth	Denver Broncos	DB	
2006	1	6	6	Vernon Davis	San Francisco 49ers	TE	2× Pro Bowl (2009, 2013); All-Pro (2013); Super Bowl 50 Champion
2006	2	2	34	D'Qwell Jackson	Cleveland Browns	LB	Pro Bowl (2014)
2006	7	26	232	Gerrick McPhearson	New York Giants	DB	
2007	2	23	55	Josh Wilson	Seattle Seahawks	DB	
2007	4	2	101	Adam Podlesh	Jacksonville Jaguars	P	
2007s	5	0	0	Jared Gaither	Baltimore Ravens	T	
2008	4	16	115	Dre Moore	Tampa Bay Buccaneers	DT	
2009	1	7	7	Darrius Heyward-Bey	Oakland Raiders	WR	
2009	3	16	80	Kevin Barnes	Washington Redskins	DB	
2009	7	21	230	Moise Fokou	Philadelphia Eagles	LB	
2009	7	27	236	Jaimie Thomas	Indianapolis Colts	T	
2009	7	46	255	Dan Gronkowski	Detroit Lions	TE	
2010	4	8	106	Bruce Campbell	Oakland Raiders	T	
2010	5	14	145	Nolan Carroll	Miami Dolphins	DB	
2011	2	26	58	Torrey Smith	Baltimore Ravens	WR	Super Bowl XLVII, LII Champion
2011	7	18	221	Da'Rel Scott	New York Giants	RB	Super Bowl XLVI Champion
2013	7	18	224	Kevin Dorsey	Green Bay Packers	WR	
2014	3	16	80	Dexter McDougle	New York Jets	DB	
2015	5	10	146	Stefon Diggs	Minnesota Vikings	WR	4× Pro Bowl (2020–2023); 2× All-Pro (2020, 2022); All-Rookie Team (2015)
2015	6	27	203	Darius Kilgo	Denver Broncos	DT	Super Bowl 50, LI Champion
2016	2	27	58	Sean Davis	Pittsburgh Steelers	DB	
2016	3	6	69	Yannick Ngakoue	Jacksonville Jaguars	DE	Pro Bowl (2017); All-Rookie Team (2016)
2016	5	8	147	Quinton Jefferson	Seattle Seahawks	DT	
2018	1	24	24	D. J. Moore	Carolina Panthers	WR	All-Rookie Team (2018)
2018	5	24	161	Jermaine Carter	Carolina Panthers	LB	
2019	1	22	22	Darnell Savage	Green Bay Packers	DB	All-Rookie Team (2019)
2019	5	21	159	Byron Cowart	New England Patriots	DT	
2019	6	13	186	Ty Johnson	Detroit Lions	RB	
2019	7	5	219	Derwin Gray	Pittsburgh Steelers	G	
2020	4	18	124	Anthony McFarland Jr.	Pittsburgh Steelers	RB	
2020	6	19	198	Antoine Brooks	Pittsburgh Steelers	DB	Super Bowl LVI Champion
2021	7	5	233	Jake Funk	Los Angeles Rams	RB	Super Bowl LVI Champion
2022	3	32	96	Nick Cross	Indianapolis Colts	S	
2022	4	38	143	Chig Okonkwo	Tennessee Titans	TE	All-Rookie Team (2022)
2023	1	24	24	Deonte Banks	New York Giants	DB	
2023	4	2	104	Jakorian Bennett	Las Vegas Raiders	DB	
2023	4	10	112	Chad Ryland	New England Patriots	K	
2023	6	9	186	Jaelyn Duncan	Tennessee Titans	T	
2023	7	34	251	Spencer Anderson	Pittsburgh Steelers	G	
2024	3	13	77	Delmar Glaze	Las Vegas Raiders	T	
2024	5	2	137	Tarheeb Still	Los Angeles Chargers	DB	
2025	3	38	102	Tai Felton	Minnesota Vikings	WR	
2025	4	30	132	Ruben Hyppolite II	Chicago Bears	LB	
2025	5	5	143	Jordan Phillips	Miami Dolphins	DT	
2025	5	17	155	Dante Trader Jr.	Miami Dolphins	DB	
2025	7	24	240	Kaden Prather	Buffalo Bills	WR	
2025	7	31	247	Tommy Akingbesote	Dallas Cowboys	DT	
2026	3	36	100	Jalen Huskey	Jacksonville Jaguars	S	

== Notable undrafted players ==
Note: No drafts held before 1920

Debut year	Player name	Position	Debut NFL/AFL team	Notes
1959	Ben Scotti	CB	Washington Redskins	—
1960	Phil Perlo	LB	Houston Oilers	—
1966	King Corcoran	QB	Denver Broncos	—
1967	Chip Myrtle	LB	Denver Broncos	—
1968	Billy Van Heusen	P/WR	Denver Broncos	—
1970	Dan Kecman	LB	Boston Patriots	—
1971	Tony Greene	S	Buffalo Bills	—
1975	Don Ratliff	DE	Philadelphia Eagles	—
1976	John Schultz	WR	Denver Broncos	—
1977	Bob Raba	TE	New York Jets	—
1979	Neal Olkewicz	LB	Washington Redskins	—
1980	Kevin Wyatt	LB	New York Giants	—
1981	Mike Tice	TE	Seattle Seahawks	—
1981	Steve Trimble	DB	Denver Broncos	—
1982	Renaldo Nehemiah	WR	San Francisco 49ers	—
1982	Jeff Rodenberger	RB	Philadelphia Eagles	—
1984	Dave Pacella	C/G	Philadelphia Eagles	—
1985	Jess Atkinson	K	New York Giants	—
1987	Ted Chapman	DE	Los Angeles Raiders	—
1987	Ron Fazio	TE	Philadelphia Eagles	—
1987	Scott Schankweiler	LB	Buffalo Bills	—
1988	Sean Scott	LB	Dallas Cowboys	—
1989	Ben Jefferson	G	Indianapolis Colts	—
1990	Mike Kiselak	C/G	Kansas City Chiefs	—
1991	Barry Johnson	WR	Denver Broncos	—
1993	Darren Drozdov	NT	New York Jets	—
1996	Scott Milanovich	QB	Tampa Bay Buccaneers	—
1997	Ratcliff Thomas	LB	Carolina Panthers	—
1997	Al Wallace	DE	Jacksonville Jaguars	—
1998	Eric Hicks	DE	Kansas City Chiefs	—
1999	Clifton Crosby	CB	St. Louis Rams	—
2002	Shaun Hill	QB	Minnesota Vikings	—
2004	Scott McBrien	QB	Green Bay Packers	—
2005	Jon Condo	LS	Dallas Cowboys	—
2005	Nick Novak	K	Chicago Bears	—
2007	Sam Hollenbach	QB	Washington Redskins	—
2008	Lance Bell	RB	St. Louis Rams	—
2008	Joey Haynos	TE	Green Bay Packers	—
2008	Erin Henderson	LB	Minnesota Vikings	—
2012	Davin Meggett	RB	Houston Texans	—
2016	Brad Craddock	K	Cleveland Browns	—
2023	Rakim Jarrett	WR	Tampa Bay Buccaneers	—
2026	Jalil Farooq	WR	Baltimore Ravens	—
2026	Alan Herron	OT	New Orleans Saints	—
