= 1951 Maryland Terrapins football team =

American college football season

1951 Maryland Terrapins football
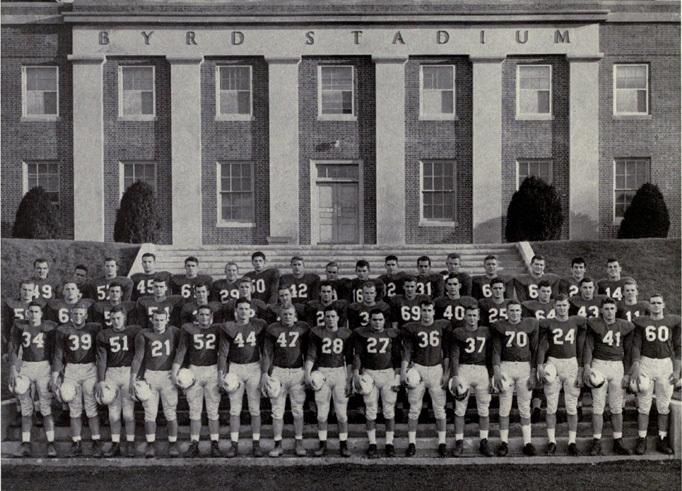
- Team photograph in front of Byrd Stadium

National champion (five selectors) SoCon co-champion Sugar Bowl champion

Sugar Bowl, W 28–13 vs. Tennessee
- Conference: Southern Conference

Ranking
- Coaches: No. 4
- AP: No. 3
- Record: 10–0 (5–0 SoCon)
- Head coach: Jim Tatum (5th season)
- Offensive scheme: Split-T
- Captains: Bob Ward; Dave Cianelli; John Alderton
- Home stadium: Byrd Stadium

1951 Southern Conference football standings
	Conf.					Overall
Team	W		L		T	W		L		T
No. 3 Maryland +	5	–	0	–	0	10	–	0	–	0
VMI +	5	–	0	–	0	7	–	3	–	0
Washington and Lee	5	–	1	–	0	6	–	4	–	0
William & Mary	5	–	1	–	0	7	–	3	–	0
No. 19 Clemson	3	–	1	–	0	7	–	3	–	0
Duke	4	–	2	–	0	5	–	4	–	1
South Carolina	5	–	3	–	0	6	–	4	–	0
Wake Forest	5	–	3	–	0	6	–	4	–	0
George Washington	2	–	3	–	1	2	–	6	–	1
North Carolina	2	–	3	–	0	2	–	8	–	0
West Virginia	2	–	3	–	0	5	–	5	–	0
NC State	2	–	6	–	0	3	–	7	–	0
Richmond	2	–	6	–	0	3	–	8	–	0
The Citadel	1	–	3	–	0	4	–	6	–	0
Furman	1	–	4	–	1	3	–	6	–	1
Davidson	1	–	5	–	0	1	–	8	–	0
VPI	1	–	7	–	0	2	–	8	–	0
+ – Conference co-champions; Rankings from AP Poll

The 1951 Maryland Terrapins football team represented the University of Maryland in 1951 college football season as a member of the Southern Conference (SoCon). Maryland outscored its opponents, 381–74, and finished the season with a 10–0 record, including three shut outs, and held seven opponents to seven points or less. It was the school's first perfect undefeated and untied season since 1893. Maryland also secured its first berth in a major postseason bowl game, the 1952 Sugar Bowl, where it upset first-ranked Tennessee under head coach Robert Neyland.

Maryland was led by fifth-year head coach Jim Tatum, whom Time magazine called "the most successful major college coach in the game" during his nine-year tenure at College Park. To date, Tatum remains the winningest Maryland football coach of the modern era, with a winning percentage of 0.819. The team returned experienced junior quarterback Jack Scarbath, who was the runner-up for the Heisman Trophy in the following season. Other key returning players included Ed Modzelewski, Ed Fullerton, Bob Ward, and Bob Shemonski.

The team was selected national champion by NCAA-designated major selectors of Dunkel, Football Research, National Championship Foundation, Sagarin, and Sagarin (ELO-Chess). (Note: Based on a statistical technique used by College Football Reference that uses unweighted victory margin and strength of schedule, this was the number one ranked team in school history dating back to games played in 1917. It was 22.74 points better than the average Division I team in 1951. Using this computational method, it was 3rd best overall college football team in 1951.)

== Before the season ==
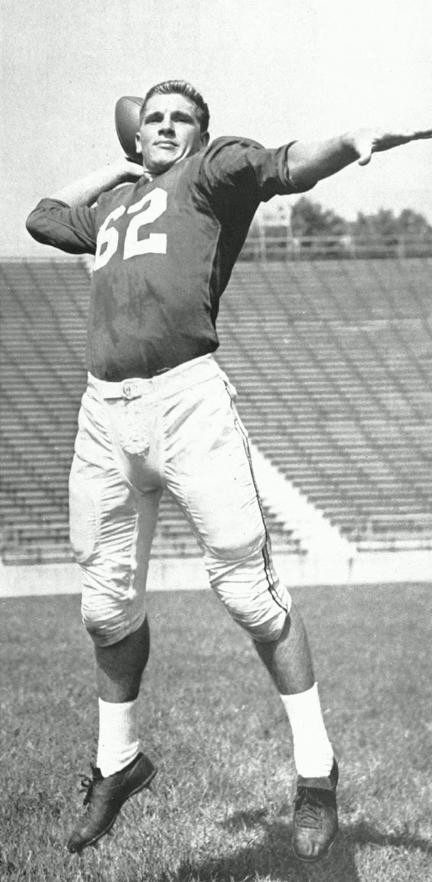
Quarterback Jack Scarbath led the team for most of the season

Maryland had ended the previous season on a two-game winning streak, which it extended through the duration of the 1951 season. The following year, the Terrapins continued that streak for seven additional games before a loss to 11th-ranked Mississippi. In total, Maryland won 22 straight games from 1950 to 1952, which remains the longest winning streak in program history. One Associated Press writer characterized the 1950 season's 7–2–1 record as a disappointment to "never-satisfied alumni" who had hoped for an undefeated season and first-ever Southern Conference championship.

Respected sports prognosticator Grantland Rice picked North Carolina under Carl Snavely as the frontrunner to win the Southern Conference championship and predicted they would finish as the 18th ranked team in the nation. Rice estimated Maryland would finish second in the league and 20th in the rankings. Robert Moore of the Associated Press named Maryland the favorite to win the Southern Conference championship and stated it was "undoubtedly ... the team to beat", although he acknowledged that at least eight other teams would also be in contention: North Carolina, Clemson, Duke, North Carolina State, South Carolina, VMI, Wake Forest, and William & Mary. Moore was more subdued in his assessments of George Washington, Richmond, Virginia Tech, Washington & Lee, and predicted rebuilding seasons for Davidson, Furman, The Citadel, and West Virginia.

The Associated Press later called Maryland's preseason favorite title a "dubious distinction", to which few teams in the Mid-Atlantic had been able to live up. Tatum expressed confidence and said it was "the best team I've ever coached," but acknowledged the team could lose as many as seven games in a worst-case scenario. Another Associated Press article said most people expected a big season from Maryland as the culmination of five years of Tatum's high-caliber recruiting. A United Press article had high confidence in Maryland, because of its experienced team and what it assessed as an easier schedule than previous seasons. It predicted Georgia, LSU, Navy, and North Carolina as the "only rough spots" on the schedule.

=== Personnel ===
Maryland lost several players, including fifteen lettermen, from the previous season due to the exhaustion of their college eligibility. These included ends Elmer Wingate and Pete Augsburger, tackles Chet Gierula and Ray Krouse, center Jack Rowden, and kicker Jack Targarona. Notably, Maryland did not lose a single back "worthy of mention", and all of the linemen aside from the ends had ready replacements.

On the whole, Maryland returned a seasoned team that included 22 lettermen, and the United Press described the team as "bigger and bruisier than ever." They were led by junior quarterback Jack Scarbath who gained significant experience in the split-T the previous season, in which he started the first six games before suffering an injury. He was backed up by a capable reservist in sophomore quarterback Bernie Faloney. (In 1952, Scarbath was the Heisman Trophy runner-up, and the following year, Faloney finished fourth in the voting.)

Scarbath was accompanied in the backfield by several other capable players, including "one of the biggest fullbacks in captivity" Ed Modzelewski and halfbacks Chet "the Jet" Hanulak and Ed Fullerton. Halfback Bob Shemonski, the previous season's conference-scoring leader, was shifted to play mostly on defense, but would rank as the team leader in kick returns with six for 126 yards. The Terrapins' line was anchored by co-captains Bob Ward, a guard, and Dave Cianelli, the center. At tackle, it featured Ed's brother, Dick Modzelewski, and Bob Morgan. The defense was described as particularly deep, anchored by Ward, Cianelli, and Jeff Keith, and with good reserves available into even the third string.

The position(s) for each player are annotated in parentheses (for an explanation of the abbreviations used see American football positions).

- John Alderton (DE)
- Ed Barritt
- Lynn Beightol (QB)
- Dick Bielski (FB)
- Walter Boeri (FB/G/LB)
- Dave Christianson (T)
- Dave Cianelli (C/FB/LB)
- Lloyd Colteryahn (OE)
- Tom Cosgrove (C)
- Marty Crytzer (C/E)
- Lynn Davis (DB)
- Don Decker (K)
- Bob DeStefano (QB)
- Bernie Faloney (QB/P)
- Ralph Felton (FB/DB/LB)
- Ed Fincke (C)
- Hank Fox (E)
- Chick Fry (T)
- Ed Fullerton (HB/DB)
- John Guender
- Chet Hanulak (HB)
- Fred Heffner (E/K/P)
- Joe Horning (HB/DB)
- Art Hurd (G)
- Stan Jones (T)
- Ed Kensler (DG)
- Jeff Keith (C/LB)
- Charles Lattimer (C)
- Bob Laughery (B)
- Pete Ladygo (OG/LB)
- Paul Lindsay (E)
- Leonard Mahoney
- Bill Maletzky (G)
- Roy Martine
- Dick Modzelewski (T)
- Ed Modzelewski (FB)
- Bob Morgan (T)
- Joe Moss (OT)
- Frank Navarro (G)
- Paul Nestor (DE)
- Dick Nolan (DB)
- Joe Petruzzo (HB/DB)
- Jack Scarbath (QB)
- Karney Scioscia (FB)
- Bob Shemonski (E/HB/DB)
- Ray Stankus (G)
- Dan Staffieri
- Clifford Trexler (C)
- Bob Ward (G)
- George Weicker (T)
- Lou Weidensaul (E)

==== Coaching staff ====
Jim Tatum served as the head coach for his fifth year at Maryland in the 1951 season. All told, he served a nine-year tenure at College Park and compiled a 73–15–4 record for a winning percentage of 0.819, the highest among Maryland coaches in the modern era. Tatum later gained national recognition, with Time magazine later calling him "the most successful major college coach in the game", and 1951 proved to be his breakout season. Tatum employed the split-T, which he had learned firsthand as the protégé of its pioneer, Don Faurot. This new offensive system sought to emulate the "two-on-one" fast break of basketball, with the aim of creating an undefended back.

Name	Position	Year	Alma mater
Jim Tatum	Head coach	5th	North Carolina (1935)
Tommy Mont	Backfield coach	1st	Maryland (1947)
Warren Giese	Ends coach	3rd	Oklahoma (1947)
Jack Hennemier	Line coach	4th	Duke
Duke Wyre	Head trainer		

== Schedule ==
Date	Opponent	Rank	Site	Result	Attendance	Source
September 29	at Washington and Lee	No. 16	Wilson Field; Lexington, VA	W 54–14	9,000	
October 6	George Washington	No. 9	Byrd Stadium; College Park, MD	W 33–6	25,732	
October 13	at Georgia*	No. 10	Sanford Stadium; Athens, GA	W 43–7	30,000	
October 20	North Carolina	No. 7	Byrd Stadium; College Park, MD	W 14–7	31,237	
October 27	at LSU*	No. 5	Tiger Stadium; Baton Rouge, LA	W 27–0	38,000	
November 3	Missouri*^{†}	No. 4	Byrd Stadium; College Park, MD	W 35–0	23,612	
November 10	vs. Navy*	No. 3	Municipal Stadium; Baltimore, MD (rivalry)	W 40–21	38,000	
November 17	NC State	No. 5	Byrd Stadium; College Park, MD	W 53–0	17,140	
November 24	West Virginia	No. 4	Byrd Stadium; College Park, MD (rivalry)	W 54–7	14,385	
January 3	vs. No. 1 Tennessee*	No. 3	Tulane Stadium; New Orleans, LA (Sugar Bowl)	W 28–13	82,271	
*Non-conference game; ^{†}Homecoming; Rankings from AP Poll released prior to the game

== Game summaries ==
=== Washington & Lee ===
	1	2	3	4	Total
Maryland	14	13	7	20	54
Washington & Lee	0	7	0	7	14

The season opened against Washington & Lee, the defending 1950 Southern Conference champions. In the first quarter, the Generals' fumbled in their own end zone, which was converted into a Maryland touchdown when Pete Ladygo recovered it. Tatum used his alternates generously: fifty Terrapin players saw action in the game and nine scored. Quarterbacks Jack Scarbath, Bob DeStefano, Bernie Faloney, and Lynn Beightol all saw action.

=== George Washington ===
	1	2	3	4	Total
George Washington	0	0	0	6	6
Maryland	14	13	6	0	33

To open the game against George Washington, Scarbath led a five-play drive that culminated in a one-yard rush by Ed Modzelewski for a score. Don Decker made the extra point. Later, Ed Modzelewski scored again on a 62-yard touchdown break. In the second quarter, back-up quarterback Faloney scored on a quarterback keeper. Then, Ralph Felton connected with Ed Fullerton with a 27-yard pass for another touchdown to close the half, 27–0. In the third quarter, Scarbath threw a pass to Felton for the final Maryland score. In the fourth quarter, G.W.'s Bino Varreira scored in the last minute of play, for a final result of 33–6.

=== Georgia ===
	1	2	3	4	Total
Maryland	10	7	19	7	43
Georgia	0	7	0	0	7

The year prior, Georgia had soundly beaten an unprepared and unconditioned Maryland team in the season-opener. In 1951, the Bulldogs were supposed to be one of the Terrapins' toughest tests. Maryland tallied first with a field goal by Don Decker, which was an unusual method to score at the time. Later in the first quarter, Chet Hanulak rushed for a touchdown. In the second quarter, Hanulak scored again. Georgia's only score of the game came on a four-yard rush by Lauren Hargrove. Halftime expired with a score of 17–7. In the third quarter, Ed Modzelewski, Ralph Felton, and Scarbath each scored. Fullerton scored the final touchdown on a then school-record 86-yard run.

=== North Carolina ===
	1	2	3	4	Total
North Carolina	7	0	0	0	7
Maryland	7	7	0	0	14

In the first quarter, Maryland engineered a 79-yard drive. Ralph Felton gained the last 27 yards for the score. North Carolina responded with a 41-yard drive capped by a touchdown by Bob Gantt. In the second quarter, Bob Shemonski broke the stalemate with a touchdown pass to Lou Weidensaul for the go-ahead. In the final minutes of the fourth quarter, Maryland's Joe Petruzzo broke up a pass in the end zone to preserve the victory, 14–7.

It was the 18th game of the series and the first Maryland win in eleven meetings. The previous one had been in 1926.

=== Louisiana State ===
	1	2	3	4	Total
Maryland	0	13	7	7	27
LSU	0	0	0	0	0

Maryland then traveled to Baton Rouge to face Southeastern Conference powerhouse Louisiana State. A tough LSU defense held Maryland scoreless through the first and most of the second quarter. Late in the first half, LSU's Jim Barton and Bernie Faloney exchanged several punts, until Maryland gained good field position on the Tigers' 43-yard line. Ed Modzelewski helped lead a five-play drive capped by a quarterback sneak by Scarbath for the first score of the game. On the next Maryland possession, Scarbath dodged several LSU tacklers and ran for a 56-yard touchdown. At halftime, the Terrapins led, 13–0. In the third quarter, Maryland executed a sweep and double reverse, which allowed Bob Shemonski to rush for a touchdown. In the fourth quarter, Ed Modzelewski tossed the ball to Chet Hanulak for the final score of the game. Maryland won, 27–0.

=== Missouri ===
	1	2	3	4	Total
Missouri	0	0	0	0	0
Maryland	7	7	14	7	35

Missouri was led by head coach Don Faurot, inventor of the split-T offense and former mentor of Jim Tatum. The Terrapin defense shut-down the Tigers' spread offense and held it to seven completions on 28 attempts. Joe Horning intercepted a Tiger pass and returned it 100 yards for a score. All told, Maryland compiled 350 rushing yards and zero passing yards on three incomplete pass attempts. Missouri recorded 103 passing yards and 92 rushing yards.

=== Navy ===
	1	2	3	4	Total
Maryland	7	7	20	6	40
Navy	7	0	0	14	21

Early in the first quarter, Navy's Frank Brady returned a punt 100 yards for a touchdown and gave the Mids a 7-0 lead, marking the only time during the entire 1951 season that Maryland trailed an opponent in a game. Scarbath connected with receivers on 16 of 34 pass attempts for 285 passing yards and two interceptions. Ed Modzelewski and Paul Weidensaul each scored touchdowns.

=== NC State ===
	1	2	3	4	Total
NC State	0	0	0	0	0
Maryland	14	19	6	14	53

At College Park, Maryland sought revenge against NC State for ending their bowl game opportunity the previous year. Ralph Felton ran for 186 yards and a touchdown. Ed Kensler returned an interception for a score. Ed Modzelewski rushed for a total of 89 yards. Don Decker kicked five extra points.

Shortly before the game, Maryland accepted an invitation to play in the Sugar Bowl.

=== West Virginia ===
	1	2	3	4	Total
West Virginia	0	7	0	0	7
Maryland	21	14	6	13	54

In the first quarter, Ed Modzelewski rushed 16 yards for the opening touchdown. Maryland scored three more touchdowns on each of its subsequent possessions. Lloyd Colteryahn caught a ten-yard pass from Scarbath for the fifth and final Terrapins' touchdown of the first half. In the second, Maryland scored 19 unanswered points, which culminated in a 77-yard run by Joe Horning.

=== Tennessee (Sugar Bowl) ===
	1	2	3	4	Total
Maryland	7	14	7	0	28
Tennessee	0	6	0	7	13

The Washington Post called the 1952 Sugar Bowl the second "game of the century," with the first having been between the undefeated Army and Notre Dame teams in 1946. The Associated Press called it possibly "the greatest bowl game of them all." Tennessee was a period powerhouse and its roster included five All-Americans. Maryland was viewed as a heavy underdog going into the game. Terrapins halfback Chet Hanulak said, "Nobody expected us to get that far. But Jim Tatum was a coach who could work wonders." After mechanical issues delayed Maryland's flight, the team became the first to practice at night for a Sugar Bowl. Tatum said, "[Tennessee is] so much better than we are that they probably don't need the practice. But we do—and we'll get it."

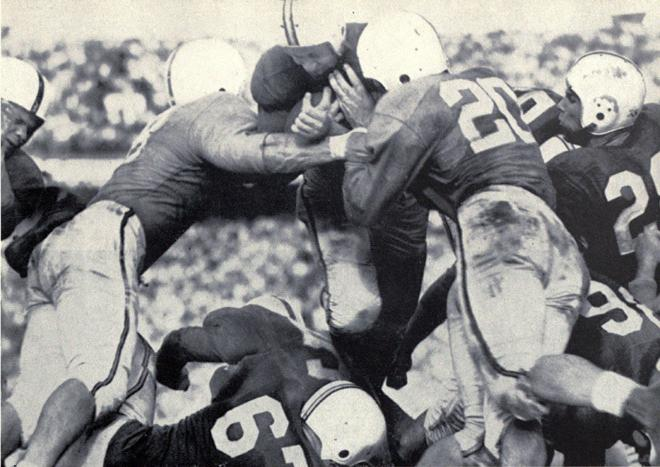
Scarbath tallied the first points of the game on a successful quarterback sneak.

Tennessee was led by triple-threat quarterback and Heisman runner-up Hank Lauricella. Head coach Neyland's offensive linemen were described as not large but "squatty" and "bruiser[s], not flashy, but slightly murderous." Neyland considered the split-T offense used by Tatum gimmicky and relied on the more traditional single-wing formation. He subscribed to the adage that, when the ball was thrown, "three things could happen, and two of them were bad." For the game, Tatum himself abandoned the split-T in favor of a smashmouth approach to run it up the middle, where he thought "they least expected [it]." Neyland's strategy focused heavily on punting the ball to pin the opponent in their own territory with a goal of creating turnovers, and Tatum likewise adopted it.

The game started with both teams exchanging several punts in the first quarter. Maryland gained good field position after Lauricella kicked a short punt. Running backs Ed Modzelewski and Ed Fullerton then led an 11-play, 56-yard rushing drive for a touchdown. On the kickoff, Bob Ward hit Lauricella and forced a fumble that Maryland recovered on Tennessee's 13-yard line. After four plays, Jack Scarbath pitched to Fullerton who then threw a six-yard forward pass to Bob Shemonski in the end zone and expanded the Maryland lead to 14–0. Scarbath then engineered a 48-yard drive and ran it in himself for the Terrapins' third touchdown within seven minutes. Late in the second quarter, Tennessee back Bert Rechichar caught a four-yard pass for a touchdown, but the extra point was no good. At the end of the first half, Maryland had stunned Tennessee by gaining a 21–6 lead. In the third quarter, Fullerton intercepted a pass and returned it 46 yards for a touchdown. In the final minutes, Tennessee's goal-line quarterback Herky Payne ran it in from the one-yard line. Maryland won the game with a final result of 28–13.

== After the season ==
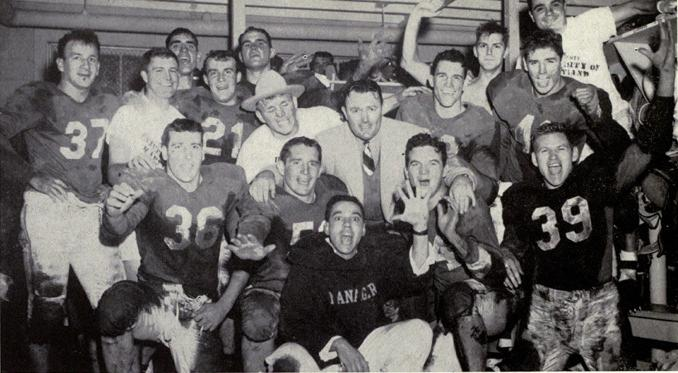
The team celebrates after its Sugar Bowl victory.

Maryland finished as the nation's only untied, undefeated team that had played a ten-game schedule. The final wire service rankings, however, were released prior to the bowl games at the time. Therefore, Maryland held a final ranking as the number-three team in the nation, behind first-ranked Tennessee (10–1) and second-ranked Michigan State (9–0). To date, the 1951 Terrapins remain Maryland's only undefeated, untied team of the modern era.

Several championship selectors have named Maryland the 1951 national champions. These include the following NCAA-recognized sources: Jeff Sagarin's computer ranking system, the College Football Researchers Association, the DeVold System, the Dunkel System, and the National Championship Foundation. In 2002, The Washington Post called the 1951 season the greatest in Maryland football history, ranking it above the 1953 national championship team. The season saw Maryland compile its first (and, to date, only) undefeated, untied season since 1893.

=== Awards ===
Bob Ward was named a consensus first-team All-American and Dick Modzelewski and Ed Modzelewski were named second-team All-Americans. Dave Cianelli, Tom Cosgrove, Joe Petruzzo, and Jack Scarbath were named honorable mention All-Americans. Jim Tatum was named the Southern Conference Coach of the Year. Bob Ward received the Knute Rockne Award and was named the Southern Conference Player of the Year. Ward and Ed Modzelewski were named All-Southern Conference.

== See also ==
- Maryland Terrapins football under Jim Tatum (1947–1955)
