= 1954 All-Atlantic Coast Conference football team =

American college football all-star team

The 1954 All-Atlantic Coast Conference football team consists of American football players chosen by the Associated Press (AP) and the United Press (UP) as the best players at each position from the players on teams participating in the Atlantic Coast Conference ("ACC") during the 1954 college football season.

The 1954 Duke Blue Devils football team won the ACC championship and defeated Nebraska in the 1955 Orange Bowl. Duke placed three players on the All-ACC team: quarterback Jerry Barger; halfback Bob Pascal; and tackle Fred Campbell.

The 1954 Maryland Terrapins football team finished in second place and was ranked No. 8 in the final AP poll. The Terrapins also placed three players on the All-ACC team: halfback Ronnie Waller; fullback Dick Bielski; and end Bill Walker.

Bob Bartholomew of Wake Forest was the only unanimous selection by all 43 AP voters.

== All-Atlantic Coast selections ==
=== Ends ===
- Ed Stowers, Wake Forest (AP-1; UP-1)
- Bill Walker, Maryland (AP-1)
- Scott Jackson, Clemson (UP-1; AP-2)
- Will Frye, North Carolina (AP-2)

=== Tackles ===
- Bob Bartholomew, Wake Forest (AP-1, UP-1)
- Roland Perdue, North Carolina (AP-1)
- Fred Campbell, Duke (UP-1)
- Harry Lovell, South Carolina (AP-2)
- Jack Maultsby, North Carolina (AP-2)

=== Guards ===
- Frank Mincevich, South Carolina (AP-1; UP-1)
- John Polzer, Virginia (AP-1; UP-1)
- John Bowersox, Maryland (AP-2)
- Bob Pellegrini, Maryland (AP-2)

=== Centers ===
- Leon Cunningham, South Carolina (AP-1; UP-1)
- John Irvine, Maryland (AP-2)

=== Backs ===
- Jerry Barger, Duke (AP-1 [QB]; UP-1)
- Ronnie Waller, Maryland (AP-1 [HB]; UP-1 [HB])
- Dick Bielski, Maryland (AP-1 [FB]; UP-1 [FB])
- Robert A. Pascal, Duke (AP-1 [HB])
- George Marinkov, NC State (UP-1 [HB]; AP-2)
- Mackie Prickett, South Carolina (AP-2)
- Carl Brazell, South Carolina (AP-2)
- Bryant Aldridge, Duke (AP-2)

== Key ==
AP = Associated Press
UP = United Press

== See also ==
- 1954 College Football All-America Team
