= 1951 NC State Wolfpack football team =

American college football season

1951 NC State Wolfpack football
- Conference: Southern Conference
- Record: 3–7 (2–6 SoCon)
- Head coach: Beattie Feathers (8th season)
- Home stadium: Riddick Stadium

1951 Southern Conference football standings
	Conf.					Overall
Team	W		L		T	W		L		T
No. 3 Maryland +	5	–	0	–	0	10	–	0	–	0
VMI +	5	–	0	–	0	7	–	3	–	0
Washington and Lee	5	–	1	–	0	6	–	4	–	0
William & Mary	5	–	1	–	0	7	–	3	–	0
No. 19 Clemson	3	–	1	–	0	7	–	3	–	0
Duke	4	–	2	–	0	5	–	4	–	1
South Carolina	5	–	3	–	0	6	–	4	–	0
Wake Forest	5	–	3	–	0	6	–	4	–	0
George Washington	2	–	3	–	1	2	–	6	–	1
North Carolina	2	–	3	–	0	2	–	8	–	0
West Virginia	2	–	3	–	0	5	–	5	–	0
NC State	2	–	6	–	0	3	–	7	–	0
Richmond	2	–	6	–	0	3	–	8	–	0
The Citadel	1	–	3	–	0	4	–	6	–	0
Furman	1	–	4	–	1	3	–	6	–	1
Davidson	1	–	5	–	0	1	–	8	–	0
VPI	1	–	7	–	0	2	–	8	–	0
+ – Conference co-champions; Rankings from AP Poll

The 1951 NC State Wolfpack football team represented North Carolina State University during the 1951 college football season. The Wolfpack were led by eighth-year head coach Beattie Feathers and played their home games at Riddick Stadium in Raleigh, North Carolina. They competed as members of the Southern Conference, finishing with a conference record of 2–6, and a 3–7 record overall. Feathers was fired as head coach at the conclusion of the season. He had a record of 37–38–3 at NC State.

== Schedule ==
Date	Opponent	Site	Result	Attendance	Source
September 15	Catawba*	Riddick Stadium; Raleigh, NC	W 34–0	7,000	
September 22	at North Carolina	Kenan Memorial Stadium; Chapel Hill, NC (rivalry)	L 0–21	43,000	
September 29	Wake Forest	Riddick Stadium; Raleigh, NC (rivalry)	L 6–21	22,300	
October 6	No. 18 Clemson	Riddick Stadium; Raleigh, NC (rivalry)	L 0–6	20,000	
October 13	at Duke	Duke Stadium; Durham, NC (rivalry)	L 21–27	23,000	
October 20	William & Mary	Riddick Stadium; Raleigh, NC	L 28–35	7,000	
October 27	at VPI	Miles Stadium; Blacksburg, VA	W 19–14	10,000	
November 2	at Louisville*	duPont Manual Stadium; Louisville, KY	L 2–26	1,000	
November 10	vs. Davidson	American Legion Memorial Stadium; Charlotte, NC	W 31–0	7,000	
November 17	at No. 5 Maryland	Byrd Stadium; College Park, MD	L 0–53	17,140	
*Non-conference game; Rankings from AP Poll released prior to the game
