= 1951 South Carolina Gamecocks football team =

American college football season

1951 South Carolina Gamecocks football
- Conference: Southern Conference
- Record: 5–4 (5–3 SoCon)
- Head coach: Rex Enright (11th season)
- Captain: Steve Wadiak
- Home stadium: Carolina Stadium

1951 Southern Conference football standings
	Conf.					Overall
Team	W		L		T	W		L		T
No. 3 Maryland +	5	–	0	–	0	10	–	0	–	0
VMI +	5	–	0	–	0	7	–	3	–	0
Washington and Lee	5	–	1	–	0	6	–	4	–	0
William & Mary	5	–	1	–	0	7	–	3	–	0
No. 19 Clemson	3	–	1	–	0	7	–	3	–	0
Duke	4	–	2	–	0	5	–	4	–	1
South Carolina	5	–	3	–	0	6	–	4	–	0
Wake Forest	5	–	3	–	0	6	–	4	–	0
George Washington	2	–	3	–	1	2	–	6	–	1
North Carolina	2	–	3	–	0	2	–	8	–	0
West Virginia	2	–	3	–	0	5	–	5	–	0
NC State	2	–	6	–	0	3	–	7	–	0
Richmond	2	–	6	–	0	3	–	8	–	0
The Citadel	1	–	3	–	0	4	–	6	–	0
Furman	1	–	4	–	1	3	–	6	–	1
Davidson	1	–	5	–	0	1	–	8	–	0
VPI	1	–	7	–	0	2	–	8	–	0
+ – Conference co-champions; Rankings from AP Poll

The 1951 South Carolina Gamecocks football team was an American football team that represented the University of South Carolina as a member of the Southern Conference (SoCon) during the 1951 college football season. In their 11th season under head coach Rex Enright, the Gamecocks compiled an overall record of 5–4 with a mark of 5–3 in conference play, tying for seventh place in the SoCon. The team was ranked at No. 68 in the 1951 Litkenhous Ratings.

== Schedule ==
Date	Opponent	Site	Result	Attendance	Source
September 22	Duke	Carolina Stadium; Columbia, SC	L 6–34	28,000	
September 29	The Citadel	Carolina Stadium; Columbia, SC	W 26–7	22,000	
October 6	Furman	Carolina Stadium; Columbia, SC	W 21–6	12,000	
October 13	at North Carolina	Kenan Memorial Stadium; Chapel Hill, NC (rivalry)	L 6–21	30,000–34,000	
October 25	Clemson	Carolina Stadium; Columbia, SC (rivalry)	W 20–0	35,000	
November 3	George Washington	Carolina Stadium; Columbia, SC	L 14–20		
November 10	at West Virginia	Mountaineer Field; Morgantown, WV	W 34–13	18,000	
November 17	at Virginia*	Scott Stadium; Charlottesville, VA	L 27–28	10,000	
November 24	Wake Forest	Carolina Stadium; Columbia, SC	W 21–6	18,000	
*Non-conference game
