= 1951 North Carolina Tar Heels football team =

American college football season

1951 North Carolina Tar Heels football
- Conference: Southern Conference
- Record: 2–8 (2–3 SoCon)
- Head coach: Carl Snavely (9th season)
- Captains: Joe Dudeck; Bob Gantt
- Home stadium: Kenan Memorial Stadium

1951 Southern Conference football standings
	Conf.					Overall
Team	W		L		T	W		L		T
No. 3 Maryland +	5	–	0	–	0	10	–	0	–	0
VMI +	5	–	0	–	0	7	–	3	–	0
Washington and Lee	5	–	1	–	0	6	–	4	–	0
William & Mary	5	–	1	–	0	7	–	3	–	0
No. 19 Clemson	3	–	1	–	0	7	–	3	–	0
Duke	4	–	2	–	0	5	–	4	–	1
South Carolina	5	–	3	–	0	6	–	4	–	0
Wake Forest	5	–	3	–	0	6	–	4	–	0
George Washington	2	–	3	–	1	2	–	6	–	1
North Carolina	2	–	3	–	0	2	–	8	–	0
West Virginia	2	–	3	–	0	5	–	5	–	0
NC State	2	–	6	–	0	3	–	7	–	0
Richmond	2	–	6	–	0	3	–	8	–	0
The Citadel	1	–	3	–	0	4	–	6	–	0
Furman	1	–	4	–	1	3	–	6	–	1
Davidson	1	–	5	–	0	1	–	8	–	0
VPI	1	–	7	–	0	2	–	8	–	0
+ – Conference co-champions; Rankings from AP Poll

The 1951 North Carolina Tar Heels football team represented the University of North Carolina at Chapel Hill during the 1951 college football season. The Tar Heels were led by ninth-year head coach Carl Snavely, and played their home games at Kenan Memorial Stadium. The team competed as a member of the Southern Conference. The team was ranked at No. 67 in the 1951 Litkenhous Ratings.

== Schedule ==
Date	Time	Opponent	Site	TV	Result	Attendance	Source
September 22	2:30 p.m.	NC State	Kenan Memorial Stadium; Chapel Hill, NC (rivalry)		W 21–0	43,000	
September 29	2:00 p.m.	Georgia*	Kenan Memorial Stadium; Chapel Hill, NC		L 16–28	36,000–41,000	
October 6	2:00 p.m.	at No. 6 Texas*	Texas Memorial Stadium; Austin, TX		L 20–45	32,000	
October 13	2:00 p.m.	South Carolina	Kenan Memorial Stadium; Chapel Hill, NC (rivalry)		W 21–6	30,000–34,000	
October 20	2:00 p.m.	at No. 7 Maryland	Byrd Stadium; College Park, MD	CBS	L 7–14	31,000	
October 27	2:00 p.m.	at Wake Forest	Groves Stadium; Wake Forest, NC (rivalry)		L 7–39	24,000	
November 3	2:00 p.m.	No. 1 Tennessee*	Kenan Memorial Stadium; Chapel Hill, NC		L 0–27	41,000	
November 10	2:00 p.m.	at Virginia*	Scott Stadium; Charlottesville, VA (South's Oldest Rivalry)		L 14–34	25,000	
November 17	2:00 p.m.	Notre Dame*	Kenan Memorial Stadium; Chapel Hill, NC (rivalry)		L 7–12	44,000–45,500	
November 24	2:00 p.m.	at Duke	Duke Stadium; Durham, NC (Victory Bell)		L 7–19	41,300–50,000	
*Non-conference game; Rankings from AP Poll released prior to the game; All times are in Eastern time
