= 1951 West Virginia Mountaineers football team =

American college football season

1951 West Virginia Mountaineers football
- Conference: Southern Conference
- Record: 5–5 (2–3 SoCon)
- Head coach: Art Lewis (2nd season)
- Captains: James Danter; Kereazis Konstantinos
- Home stadium: Mountaineer Field

1951 Southern Conference football standings
	Conf.					Overall
Team	W		L		T	W		L		T
No. 3 Maryland +	5	–	0	–	0	10	–	0	–	0
VMI +	5	–	0	–	0	7	–	3	–	0
Washington and Lee	5	–	1	–	0	6	–	4	–	0
William & Mary	5	–	1	–	0	7	–	3	–	0
No. 19 Clemson	3	–	1	–	0	7	–	3	–	0
Duke	4	–	2	–	0	5	–	4	–	1
South Carolina	5	–	3	–	0	6	–	4	–	0
Wake Forest	5	–	3	–	0	6	–	4	–	0
George Washington	2	–	3	–	1	2	–	6	–	1
North Carolina	2	–	3	–	0	2	–	8	–	0
West Virginia	2	–	3	–	0	5	–	5	–	0
NC State	2	–	6	–	0	3	–	7	–	0
Richmond	2	–	6	–	0	3	–	8	–	0
The Citadel	1	–	3	–	0	4	–	6	–	0
Furman	1	–	4	–	1	3	–	6	–	1
Davidson	1	–	5	–	0	1	–	8	–	0
VPI	1	–	7	–	0	2	–	8	–	0
+ – Conference co-champions; Rankings from AP Poll

The 1951 West Virginia Mountaineers football team was an American football team that represented West Virginia University in the Southern Conference (SoCon) during the 1951 college football season. In its second season under head coach Art Lewis, the team compiled a 5–5 record (2–3 against SoCon opponents), tied for 10th place in the conference, and outscored opponents by a total of 225 to 190. The team played its home games at Mountaineer Field in Morgantown, West Virginia. James Danter and Kereazis Konstantinos were the team captains.

== Schedule ==
Date	Opponent	Site	Result	Attendance	Source
September 22	Waynesburg*	Mountaineer Field; Morgantown, WV	W 20–9		
September 28	at Furman	Sirrine Stadium; Greenville, SC	W 18–7	6,500	
October 6	Washington and Lee	Mountaineer Field; Morgantown, WV	L 0–34	16,000	
October 13	Richmond	Mountaineer Field; Morgantown, WV	W 24–0		
October 20	Geneva*	Mountaineer Field; Morgantown, WV	W 89–0	6,000	
October 27	at Penn State*	New Beaver Field; State College, PA (rivalry)	L 7–13	16,200–17,206	
November 3	Western Reserve*	Mountaineer Field; Morgantown, WV	W 35–7	5,000	
November 10	South Carolina^{†}	Mountaineer Field; Morgantown, WV	L 13–34	18,000	
November 17	at Pittsburgh*	Pitt Stadium; Pittsburgh, PA (rivalry)	L 12–32	9,864	
November 24	at No. 4 Maryland	Byrd Stadium; College Park, MD (rivalry)	L 7–54	14,385	
*Non-conference game; ^{†}Homecoming; Rankings from AP Poll released prior to the game
