= 1951 Furman Purple Hurricane football team =

American college football season

1951 Furman Purple Hurricane football
- Conference: Southern Conference
- Record: 3–6–1 (1–4–1 SoCon)
- Head coach: Bill Young (2nd season)
- Captain: Sonny Horton
- Home stadium: Sirrine Stadium

1951 Southern Conference football standings
	Conf.					Overall
Team	W		L		T	W		L		T
No. 3 Maryland +	5	–	0	–	0	10	–	0	–	0
VMI +	5	–	0	–	0	7	–	3	–	0
Washington and Lee	5	–	1	–	0	6	–	4	–	0
William & Mary	5	–	1	–	0	7	–	3	–	0
No. 19 Clemson	3	–	1	–	0	7	–	3	–	0
Duke	4	–	2	–	0	5	–	4	–	1
South Carolina	5	–	3	–	0	6	–	4	–	0
Wake Forest	5	–	3	–	0	6	–	4	–	0
George Washington	2	–	3	–	1	2	–	6	–	1
North Carolina	2	–	3	–	0	2	–	8	–	0
West Virginia	2	–	3	–	0	5	–	5	–	0
NC State	2	–	6	–	0	3	–	7	–	0
Richmond	2	–	6	–	0	3	–	8	–	0
The Citadel	1	–	3	–	0	4	–	6	–	0
Furman	1	–	4	–	1	3	–	6	–	1
Davidson	1	–	5	–	0	1	–	8	–	0
VPI	1	–	7	–	0	2	–	8	–	0
+ – Conference co-champions; Rankings from AP Poll

The 1951 Furman Purple Hurricane football team was an American football team that represented Furman University as a member of the Southern Conference (SoCon) during the 1951 college football season. Led by second-year head coach Bill Young, the Purple Hurricane compiled an overall record of 3–6–1 with a mark of 1–4–1 in conference play, placing 15th in the SoCon.

== Schedule ==
Date	Opponent	Site	Result	Attendance	Source
September 14	Presbyterian*	Sirrine Stadium; Greenville, SC	W 39–0	10,000	
September 21	Washington and Lee	Sirrine Stadium; Greenville, SC	L 7–25	9,000	
September 28	West Virginia	Sirrine Stadium; Greenville, SC	L 7–18	6,500	
October 6	at South Carolina	Carolina Stadium; Columbia, SC	L 6–21	12,000	
October 12	Stetson*	Sirrine Stadium; Greenville, SC	L 20–21	4,500	
October 19	vs. The Citadel	County Fairgrounds; Orangeburg, SC (rivalry)	W 35–14	7,500	
October 26	at George Washington	Griffith Stadium; Washington, DC	T 19–19	8,200	
November 2	at Wofford*	Snyder Field; Spartanburg, SC (rivalry)	L 12–14		
November 9	Newberry*	Sirrine Stadium; Greenville, SC	W 33–13	2,500	
November 17	Clemson	Sirrine Stadium; Greenville, SC	L 14–34		
*Non-conference game
