= 1951 VMI Keydets football team =

American college football season

1951 VMI Keydets football

SoCon co-champion
- Conference: Southern Conference
- Record: 7–3 (5–0 SoCon)
- Head coach: Tom Nugent (3rd season)
- Home stadium: Wilson Field

1951 Southern Conference football standings
	Conf.					Overall
Team	W		L		T	W		L		T
No. 3 Maryland +	5	–	0	–	0	10	–	0	–	0
VMI +	5	–	0	–	0	7	–	3	–	0
Washington and Lee	5	–	1	–	0	6	–	4	–	0
William & Mary	5	–	1	–	0	7	–	3	–	0
No. 19 Clemson	3	–	1	–	0	7	–	3	–	0
Duke	4	–	2	–	0	5	–	4	–	1
South Carolina	5	–	3	–	0	6	–	4	–	0
Wake Forest	5	–	3	–	0	6	–	4	–	0
George Washington	2	–	3	–	1	2	–	6	–	1
North Carolina	2	–	3	–	0	2	–	8	–	0
West Virginia	2	–	3	–	0	5	–	5	–	0
NC State	2	–	6	–	0	3	–	7	–	0
Richmond	2	–	6	–	0	3	–	8	–	0
The Citadel	1	–	3	–	0	4	–	6	–	0
Furman	1	–	4	–	1	3	–	6	–	1
Davidson	1	–	5	–	0	1	–	8	–	0
VPI	1	–	7	–	0	2	–	8	–	0
+ – Conference co-champions; Rankings from AP Poll

The 1951 VMI Keydets football team was an American football team that represented the Virginia Military Institute (VMI) during the 1951 college football season as a member of the Southern Conference. In their third year under head coach Tom Nugent, the team compiled an overall record of 7–3 and finished as Southern Conference co-champion.

VMI was ranked at No. 92 in the 1951 Litkenhous Ratings.

== Schedule ==
Date	Opponent	Site	Result	Attendance	Source
September 15	at Cincinnati*	Nippert Stadium; Cincinnati, OH	L 7–26	24,000	
September 22	Wofford*	Wilson Field; Lexington, VA	W 29–6		
September 29	at Richmond	City Stadium; Richmond, VA (rivalry)	W 34–0	8,500	
October 6	at William & Mary	Cary Field; Williamsburg, VA (rivalry)	W 20–7	16,000	
October 20	at Virginia*	Scott Stadium; Charlottesville, VA	L 14–34	24,000	
October 27	at Catawba*	Shuford Stadium; Salisbury, NC	W 34–14	3,000	
November 3	Davidson^{†}	Wilson Field; Lexington, VA	W 35–13	3,000	
November 10	at Georgia Tech*	Grant Field; Atlanta, GA	L 7–34	21,000	
November 17	at The Citadel	Johnson Hagood Stadium; Charleston, SC (rivalry)	W 27–21	7,000	
November 22	vs. VPI	Victory Stadium; Roanoke, VA (rivalry)	W 20–7	22,000	
*Non-conference game; ^{†}Homecoming
