= 1951 Washington and Lee Generals football team =

American college football season

1951 Washington and Lee Generals football
- Conference: Southern Conference
- Record: 6–4 (5–1 SoCon)
- Head coach: George T. Barclay (3rd season)

1951 Southern Conference football standings
	Conf.					Overall
Team	W		L		T	W		L		T
No. 3 Maryland +	5	–	0	–	0	10	–	0	–	0
VMI +	5	–	0	–	0	7	–	3	–	0
Washington and Lee	5	–	1	–	0	6	–	4	–	0
William & Mary	5	–	1	–	0	7	–	3	–	0
No. 19 Clemson	3	–	1	–	0	7	–	3	–	0
Duke	4	–	2	–	0	5	–	4	–	1
South Carolina	5	–	3	–	0	6	–	4	–	0
Wake Forest	5	–	3	–	0	6	–	4	–	0
George Washington	2	–	3	–	1	2	–	6	–	1
North Carolina	2	–	3	–	0	2	–	8	–	0
West Virginia	2	–	3	–	0	5	–	5	–	0
NC State	2	–	6	–	0	3	–	7	–	0
Richmond	2	–	6	–	0	3	–	8	–	0
The Citadel	1	–	3	–	0	4	–	6	–	0
Furman	1	–	4	–	1	3	–	6	–	1
Davidson	1	–	5	–	0	1	–	8	–	0
VPI	1	–	7	–	0	2	–	8	–	0
+ – Conference co-champions; Rankings from AP Poll

The 1951 Washington and Lee Generals football team was an American football team that represented the Washington and Lee University as a member of the Southern Conference (SoCon) during the 1951 college football season. Led by George T. Barclay in his third and final season as head coach, the Generals compiled an overall record of 6–4 with a mark of 5–1 in conference play, tying for third place in the SoCon. The team was ranked at No. 66 in the 1951 Litkenhous Ratings.

== Schedule ==
Date	Time	Opponent	Site	Result	Attendance	Source
September 21		at Furman	Sirrine Stadium; Greenville, SC	W 25–7	9,000	
September 29		No. 16 Maryland	Wilson Field; Lexington, VA	L 14–54	9,000	
October 6		at West Virginia	Mountaineer Field; Morgantown, WV	W 34–0	16,000	
October 13		Virginia*	Wilson Field; Lexington, VA	W 42–14	10,000	
October 19		at Miami (FL)*	Burdine Stadium; Miami, FL	L 12–32	39,402	
October 27		Davidson^{†}	Wilson Field; Lexington, VA	W 34–0	6,000	
November 3		vs. VPI	City Stadium; Richmond, VA	W 60–0		
November 10		at No. 1 Tennessee*	Shields–Watkins Field; Knoxville, TN	L 14–60	20,000	
November 17		at Louisville*	duPont Manual Stadium; Louisville, KY	L 7–14	6,000	
November 22	2:00 p.m.	at Richmond	City Stadium; Richmond, VA	W 39–7	7,000	
*Non-conference game; ^{†}Homecoming; Rankings from AP Poll released prior to the game; All times are in Eastern time
