= 1951 Davidson Wildcats football team =

American college football season

1951 Davidson Wildcats football
- Conference: Southern Conference
- Record: 1–8 (1–5 SoCon)
- Head coach: Crowell Little (2nd season)
- Home stadium: Richardson Stadium

1951 Southern Conference football standings
	Conf.					Overall
Team	W		L		T	W		L		T
No. 3 Maryland +	5	–	0	–	0	10	–	0	–	0
VMI +	5	–	0	–	0	7	–	3	–	0
Washington and Lee	5	–	1	–	0	6	–	4	–	0
William & Mary	5	–	1	–	0	7	–	3	–	0
No. 19 Clemson	3	–	1	–	0	7	–	3	–	0
Duke	4	–	2	–	0	5	–	4	–	1
South Carolina	5	–	3	–	0	6	–	4	–	0
Wake Forest	5	–	3	–	0	6	–	4	–	0
George Washington	2	–	3	–	1	2	–	6	–	1
North Carolina	2	–	3	–	0	2	–	8	–	0
West Virginia	2	–	3	–	0	5	–	5	–	0
NC State	2	–	6	–	0	3	–	7	–	0
Richmond	2	–	6	–	0	3	–	8	–	0
The Citadel	1	–	3	–	0	4	–	6	–	0
Furman	1	–	4	–	1	3	–	6	–	1
Davidson	1	–	5	–	0	1	–	8	–	0
VPI	1	–	7	–	0	2	–	8	–	0
+ – Conference co-champions; Rankings from AP Poll

The 1951 Davidson Wildcats football team was an American football team that represented Davidson College as a member of the Southern Conference (SoCon) during the 1951 college football season. Led by Crowell Little in his second and final year as head coach, the Wildcats compiled an overall record of 1–8 with a mark of 1–5 in conference play, placing 16th in the SoCon.

== Schedule ==
Date	Time	Opponent	Site	Result	Attendance	Source
September 22	8:00 p.m.	Lenoir Rhyne*	Richardson Stadium; Davidson, NC	L 7–21	5,000	
September 29		at VPI	Miles Stadium; Blacksburg, VA	W 32–20	6,000	
October 6		The Citadel	Richardson Stadium; Davidson, NC	L 14–34		
October 13		Presbyterian*	Richardson Stadium; Davidson, NC	L 12–14		
October 20		at Richmond	City Stadium; Richmond, VA	L 6–25		
October 27		at Washington and Lee	Wilson Field; Lexington, VA	L 0–34	6,000	
November 3	Wilson Field	at VMI	Wilson Field; Lexington, VA	L 13–35	3,000	
November 10		vs. NC State	American Legion Memorial Stadium; Charlotte, NC	L 0–31	7,000	
November 24		at No. 7 Georgia Tech*	Grant Field; Atlanta, GA	L 7–34	18,000	
*Non-conference game; Rankings from AP Poll released prior to the game; All times are in Eastern time
