= 1951 Duke Blue Devils football team =

American college football season

1951 Duke Blue Devils football
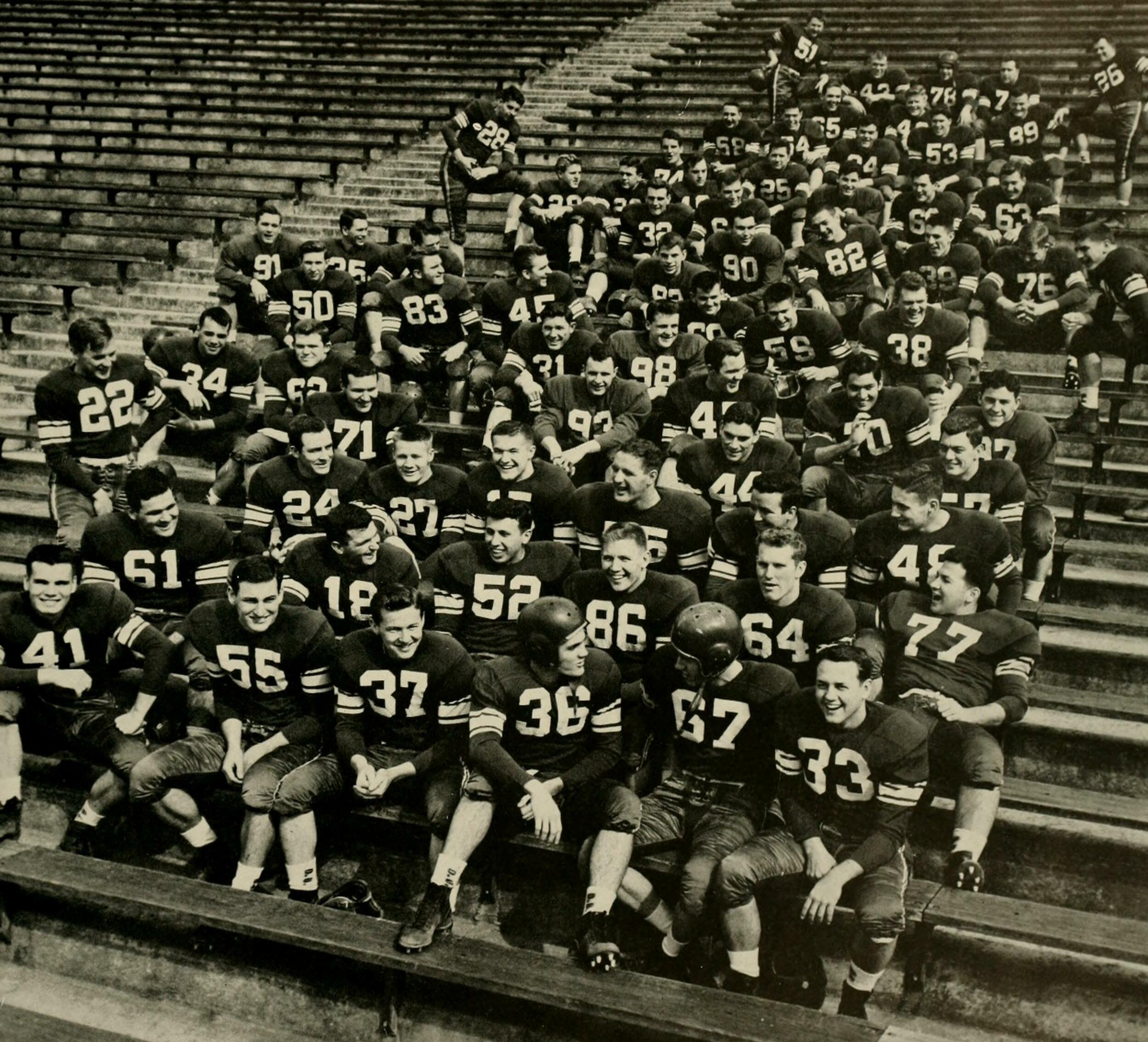
- Conference: Southern Conference
- Record: 5–4–1 (4–2 SoCon)
- Head coach: William D. Murray (1st season)
- MVP: Bob Bickel
- Captain: James Gibson
- Home stadium: Duke Stadium

1951 Southern Conference football standings
| | Conf. | | | | | Overall |
| Team | W | | L | | T | W | | L | | T |
|---|---|---|---|---|---|---|---|---|---|---|
| No. 3 Maryland + | 5 | – | 0 | – | 0 | 10 | – | 0 | – | 0 |
| VMI + | 5 | – | 0 | – | 0 | 7 | – | 3 | – | 0 |
| Washington and Lee | 5 | – | 1 | – | 0 | 6 | – | 4 | – | 0 |
| William & Mary | 5 | – | 1 | – | 0 | 7 | – | 3 | – | 0 |
| No. 19 Clemson | 3 | – | 1 | – | 0 | 7 | – | 3 | – | 0 |
| Duke | 4 | – | 2 | – | 0 | 5 | – | 4 | – | 1 |
| South Carolina | 5 | – | 3 | – | 0 | 6 | – | 4 | – | 0 |
| Wake Forest | 5 | – | 3 | – | 0 | 6 | – | 4 | – | 0 |
| George Washington | 2 | – | 3 | – | 1 | 2 | – | 6 | – | 1 |
| North Carolina | 2 | – | 3 | – | 0 | 2 | – | 8 | – | 0 |
| West Virginia | 2 | – | 3 | – | 0 | 5 | – | 5 | – | 0 |
| NC State | 2 | – | 6 | – | 0 | 3 | – | 7 | – | 0 |
| Richmond | 2 | – | 6 | – | 0 | 3 | – | 8 | – | 0 |
| The Citadel | 1 | – | 3 | – | 0 | 4 | – | 6 | – | 0 |
| Furman | 1 | – | 4 | – | 1 | 3 | – | 6 | – | 1 |
| Davidson | 1 | – | 5 | – | 0 | 1 | – | 8 | – | 0 |
| VPI | 1 | – | 7 | – | 0 | 2 | – | 8 | – | 0 |
+ – Conference co-champions; Rankings from AP Poll

The 1951 Duke Blue Devils football team was an American football team that represented Duke University as a member of the Southern Conference (SoCon) during the 1951 college football season. In their first year under head coach William D. Murray, the Blue Devils compiled an overall record of 5–4–1, with a conference record of 4–2, and finished sixth in the SoCon.

The team was ranked at No. 51 in the 1951 Litkenhous Ratings.

== Schedule ==
| Date | Opponent | Rank | Site | Result | Attendance | Source |
|---|---|---|---|---|---|---|
| September 22 | at South Carolina | | Carolina Stadium; Columbia, SC | W 34–6 | 28,000 | |
| September 29 | at Pittsburgh* | | Pitt Stadium; Pittsburgh, PA | W 19–14 | 20,066 | |
| October 6 | at No. 3 Tennessee* | No. 16 | Shields–Watkins Field; Knoxville, TN | L 0–26 | 45,000 | |
| October 13 | NC State | | Duke Stadium; Durham, NC (rivalry) | W 27–21 | 23,000 | |
| October 20 | vs. VPI | | Foreman Field; Norfolk, VA (Oyster Bowl) | W 55–6 | 20,000 | |
| October 27 | Virginia*^{†} | | Duke Stadium; Durham, NC | L 7–30 | 25,000 | |
| November 3 | at No. 5 Georgia Tech* | | Grant Field; Atlanta, GA | T 14–14 | 36,000 | |
| November 10 | Wake Forest | | Duke Stadium; Durham, NC (rivalry) | L 13–19 | 30,000 | |
| November 17 | at William & Mary | | Cary Field; Williamsburg, VA | L 13–14 | 14,000 | |
| November 24 | North Carolina | | Duke Stadium; Durham, NC (Victory Bell) | W 19–7 | 41,300–50,000 | |
*Non-conference game; ^{†}Homecoming; Rankings from AP Poll released prior to the game
