= 1951 Wake Forest Demon Deacons football team =

American college football season

1951 Wake Forest Demon Deacons football
- Conference: Southern Conference
- Record: 6–4 (5–3 SoCon)
- Head coach: Tom Rogers (1st season)
- Captain: Game captains
- Home stadium: Groves Stadium

1951 Southern Conference football standings
	Conf.					Overall
Team	W		L		T	W		L		T
No. 3 Maryland +	5	–	0	–	0	10	–	0	–	0
VMI +	5	–	0	–	0	7	–	3	–	0
Washington and Lee	5	–	1	–	0	6	–	4	–	0
William & Mary	5	–	1	–	0	7	–	3	–	0
No. 19 Clemson	3	–	1	–	0	7	–	3	–	0
Duke	4	–	2	–	0	5	–	4	–	1
South Carolina	5	–	3	–	0	6	–	4	–	0
Wake Forest	5	–	3	–	0	6	–	4	–	0
George Washington	2	–	3	–	1	2	–	6	–	1
North Carolina	2	–	3	–	0	2	–	8	–	0
West Virginia	2	–	3	–	0	5	–	5	–	0
NC State	2	–	6	–	0	3	–	7	–	0
Richmond	2	–	6	–	0	3	–	8	–	0
The Citadel	1	–	3	–	0	4	–	6	–	0
Furman	1	–	4	–	1	3	–	6	–	1
Davidson	1	–	5	–	0	1	–	8	–	0
VPI	1	–	7	–	0	2	–	8	–	0
+ – Conference co-champions; Rankings from AP Poll

The 1951 Wake Forest Demon Deacons football team was an American football team that represented Wake Forest University during the 1951 college football season. The team compiled a 6–4 record and finished in a tie for seventh place in the Southern Conference. After 14 seasons under head coach Peahead Walker, Tom Rogers took over as head coach in 1951. The team was ranked at No. 57 in the 1951 Litkenhous Ratings.

End Jack Lewis and tackle Bill George were selected by the Associated Press as first-team players on the 1951 All-Southern Conference football team.

== Schedule ==
Date	Opponent	Site	Result	Attendance	Source
September 21	at Boston College*	Braves Field; Boston, MA	W 20–6	20,587	
September 29	at NC State	Riddick Stadium; Raleigh, NC (rivalry)	W 21–6	22,300	
October 6	Richmond	Groves Stadium; Wake Forest, NC	W 56–6	7,000	
October 13	vs. William & Mary	City Stadium; Richmond, VA (Tobacco Bowl)	L 7–6	18,000	
October 19	at George Washington	Griffith Stadium; Washington, DC	W 27–13	10,000	
October 27	North Carolina	Groves Stadium; Wake Forest, NC (rivalry)	W 39–7	24,000	
November 3	at Clemson	Memorial Stadium; Clemson, SC	L 6–21	24,000	
November 10	at Duke	Duke Stadium; Durham, NC (rivalry)	W 19–13	30,000	
November 17	at No. 10 Baylor*	Baylor Stadium; Waco, TX	L 0–42	20,000	
November 22	at South Carolina	Carolina Stadium; Columbia, SC	L 6–21	18,000	
*Non-conference game; Rankings from AP Poll released prior to the game

== Team leaders ==
Category	Team Leader	Att/Cth	Yds
Passing	Ed Kissell	56/120	593
Rushing	Guido Scarton	106	507
Receiving	Jack Lewis	32	488
