= 1951 Richmond Spiders football team =

American college football season

1951 Richmond Spiders football
- Conference: Southern Conference
- Record: 3–8 (2–6 SoCon)
- Head coach: Ed Merrick (1st season)
- Captain: Johnny Mac Brown
- Home stadium: City Stadium

1951 Southern Conference football standings
	Conf.					Overall
Team	W		L		T	W		L		T
No. 3 Maryland +	5	–	0	–	0	10	–	0	–	0
VMI +	5	–	0	–	0	7	–	3	–	0
Washington and Lee	5	–	1	–	0	6	–	4	–	0
William & Mary	5	–	1	–	0	7	–	3	–	0
No. 19 Clemson	3	–	1	–	0	7	–	3	–	0
Duke	4	–	2	–	0	5	–	4	–	1
South Carolina	5	–	3	–	0	6	–	4	–	0
Wake Forest	5	–	3	–	0	6	–	4	–	0
George Washington	2	–	3	–	1	2	–	6	–	1
North Carolina	2	–	3	–	0	2	–	8	–	0
West Virginia	2	–	3	–	0	5	–	5	–	0
NC State	2	–	6	–	0	3	–	7	–	0
Richmond	2	–	6	–	0	3	–	8	–	0
The Citadel	1	–	3	–	0	4	–	6	–	0
Furman	1	–	4	–	1	3	–	6	–	1
Davidson	1	–	5	–	0	1	–	8	–	0
VPI	1	–	7	–	0	2	–	8	–	0
+ – Conference co-champions; Rankings from AP Poll

The 1951 Richmond Spiders football team was an American football team that represented the University of Richmond as a member of the Southern Conference (SoCon) during the 1951 college football season. Led by first-year head coach Ed Merrick, the Spiders compiled an overall record of 3–8 with a mark of 2–6 in conference play, tying for 12th place in the SoCon. The team's captain was Johnny Mac Brown.

== Schedule ==
Date	Time	Opponent	Site	Result	Attendance	Source
September 22		Randolph–Macon*	City Stadium; Richmond, VA	W 13–6	10,000	
September 29		VMI	City Stadium; Richmond, VA (rivalry)	L 0–34	7,000	
October 6		at Wake Forest	Groves Stadium; Wake Forest, NC	L 6–56	7,000	
October 13		at West Virginia	Mountaineer Field; Morgantown, WV	L 0–24		
October 20		Davidson	City Stadium; Richmond, VA	W 25–6		
October 27		William & Mary^{†}	City Stadium; Richmond, VA (rivalry)	L 14–20	5,000	
November 2		at Boston College*	Braves Field; Boston, MA	L 7–21	5,514	
November 10	8:00 p.m.	at Stetson*	DeLand Municipal Stadium; DeLand, FL	L 14–19		
November 17		at VPI	Miles Stadium; Blacksburg, VA	L 14–20	5,000	
November 22	2:00 p.m.	Washington and Lee	City Stadium; Richmond, VA	L 7–39	7,000	
November 30		at George Washington	Griffith Stadium; Washington, DC	W 20–19		
*Non-conference game; ^{†}Homecoming; All times are in Eastern time
