= Ed Meadows =

American football player (1932–1974)

No. 76, 82, 86, 66, 83, 70
- Positions: Defensive end, end

Personal information
- Born: February 19, 1932; Oxford, North Carolina, U.S.
- Died: October 22, 1974 (aged 42); Pine Knoll Shores, North Carolina, U.S.
- Listed height: 6 ft 2 in (1.88 m)
- Listed weight: 221 lb (100 kg)

Career information
- High school: Oxford
- College: Duke (1950–1953)
- NFL draft: 1954: 3rd round, 30th overall pick

Career history
- Chicago Bears (1954); Pittsburgh Steelers (1955); Chicago Bears (1956–1957); Philadelphia Eagles (1958); Washington Redskins (1959); Montreal Alouettes (1961)

Awards and highlights
- Second-team All-Pro (1956); 2× First-team All-American (1952, 1953); First-team All-ACC (1953); First-team All-Southern (1952)

Career NFL statistics
- Fumble recoveries: 4
- Stats at Pro Football Reference

Edward Allen Meadows (February 19, 1932 – October 22, 1974) was an American professional football player who was a defensive end in the National Football League (NFL) for the Chicago Bears, Pittsburgh Steelers, Philadelphia Eagles, and Washington Redskins. He played college football for the Duke Blue Devils.

== Early life ==
Born and raised in Oxford, North Carolina, "Country" Meadows graduated from Oxford High School in 1950 and played college football at Duke University in Durham. An All-American, he had academic issues while in college, and was forced to withdraw after his junior season. He was selected in the third round of the 1954 NFL draft.

== Professional career ==
Meadows became a controversial player in his third year due to a play in the 1956 regular season finale against the Detroit Lions. The Bears (8–2–1) hosted the Lions (9–2) at Wrigley Field and needed a win to claim the Western Conference title. Early in the second quarter, Meadows' vicious hit behind the play, a pitchout to running back Gene Gedman, knocked Detroit's hall of fame quarterback Bobby Layne out of the game with a concussion. He was not penalized for that play but was soon ejected, near the end of the first half, for unsportsmanlike conduct against Lion fullback Bill Bowman. The Bears won the game 38–21 and advanced to the league title game. Detroit head coach Buddy Parker felt strongly that the late hit on Layne was both cheap and illegal, and appealed to NFL Commissioner Bert Bell to suspend Meadows, but no action was taken. He played in the NFL championship game two weeks later in Yankee Stadium against the Giants, which New York won in a rout, 47–7.

After sitting out the 1960 season, he played three games with the Montreal Alouettes of the Canadian Football League in 1961, but chronic shoulder injuries led to his release in August 1962.

== After football ==
Meadows was later in the tire business in North Carolina; he died at his home near Morehead City in 1974 at age 42, from a self-inflicted gunshot wound to the chest. He is buried at Elmwood Cemetery in his hometown of Oxford.
