= 1951 William & Mary Indians football team =

American college football season

1951 William & Mary Indians football
- Conference: Southern Conference
- Record: 7–3 (5–1 SoCon)
- Head coach: Marvin Bass (1st season)
- Captains: Dickie Lewis; George Zupko
- Home stadium: Cary Field

1951 Southern Conference football standings
	Conf.					Overall
Team	W		L		T	W		L		T
No. 3 Maryland +	5	–	0	–	0	10	–	0	–	0
VMI +	5	–	0	–	0	7	–	3	–	0
Washington and Lee	5	–	1	–	0	6	–	4	–	0
William & Mary	5	–	1	–	0	7	–	3	–	0
No. 19 Clemson	3	–	1	–	0	7	–	3	–	0
Duke	4	–	2	–	0	5	–	4	–	1
South Carolina	5	–	3	–	0	6	–	4	–	0
Wake Forest	5	–	3	–	0	6	–	4	–	0
George Washington	2	–	3	–	1	2	–	6	–	1
North Carolina	2	–	3	–	0	2	–	8	–	0
West Virginia	2	–	3	–	0	5	–	5	–	0
NC State	2	–	6	–	0	3	–	7	–	0
Richmond	2	–	6	–	0	3	–	8	–	0
The Citadel	1	–	3	–	0	4	–	6	–	0
Furman	1	–	4	–	1	3	–	6	–	1
Davidson	1	–	5	–	0	1	–	8	–	0
VPI	1	–	7	–	0	2	–	8	–	0
+ – Conference co-champions; Rankings from AP Poll

The 1951 William & Mary Indians football team represented the College of William & Mary as a member of the Southern Conference (SoCon) during the 1951 college football season. Led by first-year head coach Marvin Bass, the Indians compiled an overall record of 7–3 with a mark of 5–1 in conference play, and finished tied for third in the SoCon. William & Mary played home games at Cary Field in Williamsburg, Virginia.

The season was notable for a scandal that involved former head coach Rube McCray tampering with football players' transcripts and credits to enable NCAA eligibility.

William & Mary was ranked at No. 91 in the 1951 Litkenhous Ratings.

== Schedule ==
Date	Opponent	Site	Result	Attendance	Source
September 22	Boston University*	Cary Field; Williamsburg, VA	W 34–25	10,000	
September 29	at No. 4 Oklahoma*	Oklahoma Memorial Stadium; Norman, OK	L 7–49	39,184	
October 6	VMI	Cary Field; Williamsburg, VA (rivalry)	L 7–20	16,000	
October 13	vs. Wake Forest	City Stadium; Richmond, VA (Tobacco Bowl)	W 7–6	20,000	
October 20	at NC State	Riddick Stadium; Raleigh, NC	W 35–28	7,000	
October 27	at Richmond	City Stadium; Richmond, VA (rivalry)	W 20–14	5,000	
November 3	at Penn*	Franklin Field; Philadelphia, PA	W 20–12	12,801	
November 10	VPI^{†}	Cary Field; Williamsburg, VA	W 28–7	8,000	
November 17	Duke	Cary Field; Williamsburg, VA	W 14–13	14,000	
November 24	at No. 15 Virginia*	Scott Stadium; Charlottesville, VA	L 0–46	26,000	
*Non-conference game; ^{†}Homecoming; Rankings from AP Poll released prior to the game

== NFL draft selections ==
= Pro Football Hall of Fame	= Canadian Football Hall of Fame	= College Football Hall of Fame

Year	Round	Pick	Overall	Name	Team	Position
1952	20	12	241	Ed Weber	Los Angeles Rams	Back
