= 1953 All-Atlantic Coast Conference football team =

American college football all-star team

The 1953 All-Atlantic Coast Conference football team consists of American football players chosen by the Associated Press (AP) and the United Press (UP) as the best players at each position from the players on teams participating in the Atlantic Coast Conference ("ACC") during the 1953 college football season.

The following three teams dominated the All-ACC selections:

- The 1953 Maryland Terrapins football team tied for the ACC championship and was also ranked No. 1 in the final AP and UPI polls. The Terrapins placed four players on the All-ACC team.
- The 1953 Duke Blue Devils football team tied Maryland for the ACC championship and also placed four players on the All-ACC team.
- The 1953 South Carolina Gamecocks football team tied for third place in the ACC and also placed four players on the All-ACC team.

== All-Atlantic Coast selections ==
=== Ends ===
- Clyde Bennett, South Carolina (AP-1, UP-1)
- Howard Pitt, Duke (AP-1, UP-1)
- Dreher Gaskin, Clemson (AP-2)
- Bill Walker, Maryland (AP-2)

=== Tackles ===
- Stan Jones, Maryland (AP-1, UP-1)
- Ed Meadows, Duke (AP-1, UP-1)
- Bob Bartholomew, Wake Forest (AP-2)
- Bob Morgan, Maryland (AP-2)

=== Guards ===
- Bobby Burrows, Duke (AP-1, UP-1)
- Frank Mincevich, South Carolina (AP-1, UP-1)
- Bob King, South Carolina (AP-2)
- John Bowersox, Maryland (AP-2)

=== Centers ===
- Leon Cunningham, South Carolina (AP-1, UP-1)
- John Irvine, Maryland (AP-2)

=== Backs ===
- Bernie Faloney, Maryland (AP-1, UP-1) (Canadian Football Hall of Fame)
- Chet Hanulak, Maryland (AP-1, UP-1)
- James "Red" Smith, Duke (AP-1, UP-1)
- Ralph Felton, Maryland (AP-1)
- John Gramling, South Carolina (UP-1; AP-2)
- Don King, Clemson (AP-2)
- Carl Brazell, South Carolina (AP-2)
- Eddie West, NC State (AP-2)

== Key ==
AP = Associated Press
UP = United Press

== See also ==
- 1953 College Football All-America Team
