= 1951 Clemson Tigers football team =

American college football season

1951 Clemson Tigers football

Gator Bowl, L 0–14 vs. Miami (FL)
- Conference: Southern Conference

Ranking
- AP: No. T–19
- Record: 7–3 (3–1 SoCon)
- Head coach: Frank Howard (12th season)
- Captain: Bob Patton
- Home stadium: Memorial Stadium

1951 Southern Conference football standings
	Conf.					Overall
Team	W		L		T	W		L		T
No. 3 Maryland +	5	–	0	–	0	10	–	0	–	0
VMI +	5	–	0	–	0	7	–	3	–	0
Washington and Lee	5	–	1	–	0	6	–	4	–	0
William & Mary	5	–	1	–	0	7	–	3	–	0
No. 19 Clemson	3	–	1	–	0	7	–	3	–	0
Duke	4	–	2	–	0	5	–	4	–	1
South Carolina	5	–	3	–	0	6	–	4	–	0
Wake Forest	5	–	3	–	0	6	–	4	–	0
George Washington	2	–	3	–	1	2	–	6	–	1
North Carolina	2	–	3	–	0	2	–	8	–	0
West Virginia	2	–	3	–	0	5	–	5	–	0
NC State	2	–	6	–	0	3	–	7	–	0
Richmond	2	–	6	–	0	3	–	8	–	0
The Citadel	1	–	3	–	0	4	–	6	–	0
Furman	1	–	4	–	1	3	–	6	–	1
Davidson	1	–	5	–	0	1	–	8	–	0
VPI	1	–	7	–	0	2	–	8	–	0
+ – Conference co-champions; Rankings from AP Poll

The 1951 Clemson Tigers football team was an American football team that represented Clemson College in the Southern Conference during the 1951 college football season. In its 12th season under head coach Frank Howard, the team compiled a 7–3 record (3–1 against conference opponents), finished fifth in the Southern Conference, was tied with Holy Cross at No. 19 in the final AP Poll, lost to Miami (FL) in the 1952 Gator Bowl, and outscored all opponents by a total of 196 to 97. The team played its home games at Memorial Stadium in Clemson, South Carolina.

Bob Patton was the team captain. The team's statistical leaders included tailback Billy Hair with 1,004 passing yards and 698 rushing yards and end Glenn Smith with 42 points (7 touchdowns).

Billy Hair and Glenn Smith were selected as first-team players on the 1951 All-Southern Conference football team. Four Clemson players were named to the All-South Carolina football team for 1951: Hair, Smith, tackle Bob Patton, and guard Dan DiMucci.

== Schedule ==
Date	Time	Opponent	Rank	Site	Result	Attendance	Source
September 22	8:00 p.m.	Presbyterian*		Memorial Stadium; Clemson, SC	W 53–6		
September 29	9:15 p.m.	at Rice*		Rice Stadium; Houston, TX	W 20–14	35,000	
October 6	8:00 p.m.	at NC State	No. 18	Riddick Stadium; Raleigh, NC (Textile Bowl)	W 6–0	20,000	
October 13	11:00 p.m.	at No. 20 Pacific (CA)*	No. 16	Pacific Memorial Stadium; Stockton, CA	L 7–21		
October 25	2:00 p.m.	at South Carolina		Carolina Stadium; Columbia, SC (rivalry)	L 0–20	35,000	
November 3	2:00 p.m.	Wake Forest		Memorial Stadium; Clemson, SC	W 21–6	24,000	
November 10	2:00 p.m.	Boston College*		Memorial Stadium; Clemson, SC (rivalry)	W 21–2	14,000	
November 17	2:00 p.m.	at Furman		Sirrine Stadium; Greenville, SC	W 34–14		
November 24	2:00 p.m.	Auburn*		Memorial Stadium; Clemson, SC (rivalry)	W 34–0	18,500	
January 1, 1952		vs. Miami (FL)*	No. 19	Gator Bowl Stadium; Jacksonville, FL (Gator Bowl)	L 0–14	37,208	
*Non-conference game; Rankings from AP Poll released prior to the game; All times are in Eastern time
