= 1951 VPI Gobblers football team =

American college football season

1951 VPI Gobblers football
- Conference: Southern Conference
- Record: 2–8 (1–7 SoCon)
- Head coach: Frank Moseley (1st season)
- Home stadium: Miles Stadium

1951 Southern Conference football standings
| | Conf. | | | | | Overall |
| Team | W | | L | | T | W | | L | | T |
|---|---|---|---|---|---|---|---|---|---|---|
| No. 3 Maryland + | 5 | – | 0 | – | 0 | 10 | – | 0 | – | 0 |
| VMI + | 5 | – | 0 | – | 0 | 7 | – | 3 | – | 0 |
| Washington and Lee | 5 | – | 1 | – | 0 | 6 | – | 4 | – | 0 |
| William & Mary | 5 | – | 1 | – | 0 | 7 | – | 3 | – | 0 |
| No. 19 Clemson | 3 | – | 1 | – | 0 | 7 | – | 3 | – | 0 |
| Duke | 4 | – | 2 | – | 0 | 5 | – | 4 | – | 1 |
| South Carolina | 5 | – | 3 | – | 0 | 6 | – | 4 | – | 0 |
| Wake Forest | 5 | – | 3 | – | 0 | 6 | – | 4 | – | 0 |
| George Washington | 2 | – | 3 | – | 1 | 2 | – | 6 | – | 1 |
| North Carolina | 2 | – | 3 | – | 0 | 2 | – | 8 | – | 0 |
| West Virginia | 2 | – | 3 | – | 0 | 5 | – | 5 | – | 0 |
| NC State | 2 | – | 6 | – | 0 | 3 | – | 7 | – | 0 |
| Richmond | 2 | – | 6 | – | 0 | 3 | – | 8 | – | 0 |
| The Citadel | 1 | – | 3 | – | 0 | 4 | – | 6 | – | 0 |
| Furman | 1 | – | 4 | – | 1 | 3 | – | 6 | – | 1 |
| Davidson | 1 | – | 5 | – | 0 | 1 | – | 8 | – | 0 |
| VPI | 1 | – | 7 | – | 0 | 2 | – | 8 | – | 0 |
+ – Conference co-champions; Rankings from AP Poll

The 1951 VPI Gobblers football team represented the Virginia Polytechnic Institute in the 1951 college football season. The team was led by their first-year head coach Frank Moseley and finished with a record of two wins and eight losses (2–8).

== Schedule ==
| Date | Time | Opponent | Site | Result | Attendance | Source |
|---|---|---|---|---|---|---|
| September 15 | 7:30 p.m. | vs. Marshall* | Bluefield Municipal Stadium; Bluefield, WV | W 18–12 | 8,000 | |
| September 29 | | Davidson | Miles Stadium; Blacksburg, VA | L 20–32 | 6,000 | |
| October 6 | | vs. Virginia* | Victory Stadium; Roanoke, VA (rivalry) | L 0–33 | 12,500 | |
| October 12 | | vs. George Washington | Tulloch Stadium at George Washington High School; Alexandria, VA | L 13–38 | 5,500 | |
| October 20 | | vs. Duke | Foreman Field; Norfolk, VA (Oyster Bowl) | L 6–55 | 20,000 | |
| October 27 | | NC State^{†} | Miles Stadium; Blacksburg, VA | L 14–19 | 10,000 | |
| November 3 | | vs. Washington and Lee | City Stadium; Richmond, VA | L 0–60 | | |
| November 10 | | at William & Mary | Cary Field; Williamsburg, VA | L 7–28 | 8,000 | |
| November 17 | | Richmond | Miles Stadium; Blacksburg, VA | W 20–14 | 5,000 | |
| November 22 | | vs. VMI | Victory Stadium; Roanoke, VA (rivalry) | L 7–20 | 22,000 | |
*Non-conference game; ^{†}Homecoming

== Roster ==
The following players were members of the 1951 football team according to the roster published in the 1952 edition of The Bugle, the Virginia Tech yearbook.

VPI 1951 roster
| Dean Gerrard Boyle; Frank Bradley; Tommy Bryant; Howard Cowan; Bill Cox; Johnny Dean; James Glen Fleenor; Eustace Frederick; Chester Gates; Harold Byrd Grizzard; James H. Haren; Charles Donald Herb; Dick Hiler; B.J. Hilman | Fran Hobbs; Howell; Tom Hughes; Shakeep Kassem; Julian Neville King; Richard Kuhn; Kurminski; Frank Ronald Kwiatkowski; Casimir Jerome "Ki" Luczak; Robert Stevens Luttrell; Marty Lyczak; Madison "Buzz" Nutter; Joe Onderko | Douglas Cooper Petty; Thomas R. Petty; Jack Warren Prater; George Preas; Bobby Seal; Sizemore; Pete Stevens; Hunter E. Swink; George Mitchell Tederick; Don "Ducky" Welsh; Norman Chad White; Jack Williams; Howard Irving Wright |
