= Frank Mincevich =

American football player

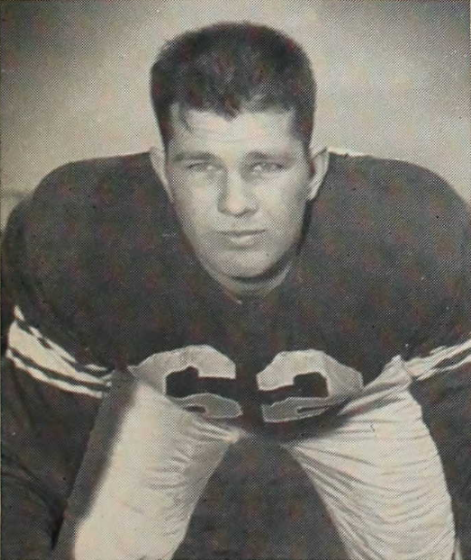
- Mincevich from 1953 Garnet and Black

Profile
- Position: Guard

Personal information
- Born: c. 1934
- Listed height: 6 ft 2 in (1.88 m)
- Listed weight: 240 lb (109 kg)

Career information
- College: South Carolina

Career history
- South Carolina Gamecocks (1954)

Awards and highlights
- First-team All-American (1954); 2× First-team All-ACC (1953, 1954)

Frank Mincevich (born c. 1934) was an American football player. Mincevich attended the University of South Carolina and played college football at the guard position for the South Carolina Gamecocks football team from 1952 to 1954. He was selected by the Football Writers Association of America as a first-team player on its 1954 College Football All-America Team. He was also a first-team player on the 1953 and 1954 All-Atlantic Coast Conference football teams. He was selected by the San Francisco 49ers in the fifth round (59th overall pick) of the 1954 NFL draft. He was cut by the 49ers in September 1955. He joined the Hamilton Tiger Cats but was cut in August 1956. He also signed with the New York Titans in 1960. In 2015, he was rated at No. 35 by The State on its list of the top 50 Gamecocks football player of all time.
