= 1951 The Citadel Bulldogs football team =

American college football season

1951 The Citadel Bulldogs football
- Conference: Southern Conference
- Record: 4–6 (1–3 SoCon)
- Head coach: J. Quinn Decker (6th season)
- Home stadium: Johnson Hagood Stadium

1951 Southern Conference football standings
| | Conf. | | | | | Overall |
| Team | W | | L | | T | W | | L | | T |
|---|---|---|---|---|---|---|---|---|---|---|
| No. 3 Maryland + | 5 | – | 0 | – | 0 | 10 | – | 0 | – | 0 |
| VMI + | 5 | – | 0 | – | 0 | 7 | – | 3 | – | 0 |
| Washington and Lee | 5 | – | 1 | – | 0 | 6 | – | 4 | – | 0 |
| William & Mary | 5 | – | 1 | – | 0 | 7 | – | 3 | – | 0 |
| No. 19 Clemson | 3 | – | 1 | – | 0 | 7 | – | 3 | – | 0 |
| Duke | 4 | – | 2 | – | 0 | 5 | – | 4 | – | 1 |
| South Carolina | 5 | – | 3 | – | 0 | 6 | – | 4 | – | 0 |
| Wake Forest | 5 | – | 3 | – | 0 | 6 | – | 4 | – | 0 |
| George Washington | 2 | – | 3 | – | 1 | 2 | – | 6 | – | 1 |
| North Carolina | 2 | – | 3 | – | 0 | 2 | – | 8 | – | 0 |
| West Virginia | 2 | – | 3 | – | 0 | 5 | – | 5 | – | 0 |
| NC State | 2 | – | 6 | – | 0 | 3 | – | 7 | – | 0 |
| Richmond | 2 | – | 6 | – | 0 | 3 | – | 8 | – | 0 |
| The Citadel | 1 | – | 3 | – | 0 | 4 | – | 6 | – | 0 |
| Furman | 1 | – | 4 | – | 1 | 3 | – | 6 | – | 1 |
| Davidson | 1 | – | 5 | – | 0 | 1 | – | 8 | – | 0 |
| VPI | 1 | – | 7 | – | 0 | 2 | – | 8 | – | 0 |
+ – Conference co-champions; Rankings from AP Poll

The 1951 The Citadel Bulldogs football team represented The Citadel, The Military College of South Carolina in the 1951 college football season. J. Quinn Decker served as head coach for the sixth season. The Bulldogs played as members of the Southern Conference and played home games at Johnson Hagood Stadium.

== Schedule ==
| Date | Opponent | Site | Result | Attendance | Source |
|---|---|---|---|---|---|
| September 22 | at Florida* | Florida Field; Gainesville, FL | L 7–27 | 40,000 | |
| October 1 | at South Carolina | Carolina Stadium; Columbia, SC | L 7–26 | 22,000 | |
| October 6 | at Davidson | Richardson Stadium; Davidson, NC | W 34–14 | | |
| October 12 | Newberry* | Johnson Hagood Stadium; Charleston, SC | W 41–7 | 6,000 | |
| October 19 | vs. Furman | County Fairgrounds; Orangeburg, SC (rivalry) | L 14–35 | 7,500 | |
| October 27 | Presbyterian* | Johnson Hagood Stadium; Charleston, SC | W 35–0 | 6,085 | |
| November 3 | at Virginia* | Scott Stadium; Charlottesville, VA | L 0–39 | 10,000 | |
| November 10 | at Army* | Mitchie Stadium; West Point, NY | L 6–27 | 28,183 | |
| November 17 | VMI | Johnson Hagood Stadium; Charleston, SC (rivalry) | L 21–27 | 7,000 | |
| November 24 | East Carolina* | Johnson Hagood Stadium; Charleston, SC | W 21–7 | 3,500 | |
*Non-conference game
