= Clyde Bennett =

American football player (1932–2021)

- Bennett with South Carolina

No. 71
- Position: End

Personal information
- Born: February 2, 1932; St. Matthews, South Carolina, U.S.
- Died: December 13, 2021 (aged 89); Lubbock, Texas, U.S.
- Listed height: 6 ft 2 in (1.88 m)
- Listed weight: 215 lb (98 kg)

Career information
- High school: St. Matthews
- College: South Carolina
- NFL draft: 1954: 3rd round, 28th overall pick

Career history
- Ottawa Rough Riders (1954)

Awards and highlights
- Third-team All-American (1953); First-team All-ACC (1953); South Carolina Athletics Hall of Fame (2003)

Career IRFU statistics
- Games played: 13
- Receptions: 26
- Receiving yards: 321

Clyde Eugene Bennett (February 2, 1932 – December 13, 2021) was an American professional gridiron football player who was an end for one season with the Ottawa Rough Riders of the Interprovincial Rugby Football Union (IRFU). He played college football for South Carolina Gamecocks, earning third-team All-American honors in 1953. Bennett was a third-round selection in the 1954 NFL draft by the New York Giants, but did not play for them.

== Early life and education ==
Bennett was born on February 2, 1932, in St. Matthews, South Carolina. He attended St. Matthews High School, graduating in 1950 before joining the University of South Carolina. During the 1950 season, Bennett played on the South Carolina freshman football team. He made the varsity roster in the next three seasons, leading the team in receiving in 1952 and 1953. He made 34 catches for 502 yards in 1952 and 23 catches for 413 yards in 1953. Bennett was named third-team All-American following his senior year of 1953. He was inducted into the South Carolina Athletics Hall of Fame in 2003 and was described by The State as one of the top 50 greatest Gamecocks in 2017.

== Professional career ==
Bennett was selected in the third round (28th overall) of the 1954 NFL draft by the New York Giants, but instead played for the Ottawa Rough Riders of the Interprovincial Rugby Football Union (IRFU). With the Rough Riders he appeared in thirteen games, wearing number 71. As a receiver, he caught 26 passes for 321 yards.

== Later life and death ==
Following the 1954 season, Bennett entered the United States Air Force, reaching the rank of Colonel. He arrived at Reese Air Force Base in 1957 for pilot training. There he met Dolores Roberson, who he married in 1960. He retired in 1978. Bennett died on December 13, 2021, at the age of 89.
