= 1951 George Washington Colonials football team =

American college football season

1951 George Washington Colonials football
- Conference: Southern Conference
- Record: 2–6–1 (2–3–1 SoCon)
- Head coach: Bo Rowland (4th season)
- Home stadium: Griffith Stadium

1951 Southern Conference football standings
| | Conf. | | | | | Overall |
| Team | W | | L | | T | W | | L | | T |
|---|---|---|---|---|---|---|---|---|---|---|
| No. 3 Maryland + | 5 | – | 0 | – | 0 | 10 | – | 0 | – | 0 |
| VMI + | 5 | – | 0 | – | 0 | 7 | – | 3 | – | 0 |
| Washington and Lee | 5 | – | 1 | – | 0 | 6 | – | 4 | – | 0 |
| William & Mary | 5 | – | 1 | – | 0 | 7 | – | 3 | – | 0 |
| No. 19 Clemson | 3 | – | 1 | – | 0 | 7 | – | 3 | – | 0 |
| Duke | 4 | – | 2 | – | 0 | 5 | – | 4 | – | 1 |
| South Carolina | 5 | – | 3 | – | 0 | 6 | – | 4 | – | 0 |
| Wake Forest | 5 | – | 3 | – | 0 | 6 | – | 4 | – | 0 |
| George Washington | 2 | – | 3 | – | 1 | 2 | – | 6 | – | 1 |
| North Carolina | 2 | – | 3 | – | 0 | 2 | – | 8 | – | 0 |
| West Virginia | 2 | – | 3 | – | 0 | 5 | – | 5 | – | 0 |
| NC State | 2 | – | 6 | – | 0 | 3 | – | 7 | – | 0 |
| Richmond | 2 | – | 6 | – | 0 | 3 | – | 8 | – | 0 |
| The Citadel | 1 | – | 3 | – | 0 | 4 | – | 6 | – | 0 |
| Furman | 1 | – | 4 | – | 1 | 3 | – | 6 | – | 1 |
| Davidson | 1 | – | 5 | – | 0 | 1 | – | 8 | – | 0 |
| VPI | 1 | – | 7 | – | 0 | 2 | – | 8 | – | 0 |
+ – Conference co-champions; Rankings from AP Poll

The 1951 George Washington Colonials football team was an American football team that represented George Washington University as part of the Southern Conference during the 1951 college football season. In their fourth season under head coach Bo Rowland, the team compiled a 2–6–1 record (2–3–1 in the SoCon).

== Schedule ==
| Date | Opponent | Site | Result | Attendance | Source |
|---|---|---|---|---|---|
| September 22 | at Georgia* | Sanford Stadium; Athens, GA | L 0–33 | 15,000 | |
| September 29 | at Virginia* | Scott Stadium; Charlottesville, VA | L 0–20 | 20,000 | |
| October 6 | at No. 9 Maryland | Byrd Stadium; College Park, MD | L 6–33 | 25,732 | |
| October 12 | VPI | George Washington HS Stadium; Alexandria, VA | W 38–13 | 5,500 | |
| October 19 | Wake Forest | Griffith Stadium; Washington, DC | L 13–27 | 10,000 | |
| October 26 | Furman | Griffith Stadium; Washington, DC | T 19–19 | 8,200 | |
| November 3 | at South Carolina | Carolina Stadium; Columbia, SC | W 20–14 | | |
| November 17 | at No. 9 Kentucky* | McLean Stadium; Lexington, KY | L 13–47 | 20,000 | |
| November 30 | Richmond | Griffith Stadium; Washington, DC | L 19–20 | | |
*Non-conference game; Rankings from AP Poll released prior to the game
