= Pete Ladygo =

American gridiron football player (1928–2014)

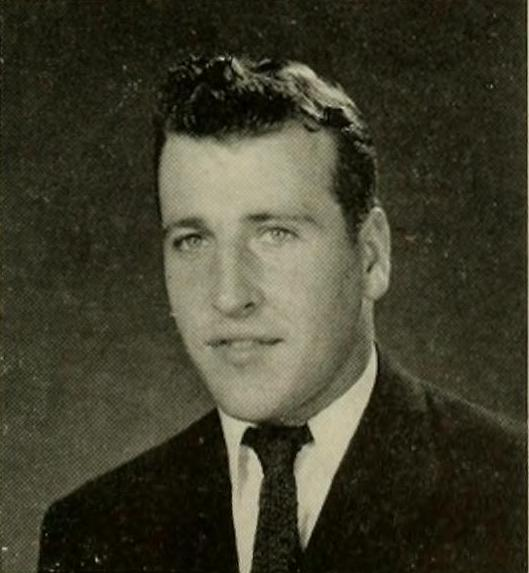
- Ladygo as a senior at Maryland in 1951

No. 66, 62, 54
- Positions: Guard, center, linebacker

Personal information
- Born: June 23, 1928; West Brownsville, Pennsylvania, U.S.
- Died: August 22, 2014 (aged 86); Keyser, West Virginia, U.S.
- Listed height: 6 ft 2 in (1.88 m)
- Listed weight: 240 lb (109 kg)

Career information
- High school: Allegheny (Pittsburgh, Pennsylvania)
- College: Maryland (1950–1951)
- NFL draft: 1952: 16th round, 186th overall pick

Career history
- Pittsburgh Steelers (1952–1954); Ottawa Rough Riders (1955)

Career NFL statistics
- Games played: 24
- Games started: 23
- Stats at Pro Football Reference

Peter Glenn Ladygo (June 23, 1928 – August 22, 2014) was an American football player. He played as a guard and linebacker for the Pittsburgh Steelers in the National Football League (NFL) from 1952 to 1954, and as a guard for the Ottawa Rough Riders in the Canadian Football League (CFL) in 1955. Ladygo played college football for the University of Maryland.

== Early life and college ==
Ladygo was born on June 23, 1928, in West Brownsville, Pennsylvania and attended Allegheny Prep School. He then went on to Potomac State College before transferring to the University of Maryland. There, he played college football under Jim Tatum and earned varsity letters in 1950 and 1951. In the 1950 upset win against second-ranked Michigan State, Ladygo returned an interception 23 yards for a touchdown. Against George Washington, he had a fumble recovery. In the 1951 season, he recovered a fumble against Washington & Lee in their end zone for Maryland's first touchdown of the year.

== Professional career ==
=== Pittsburgh Steelers ===
The Pittsburgh Steelers selected Ladygo with the 186th overall pick in the 16th round of the 1952 NFL draft. In June, he signed a contract with the franchise. He played three seasons for the Steelers from 1952 to 1954 as a right guard. In 1952, he played in twelve games and returned one kick for four yards. In August 1953, Ladygo was named among five "of the brightest names on the Steelers roster", who remained unsigned because they were dissatisfied with their contract offers. Owner Art Rooney, however, expected them to sign after the start of training camp. Ladygo suffered a broken leg, and did not see game action during the 1953 season. In 1954, Ladygo returned to play in all twelve games.

=== Ottawa Rough Riders ===
In 1955, he played for the Ottawa Rough Riders of the Canadian Football League. The Detroit Lions traded a future draft pick to obtain Ladygo's rights before the season, but he stated that it did not change his plans to play in Canada. He said, "I have not signed any contract with Pittsburgh and certainly not with Detroit. The Steelers exercised their option on me last May but I don't feel this entitles the club to my services. I want to play with Ottawa and intend to do so." During the 1955 season, he returned one interception 12 yards. In September, the Ottawa Citizen "put down Pete Ladygo as the outstanding Ottawa lineman." He recovered a fumble against the Hamilton Tiger-Cats, which was later converted into a score. In an "improved" Ottawa squad's rematch against Hamilton, Ladygo, Joe Moss, and Avatus Stone played 55 of the 60-minute game, and the Ottawa Citizen appraised that "they were all immense."

After his season in Canada, Ladygo returned to Keyser, West Virginia, with his wife Jackie, where he worked as a teacher and football coach at Bruce High School in Westernport, Maryland, and as an assistant football coach at Potomac State. He was inducted into the Potomac State College Athletic Hall of Fame in 1988. He died in Keyser on August 22, 2014.
