= John Alderton (American football) =

American football player (1931–2013)

No. 83, 75
- Position: End

Personal information
- Born: September 5, 1931; Cumberland, Maryland, U.S.
- Died: May 8, 2013 (aged 81); Cumberland, Maryland, U.S.
- Listed height: 6 ft 1 in (1.85 m)
- Listed weight: 200 lb (91 kg)

Career information
- High school: Fort Hill (Cumberland)
- College: Maryland (1948–1952)
- NFL draft: 1953: 7th round, 77th overall pick

Career history
- Pittsburgh Steelers (1953); Bolling Air Force Base (1954-1955); Calgary Stampeders (1956)
- Stats at Pro Football Reference

John Reber Alderton (September 5, 1931 – May 8, 2013) was an American professional football defensive lineman in the National Football League (NFL), a 1953 draft pick in the seventh round for the Pittsburgh Steelers. He was born in Cumberland, Maryland. He was team captain of the Maryland Terrapins during their undefeated 10–0 season in 1951 (#34). He later played football while serving in the United States Air Force at Bolling Air Force Base in 1954 and 1955. In 1956, he appeared in three games for the Calgary Stampeders of the Canadian Football League (CFL).
