= Bill Walker (gridiron football) =

American gridiron football and baseball player (1933–2019)

No. 75
- Positions: End, Punter

Personal information
- Born: November 5, 1933; Homeville, Pennsylvania, U.S.
- Died: July 26, 2019 (aged 85); West Chester, Pennsylvania, U.S.
- Listed height: 6 ft 0 in (1.83 m)
- Listed weight: 185 lb (84 kg)

Career information
- College: Maryland
- NFL draft: 1955: 8th round, 96th overall pick

Career history
- 1956–1958: Edmonton Eskimos

Awards and highlights
- Grey Cup champion (1956); NCAA champion (1953); 2× Second-team All-American (1954, 1955); 2× First-team All-ACC (1954, 1955); Second-team All-ACC (1953); 1955 All-ACC first team (baseball)

William J. Walker (November 5, 1933 – July 26, 2019) was an American former football and baseball player. He attended the University of Maryland, College Park where he played college football as an end and baseball as an outfielder. Wire services twice named Walker to All-America football second teams and he was also selected to an All-Atlantic Coast Conference (ACC) team three years. Walker was named to the All-ACC baseball team once as well. He was selected by the Detroit Lions in the eighth round of the 1955 NFL draft, but instead signed with the Edmonton Eskimos of the Western Interprovincial Football Union.

== Early life and college ==
A native of West Mifflin, Pennsylvania, Walker attended Munhall High School, where he played interscholastic football as an end. He then went on to college at the University of Maryland where he played on the varsity football team as an end from 1953 to 1955. During this time, the team was coached by Jim Tatum, who was the school's most successful coach of the modern era. In 1953, the Terrapins won the national championship, and Walker was named to the All-ACC second team. He was named "lineman of the week" for his performance in the 21–0 victory over Alabama that season.

In 1954, Walker led the team in receiving with 13 receptions for 209 yards. That year, he was named to the Associated Press All-America second team and the All-ACC first team. In 1955, he was a "key man on the undefeated Maryland team," and was named to the United Press All-America second team and the United Press All-ACC first team. The Atlantic Coast Sportswriters named him to the All-ACC second team. During his college career, Walker set the school career punting average at 41.8 yards per punt. That mark stood for 45 years until broken by Brooks Barnard in 2006. At Maryland, Walker also played on the baseball team as an outfielder. He was named to the All-ACC team in 1955. In 1956, he received the Bosey Berger Award for the team's most outstanding senior player.

He was a member of the Gamma Chi chapter of the Sigma Chi Fraternity at the University of Maryland. Fellow Sigma Chi brothers of Bill Walker at the University who were also All American football players were Chet Hanulak and Bob Pellegrini.

== Professional career ==
Walker was selected in the eighth round of the 1955 NFL draft by the Detroit Lions as the 96th overall pick. Walker instead signed with the Edmonton Eskimos of what was then the Western Interprovincial Football Union, which is now part of the Canadian Football League (CFL). Walker played three seasons for the Eskimos from 1956 to 1958.

He was inducted into the University of Maryland Athletic Hall of Fame in 2004. The 2009 edition of The USA Today College Football Encyclopedia named Walker, alongside Bernie Faloney, as Maryland's greatest two-way player since 1953 for his performance as an end on offense and defense, and as a punter.
