= Dave Cianelli =

American football player

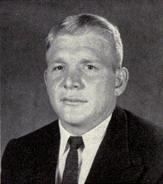
- Positions: , Fullback, Linebacker

Personal information
- Born: St. Cloud, Florida, U.S.
- Died: April 12, 2017

Career information
- High school: Hagerstown High School
- College: Maryland
- NFL draft: 1952: 6th round, 62nd overall pick

David Cianelli was a football player. The Dallas Texans drafted him in the sixth round of the 1952 NFL draft.

== Biography ==
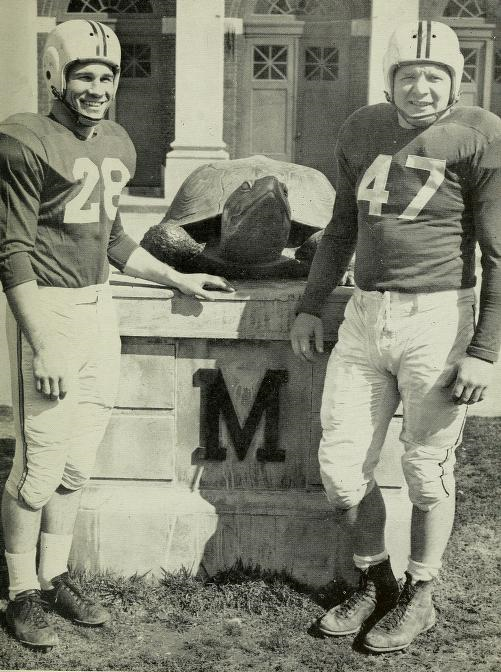
Cianelli (right) and Bob Ward in 1951

Dave Cianelli was born in St. Cloud, Florida and served in the United States Marine Corps during the Second World War. After the war, he attended the University of Maryland, where he played football as a linebacker and fullback. In 1951, he was named an honorable mention All-American. Cianelli served as team co-captain alongside Bob Ward during the Terrapins' 1952 Sugar Bowl upset victory over "General" Neyland's number-one ranked Tennessee.

Cianelli later worked in Washington, D.C. as a lobbyist for Bethlehem Steel. After retiring he lived in Allen, Texas.

Dave Cianelli died on April 12, 2017.

He is survived by five children, two sons and three daughters. His son, Dave Cianelli, is currently the Virginia Tech track & field coach, and was named the 2007 ACC Coach of the Year for both indoor and outdoor track.
