= Bob Morgan (gridiron football) =

American football player (1930–1991)

No. 74, 57, 61
- Position: Defensive tackle

Personal information
- Born: June 28, 1930; Freeport, Pennsylvania, U.S.
- Died: October 10, 1991 (aged 61); Westminster, Colorado, U.S.
- Listed height: 6 ft 0 in (1.83 m)
- Listed weight: 235 lb (107 kg)

Career information
- College: Maryland
- NFL draft: 1953: 8th round, 97th overall pick

Career history
- Chicago Cardinals (1954)*; Washington Redskins (1954); Calgary Stampeders (1955–1956)
- * Offseason or practice squad member only

Awards and highlights
- National champion (1953); Second-team All-ACC (1953)

Career NFL statistics
- Fumble recoveries: 3
- Stats at Pro Football Reference

Robert Francis Morgan (June 28, 1930 – October 10, 1991) was an American professional football offensive tackle in the National Football League (NFL). He played for the Washington Redskins.

== Formative years ==
Morgan was born in Freeport, Pennsylvania on June 28, 1930. He played college football and college lacrosse as a defenseman for the Maryland Terrapins at the University of Maryland.

== Professional football career ==
Morgan was drafted in the eighth round of the 1953 NFL draft by the Los Angeles Rams.

He subsequently played several years in the Canadian Football League (CFL) for the Calgary Stampeders.

== Hospitality career ==
Morgan was a fixture in Washington, D.C., as food and beverage manager for the Hotel Continental. He left that position to move west to Denver, taking over as food and beverage manager for the Denver Merchandise Mart, in 1977.

== Death ==
Morgan died in Westminster, Colorado on October 10, 1991.
