= Lloyd Colteryahn =

American football player (1931–2011)

No. 87
- Position: End

Personal information
- Born: August 26, 1931; Brentwood, Pennsylvania, U.S.
- Died: May 2, 2011 (aged 79); Dunedin, Florida, U.S.
- Listed height: 6 ft 2 in (1.88 m)
- Listed weight: 220 lb (100 kg)

Career information
- High school: Brentwood (Pittsburgh, Pennsylvania)
- College: Maryland
- NFL draft: 1953: 4th round, 43rd overall pick

Career history
- Baltimore Colts (1954–1956)

Career NFL statistics
- Receptions: 54
- Receiving yards: 664
- Touchdowns: 3
- Stats at Pro Football Reference

Lloyd Kenneth Colteryahn (August 26, 1931 – May 2, 2011) was an American professional football end. After playing college football for the Maryland Terrapins, he was selected by the Pittsburgh Steelers in the fourth round of the 1953 NFL draft. Colteryahn played professionally in the National Football League (NFL) for three seasons, from 1954 to 1956, with the Baltimore Colts. Colteryahn died in Dunedin, Florida, his winter home, on May 2, 2011, after a brief illness.
