= Dick Bielski =

American football player and coach (1932–2023)

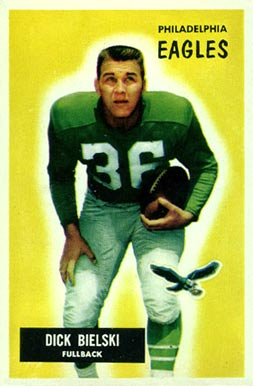
- Bielski on a 1955 Bowman football card

No. 36, 31
- Positions: Fullback, end, placekicker

Personal information
- Born: September 7, 1932; Baltimore, Maryland, U.S.
- Died: October 15, 2023 (aged 91); Towson, Maryland, U.S.
- Listed height: 6 ft 1 in (1.85 m)
- Listed weight: 224 lb (102 kg)

Career information
- High school: Patterson (Baltimore)
- College: Maryland (1951–1954)
- NFL draft: 1955: 1st round, 9th overall pick

Career history

Playing
- Philadelphia Eagles (1955–1959); Dallas Cowboys (1960–1961); Baltimore Colts (1962–1963)

Coaching
- Baltimore Colts (1964–1972) Wide receivers coach; Washington Redskins (1973–1976) Wide receivers coach; Baltimore Colts (1977–1981) Wide receivers coach; Washington Federals (1983–1984) Offensive coordinator

Awards and highlights
- Pro Bowl (1961); National champion (1953); First-team All-ACC (1954)

Career NFL statistics
- Rushing yards: 229
- Rushing average: 2.9
- Receptions: 107
- Receiving yards: 1,305
- Total touchdowns: 12
- Stats at Pro Football Reference

Richard Adam Bielski (/ˈbiːlskiː/ BEEL-skee; September 7, 1932 – October 15, 2023) was an American professional football player and coach. He played in the National Football League (NFL) for the Philadelphia Eagles, Dallas Cowboys, and Baltimore Colts. Bielski played college football at the University of Maryland.

== Early life ==
Bielski was named an All-Maryland Scholastic Association fullback in Patterson Park High School.

Bielski accepted a football scholarship with the University of Maryland, where he played as a fullback, linebacker, and placekicker.

In 1954 he was a preseason All-American candidate, but injuries affected his level of play during the season. Still, he was able to finish his college career averaging more than five yards per carry. At the end of the year, he was selected to play in the Chicago College All-Star Game, Senior Bowl, and the North-South Shrine Game, where he was voted the outstanding player of the game.

== Professional career ==
=== Philadelphia Eagles ===
Bielski was selected by the Philadelphia Eagles in the first round with the ninth overall pick of the 1955 NFL draft, becoming the highest-drafted running back from Maryland. During his first years, he made a team record two 50-yard field goals. In 1958, he was converted into an end. After the 1959 season, the Eagles left him off their list of players who were exempt from the 1960 NFL expansion draft.

=== Dallas Cowboys ===
Bielski was acquired by the Dallas Cowboys in the 1960 NFL expansion draft. He was involved in the record for the shortest touchdown pass in league history, after catching an Eddie LeBaron pass from the 2-inch line against the Redskins on October 9, 1960. He had 4 receptions for 38 yards.

In 1961 he earned his only Pro Bowl berth, with career highs of 26 receptions for 377 yards and three touchdowns. He also took over the placekicker duties from Allen Green for the final five games of the season.

During the 1962 offseason, needing help on defense, the Cowboys traded Bielski to the Baltimore Colts in a three-team deal. The Colts sent a third round draft pick (#33, used to select Mike Fracchia) to the St. Louis Cardinals, and in return the Cardinals sent safety/punter Jerry Norton to the Cowboys.

=== Baltimore Colts ===
In 1962, Bielski played as a placekicker and backup tight end. In 1963, he retired at the end of the season. In a nine-year career he had 107 receptions for 1,305 yards, 229 rushing yards and 12 touchdowns. He also kicked 58 extra points and 26 field goals.

== Coaching career ==
In 1964, he was hired by the Baltimore Colts as the wide receivers coach under head coach Don Shula. In 1973, he was named the wide receivers coach with the Washington Redskins. In 1977, he returned as the wide receivers coach for the Baltimore Colts. In 1983, he was hired as the offensive coordinator for the Washington Federals in the United States Football League. In 1984, he was the team's head coach for the final 17 games of the season, going 3–14.

== Personal life and death ==
Bielski married his high school sweetheart, Jo Bielski. They had been married 66 years at the time of her death in 2018.

Bielski lived in Ruxton, Maryland near his four children, Debbie, Ricky, Randy, and Jody, and lived with his granddaughter Niccole, her husband Spencer Dreiling and their son Mason.

Dick Bielski died on October 15, 2023, at the age of 91.
