= Chet Hanulak =

American football player (born 1933)

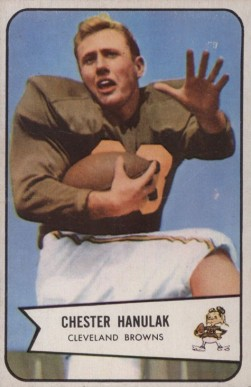
- Hanulak on a 1954 Bowman football card

No. 44
- Position: Running back

Personal information
- Born: March 28, 1933; Hackensack, New Jersey, U.S.
- Died: September 10, 2021 (aged 88); Salisbury, Maryland, U.S.
- Listed height: 5 ft 10 in (1.78 m)
- Listed weight: 185 lb (84 kg)

Career information
- High school: Hackensack
- College: University of Maryland
- NFL draft: 1954: 2nd round, 24th overall pick

Career history
- Cleveland Browns (1954,1957)

Awards and highlights
- NFL champion (1954); National champion (1953); First-team All-ACC (1953)

Career NFL statistics
- Rushing yards: 674
- Rush attempts: 184
- Rushing TDs: 7
- Military career
- Allegiance: United States
- Branch: United States Air Force
- Service years: 1955–1957
- Stats at Pro Football Reference

Other information
- Coaching career

Coaching career (HC unless noted)
- 1972-1978: Salisbury University; QB/RB

Chester Edward Delano Hanulak (March 28, 1933- September 10, 2021) was an American professional football player who won an NFL Championship playing running back for two seasons for the Cleveland Browns and a National Championship in 1953 with Maryland. He is one of few players to win a state championship at the high school level, a National championship at the college level and an NFL Championship at the professional level.

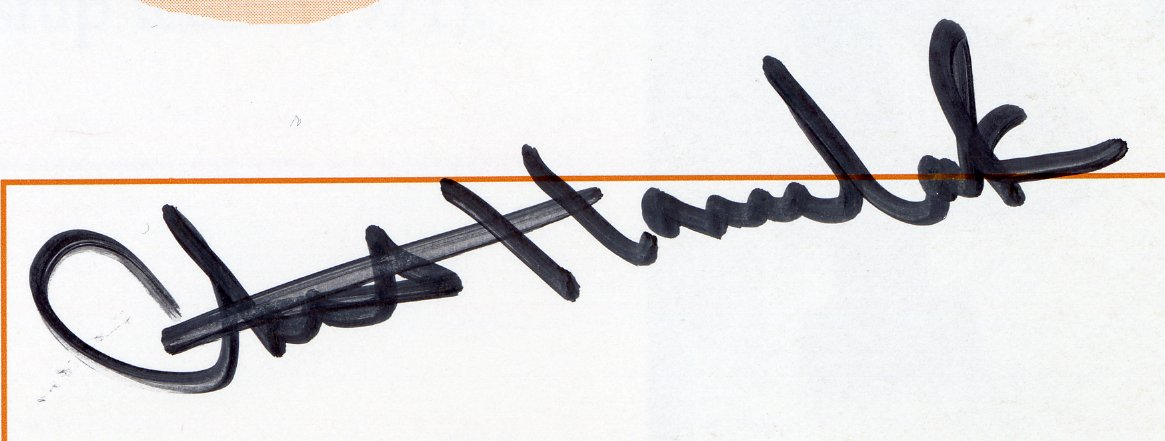

Hanulak played football at Hackensack High School where he was on the 1949 State Championship football team.

He was recruited to play on the Maryland Terrapins football team after his high school coach met the Maryland coach while both were attending a summer course. Nicknamed "the Jet", Hanulak played football at Maryland from 1950 to 1954, where he was an All-American and helped the team win the 1953 National Championship (and the 1951 National Championship by some accounts). He played in the team's win in the 1952 Sugar Bowl, when the #3 Terrapins upset the #1 Tennessee Volunteers. He still remains atop Maryland's all-time rushing list, averaging 8.13 yards a touch over his three seasons. He was also an All-Conference baseball player at Maryland in 1954.

He was drafted in the second round of the 1954 NFL draft by the Cleveland Browns (24th overall) and helped them to win the 1954 NFL Championship over the Detroit Lions, scoring the final touchdown in the game. He missed the 1955 and 1956 seasons serving in the Air Force, as was common at the time, as a Personnel Officer at Bolling Air Force Base in Washington, DC. He returned to the Browns for the 1957 seasons helping them to win the Eastern Conference and return to the NFL Championship Game, but this time they lost to the Lions.

He retired from football in 1958 and moved to Salisbury, MD to work for General Tire Co. He was a local entrepreneur and philanthropist. He also served as QB/RB coach for the Salisbury University Football Team from 1972 to 1978 and helped them with the 1976 Puerto Rico Bowl.

Hanulak was inducted into the Maryland Athletics Hall of Fame in 1994 and named an ACC Legend in 2012

He died on September 10, 2021.
