= Joe Moss =

American football player and coach (1930–2023)

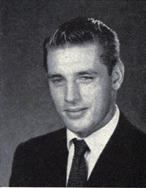
- Moss as a senior at Maryland

No. 72, 68
- Position: Offensive tackle

Personal information
- Born: April 9, 1930; Elkins, West Virginia, U.S.
- Died: January 31, 2023 (aged 92); Bluffton, South Carolina, U.S.
- Listed height: 6 ft 1 in (1.85 m)
- Listed weight: 221 lb (100 kg)

Career information
- High school: Ridgeley (Ridgeley, West Virginia)
- College: Maryland
- NFL draft: 1952: 14th round, 169th overall pick

Career history

Playing
- Washington Redskins (1952); Ottawa Rough Riders (1955)

Coaching
- Maryland (1956-1960) Assistant; Air Force (1961-1968) Assistant head coach; Philadelphia Eagles (1969–1972) Defensive line; Toronto Argonauts (1973–1974) Defensive coordinator; Toronto Argonauts (1974) Head coach; Toronto Argonauts (1975–1976) Defensive coordinator; Saskatchewan Roughriders (1977) Defensive backs; Ottawa Rough Riders (1978–1980) Defensive line; Ottawa Rough Riders (1981) Offensive line; University of Ottawa (1982) Head coach; Toronto Argonauts (1983–1984) Defensive coordinator; Ottawa Rough Riders (1985–1986) Head coach; Toronto Argonauts (1987–1989) Defensive line; Hamilton Tiger-Cats (1990–1993) Defensive line; Toronto Argonauts (1994–1995) Defensive line; Ottawa Rough Riders (1996) Defensive coordinator; Hamilton Tiger-Cats (1997) Defensive line; New Jersey Red Dogs (1998–1999) Assistant; Toronto Phantoms (2001) Defensive line/offensive line/special teams

Awards and highlights
- QUFL Coach of the Year (1982); Grey Cup champion (1983)

Career NFL statistics
- Games played: 12
- Games started: 12
- Fumble recoveries: 1
- Stats at Pro Football Reference

Joseph Charles Moss (April 19, 1930 – January 31, 2023) was an American gridiron football player and coach. He played college football at the University of Maryland and professional football in the National Football League (NFL) with the Washington Redskins. Moss served as head coach for the Toronto Argonauts and Ottawa Rough Riders in the Canadian Football League (CFL).

== Biography ==
A native of Elkins, West Virginia, Moss played college football at the University of Maryland and was drafted in the fourteenth round of the 1952 NFL draft by the Los Angeles Rams. He was traded to the Washington Redskins on July 11, 1952, for Nick Bolkovac and a sixth-round draft pick.

After playing one season in the National Football League with the Washington Redskins, Moss joined the United States Air Force and was stationed at Bolling Air Force Base in Washington, D.C., where he played for the base football team. After graduating from University of Maryland as a cadet in the Air Force Reserve Officers Training Corps, he was commissioned as a second lieutenant in the United States Air Force Reserves on February 1, 1953.

In 1956, Moss became an assistant coach at his alma mater, Maryland. From 1961 to 1968, Moss was Ben Martin's chief assistant at the United States Air Force Academy. From 1969 to 1972 he was the defensive line coach for the Philadelphia Eagles. In 1973, Moss became the defensive coordinator for the Toronto Argonauts of the Canadian Football League. Moss was promoted to head coach during the 1974 season after the Argos got off to a 3–4 start. Toronto would go 3–5–1 under Moss and he was replaced as head coach by Russ Jackson, but remained as defensive coordinator.

After one season as the Saskatchewan Roughriders defensive backs coach, Moss became head coach of the Ottawa Gee-Gees football team for one year, 1982. Moss won the Ontario-Quebec University Football League coach of the year award in 1982. Moss returned to the Argonauts as defensive coordinator in 1983 and helped coach the team to victory in the 71st Grey Cup.

On December 18, 1984, Moss was named head coach of the Ottawa Rough Riders. Moss coached the Riders to a 7–9 record and a playoff berth in his first season as head coach. He was fired during his second season after losing ten of eleven games. He recorded a 10–19 mark during his tenure at the helm of the Rough Riders.

After his firing, Moss served as an assistant with the Toronto Argonauts, Hamilton Tiger-Cats, and Ottawa Rough Riders in the CFL, and the New Jersey Red Dogs and Toronto Phantoms of the Arena Football League. He has also scouted for the Tiger-Cats.

Moss retired from the air force reserves as a lieutenant colonel. He died on January 31, 2023, at the age of 92.
