= List of Maryland Terrapins men's basketball seasons =

The Maryland Terrapins men's college basketball team competes in the National Collegiate Athletic Association's (NCAA) Division I, representing the University of Maryland in the Big Ten Conference. Maryland has played its home games at Xfinity Center in College Park, Maryland since its opening in 2002.

== Seasons ==
Statistics overview
Season	Coach	Overall	Conference	Standing	Postseason
No Coach (Independent) (1904–1919)
1904–05	No coach	0–2			
1910–11	No coach	3–9			
1912–13	No coach	3–6			
1913–14	No coach	0–16			
1918–19	No coach	1–5			
Burton Shipley (Southern Conference) (1923–1947)
1923–24	Burton Shipley	5–7	1–2	11th	
1924–25	Burton Shipley	12–5	3–1	4th	
1925–26	Burton Shipley	14–3	7–1	4th	
1926–27	Burton Shipley	10–10	6–4	9th	
1927–28	Burton Shipley	14–4	8–1	4th	
1928–29	Burton Shipley	7–9	2–5	21st	
1929–30	Burton Shipley	16–6	9–5	10th	
1930–31	Burton Shipley	18–4	8–1	2nd	
1931–32	Burton Shipley	16–4	9–1	T–1st	
1932–33	Burton Shipley	11–9	7–3	3rd	
1933–34	Burton Shipley	11–8	6–1	3rd	
1934–35	Burton Shipley	8–10	4–3	5th	
1935–36	Burton Shipley	14–6	4–3	4th	
1936–37	Burton Shipley	8–12	5–8	T–10th	
1937–38	Burton Shipley	15–9	6–4	7th	
1938–39	Burton Shipley	15–9	8–3	T–2nd	
1939–40	Burton Shipley	14–9	7–5	5th	
1940–41	Burton Shipley	1–21	0–13	15th	
1941–42	Burton Shipley	7–15	3–8	T–12th	
1942–43	Burton Shipley	8–8	5–5	9th	
1943–44	Burton Shipley	4–14	2–1	4th	
1944–45	Burton Shipley	2–14	2–5	9th	
1945–46	Burton Shipley	9–12	5–4	5th	
1946–47	Burton Shipley	14–10	9–5	5th	
Flucie Stewart (Southern Conference) (1947–1950)
1947–48	Flucie Stewart	11–14	9–6	4th	
1948–49	Flucie Stewart	9–17	7–7	8th	
1949–50	Flucie Stewart	7–18	5–13	13th	
Bud Millikan (Southern Conference) (1950–1953)
1950–51	Bud Millikan	15–10	11–8	8th	
1951–52	Bud Millikan	13–9	9–5	T–6th	
1952–53	Bud Millikan	15–8	12–3	T–2nd	
Bud Millikan (Atlantic Coast Conference) (1953–1967)
1953–54	Bud Millikan	23–7	7–2	2nd	
1954–55	Bud Millikan	17–7	10–4	3rd	
1955–56	Bud Millikan	14–10	7–7	5th	
1956–57	Bud Millikan	16–10	9–5	2nd	
1957–58	Bud Millikan	22–7	9–5	4th	NCAA University Division Sweet Sixteen
1958–59	Bud Millikan	10–13	7–7	T–3rd	
1959–60	Bud Millikan	15–8	9–5	3rd	
1960–61	Bud Millikan	14–12	6–8	5th	
1961–62	Bud Millikan	8–17	3–11	7th	
1962–63	Bud Millikan	8–13	4–10	T–6th	
1963–64	Bud Millikan	9–17	5–9	6th	
1964–65	Bud Millikan	18–8	10–4	T–2nd	
1965–66	Bud Millikan	14–11	7–7	5th	
1966–67	Bud Millikan	11–14	4–10	7th	
Frank Fellows (Atlantic Coast Conference) (1967–1969)
1967–68	Frank Fellows	8–16	4–10	6th	
1968–69	Frank Fellows	8–18	2–12	T–7th	
Lefty Driesell (Atlantic Coast Conference) (1969–1986)
1969–70	Lefty Driesell	13–13	5–9	6th	
1970–71	Lefty Driesell	14–12	5–9	T–6th	
1971–72	Lefty Driesell	27–5	8–4	3rd	NIT Champion
1972–73	Lefty Driesell	23–7	7–5	T–2nd	NCAA University Division Elite Eight
1973–74	Lefty Driesell	23–5	9–3	T–2nd	
1974–75	Lefty Driesell	24–5	10–2	1st	NCAA Division I Elite Eight
1975–76	Lefty Driesell	22–6	7–5	T–2nd	
1976–77	Lefty Driesell	19–8	7–5	4th	
1977–78	Lefty Driesell	15–13	3–9	T–6th	
1978–79	Lefty Driesell	19–11	6–6	4th	NIT second round
1979–80	Lefty Driesell	24–7	11–3	1st	NCAA Division I Sweet Sixteen
1980–81	Lefty Driesell	21–10	8–6	4th	NCAA Division I second round
1981–82	Lefty Driesell	16–13	5–9	5th	NIT second round
1982–83	Lefty Driesell	20–10	8–6	T–3rd	NCAA Division I second round
1983–84	Lefty Driesell	24–8	9–5	2nd	NCAA Division I Sweet Sixteen
1984–85	Lefty Driesell	25–12	8–6	T–4th	NCAA Division I Sweet Sixteen
1985–86	Lefty Driesell	19–14	6–8	6th	NCAA Division I second round
Bob Wade (Atlantic Coast Conference) (1986–1989)
1986–87	Bob Wade	9–17	0–14	8th	
1987–88	Bob Wade	18–13^{[Note A]}	6–8	5th	NCAA Division I second round
1988–89	Bob Wade	9–20	1–13	8th	
Gary Williams (Atlantic Coast Conference) (1989–2011)
1989–90	Gary Williams	19–14	6–8	T–5th	NIT second round
1990–91	Gary Williams	16–12	5–9	T–7th	
1991–92	Gary Williams	14–15	5–11	8th	
1992–93	Gary Williams	12–16	2–14	8th	
1993–94	Gary Williams	18–12	8–8	T–4th	NCAA Division I Sweet Sixteen
1994–95	Gary Williams	26–8	12–4	T–1st	NCAA Division I Sweet Sixteen
1995–96	Gary Williams	17–13	8–8	T–4th	NCAA Division I first round
1996–97	Gary Williams	21–11	9–7	T–4th	NCAA Division I first round
1997–98	Gary Williams	21–11	10–6	3rd	NCAA Division I Sweet Sixteen
1998–99	Gary Williams	28–6	13–3	2nd	NCAA Division I Sweet Sixteen
1999–00	Gary Williams	25–10	11–5	2nd	NCAA Division I second round
2000–01	Gary Williams	25–11	10–6	3rd	NCAA Division I Final Four
2001–02	Gary Williams	32–4	15–1	1st	NCAA Division I Champion
2002–03	Gary Williams	21–10	11–5	T–2nd	NCAA Division I Sweet Sixteen
2003–04	Gary Williams	20–12	7–9	T–6th	NCAA Division I second round
2004–05	Gary Williams	19–13	7–9	T–6th	NIT Semifinal
2005–06	Gary Williams	19–13	8–8	6th	NIT first round
2006–07	Gary Williams	25–9	10–6	T–3rd	NCAA Division I second round
2007–08	Gary Williams	19–15	8–8	T–5th	NIT second round
2008–09	Gary Williams	21–14	7–9	T–7th	NCAA Division I second round
2009–10	Gary Williams	24–9	13–3	T–1st	NCAA Division I second round
2010–11	Gary Williams	19–14	7–9	T–7th	
Mark Turgeon (Atlantic Coast Conference) (2011–2014)
2011–12	Mark Turgeon	17–15	6–10	8th	
2012–13	Mark Turgeon	25–13	8–10	7th	NIT Semifinal
2013–14	Mark Turgeon	17–15	9–9	T–7th	
Mark Turgeon (Big Ten Conference) (2014–2021)
2014–15	Mark Turgeon	28–7	14–4	2nd	NCAA Division I second round
2015–16	Mark Turgeon	27–9	12–6	T–3rd	NCAA Division I Sweet Sixteen
2016–17	Mark Turgeon	24–9	12–6	T–2nd	NCAA Division I first round
2017–18	Mark Turgeon	19–13	8–10	8th	
2018–19	Mark Turgeon	23–11	13–7	5th	NCAA Division I second round
2019–20	Mark Turgeon	24–7	14–6	T–1st	No postseason held
2020–21	Mark Turgeon	17–14	9–11	T–8th	NCAA Division I second round
2021–22	Mark Turgeon/Danny Manning (interim)	15–17	7–13	T–10th	
Kevin Willard (Big Ten Conference) (2022–2025)
2022–23	Kevin Willard	22–13	11–9	T–5th	NCAA Division I second round
2023–24	Kevin Willard	16–17	7–13	12th	
2024–25	Kevin Willard	27–9	14–6	2nd	NCAA Division I Sweet Sixteen
Buzz Williams (Big Ten Conference) (2025–present)
2025–26	Buzz Williams	12–21	4–16	17th	
Total:		1,711–1,140			
National champion Postseason invitational champion Conference regular season champion Conference regular season and conference tournament champion Division regular season champion Division regular season and conference tournament champion Conference tournament champion

^A. 1988 NCAA Tournament appearance was vacated due to ineligible players; official record is 17–12.
