= List of Maryland Terrapins men's basketball head coaches =

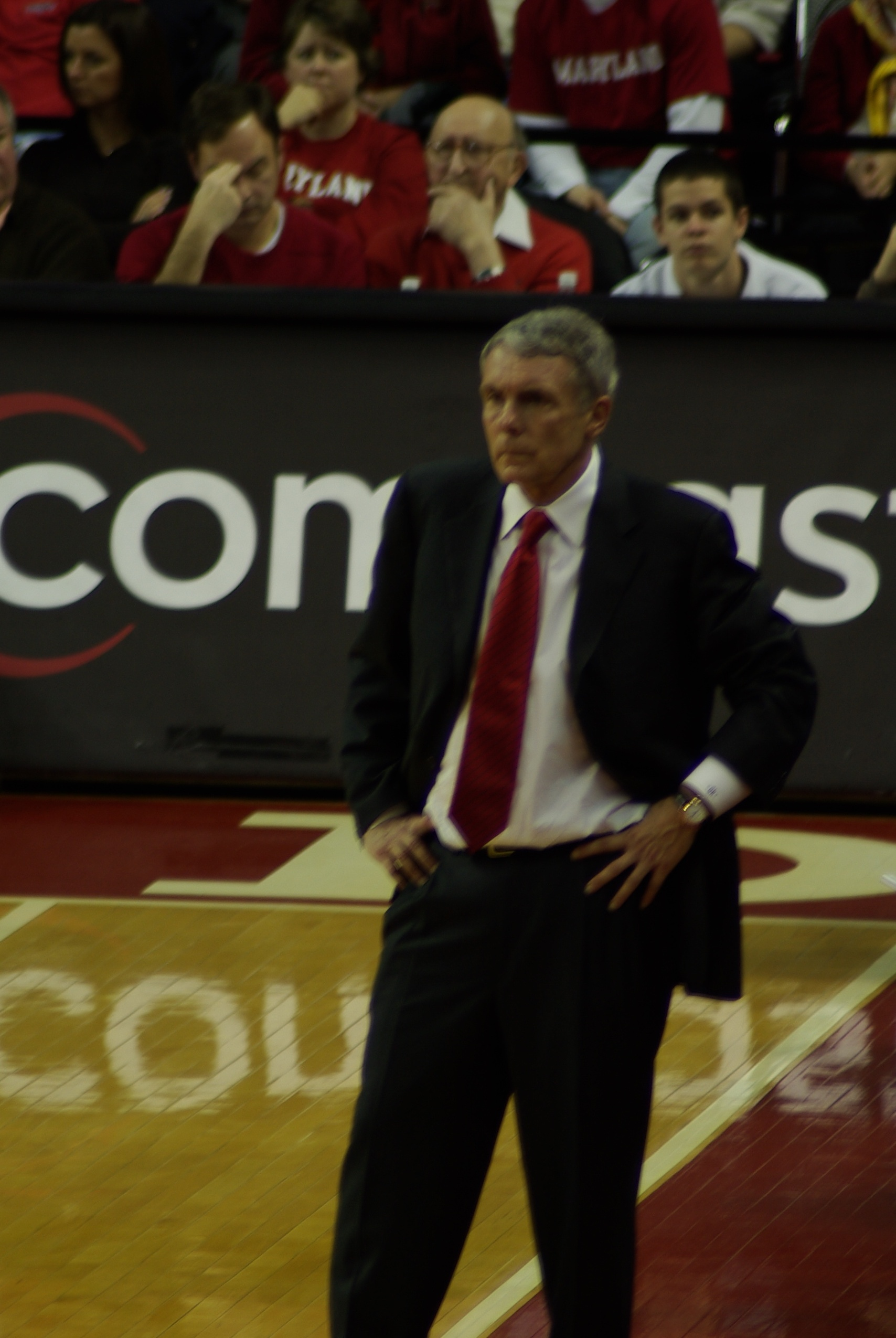
Gary Williams led Maryland to a national championship in 2002.

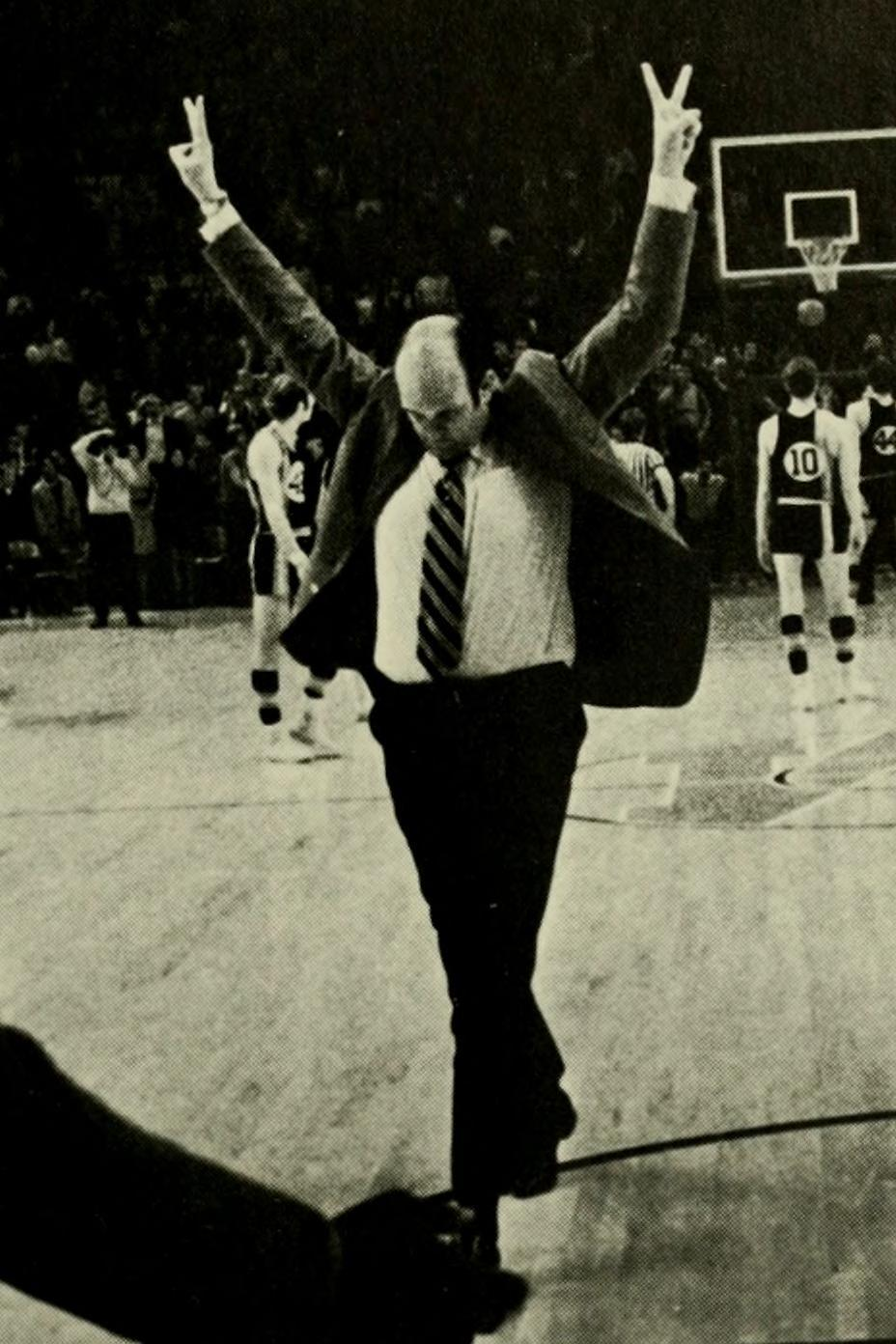
Hall of famer Charles "Lefty" Driesell was Maryland's head coach from 1969-1986.

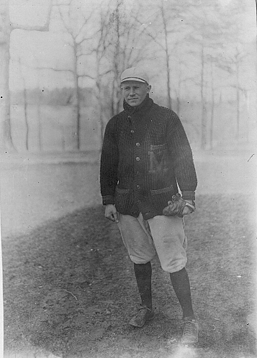
Howard Burton Shipley was Maryland's first men's basketball head coach.

The University of Maryland men's basketball team has had eleven head coaches in program history, including Naismith Basketball Hall of Fame members Gary Williams and Lefty Driesell. Maryland's longest tenured coach is H. Burton Shipley, who coached from 1923–1946. The team's current head coach is Buzz Williams who was recently hired on April 1, 2025. Prior to that coach Kevin Willard served as head coach since 2022, before leaving after the 2025 NCAA Tournament to join Villanova.

== All-time Head Coaches ==
Key
OR	Overall record
OW%	Overall Win Percentage
CR	Conference record
CW%	Conference Win Percentage
RC	Regular season Conference Championship
TC	Conference Tournament Championship
NIT	National Invitation Tournament Appearance
NCAA	NCAA tournament Appearance
FF	NCAA final Four
NC	NCAA Tournament Championship
*	Elected into the College Basketball Hall of Fame
†	Elected into the Basketball Hall of Fame

Years	Coach	Seasons	OR	OW%	CR	CW%	RC	TC	NIT	NCAA	FF	NC	Awards
1923–1947	H. Burton Shipley	24	253–218	.537	124–91 (SoCon)	.577	1	1	0	0	0	0	
1947–1950	Flucie Stewart	3	27–50	.351	22–27 (SoCon)	.468	0	0	0	0	0	0	
1950–1967	Bud Millikan	17	243–182	.572	130–109 (SoCon/ACC)	.544	0	1	0	1	0	0	
1967–1969	Frank Fellows	2	16–34	.320	6–22 (ACC)	.214	0	0	0	0	0	0	
1969–1986	Lefty Driesell†*	17	348–159	.686	122–100 (ACC)	.550	2	1	1	8	0	0	ACC COY (1975, 1980), NCAA Award of Valor (1974)
1986–1989	Bob Wade	3	36–50	.419	7–35 (ACC)	.167	0	0	0	1	0	0	
1989–2011	Gary Williams†*	22	461–252	.647	194–157 (ACC)	.553	3	1	4	14	2	1	ACC COY (2002, 2010)
2011–2021	Mark Turgeon (Note: Maryland and Mark Turgeon mutually agreed to part ways part of the way through the 2021–22 season, with Danny Manning replacing him on an interim basis.)	10	226–116	.661	105–78 (ACC/B1G)	.574	1	0	1	5	0	0	B1G COY (2015)
2021–2022	Danny Manning (interim)	1	10–14	.417	7–13 (B1G)	.350	0	0	0	0	0	0	
2022–2025	Kevin Willard	3	65-39	.625	32-28 (B1G)	.533	0	0	0	1	0	0	
2025–Present	Buzz Williams	1	12-21	.364	4-16 (B1G)	.200	0	0	0	0	0	0	
Totals	11 coaches	102	1678–1109	.602	746–659	.531	7	4	6	30	2	1	
