= Joe Harrington (basketball) =

American basketball coach (born 1945)

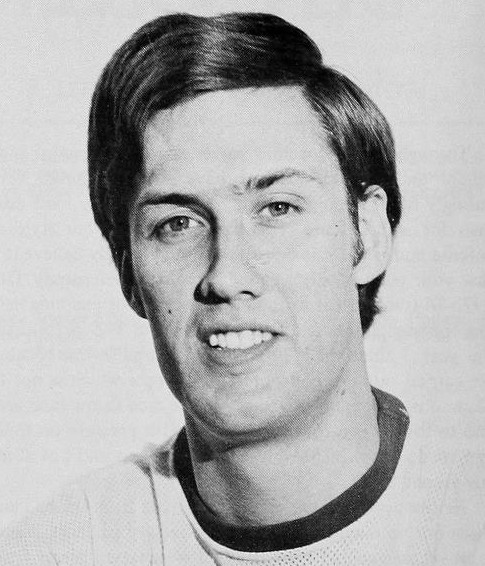
- Harrington, circa 1976

Biographical details
- Born: December 28, 1945 (age 80); Phippsburg, Maine, U.S.

Playing career
- 1965–1967: Maryland

Coaching career (HC unless noted)
- 1969–1979: Maryland (assistant)
- 1979–1980: Hofstra
- 1980–1987: George Mason
- 1987–1990: Long Beach State
- 1990–1996: Colorado
- 1998–2000: Toronto Raptors (assistant)

Administrative career (AD unless noted)
- 2008–2010: Maryland (dir. MBBSS)

Head coaching record
- Overall: 251–220
- Tournaments: 6–5 (NIT)

Accomplishments and honors

Awards
- ECAC South Coach of the Year (1984)

Joe Harrington (born December 28, 1945) is an American basketball coach. He last served as the Director of Men's Basketball Student Services at the Maryland. Harrington served as the head coach at Hofstra University, George Mason University, California State University, Long Beach, and the University of Colorado. He was an assistant coach with the Toronto Raptors in the National Basketball Association.

== Biography ==
Harrington was the star of Morse High School's back-to-back state championship teams in 1962–63. He attended the University of Maryland, where he played college basketball under Maryland head coach Bud Millikan and alongside point guard Gary Williams. The Boston Celtics selected Harrington in the 1967 NBA draft.

Harrington served as the head coach at Hofstra for the 1979–80 season. From 1980 to 1986, he coached at George Mason, where he compiled a 112–85 record. From 1987 to 1990, he coached at Long Beach State, where he compiled a 53–36 record. From 1990 to 1996, he served as the head coach at Colorado, where he compiled a 72–85 record. Harrington served as a manager for the US national team in the 1990 FIBA World Championship, which won the bronze medal. He worked as an assistant coach for the Toronto Raptors from 1998 to 2000. In November 2008, he joined former teammate Gary Williams' coaching staff at their alma mater, Maryland, as the Director of Men's Basketball Student Services.

Harrington was featured on Maine Cabin Masters, Season 10, Episode 10, air date March 3, 2025, "Legacy Cabin for a Basketball Legend". The Cabin Masters built a camp for Harrington on oceanside property in Phippsburg which had been purchased by Harrington's father in the 1950s.

...

== Head coaching record ==
Record table
Season	Team	Overall	Conference	Standing	Postseason
Hofstra Flying Dutchmen (East Coast Conference) (1979–1980)
1979–80	Hofstra	14–14	6–5	4th (East)	
Hofstra:		14–14	6–5		
George Mason Patriots (ECAC South / Colonial Athletic Association) (1980–1987)
1980–81	George Mason	10–16			
1981–82	George Mason	13–14	2–6	8th	
1982–83	George Mason	15–12	3–6	4th	
1983–84	George Mason	21–7	5–5	T–4th	
1984–85	George Mason	18–11	10–4	3rd	
1985–86	George Mason	20–12	10–4	3rd	NIT Second Round
1986–87	George Mason	15–13	7–7	5th	
George Mason:		122–85			
Long Beach State 49ers (Pacific Coast Athletic Association / Big West Conference) (1987–1990)
1987–88	Long Beach State	17–12	11–7	4th	NIT First Round
1988–89	Long Beach State	13–15	10–8	T–4th	
1989–90	Long Beach State	23–9	12–6	4th	NIT Second Round
Long Beach State:		53–36	33–21		
Colorado Buffaloes (Big Eight Conference) (1990–1996)
1990–91	Colorado	19–14	5–9	T–6th	NIT Third Place
1991–92	Colorado	13–15	4–10	8th	
1992–93	Colorado	10–17	2–12	8th	
1993–94	Colorado	10–17	2–12	8th	
1994–95	Colorado	15–13	5–9	6th	NIT First Round
1995–96	Colorado	5–9	0–3		
Colorado:		72–85	18–55		
Total:		251–220			
