= Frank Fellows =

Frank Fellows may refer to:

- Frank Fellows (basketball), head coach of the Maryland Terrapins men's basketball
- Frank Fellows (politician) (1889–1951), U.S. Representative from Maine
