= Al Bunge =

American basketball player (1937–2019)

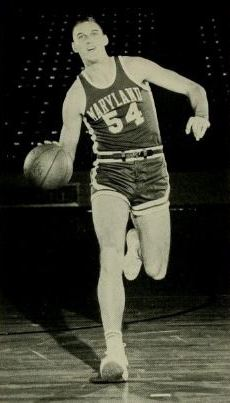
- Bunge from the 1960 Terrapin

Personal information
- Born: November 24, 1937 Delanco Township, New Jersey
- Died: November 26, 2019 Bartlesville, Oklahoma
- Listed height: 6 ft 8 in (2.03 m)
- Listed weight: 215 lb (98 kg)

Career information
- High school: Palmyra, (Palmyra, New Jersey)
- College: Maryland (1957–1960)
- NBA draft: 1960: 1st round, 7th overall pick
- Drafted by: Philadelphia Warriors
- Position: Center
- Number: 54

Career history
- 1960–1962: Phillips 66ers

Career highlights
- First-team All-ACC (1960)
- Stats at Basketball Reference

Allan J. Bunge (November 24, 1937 – November 26, 2019) is a former National Basketball Association (NBA) first round draft pick (seventh pick overall) of the Philadelphia Warriors in the 1960 NBA draft. Bunge led the Maryland Terrapins to the NCAA tournament in 1958. Bunge's career was interrupted, and his entire life impacted, by flareups of ulcerative colitis that was discovered during his freshman year at Maryland.

== Early life ==
Born in Delanco Township, New Jersey, Bunge played football, basketball and baseball at Palmyra High School. He was high school teammates with future Wake Forest Hall of Fame inductee Dave Wiedeman. It was assumed that Wiedeman was going to attend Maryland with Bunge, before eventually enrolling at Atlantic Coast Conference rival Wake Forest University.

== College career ==
Bunge had ties to all three major sports at Maryland. Bunge played basketball for Coach Bud Millikan at Maryland. He was also recruited to play football for Jim Tatum at Maryland, but did not play football. Bunge was initially a two-sport athlete at Maryland, as he pitched on the 1958 Maryland baseball team, along with his basketball role.

In basketball, Bunge averaged a double-double of 12.4 points and 10.6 rebounds over his 75-game Maryland basketball career. His 10.6 rebound career average is the fourth-highest in Maryland history and his 12.6 rebound average in 1959–1960 ranks third in Maryland history.

Bunge averaged 10.1 points and 9.1 rebounds as a sophomore in 1957–1958 as Maryland was 22–7, winning their first ACC tournament championship and qualifying for the NCAA tournament for the first time in school history.

In the 1958 ACC tournament on March 6–8, 1958, Maryland first defeated Virginia 70–66, then defeated sixth-ranked Duke 71–65 in overtime. In the Final, Maryland defeated defending National Champion, #13 ranked North Carolina 86–74 to capture the ACC Tournament. Of the ACC Tournament championship, Bunge later said, “It was a big deal. ‘Whoa, Tobacco Road, maybe it's not what it used to be."

In the 1958 NCAA University Division basketball tournament, Maryland Won their First round (86–63) against Boston College, then lost in the East Regional semifinal (71–67) versus the Temple Owls. They then won the East Regional Third Place game (59–55) versus the Manhattan Jaspers to close out the season. (Third-place games are no longer played in NCAA tournaments).

Bunge was immediately hospitalized after the Terrapins' loss to Temple, missing the pep rally held for the Terrapins, and his weight had fallen to well under 200 pounds (91 kg). Bunge suffered from ulcerative colitis that was first discovered during his freshman year at Maryland, and he had lost 55 pounds at that time. He would experience fatigue, drastic weight loss, anemia and had to endure regular transfusions. "When I came back for my sophomore year, I couldn't run up and down the floor" he said. "I had a transfusion and that made me better for most of the year. When we got to the end of the year, my anemia started coming back." Of the Temple game he said, “I could hardly play, I didn't even play half the game. If I had been healthy, we would’ve won.”

As a junior in 1958–58, Bunge averaged 11.1 points and 10.5 rebounds as Maryland finished 10–13.

Maryland went 15-8 (9–3 in the ACC), as Bunge lead the team with both 16.7 points and 12.6 rebounds as a senior in 1959–60.

Included in Bunge's career were some record setting games: On February 26, 1958, he had 22 rebounds against Georgetown, setting the school record. On January 4, 1960, Bunge scored 43 points vs. Yale, a school record that stood until Ernie Graham scored 44 against North Carolina State in 1978.

Following the 1959–60 collegiate season, Bunge was selected to play in the Shrine East-West basketball game at Madison Square Garden. He and East teammates Lenny Wilkens, Jerry West and Tom Stith played against the West squad featuring and future NBA Hall of Famer Oscar Robertson, among others. Bunge guarded Robertson in the game. "It was a thrill," he said about of playing against Robertson. "I think he had 11 or 12 points, but they weren't all against me." Bunge earned the Most Valuable Defensive Player Award in the game.

Bunge also received an invitation to the 1960 U.S. Olympic Trials for basketball. He did not make the team, which, led by Robertson, won the gold medal at the 1960 Olympic Games. The 1960 Olympic trials had the AAU and NCAA wrestling for control of USA Basketball. As a result, the composition of the team represented an uneasy truce. The final team was made up of seven collegiate stars, four AAU players (Burdette Haldorson of the Phillips 66ers) and one representative of the US Armed Forces (guard Adrian Smith). This compromise meant that many top college players were left off the team, including Bunge and Future Hall of Famers Satch Sanders, John Havlicek and Lenny Wilkens.

== Professional career ==
Before the 1960 NBA draft, Bunge was contacted by the New York Knicks, Syracuse Nationals, Fort Wayne Pistons and Philadelphia Warriors, among others.

On April 11, 1960, the Philadelphia Warriors drafted Bunge with the seventh pick in the first round of the draft, claiming territorial rights. The Warriors had second-year player Wilt Chamberlain. Hall of Fame players Oscar Robertson (#1), Jerry West (#2), and Lenny Wilkens (#6) were selected just ahead of Bunge. Hall of Famer Satch Sanders was taken with the next pick at #8.

Also drafted in the 1960 draft were Bunge's Maryland Teammates Charlie McNeil (5th round, #35 / New York Knicks) and Jerry Bechtle (15th round, #91 / New York Knicks).

In the era before sports agents, Bunge had a contract dispute with the Warriors' President and General Manager Eddie Gottlieb. The issue was Bunge's desire for the Warriors to pay for his health insurance, which he needed due to his ulcerative colitis, anemia and related health issues.

Ultimately, Bunge and another 1960 first round pick, Lee Shaffer, signed with Amateur Athletic Union (AAU) teams, bypassing the NBA. Bunge joined Phillips Petroleum and played 1960–62 for the Phillips 66ers out of Bartlesville, Oklahoma. Maryland teammate Charlie McNeil also signed with the 66ers. In this era, the NBA did not pay well and offered players no health insurance benefits. For many college graduates, AAU basketball, aligned with a job and insurance, was the better option and Bunge took this route.

Bunge was limited by his health. During the 1961–62 season, the 66ers were 45–8 and won the AAU National Championship, beating the Denver D-C Truckers, 70–59, in Denver, Colorado. Bunge retired from playing after the season.

On September 1, 1963, the San Francisco Warriors renounced his draft rights.

== Personal life ==
Bunge was married to Barbara and resided in the Bartlesville, Oklahoma area for many years. He worked for Phillips Petroleum for over 30 years, after working and playing for their AAU team, the Phillips 66ers.

Bunge was a youth league softball coach for many years.

Bunge's daughter, Tracy Bunge, played softball at the University of Kansas, graduating in 1986. Tracy Bunge was inducted to both the Kansas University Athletics Hall of Fame and the Kansas Sports Hall of Fame and had her number retired at Kansas University. Tracy Bunge was a longtime Head Coach of the University of Kansas Softball program.

Bunge's daughter, Kim Bunge Sanchez, played college basketball for the University of Arkansas from 1980 to 1982.

Bunge's grandson, Michael Sanchez, was a 6'8" forward for the University of Arkansas from 2007 to 2012.

Bunge's granddaughter, Krista Sanchez, was a 6'1" basketball player at the University of Oklahoma from 2003 to 2007.

Al Bunge died on November 26, 2019, at the age of 82.

== Honors ==
In 2009, Bunge was honored as a 2009 Atlantic Coast Conference Basketball Tournament Legend, joining 10 other former ACC basketball players and one coach representing the Legends. The 2009 Legends were honored at the 57th Annual Atlantic Coast Conference Basketball Tournament on March 12–15, 2009 in Atlanta.

On October 21, 2016, Bunge was inducted into the University of Maryland Athletics Hall of Fame.

In January 2018, the 1958 NCAA Tournament Team was honored by Maryland at halftime of their game vs. the Iowa Hawkeyes, with Bunge in attendance.
