= Flucie Stewart =

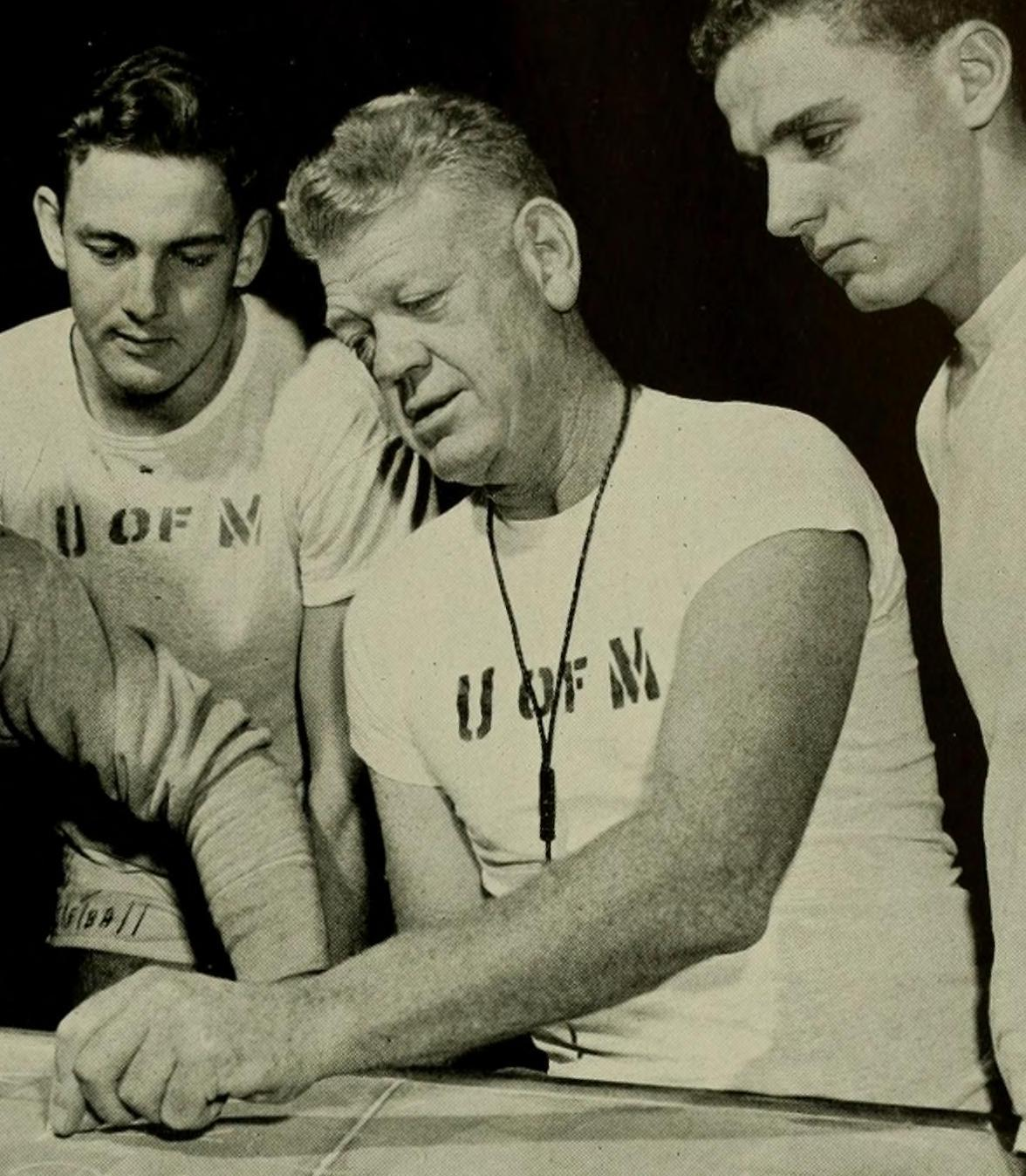
- Stewart at Maryland in 1948

Biographical details
- Born: August 5, 1906; Strawn, Texas, U.S.
- Died: November 17, 1956 (aged 50); Greenville, South Carolina, U.S.

Playing career

Football
- 1929–1931: Furman
- Position: End

Coaching career (HC unless noted)

Football
- 1934: Furman (freshmen)
- 1935–1938: Appalachian State (assistant)
- 1939: Appalachian State
- 1940: Delaware (assistant)
- 1941: Tampa
- 1946: Appalachian State
- 1947–1948: Maryland (assistant)

Basketball
- 1933–1935: Furman
- 1935–1940: Appalachian State
- 1940–1941: Delaware
- 1946–1947: Appalachian State
- 1947–1950: Maryland

Administrative career (AD unless noted)
- 1939–1940: Appalachian State

Head coaching record
- Overall: 18–8–2 (football); 113–116 (basketball)

Accomplishments and honors

Championships
- Football; 1 North State (1939); Basketball; 1 North State (1940)

Awards
- Basketball; 2× North State Coach of the Year (1940, 1947)

Alfred Lloyd' "Flucie" Stewart (August 5, 1906 – November 17, 1956) was an American college basketball and college football coach. He served as the head football and basketball coach for the Appalachian State Mountaineers located in the town of Boone in Watauga County, North Carolina. Stewart also was head basketball coach at Furman University for two years.

A native of Strawn, Texas, Stewart attended Furman University where he played as an end on the football team from 1929 to 1930. He joined the Appalachian State football staff in 1935 as an assistant coach. By 1940, he had taken over as athletic director. In 1941, he served as head football coach at Tampa for one season before resigning.

Stewart became Maryland head basketball coach in 1947, after the longstanding tenure of Burton Shipley. He was also a member of Jim Tatum's football staff as an assistant coach. Stewart's basketball teams were not successful, however, and after three losing seasons, was replaced by Bud Millikan. He also worked as an associate professor of physical education.

Stewart died on November 17, 1956, in Greenville, South Carolina, succumbing to a two-year illness.

== Head coaching record ==
=== Football ===
Year	Team	Overall	Conference	Standing	Bowl/playoffs
Appalachian State Mountaineers (North State Conference) (1939)
1939	Appalachian State	7–1–2	3–0–1	T–1st	
Tampa Spartans (Southern Intercollegiate Athletic Association) (1941)
1941	Tampa	5–4	2–2	T–14th	
Tampa:		5–4	2–2		
Appalachian State Mountaineers (North State Conference) (1946)
1946	Appalachian State	6–3	4–1	2nd	
Appalachian State:		13–4–2	7–1–1		
Total:		18–8–2			
National championship Conference title Conference division title or championship game berth

=== Basketball ===
Record table
Season	Team	Overall	Conference	Standing	Postseason
Furman Paladins (Southern Conference) (1933–1935)
1933–34	Furman	3–12			
1934–35	Furman	9–8			
Furman:		12–20			
Appalachian State Mountaineers (North State Conference) (1935–1940)
1935–36	Appalachian State	5–14			
1936–37	Appalachian State	10–7			
1937–38	Appalachian State	11–6			
1938–39	Appalachian State	11–5			
1939–40	Appalachian State	19–3			
Delaware Fightin' Blue Hens (Mason-Dixon Conference) (1940–1941)
1940–41	Delaware	7–9	2–3		
Delaware:		7–9	2–3		
Appalachian State Mountaineers (North State Conference) (1946–1947)
1946–47	Appalachian State	11–3			
Appalachian State:		67–38	48–24		
Maryland Terrapins (Southern Conference) (1947–1950)
1947–48	Maryland	11–14			
1948–49	Maryland	9–17			
1949–50	Maryland	7–18			
Maryland:		27–49			
Total:		113–116			
National champion Postseason invitational champion Conference regular season champion Conference regular season and conference tournament champion Division regular season champion Division regular season and conference tournament champion Conference tournament champion
