= Walt Williams (basketball) =

American basketball player (born 1970)

Personal information
- Born: April 16, 1970 (age 56) Washington, D.C., U.S.
- Listed height: 6 ft 8 in (2.03 m)
- Listed weight: 219 lb (99 kg)

Career information
- High school: Crossland (Temple Hills, Maryland)
- College: Maryland (1988–1992)
- NBA draft: 1992: 1st round, 7th overall pick
- Drafted by: Sacramento Kings
- Playing career: 1992–2003
- Position: Small forward
- Number: 42, 43

Career history
- 1992–1996: Sacramento Kings
- 1996: Miami Heat
- 1996–1998: Toronto Raptors
- 1998–1999: Portland Trail Blazers
- 1999–2002: Houston Rockets
- 2002–2003: Dallas Mavericks

Career highlights
- NBA All-Rookie Second Team (1993); Consensus second-team All-American (1992); First-team All-ACC (1992)

Career NBA statistics
- Points: 8,385 (11.8 ppg)
- 3-Pointers Made: 976
- 3P%: .379
- Stats at NBA.com
- Stats at Basketball Reference
Medals
Men's basketball
Representing United States
Pan American Games
Bronze medal – third place	1991 Havana	Team competition

Walter Ander "the Wizard" Williams (born April 16, 1970) is an American former professional basketball player. A sharpshooting 6'8" swingman, Williams played college basketball for the Maryland Terrapins from 1988 to 1992, and has been credited for helping to revive the school's basketball program.

== Early life ==
Williams grew up in Temple Hills, Maryland and attended Crossland High School.

== College career ==
Williams began playing at the University of Maryland, College Park, only two years after the death of star Len Bias and the ensuing scandal that cost Lefty Driesell his job as coach. When Williams arrived at Maryland, the Terrapins were also on the verge of receiving major sanctions from the NCAA due to violations committed by Driesell's successor, Bob Wade, that would lead to his resignation. Rather than transfer to another school, Williams chose to remain at Maryland and play under new coach Gary Williams. It was a tremendous boost for the coach, who had to start rebuilding the program from the bottom up while dealing with both the sanctions and tougher academic standards now imposed by the school.

Williams was on the Associated Press All-America Second Team as a senior at Maryland in 1991–92, averaging a school-record 26.8 points, 5.6 rebounds, 3.6 assists, and 2.1 steals. He scored 20 or more points in 19 straight games and broke Len Bias's single-season point total record at Maryland by chalking up 776 points as a senior.

== Professional career ==
Williams was selected by the Sacramento Kings with the seventh pick of the 1992 NBA draft and was on the 1992–93 NBA All-Rookie Second Team. He went on to play 11 seasons in the NBA, spending time with Kings, Miami Heat, Toronto Raptors, Portland Trail Blazers, Houston Rockets, and Dallas Mavericks. Williams stands third in Rockets history with a 3-point percentage of .393. He averaged double digits in scoring in six of eight NBA seasons and scored 8,385 points in his career.

Williams participated in the AT&T Shootout during the 1997 NBA All-Star Weekend in Cleveland.

Williams is known for wearing his socks to his knees, a style which he adopted in honor of his boyhood idol George Gervin. This was also a popular fashion trend among the youth in the D.C. Metro area at that time.

In June 2018, Williams and fellow former Maryland basketball star Tony Massenburg, co-wrote the book Lessons From Lenny. The book is biographical and dives into how the death on Len Bias affected their lives and basketball decisions. Lessons From Lenny, features contributions from Gary Williams and Charles "Lefty" Driesell, Len Elmore, Johnny Rhodes, Keith Booth, Juan Dixon, Steve Blake and more.

=== National team career ===
Williams played on the US team at the 1991 Pan American Games.

== Other activities ==
While in the NBA, Williams established a $125,000 scholarship fund at the University of Maryland which benefits minority students, in honor of his late father, Walter Sr.

Williams serves as a sideline reporter for radio broadcasts of University of Maryland men's basketball games.

=== Film ===
In 1996, he appeared in the film Eddie starring Whoopi Goldberg.

Walt Williams also appeared in the Hootie & the Blowfish music video for the number one song "Only Wanna Be with You".

== Personal life ==
After retiring from the NBA, Williams moved to Brookeville, Maryland and had three sons there with his wife April. He became a coach for his sons' basketball team at Sherwood High School.
