= Lonny Baxter =

American basketball player (born 1979)

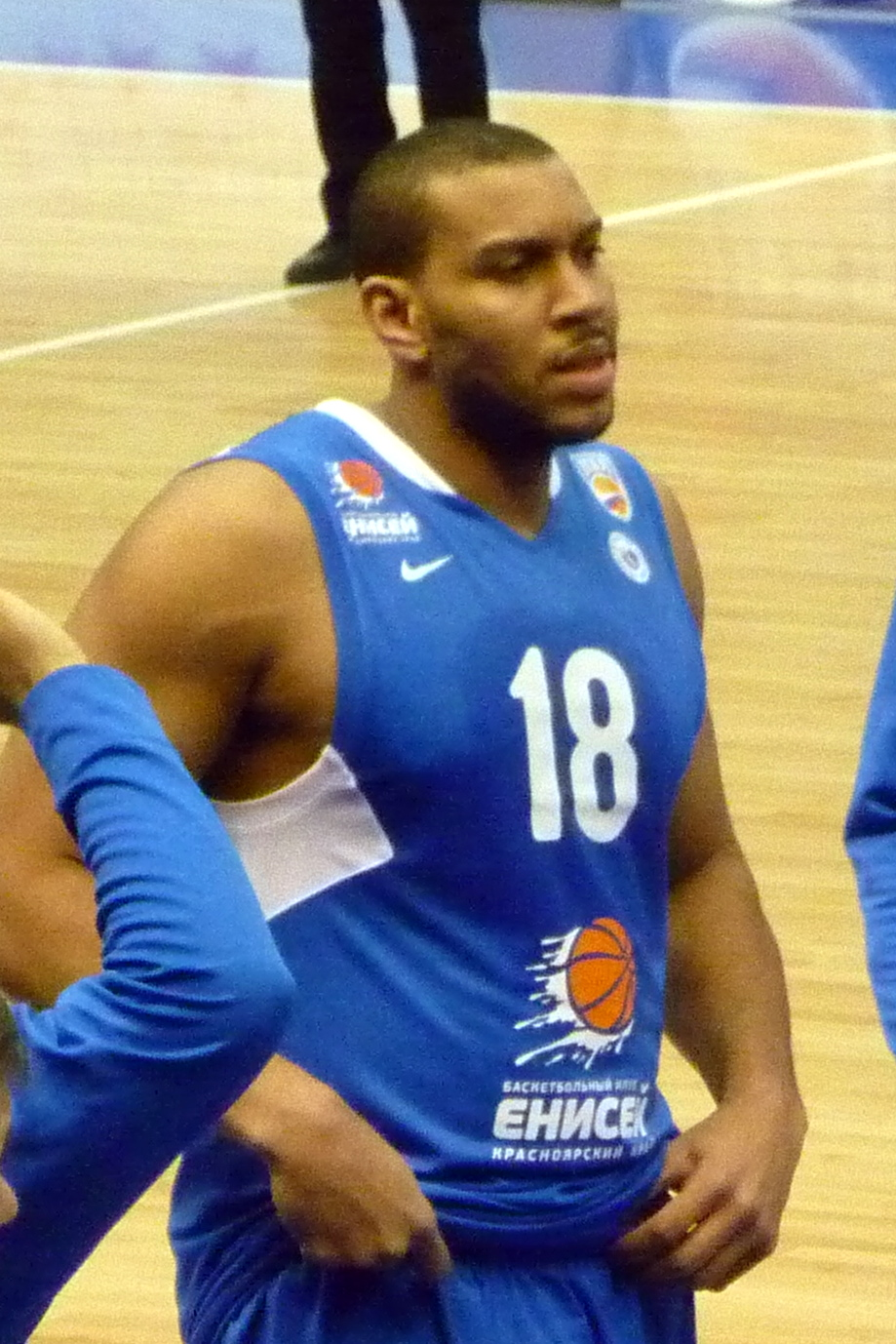
- Baxter with Enisey Krasnoyarsk in 2010

Personal information
- Born: January 27, 1979 (age 47) Silver Spring, Maryland, U.S.
- Listed height: 6 ft 8 in (2.03 m)
- Listed weight: 264 lb (120 kg)

Career information
- High school: Hargrave Military Academy (Chatham, Virginia)
- College: Maryland (1998–2002)
- NBA draft: 2002: 2nd round, 43rd overall pick
- Drafted by: Chicago Bulls
- Playing career: 2002–2013
- Position: Power forward / center
- Number: 35, 3

Career history
- 2002–2003: Chicago Bulls
- 2003–2004: Toronto Raptors
- 2004: Washington Wizards
- 2004: Yakima Sun Kings
- 2004: New Orleans Hornets
- 2005: Panathinaikos
- 2005–2006: Houston Rockets
- 2006: Charlotte Bobcats
- 2006–2007: Montepaschi Siena
- 2007–2008: DKV Joventut
- 2008–2009: Panionios
- 2009–2010: Beşiktaş Cola Turka
- 2010–2012: Enisey Krasnoyarsk
- 2013: Guaiqueríes de Margarita

Career highlights
- Italian League champion (2007); Russian League All-Symbolic Second Team (2011); NCAA champion (2002); First-team All-ACC (2000); 2x Second-team All-ACC (2001, 2002)
- Stats at NBA.com
- Stats at Basketball Reference
Medals
Men's basketball
Representing United States
Summer Universiade
| Bronze medal – third place | 2001 Beijing | Team competition |

Lonny Leroy Baxter (born January 27, 1979) is an American former professional basketball player. He is 6 ft 8 in (2.03 m) in height, and played the power forward and center positions.

== College career ==
While attending the University of Maryland, College Park, Baxter won the 2002 NCAA championship along with teammates and future NBA players Juan Dixon, Steve Blake and Chris Wilcox by defeating Indiana. He was named a regional MVP of the NCAA Tournament twice, in 2001 and 2002.

== Professional career ==
=== NBA ===
Baxter was selected by the Chicago Bulls with the 15th pick of the second round (44th overall) of the 2002 NBA draft. On February 9, 2006, Baxter was traded by the Houston Rockets to the Charlotte Bobcats for Keith Bogans.

Baxter's final game was played on April 19, 2006, in a 96–86 win over the Philadelphia 76ers where he played for 7 minutes and the only stat he recorded was 1 rebound.

Baxter has career NBA averages of 3.9 points and 2.9 rebounds in 162 total games from 2002 to 2006.

=== Europe ===
During the 2004–05 season Baxter played some games for the Greek A1 League team Panathinaikos, before getting injured and agreeing with the club for his release. On August 8, 2006, Baxter signed with the Italian League team Montepaschi Siena. In 2008, he joined Panionios. In 2009, he moved to Beşiktaş Cola Turka.

== Personal life ==
On August 16, 2006, Baxter was arrested in Washington, D.C., only a few blocks from the White House after firing a .40 caliber Glock handgun into the air. On August 23, 2006, Baxter was sentenced to 60 days in prison after pleading guilty to possession of an unregistered firearm and unregistered ammunition charges. DC Superior Court judge Craig Iscoe said:

There's no good reason for a person who's not working in law enforcement or presidential protection to be in possession of a loaded weapon within blocks of the White House, let alone to fire it into the air

Baxter was later charged with shipping four guns via FedEx in July 2006 without notifying them that the shipment contained firearms. Baxter pled guilty to this crime on July 19, 2007. He was sentenced to 60 days in jail, two years of supervised release and a $2,000 fine on August 31, 2007.
