= Gary Williams =

American basketball coach (born 1945)

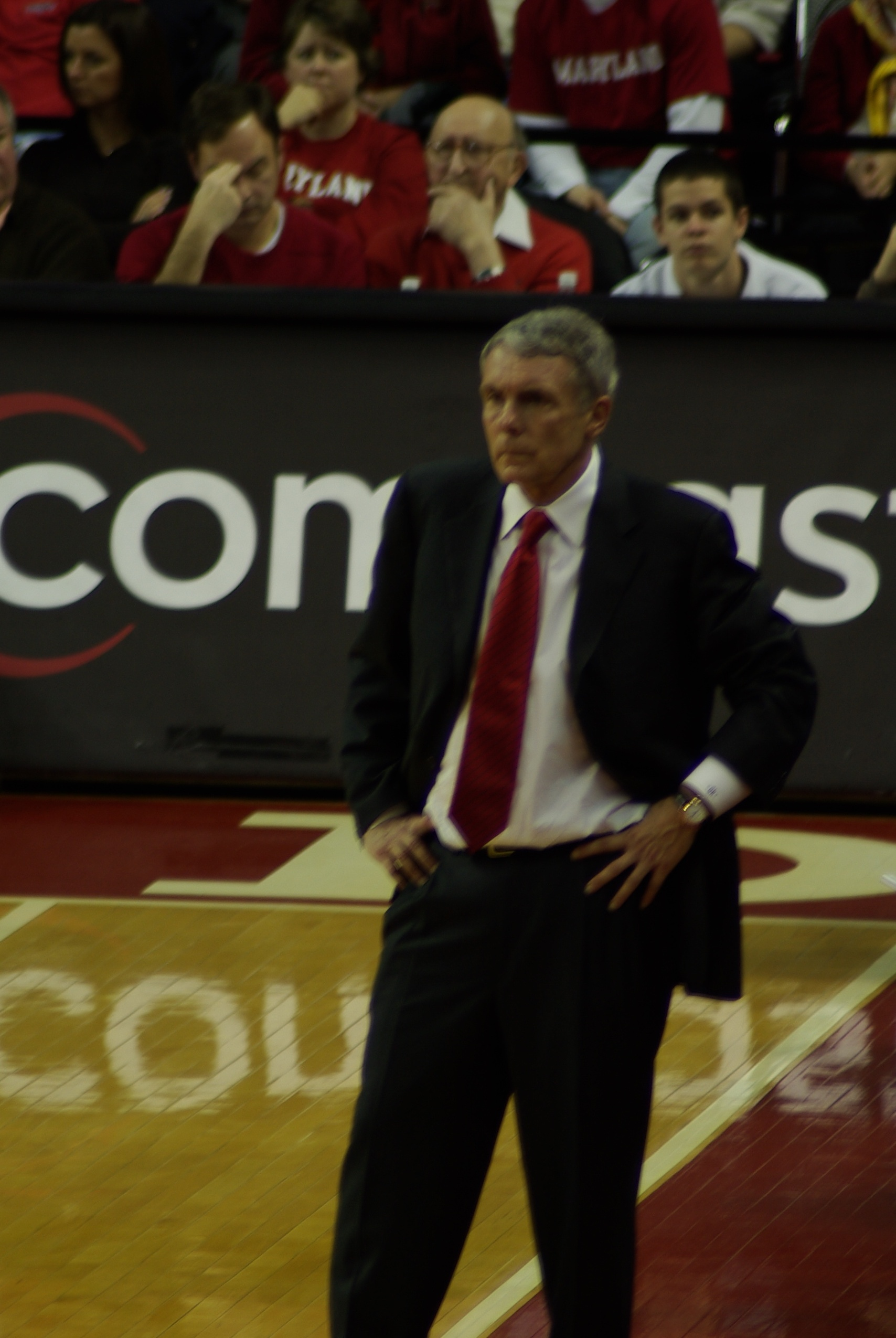
- Williams courtside at the XFINITY Center (then called Comcast Center) in 2008

Current position
- Title: Special assistant to the athletic director
- Team: Maryland
- Conference: Big Ten

Biographical details
- Born: March 4, 1945 (age 81); Collingswood, New Jersey, U.S.

Playing career
- 1964–1967: Maryland
- Position: Point guard

Coaching career (HC unless noted)
- 1969–1971: Woodrow Wilson HS
- 1971–1977: Lafayette (assistant)
- 1977–1978: Boston College (assistant)
- 1978–1982: American
- 1982–1986: Boston College
- 1986–1989: Ohio State
- 1989–2011: Maryland

Administrative career (AD unless noted)
- 2011–present: Maryland (asst. AD)

Head coaching record
- Overall: 668–380 (college)
- Tournaments: 29–16 (NCAA Division I)

Accomplishments and honors

Championships
- NCAA Division I tournament (2002); 2 NCAA Division I Regional – Final Four (2001, 2002); ECC regular season (1981); Big East regular season (1983); ACC tournament (2004); 3 ACC regular season (1995, 2002, 2010)

Awards
- 2× ACC Coach of the Year (2002, 2010)
- Basketball Hall of Fame; Inducted in 2014
- College Basketball Hall of Fame; Inducted in 2014

Gary Bruce Williams (born March 4, 1945) is an American university administrator and former college basketball coach. He served as the head coach at the University of Maryland, the Ohio State University, Boston College, and American University. In 2002, he led Maryland to win the NCAA tournament championship. Williams retired after the 2010–11 season.

On March 25, 2014, Williams was elected to the National Collegiate Basketball Hall of Fame. In April of the same year, he was also voted into the Naismith Memorial Basketball Hall of Fame, making him the first coach in history to be inducted into both institutions in the same year.

== Playing career ==
Williams played for Maryland as the starting point guard under coach Bud Millikan. He was a member of the 1966 Charlotte Invitational Tournament championship team and the 1965 Sugar Bowl Tournament championship team. He set a Maryland record for field goal percentage, going 8-for-8 from the field in an ACC game against South Carolina in 1966 (35 years later a Williams pupil, Lonny Baxter, would break that record, hitting all ten of his field goal attempts). Williams was the Maryland team captain in 1967. He graduated in 1968 with a B.S. in marketing. While at the University of Maryland, Williams was a member of Phi Delta Theta fraternity.

== Coaching career ==
=== Early coaching career ===
Prior to entering the college ranks, Williams was a successful high school basketball coach at Woodrow Wilson High School in Camden, New Jersey. He won a NJSIAA state championship as head varsity coach at Wilson High. With his chance to learn under Tom Davis (whom Williams got to know when Davis was an assistant coach at Maryland), Williams left to become an assistant basketball coach at Lafayette College in 1971 and continued at Boston College in 1977 until he became a head coach. He was also the head soccer coach at Lafayette College during his assistant coaching job.

Williams held three head coaching positions prior to Maryland. In 1978, Williams obtained his first head coaching position at American University. He led American to relative success, coaching them to several NIT berths. In 1982, Williams returned to Boston College, leading the Eagles to two NCAA tournament appearances, and one NIT appearance in his four-year tenure. In 1986, Williams took over at Ohio State of the Big Ten Conference. Under Williams, the Buckeyes advanced to one NCAA tournament appearance and two NIT appearances in three seasons.

=== Maryland ===
The Maryland Terrapins, an original member of the Atlantic Coast Conference, announced Williams as its next head coach on June 13, 1989. The basketball program and the Maryland athletic program as a whole were still reeling from the aftershock of the 1986 death of Maryland basketball star Len Bias and struggles under coach Bob Wade, a former high school coach from Baltimore.

Williams coached the 1989–90 team to a respectable 18–13 record and an NIT berth. However, in March 1990, the NCAA imposed harsh sanctions on the school for several major violations, mostly dating to the Wade era. Maryland was banned from postseason play in 1991 and 1992, and was kicked off live television for 1990–91. Additionally, Maryland docked itself several scholarships over two years. With his recruiting efforts severely hamstrung, Williams found it very difficult to rebuild the program. However, with the help of Walt Williams, Maryland stayed competitive through a low point of the program's history.

After a surprise appearance in the 1994 Sweet 16, the Terrapins were a fixture in the national rankings until 2005. Maryland's teams during this era featured future NBA players such as Joe Smith, Steve Francis, Juan Dixon, Steve Blake, Lonny Baxter, Keith Booth, Terence Morris and Chris Wilcox, and a cast of supportive role players, exemplified by Byron Mouton.

In 2001, Williams led Maryland to the first Final Four in school history, losing to Duke in the semifinals. On April 1, 2002, Williams led the Terrapins to their first NCAA National Championship, defeating Indiana 64–52. Williams was the first coach to win a national championship without a single McDonald's All American on the roster since its inception. He became the first coach to direct his alma mater to a national title since Norm Sloan accomplished the feat with North Carolina State in 1974. The 2002 team also won a school-record 32 games, as well as the school's first outright ACC title in 22 years—only the third time since 1981 that a team from North Carolina hadn't won at least a share of the title. In March 2004, Maryland won the ACC Tournament Title, defeating Duke 95–87, led by Tournament MVP John Gilchrist.

In the 2004–2005 season, Maryland failed to make the NCAA tournament for the first time since the 1993–1994 season, which was then the longest streak in the ACC. This began a relatively mediocre stretch for Maryland, where they failed to make the tournament three out of the next five years.

In 2010, the Terrapins shared the regular-season conference title with Duke. The same season, Williams also earned his second ACC Coach of the Year award. 2011 saw the Terrapins struggle to a 19–14 mark, failing to make the post-season for the first time since 1993.

On May 5, 2011, Williams announced his decision to retire from coaching basketball. He has remained with the Maryland athletic department as Assistant Athletic Director and Special Assistant to the Athletic Director.

On January 26, 2012; Maryland honored Williams by renaming the playing surface at the XFINITY Center "Gary Willams Court."

=== Coaching profile ===
In March 2010, Williams was the 5th winningest active coach in the country and the 3rd winningest coach all-time in the ACC (behind only Dean Smith and Mike Krzyzewski). In his 31 years as a head coach, Williams has amassed an overall record of 654–368 (.640) and 447–240 (.651) at Maryland. He passed Lefty Driesell as the school's winningest coach in 2006.

Williams has an overall NCAA tournament record of 29–16 (.644), 25–13 (.658) at his alma mater. His 29 wins in the NCAA tournament places him seventh among active coaches in that category. Williams has coached Maryland to fourteen NCAA tournament appearances, including a streak of eleven consecutive appearances (1993–94 season to 2003–04 season), as well as four post season NIT appearances, allowing Maryland to own the longest current consecutive streak of postseason appearances in the ACC (Wake Forest, who had previously had the longest active streak, failed to qualify for the postseason in 2007). Additionally, Williams has 71 wins over top 25 ranked opponents, 33 wins over top 10 ranked opponents (at least one every season from 96–97 to 09–10), 20 wins over top 5 opponents, three ACC regular season titles (co-champions in 1995 and 2010, and outright champions in 2002), and an ACC tournament title (2004). Williams' NCAA Tournament accomplishments include seven Sweet Sixteens, two Elite Eights, two Final Fours, and a national championship in 2002. Williams also leads active coaches with seven wins over top-ranked teams, the most recent coming against North Carolina on January 19, 2008. Since 1995, Coach Williams and Maryland have averaged 22.5 wins per season. Williams has led the Terrapins to at least 20 wins in 10 of the last 13 seasons and is tied with Rick Pitino for 6th among active coaches with 17 career 20-win seasons.

Williams had a discordant relationship with his former athletic director, Debbie Yow, who is now the athletic director at North Carolina State University. In April 2011, Yow, after hiring Mark Gottfried to be the new head coach of the Wolfpack basketball team, accused the Maryland coach of attempting to "sabotage" N.C. State's search process by advising candidates that she was difficult to work with. Williams immediately denied the accusation.

=== Milestones since 2005–06 season ===
A home victory over Virginia on January 19, 2005, moved Williams into a tie with former Virginia head coach Terry Holland as the fifth winningest coach in ACC history. On January 21, 2006, a home victory over Virginia Tech earned Williams his 142nd ACC win, moving him into a tie with former Carolina head coach Frank McGuire for third place in that category. Four nights later, a victory over Georgia Tech gave him third place outright.

On February 7, 2006, a 76–65 home victory over Virginia gave Williams his 349th win, allowing him to pass Lefty Driesell as the university's all-time winningest head coach. On February 3, 2007, a road victory over Wake Forest earned Williams his 150th ACC victory. He is the third coach in conference history to accomplish this feat; only Dean Smith and Mike Krzyzewski have won more conference games.

On February 6, 2008, a 70–65 road victory over Boston College gave Williams his 600th win. Gary Williams is one of only 8 active NCAA basketball head coaches with at least 600 wins.

On November 21, 2008, an 89–74 overtime home victory over Vermont gave Williams his 400th victory at his alma mater. In ACC history, Williams stands alongside Smith and Krzyzewski as the only coaches to amass this number of wins.

On February 21, 2009, Williams upset #3 (AP/ESPN Coaches Polls) University of North Carolina, 88–85 in overtime. Then on March 12, Williams' Terps earned another victory over a top 10 opponent, defeating #8 Wake Forest, the second-seeded team, 75–64 in the quarterfinals of the 2009 ACC tournament, following a 74–69 victory over N.C. State in the opening round. The victory over the Demon Deacons was Williams' 17th ACC Tournament victory, tying Lefty Driesell for the most in school history.

Williams coached in his 1,000th game on January 22, 2010, an 88–64 victory over NC State. On March 9, 2010, he was named the ACC coach of the year. On March 19, 2010, Williams coached Maryland (#4 rank in the Midwest Region) to a first-round victory, by a score of 89–77, over Houston (#13 rank in the Midwest Region) in the opening round of the 2010 NCAA Men's Basketball Championship. Two days later, Williams engineered a comeback in the final seconds of the second-round game against Michigan State, only to lose to a buzzer beater shot by Korie Lucious. The final score was 85–83. A win would have put Williams in the Sweet Sixteen for the 9th time in his coaching career.

On March 25, 2014, Williams was elected to the National Collegiate Basketball Hall of Fame. In April of the same year, he was also voted into the Naismith Memorial Basketball Hall of Fame, making him the first coach in history to be inducted into both institutions in the same year.

== Personal life ==
Williams grew up in Collingswood, New Jersey, a suburb of Philadelphia, where he attended Collingswood High School. He was married to Diane McMillen from 1968 to 1990. Williams has a daughter and three grandchildren. He remarried in April 2011. Williams suffers from hyperhidrosis, and has devoted his time to raising awareness of the ailment and advocating for greater research efforts to find treatments.

== Trademarks ==
=== Coaching style ===
Williams exclusively ran the flex offense, with a strong emphasis on first getting the ball inside to the post, and once the opposing defense collapses, distributing the ball to the perimeter. On defense, he favors a highly physical, pressing and trapping style, using turnovers to key the offense through the fast break. His defensive philosophy is inspired by both his former coach Bud Millikan, who utilized an aggressive man-to-man scheme, and Tom Davis who helped teach Williams the more aggressive trapping schemes in addition to the fast break offense.

=== Recruiting style ===
"Satisfaction in your job to me isn't just getting some list and saying, 'OK, that guy is rated top in the country. OK, we have to recruit him to be a good coaching staff' ... Why not be a coach instead of a used car salesman?"

— Williams, ESPN interview, 2001

Williams gained a reputation as a recruiter who almost exclusively went after less-heralded players and develops them into Division I talents. An opposing coach, Dave Odom, once said in a newspaper interview that Williams "has made a living off of the player who is maybe one or two tools short of the complete package (say, height or leaping ability), but who competes hard and plays with a chip on his shoulder." Much of his success in the years since the university recovered from NCAA sanctions was from players that fit that mold.

In 2009, The Washington Post published an extensive exposé on Williams' tenure from the 2002 title year to mid-season 2008–09. The three-part feature analyzed Williams' recruiting process, and noted how local prep basketball talent went elsewhere for college. It cited that Williams refused to associate closely with local AAU basketball program directors and coaches, due to their questionable reputations. The Post asserted this reticence stemmed from the Rudy Gay recruiting episode. The Baltimore Sun staff writers covering Maryland have challenged Williams' recruiting procedures, but also noted his personality reflects whom he recruits.

== Head coaching record ==
Record table
Season	Team	Overall	Conference	Standing	Postseason
American Eagles (East Coast Conference) (1978–1982)
1978–79	American	14–13	7–4	4th	
1979–80	American	13–14	5–6	4th	
1980–81	American	24–6	11–0	1st	NIT First Round
1981–82	American	21–9	8–3	3rd	NIT First Round
American:		72–42 (.632)	31–13 (.705)		
Boston College Eagles (Big East Conference) (1982–1986)
1982–83	Boston College	25–7	12–4	1st	NCAA Division I Sweet 16
1983–84	Boston College	18–12	8–8	4th	NIT Second Round
1984–85	Boston College	20–11	7–9	6th	NCAA Division I Sweet 16
1985–86	Boston College	13–15	4–12	7th	
Boston College:		76–45 (.628)	31–33 (.484)		
Ohio State Buckeyes (Big Ten Conference) (1986–1989)
1986–87	Ohio State	20–13	9–9	6th	NCAA Division I Second Round
1987–88	Ohio State	20–13	9–9	6th	NIT Runner-up
1988–89	Ohio State	19–15	6–12	8th	NIT Quarterfinal
Ohio State:		59–41 (.590)	24–30 (.444)		
Maryland Terrapins (Atlantic Coast Conference) (1989–2011)
1989–90	Maryland	19–14	6–8	T–5th	NIT Second Round
1990–91	Maryland	16–12	5–9	T–7th	
1991–92	Maryland	14–15	5–11	8th	
1992–93	Maryland	12–16	2–14	8th	
1993–94	Maryland	18–12	8–8	T–4th	NCAA Division I Sweet 16
1994–95	Maryland	26–8	12–4	T–1st	NCAA Division I Sweet 16
1995–96	Maryland	17–13	8–8	T–4th	NCAA Division I First Round
1996–97	Maryland	21–11	9–7	T–4th	NCAA Division I First Round
1997–98	Maryland	21–11	10–6	3rd	NCAA Division I Sweet 16
1998–99	Maryland	28–6	13–3	2nd	NCAA Division I Sweet 16
1999–00	Maryland	25–10	11–5	2nd	NCAA Division I Second Round
2000–01	Maryland	25–11	10–6	3rd	NCAA Division I Final Four
2001–02	Maryland	32–4	15–1	1st	NCAA Division I champion
2002–03	Maryland	21–10	11–5	T–2nd	NCAA Division I Sweet 16
2003–04	Maryland	20–12	7–9	T–6th	NCAA Division I Second Round
2004–05	Maryland	19–13	7–9	T–6th	NIT Semifinal
2005–06	Maryland	19–13	8–8	6th	NIT First Round
2006–07	Maryland	25–9	10–6	T–3rd	NCAA Division I Second Round
2007–08	Maryland	19–15	8–8	T–5th	NIT Second Round
2008–09	Maryland	21–14	7–9	T–7th	NCAA Division I Second Round
2009–10	Maryland	24–9	13–3	T–1st	NCAA Division I Second Round
2010–11	Maryland	19–14	7–9	T–7th	
Maryland:		461–252 (.647)	192–156 (.552)		
Total:		668–380 (.637)			
National champion Postseason invitational champion Conference regular season champion Conference regular season and conference tournament champion Division regular season champion Division regular season and conference tournament champion Conference tournament champion

== See also ==
- List of college men's basketball coaches with 600 wins
- List of NCAA Division I Men's Final Four appearances by coach
