= Maryland Terrapins men's basketball =

Men's basketball team of the University of Maryland

2026–27 Maryland Terrapins men's basketball team
- University: University of Maryland
- First season: 1904–05; 122 years ago
- Athletic director: James E. Smith
- Head coach: Buzz Williams; 2nd season, 12–20 (.375)
- Location: College Park, Maryland
- Arena: Xfinity Center (capacity: 17,950)
- NCAA division: Division I
- Conference: Big Ten
- Nickname: Terrapins
- Colors: Red, white, black, and gold
- Student section: The Wall
- All-time record: 1,696–1,132 (.600)
- NCAA tournament record: 46–30 (.605)

NCAA Division I tournament champions
- 2002
Other NCAA Division I tournament results
Final Four	2001, 2002
Elite Eight	1973, 1975, 2001, 2002
Sweet Sixteen	1958, 1973, 1975, 1980, 1984, 1985, 1994, 1995, 1998, 1999, 2001, 2002, 2003, 2016, 2025
Appearances	1958, 1973, 1975, 1980, 1981, 1983, 1984, 1985, 1986, 1988*, 1994, 1995, 1996, 1997, 1998, 1999, 2000, 2001, 2002, 2003, 2004, 2007, 2009, 2010, 2015, 2016, 2017, 2019, 2021, 2023, 2025

NIT champions
- 1972

Conference tournament champions
- SoCon: 1931 ACC: 1958, 1984, 2004

Conference regular-season champions
- SoCon: 1932 ACC: 1975, 1980, 1995, 2002, 2010 Big Ten: 2020

Uniforms
Home	Away	Alternate
- * vacated by NCAA

The Maryland Terrapins men's basketball team represents the University of Maryland in National Collegiate Athletic Association Division I competition. Maryland, a founding member of the Atlantic Coast Conference (ACC), left the ACC in 2014 to join the Big Ten Conference. Gary Williams, who coached the Terrapins from 1989 to 2011, led the program to notable achievements, including two consecutive Final Fours in 2001 and 2002, which culminated in the 2002 NCAA National Championship. Maryland has appeared in 31 NCAA tournaments and won their conference tournament 4 times. The Terrapins have competed in 102 seasons, accumulating an overall record of 1,678–1,109 as of the 2024–25 season.

The Terrapins played in an Atlantic Coast Conference game — the championship of the 1974 ACC men's basketball tournament, in which they lost 103–100 in overtime to eventual national champion North Carolina State. The game was instrumental in forcing the expansion of the NCAA Men's Division I Basketball Championship, thus allowing for at-large bids and the inclusion of more than one team per conference. That Maryland team, with six future NBA draft picks, is considered by many to be the greatest team not to have participated in the NCAA tournament.

== History ==
=== Early years – the H. Burton Shipley era ===
Before basketball became a permanent fixture in College Park, the school—then known as Maryland Agricultural College—met with little success in its intermittent attempts to establish a basketball team. A team first appeared in 1904–05, playing only two games in an intramural/club setting. Their first game was recorded as a loss to a "Washington YMCA," but the final score is unknown. Games were played sporadically during the 1910–1911, 1912–13, 1913–1914, and the 1918–1919 seasons, going a combined 7–36. Basketball returned to stay for the 1923–24 season, when the school convinced former star quarterback H. Burton Shipley, who had been coaching at the University of Delaware, to come back to his alma mater. The Old Liners, as they were then known, joined the Southern Conference in their inaugural season. The team met with moderate success that year at 5–7 and also played its first games against future ACC rivals North Carolina and Virginia. The Old Liners had their first sustained success over the next four seasons, finishing at or above .500 in each of them and putting together an outstanding 24–9 record against Southern Conference foes. The Aggies also played their first games against the teams who would become their two other biggest rivals in the future during that time, North Carolina State and Duke.

The school's biggest success during its formative years took place in the early 1930s, around the time it adopted its current nickname, Terrapins. After finishing second in the conference in 1930–31, Maryland won the Southern Conference tournaments, beating Louisiana State, North Carolina, Georgia, and Kentucky over five days, a feat they followed by winning the conference regular season crown the next year. The team also had its first individual star in Louis "Bosey" Berger who was named to All-America teams both seasons. It was during this stretch that the school erected a new home for its basketball teams, Ritchie Coliseum, which housed the team until Cole Field House replaced it a quarter of a century later.

Although the team would remain competitive throughout the rest of the decade, finishing as high as second in the conference regular season, it never again matched its achievements of the early part of the decade, and as the 1940s began, the school's basketball team fell on exceedingly hard times. Shipley tallied just one winning season in his last seven years before stepping down to focus on coaching the baseball team, a post he'd held for his entire tenure since returning to College Park. He was succeeded by Flucie Stewart. In what would become a long-running pattern at Maryland when a long-tenured head coach stepped down, Stewart would not last very long, putting together three losing seasons in three tries during his brief time at Maryland.

=== The Bud Millikan era and the ACC ===
The 1950s began with a new head coach leading the way, Bud Millikan. A disciple of Henry Iba, Millikan's emphasis on defense and fundamentals would become hallmarks of the program over the next two decades. Maryland quickly reeled off seven straight winning seasons under Millikan. For the 1953–54 season, the team joined North Carolina, North Carolina State, Duke, Wake Forest, Virginia, Clemson, and South Carolina in leaving the SoCon for the newly formed Atlantic Coast Conference. That season was perhaps the finest the Terrapins had experienced to date, finishing with a 23–7 record and a conference mark good enough for second in the league. Maryland experienced its first games as a ranked team, spending the final nine weeks of the season ranked in the AP Top 20, peaking at No. 11 before settling for a final ranking of #20. It also featured the school's first win over a ranked team when it beat local rival George Washington, then-number 7 in the country. The team was led by its second All-American, Gene Shue, who was honored in both that season and the prior year.

After that season, the team remained the only school outside of the North Carolina "Big Four" – Duke, UNC, North Carolina State, and Wake Forest – to consistently field competitive teams. In the ACC's second year, the Terps cracked the top ten for the first time, peaking at No. 6 in January before eventually finishing the season with a disappointing one-point loss to Virginia in the ACC tournament quarterfinal round.

The Terps had another breakout season during the 1957–58 season. After a good regular season (17–6, 4th in the ACC), Maryland stunned the league by winning the ACC tournament, including wins over #6 Duke and #13 North Carolina on back to back days to capture the title as well as the league's berth in the NCAA tournament. The team routed Boston College 86–63 at Madison Square Garden with just two days of rest after the ACC tournament, advancing to the East Regionals in Charlotte. The Terps lost a tight game to Temple in the round of 16 before beating Manhattan in the consolation game to secure third place in the East.

That would be the high-water mark for the Terps under Millikan. They experienced their first losing season under the coach the next season, although they did manage to finish third in the ACC, including its first ever win over a #1 ranked team when it beat North Carolina 69–51 in Cole Field House on February 21. By 1962–63, the bottom had dropped out and the Terps finished just 3–11 in the ACC, next to last in the standings. While Millikan managed to turn the program around in the mid-1960s, finishing in a second place tie in 1964–65 and above .500 overall again the next season, the feeling in College Park was that the game had passed the coach by, and he was replaced after the following season by assistant Frank Fellows. Fellows' tenure lasted just two seasons, both of which featured only eight wins.

=== The Lefty Driesell era ===
In 1969, Charles "Lefty" Driesell was hired by the University of Maryland. During his introductory press conference, he made the bold statement that he wanted to make Maryland the "UCLA of the East". At that time, UCLA was the nation's dominant college basketball program. While Driesell did not elevate Maryland to UCLA's heights, he did lead the Terrapins to eight NCAA tournament appearances, a National Invitation Tournament championship, two Atlantic Coast Conference regular season championships, and one Atlantic Coast Conference tournament championship. Maryland also attained a No. 2 Associated Press ranking during four consecutive seasons from 1972 to 1976.

Driesell coached the Maryland Terrapins from 1969 to 1986. During his tenure, he successfully recruited numerous exceptional players, including Tom McMillen, Len Elmore, John Lucas, Albert King, Buck Williams, and Len Bias. In 1974, he signed perhaps the best college prospect of his career, future basketball Hall of Famer Moses Malone, but Malone chose instead to go to a professional basketball franchise, the Utah Stars. Malone was the first player in the modern era to proceed directly from high school into professional basketball, deciding on the day classes were scheduled to begin.

At Maryland, Driesell began the now nationwide tradition of Midnight Madness. According to longstanding NCAA rules, college basketball teams were not permitted to begin practices until October 15. Driesell traditionally began the first practice with a requirement that his players run one mile in six minutes, but found that the players were too fatigued to practice effectively immediately afterwards. At 12:03 a.m. on October 15, 1971, Driesell held a one-mile run at the track around Byrd Stadium, where a crowd of 1,000 fans had gathered after learning of the unorthodox practice session. The event soon became a tradition to build excitement for the basketball team's upcoming season.

In 1972, Maryland defeated Niagara, 100–69 to secure the National Invitation Tournament championship. Driesell said that the season attained the three goals he had set for the program at the time of his hiring: "national prominence", "national ranking", and "a national championship".

On July 12, 1973, Driesell saved the lives of at least ten children from several burning buildings. He and two other men were surf fishing around midnight in Bethany Beach, Delaware when he saw flames coming from a seashore resort. Driesell broke down a door and rescued several children from the fire that eventually destroyed four townhouses. An eyewitness, Prince George's County circuit court Judge Samuel Meloy, said, "Let's face it, Driesell was a hero. There were no injuries and it was a miracle because firemen didn't come for at least 30 minutes." Driesell said, "Don't build me up as any kind of hero. All we did was try to get the kids out. It was just lucky that we were fishing right in front of the houses." For these actions, Driesell was awarded the NCAA Award of Valor.

In 1974, the No. 4 Terrapins played in what many consider one of the greatest college basketball games of all time, losing the ACC men's basketball tournament 103–100 in overtime to eventual national champion and No. 1 North Carolina State. Each team only played seven players each, and eight of those 14 went on to be NBA Draft picks, including six from Maryland. The game included 91 field goals made on 157 attempts between the teams, in spite of top-level defense being played. "We didn't score 100 points or they didn't because we were sorry defensive teams. (N.C. State) had a 7-foot-4 center" in Tommy Burleson, said Lefty Driesell. "We had (Len) Elmore, who was one of the best shot-blockers ever to play in the league." After the game, the Greensboro, N.C. crowd, traditionally unfriendly to non-North Carolina ACC teams, gave both teams a standing ovation. After the loss, Maryland declined an invitation to the NIT. Maryland's team was considered by many to be the greatest team not to have participated in the NCAA tournament because, at the time, only the winner of a conference tournament would earn a bid. It was Maryland's exclusion that finally forced an expansion to allow at-large bids and more than one team per conference.

Driesell's legacy will forever be tied to one of Maryland's greatest players and one of the best college basketball players of all time, Len Bias, who played under Driesell from 1982 to 1986. As a freshman, Bias was viewed as "raw and undisciplined", but ultimately developed into an All-American player who impressed basketball fans with his amazing leaping ability, his physical stature and his ability to create plays, and was considered one of the most dynamic players in the nation. In 1984, Driesell and Bias led the team to the school's second ACC tournament Championship. In Bias's junior year, he led the ACC in scoring, was named the ACC Player of the Year, and was a consensus second-team All-American while averaging 18.9 points and 6.8 rebounds per game. His senior season was highlighted by his performance in an overtime victory against top-ranked North Carolina in which he scored 35 points, including 7 in the last 3 minutes of regulation and 4 in overtime. At the end of the year, Bias collected his second ACC Player of the Year award and was a consensus first-team All American while averaging 23.2 points and 7 rebounds per game. Scouts from various NBA teams viewed Bias as the most complete forward in the class of 1986 and was widely considered to be of equal talent to Michael Jordan, who played at North Carolina from 1981 to 1984. "Over the years, you've heard a lot of people say it was that jumper that separated him from Michael Jordan — and could have potentially made him a better player than Jordan in the pros," said Keith Gatlin, who was the starting point guard on the school's 1985-1986 team and lived with Bias. Together, Bias and Driesell made four straight NCAA tournaments, making the Sweet 16 in 1984 and 1985.

On June 19, 1986, Bias tragically died of a cocaine-induced heart attack shortly after being drafted by the Boston Celtics as the No. 2 overall selection. An investigation revealed that Bias was 21 credits short of the graduation requirement despite having used all his athletic eligibility. In October, a university panel found that the basketball staff had stressed athletics over academics. On October 29, Driesell resigned as head coach and took a position as an assistant athletic director. He also worked as a television analyst during college basketball games. Some members of the media widely described Driesell as a scapegoat of chancellor John B. Slaughter and the university administration.

In 2018, Coach Driesell was finally inducted into the Naismith Memorial Basketball Hall of Fame.

=== Top of the mountain: the Gary Williams era ===
The Maryland Terrapins announced Maryland alumnus Gary Williams as its next head coach on June 13, 1989. The basketball program and the Maryland athletic program as a whole were still reeling from the aftershock of the 1986 death of Maryland basketball star Len Bias and struggles under coach Bob Wade, a former high school coach from Baltimore. Williams was coming off a successful stint at Ohio State featuring one NCAA tournament appearance and two NIT appearances in three seasons. Williams played for Maryland as the starting point guard under coach Bud Millikan. He was a member of the 1966 Charlotte Invitational Tournament championship team and the 1965 Sugar Bowl Tournament championship team. He set a Maryland record for field goal percentage, going 8-for-8 from the field in an ACC game against South Carolina in 1966. (35 years later a Williams pupil, Lonny Baxter, would break that record, hitting all ten of his field goal attempts.) Williams was the Maryland team captain in 1967. He graduated in 1968 with a B.S. in marketing.

Williams coached the 1989–90 squad to a respectable 18–13 record and an NIT berth. However, in March 1990, the NCAA imposed harsh sanctions on the school for several violations, mostly dating to the Wade era. Maryland was banned from postseason play in 1991 and 1992, and was kicked off live television for 1990–91. Additionally, Maryland docked itself several scholarships over two years. With his recruiting efforts severely hamstrung, Williams found it very difficult to rebuild the program. However, with the help of Walt Williams, Maryland stayed competitive through a low point of the program's history.

After a surprise appearance in the 1994 Sweet 16, the Terrapins were a fixture in the national rankings until 2005. Maryland's teams during this era featured future NBA players such as Joe Smith, Steve Francis, Šarūnas Jasikevičius, Juan Dixon, Steve Blake, Lonny Baxter, Terence Morris, and Chris Wilcox, and a cast of supportive role players, exemplified by Byron Mouton.

In 2001, Williams led Maryland to the first Final Four in school history, losing to Duke in the semifinals despite leading by as much as 22 points in the first half and being up by 11 at half. Maryland fans largely attribute the loss to several controversial fouls that limited the Terps' defense, including a phantom fifth foul on Lonnie Baxter with 2:48 remaining. The Final Four loss to Duke was the fourth meeting between the two schools during the season, which included each team winning on the other's home court. Duke's win at Cole Field House is known as the "Gone in 54 Seconds" game, after Duke came back to win despite being down 10 points with under a minute left. The Terps got their revenge by winning on Shane Battier's senior night at Cameron Indoor Stadium before losing to Duke by two points in the ACC tournament semifinals on a tip-in shot with 1.3 seconds remaining.

On April 1, 2002, Williams led the Terrapins to their first NCAA National Championship, defeating Indiana 64–52. Maryland's historic run included wins against four straight former champions, including Kentucky in the Sweet 16, UConn in the Elite Eight, and Kansas in the Final Four. Williams was the first coach to win a national championship without a single McDonald's All American on the roster since its inception. He became the first coach to direct his alma mater to a national title since Norm Sloan accomplished the feat with North Carolina State in 1974. The 2002 team also won a school-record 32 games, as well as the school's first outright ACC title in 22 years—only the third time since 1981 that a team from North Carolina hadn't won at least a share of the title. Senior Juan Dixon was named the 2002 NCAA Final Four MVP, ACC Player of the Year, and finished his career as the school's all-time scoring leader. Steve Blake also produced what Maryland fans remember as the "Oh He Steal" game, when Blake memorably stole the ball from Duke's Jay Williams and scored just before halftime in front of a raucous home crowd. 2001-2002 was also the Terps' final season in historic Cole Field House, with Maryland going undefeated at their long-time home.

In 2004, having slipped to 7–9 in the ACC (the team's first sub-.500 conference record in more than a decade), the Terps upset the tournament's top three seeds to win its first ACC tournament title since 1984. In knocking off No. 15 Wake Forest (3 seed), No. 17 NC State (2), and No. 5 Duke (1), tournament MVP John Gilchrist dazzled. Gilchrist scored 16 points against a Chris Paul-led Wake Forest team, led a 21-point comeback against NC State by scoring 23 of his 30 points after halftime, and poured in another 26 points in a memorable 95–87 overtime victory over Duke in the final. Maryland's championship ended Duke's streak of five straight ACC championships.

In the 2004–05 season, Maryland failed to make the NCAA tournament for the first time since the 1993–1994 season, which was then the longest streak in the ACC. This began a stretch of limited success for Maryland, where they failed to make the tournament three out of the next five years. Maryland's best team in these years was 2006–07, when the team finished 25–9 (10–7 ACC) and ranked No. 18 in the final AP poll. Led by the once highly touted senior class of D. J. Strawberry, Mike Jones, Ekene Ibekwe, and Will Bowers, along with freshman Greivis Vasquez, the Terps beat a Stephen Curry-led Davidson squad in the first round of the NCAA tournament before narrowly missing the Sweet 16 when they fell to Butler 59–62, which shot 12-26 (46%) from 3. The 06-07 squad beat Duke twice and won against No. 5 North Carolina.

The 2009–10 Terrapins brought the swagger (and the shimmy) back to College Park when they won a share of the regular-season conference title with Duke. Senior Greivis Vasquez won ACC Player of the Year and consensus second team All American honors as he climbed to No. 2 all time in points and assists at Maryland, while Williams earned his second ACC Coach of the Year award. The season's highlights included Cliff Tucker's buzzer beating three pointer to defeat Georgia Tech at home (after Coach Williams called a timeout that unintentionally nullified what would have been a game-winning three by Vasquez) and a win over eventual national champion Duke on Vasquez's senior night. The Terrapins earned a 4 seed in the Midwest Regional of the NCAA tournament, where they handily beat Houston 89–77 in the first round. In the second round Maryland faced a tough 5th seeded Michigan State, coached by Tom Izzo and led on the court by Kalin Lucas and future NBA star Draymond Green. Behind Vasquez's 26 points, Maryland stormed back from 17 points down in the second half to take the lead in the final seconds before MSU's Korie Lucious hit a heartbreaking buzzer beater to sink the Terrapins 85–83. The loss especially hurt after the top seed in the region, Kansas, lost to 9 seed Northern Iowa, which opened a clear path to the Final Four. The 2009–2010 team was to be the last great Gary Williams team. The following season a group of promising freshmen and veteran holdovers from the 2009–2010 team failed to replicate the success of the prior season and the Terrapins struggled to a 19–14 mark, failing to make the post-season altogether for the first time since 1993.

On May 5, 2011, Gary Williams announced his decision to retire from coaching basketball. He remains involved with the Maryland athletic department as Assistant Athletic Director and Special Assistant to the athletic director. Gary Williams will always be treasured and remembered for saving his alma mater from the doldrums of the post-Bias era years and eventually building Maryland into a national champion. In honor of his career, Maryland named its hardwood at the Xfinity Center "Gary Williams Court". In 2014, Coach Williams was inducted into the Naismith Memorial Basketball Hall of Fame.

=== B1G new world – the Mark Turgeon era ===
Mark Turgeon had built a mid major program at Wichita State but ended with a disappointing year before beginning a successful spell in College Station with the Aggies in 2007.

Prior to his last year at Texas A&M, Turgeon had negotiated a contract extension and salary increase. On May 9, 2011, at 8pm, Turgeon met with his coaching staff and players to inform them that half an hour earlier he accepted the head coach position at the University of Maryland. He had visited the campus earlier that day and left with an offer. When asked about his decision at an Aggie Athletics press conference, he said "Maryland's got a great basketball tradition. [Texas A&M and Maryland are] real similar. It's a gut feeling." In their meeting earlier that night he told the Aggie players "it was the hardest decision [he] ever had to make... because of [them]." Turgeon said that fan attendance at A&M did not factor into his decision.

=== The last ACC years: 2011–2014 ===
Turgeon inherited an average roster featuring hardworking forward James Padgett, the well rounded Sean Mosley, sophomore point guard Pe'Shon Howard, and volume scorer Terrell Stoglin. Turgeon and his staff secured 4 star Baltimore freshman Nick Faust and the Ukrainian big man Alex Len. Turgeon captured his first win as the University of Maryland Head Coach on November 13, 2011, by defeating UNC Wilmington at the Comcast Center 71–62. Maryland struggled throughout the season and finished with a 17–15 overall record and a 6–10 mark in the ACC.

The 2012–13 team was a young team. Veteran Sean Mosley graduated and leading scorer Terrell Stoglin left the program. In the first example of what would become a Mark Turgeon staple, he cobbled together a roster with transfers and freshman and led the Terrapins to 25 wins and the NIT Semifinals. Alex Len became a breakout star averaging 11.9 points, 7.8 rebounds and 2.1 blocks per game, eventually being drafted 5th overall by the Phoenix Suns following the season. Xavier transfer Dez Wells would become a star in his three years in College Park. He led the team in scoring with 13.1 a game.

Following Alex Len's decision to leave for the NBA, the Terps struggled through what would be their final ACC season falling back to a 17–15 record. In their final ACC regular season game, the Terrapins defeated the 5th ranked Virginia Cavaliers 75–69 in OT at the Comcast Center.

=== Recent success 2014–present ===
In November 2012 ESPN reported that the University of Maryland, a charter member of the ACC, was in "serious negotiations" to join the Big Ten. Yahoo! Sports confirmed the news, and added that Big East Conference member Rutgers University was also in advanced talks to join the Big Ten.

These reports noted that the Big Ten's then-current first-tier media rights deal was set to expire in 2017, and the conference was preparing for negotiations on a new deal. Both potential new members offered access to large new media markets for the conference. The ESPN report stated that Maryland was somewhat torn over the possible move from the ACC to the Big Ten. Two key players for Maryland in the negotiations, president Wallace Loh and athletic director Kevin Anderson, did not have ACC ties, and Loh was a former provost of Big Ten member Iowa. However, the chancellor of the University System of Maryland (USM) that ultimately oversees the school, Brit Kirwan, had been on the College Park campus for 30 years and, according to ESPN, had a strong affinity for the ACC. In addition, one of the Maryland regents told ESPN that Under Armour founder and major Maryland athletic booster Kevin Plank was "100 percent" behind a Big Ten move, and was heavily lobbying regents. On November 19, the Maryland regents voted to accept the Big Ten's offer, and the Big Ten presidents unanimously approved Maryland's entry later that day. The Terrapins officially joined in July 2014.

The athletic department was not in a strong financial position at the time. In July 2012, Maryland dropped seven varsity teams due to a deficit reported by The Washington Post as $4 million. In addition, the ACC voted earlier in 2012 to increase its exit fee to $50 million; the only two members to vote against the increase were Maryland and Florida State. Sources at Maryland believed that the school would be able to negotiate the buyout downward.

The 2014–15 Terrapins were led by senior star Dez Wells and freshman sensation Melo Trimble. Maryland won their first Big Ten basketball game in a 68–66 double overtime thriller at Michigan State. Maryland finished their first Big Ten season with a 14–4 record, finishing second. Turgeon was named Big Ten Coach of the Year. Maryland was selected as a 4 seed in the NCAA tournament. In the First Round Maryland defeated #13 Valparaiso 65–62. In the second round the Terps faced fifth seeded West Virginia and lost 69–59 after Melo Trimble got knocked out of the game with a concussion. Trimble was named a second-team All American by The Sporting News, and both he and Wells were named first team Big Ten.

The 2015–16 Terrapins entered the season with high expectations. Blue chip recruit Diamond Stone and transfers Robert Carter and Rasheed Sulaimon paired up with Melo Trimble and Jake Layman to create a formidable starting 5 for the Terps. The Terrapins were 11–1 entering conference play, featuring wins over Georgetown and UConn and a memorable, competitive 89–81 loss against eventual national runner-up North Carolina at the Dean Smith Center in the ACC/B1G challenge. Maryland got out to a 10–2 record in the Big Ten before losing 4 of the last 6 to finish 3rd in the conference with a 12–6 record. The Terps handled Nebraska 97–86 in the Big Ten tournament quarterfinals in Indianapolis. In the semifinal game the Terps were narrowly defeated by the Michigan State Spartans 64–61. For the NCAA tournament the Terrapins were selected as the No. 5 seed in the South region. They survived the South Dakota State Jackrabbits 79–74 in the first round. In the second round they defeated a Hawaii team hot off of an upset of the 4 seeded California Golden Bears 73–60. In the Sweet 16 they were ousted by a superior Kansas Jayhawks team 79–63. Altogether the 2015–2016 team is regarded as a disappointment given their preseason ranking and the fact that they only reached the Sweet 16. However they put Maryland back on the map nationally and showed that the program was going to be a force in the Big Ten.

The 2016–2017 squad entered the season with many questions. 1st team all Big-Ten point guard Melo Trimble was the only remaining starter, and only 3 other players received significant play time. Lack of depth allowed a freshman trio of Anthony Cowan Jr, Kevin Huerter, and Justin Jackson to start in almost every game. The team finished with a 24–9 season with a conference record of 12–6, finishing 3rd in the Big Ten. The team had many memorable close-fought games including the season finale against Michigan State, when Melo Trimble nailed a game winning 3 with under a second remaining. The team was deemed a 6 seed in the NCAA tournament, getting knocked out in the 1st round to 11 seed Xavier.

2017–2018 saw the Terps without star point guard Melo Trimble but saw Anthony Cowan Jr, Kevin Huerter, and Justin Jackson returning for their sophomore seasons. Despite this and the emergence of star freshman power forward Bruno Fernando the terps struggled to an overall record of 19–13 and 8–10 in what was considered a weak Big Ten. The season featured many close road losses that followed a pattern. This season resulted in the Terps completely missing the postseason for the first time since the 2013–2014 season.

The 2018–2019 season team entered the season with high anticipation locally thanks to returning stars Cowan and Fernando, as well as the addition of the 7th ranked recruiting class in country starring consensus 5-star Jalen "Stix" Smith. Despite a young team, the Terps outperformed national expectations and maintained a top-25 ranking for the entire 2nd half of the season. Maryland finished the 2018-2019 campaign at 22–10 (13–7 in the Big Ten), garnering a #6 seed in the NCAA tournament. The Terps survived a close battle with Dylan Windler led Belmont before losing on the last possession of the game against LSU.

2019–2020 will be remembered as the year the NCAA tournament and most conference tournaments were cancelled due to the COVID-19 pandemic. For the Terps, the cancelled postseason was disappointing with Turgeon assembling his strongest team at Maryland, which finished 24–7 and 14–6 in the Big Ten. Led by first-team All Big Ten selections Anthony Cowan Jr. and Jalen "Stix" Smith, the Terps won a three-way share of the Big Ten regular season conference title, along with Wisconsin and Michigan State the men's program's first conference title since 2010 and its first title in the Big Ten. The Terps were ranked in the AP top ten for 22 weeks during the season, being ranked as high as No. 3 in early December and ending the season at No. 12. The season was highlighted by a 21-point win over a Marquette team, led by first team All-American Markus Howard to win the Orlando Invitational, as well as road wins against Indiana, Illinois, Michigan State, and Minnesota, which memorably ended on Darryl Morsell's deep, buzzer beating three. Indicative of the program's reemergence on the national stage, for just the second time in program history, ESPN's College Gameday returned to College Park in late February for a showdown against pre-season No. 1 Michigan State. Although the Terps lost the game (their only home loss of the season), and struggled in a road loss three days later at Rutgers, they rebounded in their next and final home game against Michigan to capture their share of the conference championship and cut down the nets on Cowan Jr.'s senior night. Although Maryland fans will never know how far the team could have gone in March, the season will be remembered for the championship and Cowan Jr.'s outstanding senior season, which saw him climb to No. 7 all time in program history in points, No. 5 in assists, and included several clutch performances in wins over Illinois and MSU. The season will also be remembered for the national emergence of Smith, who was selected to multiple All-American teams and picked 10th in the 2020 NBA Draft.

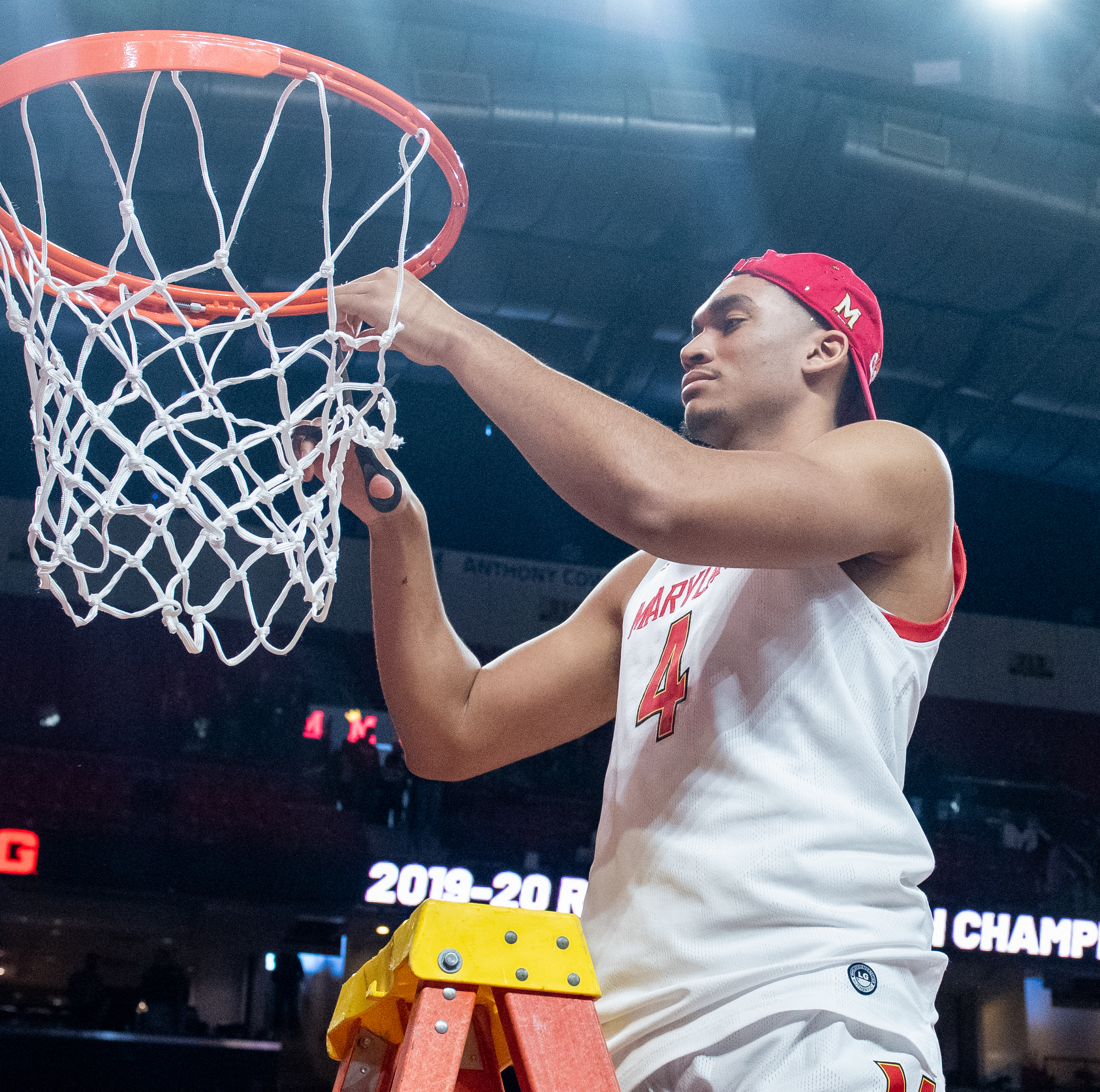
Ricky Lindo cutting down the net for Maryland, March 2020

The program entered the 2020–2021 season with low expectations, primarily due to the departures of stalwarts Anthony Cowan Jr. and Jalen Smith, as well as three transfers in Ricky Lindo Jr., Serrell Smith Jr., and Joshua Tomaic. Jalen Smith's early entry into the 2020 NBA draft was a particular issue for the team, as there were no developed big men in line to take his minutes, a glaring weakness in the Big Ten Conference. Picked to finish 10th in the Big Ten Media Poll, Turgeon had to rely on a core of four returning players, Eric Ayala, Darryl Morsell, Aaron Wiggins, and Donta Scott. Turgeon shored up his roster by securing incoming transfers Jairus Hamilton and Galin Smith. The team finished 17–14 and 9–11 in the Big Ten, good enough for an 8th-place finish in the conference. The Terps won 5 of their last 7 conference games, rising from 4–9 to finish 9–11, and defeated Michigan State 68–57 in the first round of the Big Ten tournament. This late season rally was enough to earn a bid to the 2021 NCAA Division I men's basketball tournament as a 10 seed. Matched against the 7th-seeded 2020–21 UConn Huskies men's basketball team, the team won their first-round game 63–54. They advanced to face 2 seed Alabama, who made 16 three pointers in a 96–77 rout. Aaron Wiggins' performance was a bright spot, as he finished with 27 points. Eric Ayala and Aaron Wiggins received Honorable Mentions for the All-Big Ten teams, and Darryl Morsell won Defensive Player of the Year. On April 7, the University of Maryland announced Mark Turgeon's contract had been extended through the 2025–26 season. On December 3, 2021, Maryland and Turgeon agreed to mutually part ways. Danny Manning was named interim head coach. On March 21, 2022, Maryland hired Kevin Willard to be its tenth head coach in program history. Willard quickly went to the portal for the upcoming season picking up highly touted transfer prospect Jahmir Young from Charlotte. With Young leading the team, Maryland went 20-11, including winning the Hall of Fame Tip-Off tournament. Entering the tournament as an 8-seed, Maryland defeated 9-seeded West Virginia in the first round of the NCAA Tournament. In the second round of the tournament, they faced #1 overall seeded Alabama. They ultimately fell to the Tide 73-51, ending Kevin Willard's first season with an official record of 22-13.

On April 1, 2025, Maryland announced Buzz Williams as the program's new head coach.

== Coaching staff ==
Position	Name
Head Coach:	Buzz Williams
Associate Head Coach:	Devin Johnson
Assistant Coach:	Lyle Wolf
Assistant Coach:	Steve Roccaforte
Assistant Coach:	Wabissa Bede

== Facilities ==
=== Cole Field House (1955–2002) ===
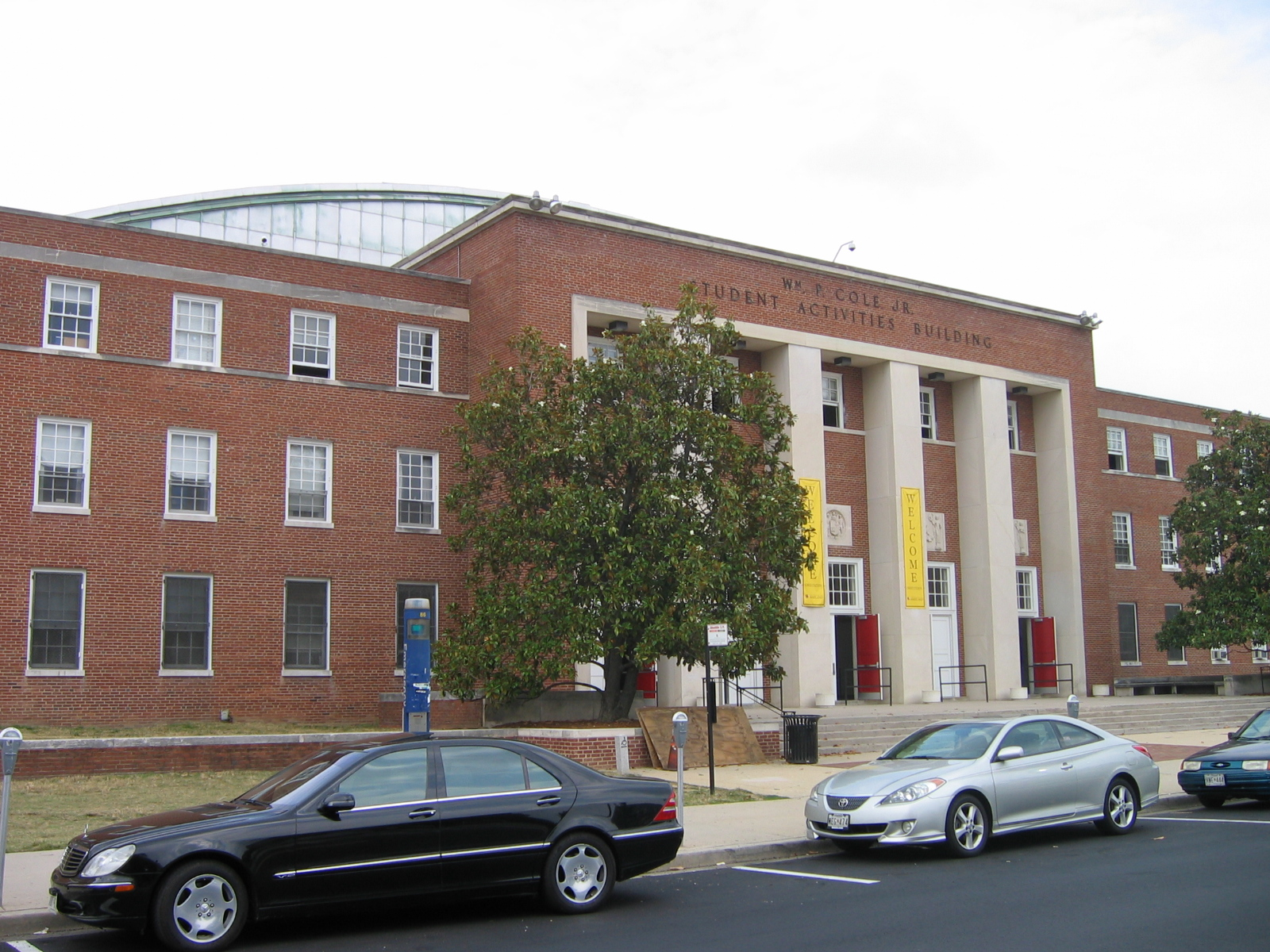
Cole Field House exterior, summer 2007

Prior to 2002, the Terps spent 47 seasons (1955-2002) at Cole Field House. During the period of rapid growth in college basketball from the late 1950s to the late 1970s, it was one of the few college gymnasium on the East Coast with a seating capacity of approximately 12,000. The venue hosted numerous college basketball games during that era, and its seating capacity was increased over the years reaching 14,596 in 1993.

Cole Field House held its first East Regional finals in 1962, when NYU defeated St. John's in the final, 94–85. The Final Four was first held here in 1966 between Duke, Kentucky, Texas Western (now UTEP), and Utah. Texas Western (which started all black players) upset Kentucky's all-white team 72–65 in front of a crowd of 14,253. Future Maryland men's basketball coach Gary Williams, then a student, attended the game. Cole also hosted the Final Four in 1970 and is the nation's only on-campus arena to host multiple Final Fours.

Bud Millikan, the first Maryland coach at the venue, did not like its size saying at one point "It's like playing on a neutral court" with seats too far from the courts. In the late 1960s Lefty Driesell added a nearly 3,000 seats around the court raising the hometown decibel level. Upon adding additional seating to create a more intimate atmosphere with fans right along the court, Cole would develop into one of the best home court advantages in the country. Along with Notre Dame's Joyce Athletic Center, Cole is the site of the most upsets of top ranked opponents of any venue in college basketball. 7 No. 1 ranked teams have been upset inside Cole, with Maryland pulling the upset in 6 of those 7 games and the other being Texas Western's National Championship win over Kentucky in 1966.

Cole Field House was constructed in 1955 at a cost of $3.3 million. On December 2, 1955, Maryland played its first game at Cole beating rival Virginia 67–55. In 1972 the attendance record would be set as 15,287 fans packed into Cole and watched Maryland knock off North Carolina 79–77 in overtime. The final regular season game of the 2001 season at Cole saw Maryland defeat Virginia 102–67 for the most lopsided result in the rivalry's history. In 2002, in a game known amongst Maryland fans as the "Oh, He Steal" game, the 7th #1 ranked team would fall in Cole, as Maryland handed Duke an 87–73 defeat, taking over first place in the conference. Later that season Maryland would play its final game in Cole Field House, celebrating the regular season conference title with a 112–92 win over Virginia. Over 47 seasons, Maryland compiled an impressive 486–151 record at Cole Field House.

=== Xfinity Center (2002–present) ===
The Xfinity Center, which opened in the Fall of 2002, is the current home of the Maryland Terrapins men's and women's basketball programs. The building also features facilities for the wrestling and volleyball programs. The 17,950-seat state of the art on-campus facility is referred to as "The House that Gary Built" or "Comcastle", in reference to the arena's original name of Comcast Center, used from 2002 to July 2014. Xfinity Center provides one of the best home court advantages in the nation. This is largely due to the layout of the 4,000 seat student section which consists of the first ten rows surrounding the court in addition to the west wall of the arena, simply known as "the Wall", which was constructed at a 35-degree incline. Several former ACC opponents referred to the arena as the toughest place to play in the ACC.

Xfinity Center opened for Midnight Madness on October 11, 2002, and the first official men's game was a 64–49 victory over Miami University (Ohio) on November 24, 2002. On January 25, 2012, the court was renamed in honor of Gary Williams, the men's basketball coach who had retired the previous year.

The Xfinity Center welcomed 281,057 visitors over 16 games in its first season for an average of 17,566 which ranked 5th nationally in 2003. It was the first time Maryland had finished in the top 10

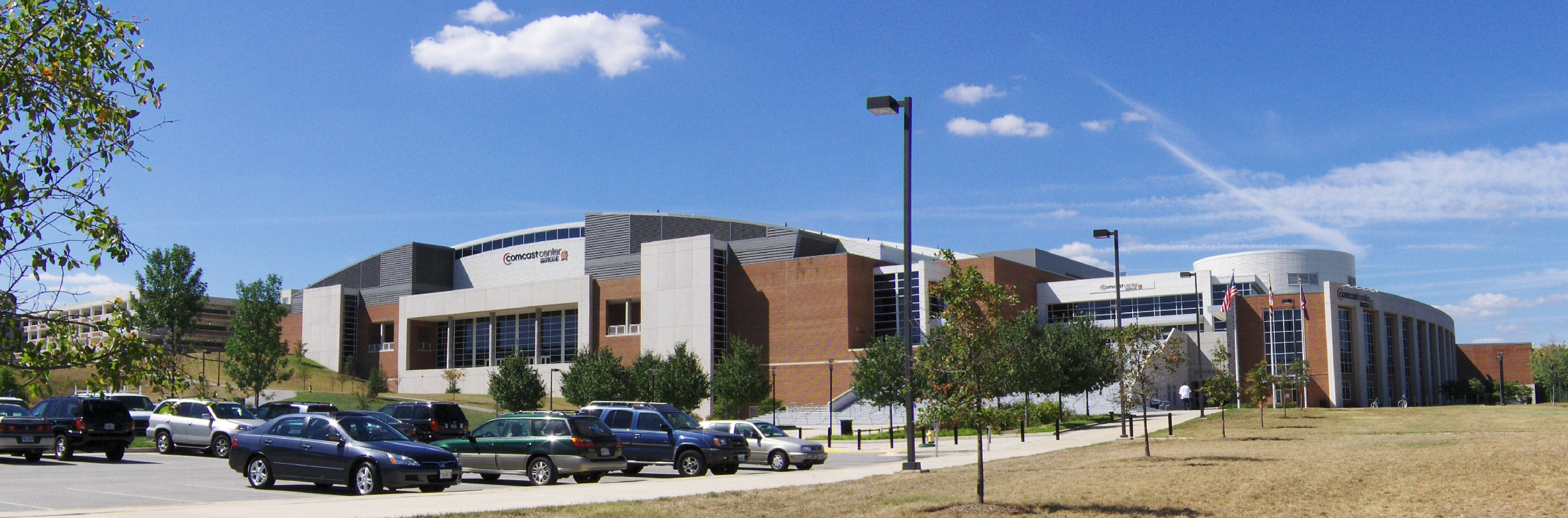
Xfinity Center exterior

nationally in attendance since the 1976 season in which Maryland finished 4th with an average of 13,110 fans taking in games at Cole Field House. Every year from 2004 to 2010, Maryland finished between 4th and 9th nationally in attendance.

At the conclusion of the 2015–2016 season, Maryland is 205–42 (.830) all-time at Xfinity Center. Since 2003, Maryland has defeated 17 ranked opponents at Xfinity Center, including 11 top-ten teams, eight top-5 teams, and a top-ranked team (Duke University in 2003).

=== Barry P. Gossett Basketball Performance Center (2025–present) ===
The Gossett Basketball Performance Center is a basketball practice facility that was completed in 2025 and is located next to Xfinity Center, connected by a tunnel. Barry Gossett donated $21.25 million to the "Maryland Athletics' Building Champions" campaign, out of which came the basketball performance center where the UMD basketball team is able to engage in day-to-day operations. It contains the Butler-Wagner Gymnasium, the Sanders Family Strength and Conditioning Room, artifacts, trophies and interactive touch-screen kiosks. The 45,000-square-foot, three story facility also features a practice court, two locker rooms, two player lounges, a strength and conditioning area, coaches' offices, and meeting rooms.

== Rivalries ==
=== Duke ===
The Duke–Maryland basketball rivalry is a dormant college basketball rivalry between the Duke Blue Devils men's basketball team of Duke University and Maryland Terrapins men's basketball team of the University of Maryland. The basketball series has been called one of the most intense intercollegiate rivalries of modern times by some. A Harris Interactive poll of Marylanders ranked it the third best in the state behind the Commanders–Cowboys and Ravens–Commanders rivalries in 2003 (before the Beltway Series of the Orioles and Nationals was possible). In 2014, Maryland left the ACC for the Big Ten and regular season games between Maryland and Duke are no longer scheduled regularly.

=== Virginia ===
Thanks to the proximity of these two long-time ACC members, and their status as Tobacco Road outsiders, Maryland and Virginia have a long-standing rivalry that spans many decades. Traditionally, these two schools would meet in the last game of the season, and they both acted as spoilers to the other as they sought conference championships and NCAA tournament appearances. This rivalry has been dormant in recent years however, thanks to Maryland's move to the Big Ten Conference, though they did match up in the 2014 ACC-Big Ten Challenge, a 76–65 win for the Cavaliers in College Park, Maryland. On November 28, 2018, the rivalry was again renewed for the ACC-Big Ten Challenge, with Virginia winning by a score of 76–71.

Beginning in the 2025-2026 season, Virginia and Maryland will meet yearly as part of a court-game series, renewing the Terps' oldest and most-played rivalry game. The Terrapins lead the all-time series 107–76.

=== North Carolina ===
The Maryland-North Carolina rivalry peaked in the late 1970s and early 1980s when both programs were fixtures in the AP poll and coaches Lefty Driesell of Maryland and Dean Smith of the Tar Heels patrolled the sidelines. Although the rivalry cooled towards the end of the Terps ACC era, it still produced some memorable moments. The schools reunited for an ACC-Big Ten Challenge matchup in 2015, with the Tar Heels winning the top ten battle 89–82. In 2017 the rivalry was renewed off the court, as part of the wider University of North Carolina academic-athletic scandal. Maryland president Wallace Loh stated that he believed UNC basketball should receive the Death Penalty as punishment. In response UNC coach Roy Williams called Loh a "double idiot".

=== Georgetown ===
Maryland and Georgetown have competed 49 times, the 10th most played opponent all-time for both Georgetown and Maryland. Maryland leads the all-time series 34–15. The two schools played each other every season from 1950 to 1980. The schools stopped playing in 1980 because of bad blood between head coaches John Thompson and Lefty Driesell, the two resumed play for one season in 1993 before taking a 22-game scheduled hiatus. The teams met twice in unplanned games during the gap, 2001 NCAA tournament for a sweet sixteen matchup, and again in 2008 for an Old Spice Classic early season matchup. In 2015 and 2016 the rivalry was renewed for the Gavitt Tipoff Games.

The rivalry will be renewed during the 2025-2026 season as part of a four-year, four-game series.

=== Michigan State ===
Michigan State has emerged as one of Maryland's top rivals since the Terrapins moved to the Big Ten conference in 2014. The two schools have competed 16 times, including twice in the NCAA tournament in 2003 and 2010 while Maryland was still a member of the ACC. Michigan State won both NCAA tournament games by two points each, including a heartbreaking loss in 2010 on a last second three pointer. The 2010 loss struck deep as it ended the stellar 4-year career of Greivis Vásquez and denied coach Williams an open path to a third Final Four. Since Maryland joined the Big Ten, the two teams have produced memorable moments including Melo Trimble's buzzer beating three in his final home game in 2017 and Anthony Cowan Jr.'s three straight threes in the final minutes to close out a comeback win at MSU in 2020. MSU coach Tom Izzo earned the ire of Terp fans in 2015 after complaining that Trimble received too many favorable foul calls during his freshman year, a move that many believe led to officials not calling blatant fouls against Trimble in his sophomore and junior seasons. Adding to the Terps' tourney heartbreaks against Sparty, MSU won conference tournament semi-finals against Maryland in 2015 and 2016 by a combined seven points, the latter of which ended on a non-call when Trimble was apparently fouled driving to the basket down one point with two seconds left. Adding to the last second heartbreaks Tre Holloman hit a last second buzzer beater from beyond halfcourt to beat Maryland 58-55. Michigan State currently leads the all-time series 17–8.

=== Michigan ===
A rivalry has begun to brew between the Maryland Terrapins and the Michigan Wolverines. Since Maryland joined the Big Ten, both teams have been contending for the conference championship, with Maryland coming out on top in 2020, and Michigan topping the table in 2021. The rivalry advanced during the 2020–2021 season. Star Michigan freshman Hunter Dickinson, who played high school basketball close to Maryland's campus, made comments that he felt "disrespected" by the Terps for having not recruited him and other DMV players harder while they were in high school. In his first game against the Terps, he scored 26 points, and frequently stared down the Maryland bench and Coach Turgeon. Michigan went to claim the regular season title. However, tensions boiled over in their match-up in the 2021 Big Ten Men's Basketball Championship, where head coach Juwan Howard was ejected after receiving a double technical after an altercation with Mark Turgeon and the Terrapin team. Howard claimed that Turgeon "charged at him" and made derogatory comments about him and the University of Michigan Basketball scandal, but Turgeon refuted those claims, saying "I stood up for myself and my program and said 'Don't talk to me', and then [the situation] escalated. The all-time series is 10–14, leaning to Michigan.

=== Wisconsin ===
Wisconsin has also emerged as one of Maryland's top rivals since the Terrapins have joined the Big Ten in 2014. While Maryland was still in the ACC, Wisconsin and Maryland played in the Big Ten/ACC Challenge in Milwaukee in November of 2000, where Wisconsin won by 3 in overtime. The two teams also met in the second round of the 2002 NCAA Tournament, which Maryland won by 30 points before going on to win its first National Championship. Once Maryland joined the Big Ten, the schools continued to deliver exciting games. For example, #14 Maryland beat #5 Wisconsin in 2015, but in 2016, they split their series, each delivering the other crushing defeats in their home arenas which included a Melo Trimble game-winning 3 pointer and a confrontation between Diamond Stone and Vitto Brown. Wisconsin knocked Maryland out of the Big Ten Tournament in 2018, a trend which continued into 2024. In their lone meeting of the 2019-2020 season, #17 Maryland lost on a buzzer beater to unranked Wisconsin, and both teams would go on to win shares of the 2020 Big Ten Regular Season title. Unranked Maryland beat #6 Wisconsin in the 2020-21 season, but Wisconsin would go on to win the next 3 match-ups. In 2025, Unranked Maryland and their beloved "Crab Five" beat #17 Wisconsin at home during their Gold Rush game, and would prevail ahead of them in the final Big Ten standings by 1 game, as both teams enjoyed strong seasons. The schools have met 24 times, with a 9-15 series leaning to Wisconsin.

== Historical statistics ==
Overall
Years of basketball	102
1st season	1904–05
Head coaches (all-time)	10
All games
All-time record	1,678–1,109
20+ win seasons	32
30+ win seasons	1
ACC games
ACC W-L record	418–397
ACC titles	3
Big Ten games
Big Ten W-L record	118–90
Big Ten titles	0
NCAA tournament
NCAA appearances	30*
NCAA W-L record	44–29*
Sweet Sixteen	14
Elite Eight	4
Final Four	2
National championships	1

*1988 tournament records vacated by NCAA due to use of ineligible player

== Record against Big Ten opponents ==
Opponent	Series record	W-L%
Illinois	17–10	.630
Indiana	10–13	.435
Iowa	11–10	.524
Michigan	9–13	.409
Michigan State	8–18	.308
Minnesota	18–3	.857
Nebraska	14–5	.737
Northwestern	13–8	.619
Ohio State	11–13	.458
Oregon	1–2	.333
Penn State	19–15	.559
Purdue	6–11	.353
Rutgers	15–9	.625
UCLA	4–8	.333
USC	4–1	.800
Washington	1–1	.500
Wisconsin	9–14	.391
Total	170–154	.525

Totals through March 17, 2026

== Post-season results ==
=== NCAA tournament ===
NCAA appearances	30
Overall record	44–29
National championships	1 (2002)
Final Fours	2 (2001, 2002)
Elite Eights	4 (1973, 1975, 2001, 2002)
Sweet Sixteens	15 (1958, 1973, 1975, 1980, 1984, 1985, 1994, 1995, 1998, 1999, 2001, 2002, 2003, 2016, 2025)

=== Complete NCAA tournament results ===
The Terrapins have appeared in the NCAA tournament 31* (30) times. Their combined record is 46–30* (45–29). They were National Champions in 2002.

Year	Seed	Round	Opponent	Results
1958		First Round; Sweet Sixteen; Regional 3rd Place Game	Boston College; Temple; Manhattan	W 86–63; L 71–67; W 59–55
1973		Sweet Sixteen; Elite Eight	Syracuse; Providence	W 91–75; L 89–103
1975		First Round; Sweet Sixteen; Elite Eight	Creighton; Notre Dame; Louisville	W 83–79; W 83–71; L 82–96
1980	#2	Second Round; Sweet Sixteen	#7 Tennessee #3 Georgetown	W 86–75; L 68–74
1981	#6	First Round; Second Round	#11 Chattanooga #3 Indiana	W 81–69; L 64–99
1983	#8	First Round; Second Round	#9 Chattanooga #1 Houston	W 52–51; L 50–60
1984	#3	Second Round; Sweet Sixteen	#11 West Virginia #2 Illinois	W 102–77; L 70–72
1985	#5	First Round; Second Round; Sweet Sixteen	#12 Miami (OH) #13 Navy #8 Villanova	W 69–68 ^{OT} W 64–59; L 43–46
1986	#5	First Round; Second Round	#12 Pepperdine #4 UNLV	W 69–64; L 64–70
1988*	#7	First Round; Second Round	#10 UC Santa Barbara #2 Kentucky	W 92–82; L 81–90
1994	#10	First Round; Second Round; Sweet Sixteen	#7 Saint Louis #2 Massachusetts #3 Michigan	W 74–66; W 95–87; L 71–78
1995	#3	First Round; Second Round; Sweet Sixteen	#14 Gonzaga #11 Texas #2 Connecticut	W 87–63; W 82–68; L 89–99
1996	#7	First Round	#10 Santa Clara	L 79–91
1997	#5	First Round	#12 College of Charleston	L 66–75
1998	#4	First Round; Second Round; Sweet Sixteen	#13 Utah State #5 Illinois #1 Arizona	W 82–68; W 67–61; L 79–87
1999	#2	First Round; Second Round; Sweet Sixteen	#15 Valparaiso #10 Creighton #3 St. John's	W 82–60; W 75–63; L 62–76
2000	#3	First Round; Second Round	#14 Iona #6 UCLA	W 74–59; L 70–105
2001	#3	First Round; Second Round; Sweet Sixteen; Elite Eight; Final Four	#14 George Mason #11 Georgia State #10 Georgetown #1 Stanford #1 Duke	W 83–80; W 79–60; W 76–66; W 87–73; L 84–95
2002	#1	First Round; Second Round; Sweet Sixteen; Elite Eight; Final Four; National Championship Game	#16 Siena #8 Wisconsin #4 Kentucky #2 Connecticut #1 Kansas #5 Indiana	W 85–70; W 87–57; W 78–68; W 90–82; W 97–88; W 64–52
2003	#6	First Round; Second Round; Sweet Sixteen	#11 UNC Wilmington #3 Xavier #7 Michigan State	W 75–73; W 77–64; L 58–60
2004	#4	First Round; Second Round	#13 UTEP #5 Syracuse	W 86–83; L 70–72
2007	#4	First Round; Second Round	#13 Davidson #5 Butler	W 82–70; L 59–62
2009	#10	First Round; Second Round	#7 California #2 Memphis	W 84–71; L 89–70
2010	#4	First Round; Second Round	#13 Houston #5 Michigan State	W 89–77; L 83–85
2015	#4	First Round; Second Round	#13 Valparaiso #5 West Virginia	W 65–62; L 59–69
2016	#5	First Round; Second Round; Sweet Sixteen	#12 South Dakota State #13 Hawaii #1 Kansas	W 79–74; W 73–60; L 63–79
2017	#6	First Round	#11 Xavier	L 65–76
2019	#6	First Round; Second Round	#11 Belmont #3 LSU	W 79–77; L 67–69
2021	#10	First Round; Second Round	#7 UConn #2 Alabama	W 63–54; L 77–96
2023	#8	First Round; Second Round	#9 West Virginia #1 Alabama	W 67–65; L 51–73
2025	#4	First Round; Second Round; Sweet Sixteen	#13 Grand Canyon #12 Colorado State #1 Florida	W 81–49; W 72-71; L 71–87

* 1988 tournament records vacated by NCAA due to use of ineligible player

Seed History

The NCAA began seeding the tournament with the 1979 edition.

Year	1980	1981	1983	1984	1985	1986	1988	1994	1995	1996	1997	1998	1999	2000	2001	2002	2003	2004	2007	2009	2010	2015	2016	2017	2019	2021	2023	2025
Seed	2	6	8	3	5	5	7	10	3	7	5	4	2	3	3	1	6	4	4	10	4	4	5	6	6	10	8	4

=== NIT results ===
The Terrapins have appeared in the National Invitation Tournament (NIT) eight times. Their combined record is 14–7. They were NIT champions in 1972.

Year	Round	Opponent	Result
1972	First Round; Quarterfinals; Semifinals; Final	Saint Joseph's; Syracuse; Jacksonville; Niagara	W 67–55; W 71–65; W 91–77; W 100–69
1979	First Round; Second Round	Rhode Island; Ohio State	W 67–65; L 72–79
1982	First Round; Second Round	Richmond; Georgia	W 60–50; L 69–83
1990	First Round; Second Round	Massachusetts; Penn State	W 91–81; L 78–80
2005	First Round; Second Round; Quarterfinals; Semifinals	Oral Roberts; Davidson; TCU; South Carolina	W 85–72; W 78–63; W 85–73; L 67–75
2006	First Round	Manhattan	L 84–87
2008	First Round; Second Round	Minnesota; Syracuse	W 68–58; L 72–88
2013	First Round; Second Round; Quarterfinals; Semifinals	Niagara; Denver; Alabama; Iowa	W 86–70; W 62–52; W 58–57; L 60–71

== National honors ==
Naismith College Player of the Year
1995	Joe Smith
Helms Foundation All-American
1931	Louis Berger
1932	Louis Berger
First Team All-American
1975	John Lucas
1976	John Lucas
1980	Albert King
1986	Len Bias
1995	Joe Smith
2002	Juan Dixon
Second Team All-American
1973	Tom McMillen
1974	John Lucas, Len Elmore, Tom McMillen
1981	Albert King
1985	Len Bias
1992	Walt Williams
1999	Steve Francis
2010	Greivis Vásquez
2015	Melo Trimble
Third Team All-American
1972	Tom McMillen
1994	Joe Smith
1997	Keith Booth
2001	Juan Dixon
2020	Jalen Smith
First Team All-ACC
1954	Gene Shue
1960	Al Bunge
1972	Tom McMillen
1973	Tom McMillen
1974	John Lucas
1974	Len Elmore
1975	John Lucas
1976	John Lucas
1980	Albert King*
1985	Len Bias*
1986	Len Bias*
1987	Derrick Lewis
1992	Walt Williams
1994	Joe Smith
1995	Joe Smith*
1997	Keith Booth
1999	Steve Francis, Terence Morris
2000	Juan Dixon, Lonny Baxter
2001	Juan Dixon, Lonny Baxter
2002	Juan Dixon*
2003	Steve Blake
2010	Greivis Vásquez*
2011	Jordan Williams
* ACC Player of the Year
First Team All-Big Ten
2015	Dez Wells, Melo Trimble
2017	Melo Trimble
2019	Bruno Fernando
2020	Anthony Cowan Jr., Jalen Smith
2024	Jahmir Young
2025	Derik Queen

== International honors ==
- 1974 FIBA Intercontinental Cup: Winners

== Honored jerseys ==
Note: the numbers are not retired and can be worn by other players.

No.	Player	Career	Hometown
3	Juan Dixon	1999–2002	Baltimore, Maryland
6	Bosey Berger	1929–1932	Baltimore, Maryland
15	John Lucas	1973–1976	Durham, North Carolina
15	Johnny Rhodes	1992–1996	Washington, D.C.
21	Greivis Vásquez	2006–2010	Caracas, Venezuela
22	Keith Booth	1993–1997	Baltimore, Maryland
23	Steve Francis	1998–1999	Takoma Park, Maryland
25	Steve Blake	1999–2003	Miami Lakes, Florida
25	Ernie Graham	1978–1981	Baltimore, Maryland
25	Gene Shue	1952–1954	Baltimore, Maryland
32	Joe Smith	1993–1995	Norfolk, Virginia
34	Len Bias	1983–1986	Landover, Maryland
35	Lonny Baxter	1999–2002	Silver Spring, Maryland
41	Len Elmore	1972–1974	Springfield Gardens, New York
42	Walt Williams	1989–1992	Temple Hills, Maryland
52	Buck Williams	1979–1981	Rocky Mount, North Carolina
54	Tom McMillen	1972–1974	Mansfield, Pennsylvania
55	Albert King	1978–1981	Brooklyn, New York

== NBA Draft picks ==
Year	Round	Pick	Name	Team	Games in NBA
2025	1	13	Derik Queen	Atlanta Hawks	81
2021	2	55	Aaron Wiggins	Oklahoma City Thunder	384
2020	1	10	Jalen Smith	Phoenix Suns	337
2019	2	34	Bruno Fernando	Philadelphia 76ers	226
2018	1	19	Kevin Huerter	Atlanta Hawks	586
2018	2	43	Justin Jackson	Denver Nuggets	0
2016	2	40	Diamond Stone	New Orleans Pelicans	7
2016	2	47	Jake Layman	Orlando Magic	243
2013	1	5	Alex Len	Phoenix Suns	704
2011	2	36	Jordan Williams	New Jersey Nets	43
2010	1	28	Greivis Vásquez	New Orleans Hornets	401
2008	2	57	James Gist	San Antonio Spurs	0
2007	2	59	D. J. Strawberry	Phoenix Suns	33
2003	2	38	Steve Blake	Washington Wizards	870
2002	1	8	Chris Wilcox	Los Angeles Clippers	628
2002	1	17	Juan Dixon	Washington Wizards	436
2002	2	44	Lonny Baxter	Chicago Bulls	162
2001	2	34	Terence Morris	Atlanta Hawks	139
1999	1	2	Steve Francis	Vancouver Grizzlies	576
1999	2	37	Obinna Ekezie	Vancouver Grizzlies	143
1999	2	38	Laron Profit	Orlando Magic	135
1997	1	28	Keith Booth	Chicago Bulls	45
1995	1	1	Joe Smith	Golden State Warriors	1,030
1993	2	31	Evers Burns	Sacramento Kings	23
1992	1	7	Walt Williams	Sacramento Kings	708
1990	1	17	Jerrod Mustaf	New York Knicks	179
1990	2	43	Tony Massenburg	San Antonio Spurs	683
1988	3	62	Derrick Lewis	Chicago Bulls	0
1986	1	2	Len Bias	Boston Celtics	0 (Died 2 days after being drafted)
1985	2	46	Adrian Branch	Chicago Bulls	130
1984	2	37	Ben Coleman	Chicago Bulls	227
1982	3	61	Charles Pittman	Phoenix Suns	234
1981	1	3	Buck Williams	New Jersey Nets	1,307
1981	1	10	Albert King	New Jersey Nets	534
1978	4	81	Lawrence Boston	Washington Bullets	13
1977	1	15	Brad Davis	Los Angeles Lakers	961
1977	2	30	Steve Sheppard	Chicago Bulls	106
1976	1	1	John Lucas	Houston Rockets	928
1976	2	32	Mo Howard	Cleveland Cavaliers	32
1974	1	9	Tom McMillen	Buffalo Braves	729
1974	1	13	Len Elmore	Washington Bullets	658
1973	3	37	Jim O'Brien	Cleveland Cavaliers	0 (58 in ABA)
1971	8	131	Barry Yates	Philadelphia 76ers	24
1963	3	24	Jerry Greenspan	Syracuse Nationals	25
1960	1	7	Al Bunge	Philadelphia Warriors	0
1954	1	3	Gene Shue	Philadelphia Warriors	699

== Other notable players ==
- Šarūnas Jasikevičius, professional basketball player and coach, EuroLeague champion (4× as a player, 1× as a coach)
- Terence Morris, NBA and Israel Basketball Premier League basketball player
- Melo Trimble, professional basketball player in the Basketbol Süper Ligi of Turkey
- Qudus Wahab (born 2000), basketball player for Maccabi Ashdod of the Israeli Basketball Premier League

== Statistical leaders ==
=== Career leaders ===
==== Points ====
Points	Name	Games	Career
2,269	Juan Dixon	141	1998–2002
2,171	Greivis Vasquez	136	2006–10
2,149	Len Bias	131	1982–86
2,058	Albert King	118	1977–81
2,017	Adrian Branch	123	1981–85
2,015	John Lucas	110	1972–76
1,881	Anthony Cowan Jr.	130	2016–20
1,858	Lonny Baxter	138	1998–2002
1,807	Tom McMillen	88	1971–74
1,776	Keith Booth	126	1993–97
1,743	Johnny Rhodes	122	1992–96
1,733	Terence Morris	136	1997–2001
1,704	Walt Williams	105	1988–92
1,690	Donta Scott	162	2019–24
1,658	Melo Trimble	104	2014–17
1,607	Ernest Graham	118	1977–81
1,573	Nik Caner-Medley	127	2002–06
1,566	Laron Profit	125	1995–99
1,561	Greg Manning	118	1977–81
1,458	Derrick Lewis	127	1984–88
1,449	Eric Ayala	125	2018–22
1,436	Jake Layman	141	2012–16
1,414	James Gist	130	2004–08

==== Assists ====
Assists	Name	Games	Career
972	Steve Blake	138	2000–03
772	Greivis Vasquez	136	2006–10
649	Keith Gatlin	122	1984–86, 1988
590	Terrell Stokes	128	1996–99
584	Anthony Cowan Jr.	130	2016–20
514	John Lucas	110	1973–76
513	Eric Hayes	133	2006–10
483	Duane Simpkins	119	1993–96
469	Kevin Mclinton	91	1990–93
460	Dutch Morley	120	1979–82
437	Johnny Rhodes	122	1993–96
433	Brad Davis	84	1975–77
410	Walt Williams	105	1989–92
403	Melo Trimble	104	2014–17
371	Juan Dixon	141	1999–2002
364	John Gilchrist	91	2002–05
360	Jeff Adkins	128	1981–85
346	Ernest Graham	118	1978–81
326	Exree Hipp	121	1992–96
317	D. J. Strawberry	111	2003–07
307	Drew Nicholas	138	1999–2003
304	Albert King	118	1977–81

==== Rebounds ====
Rebounds	Name	Games	Career
1,053	Len Elmore	86	1972–74
998	Lonny Baxter	138	1999–2002
948	Derrick Lewis	127	1985–88
940	Julian Reese	125	2021–25
928	Buck Williams	85	1979–81
925	Terence Morris	136	1998–2001
916	Keith Booth	126	1994–97
895	Larry Gibson	101	1976–79
859	Tom McMillen	88	1972–74
795	Al Bunge	75	1958–60
783	James Gist	130	2005–08
781	Ekene Ibekwe	127	2004–07
745	Len Bias	131	1983–86
722	Tony Massenburg	112	1986, 1988–90
