= Bob Wade (basketball) =

American football player and basketball coach (born 1944)

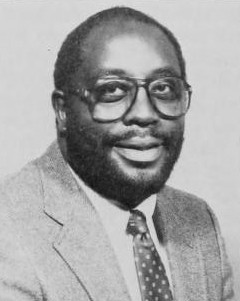
- Wade in 1988

Biographical details
- Born: December 9, 1944 (age 81); Baltimore, Maryland, U.S.
- Education: Morgan State University

Playing career
- 1968: Pittsburgh Steelers
- 1969: Washington Redskins
- 1970: Denver Broncos
- Position: Defensive back

Coaching career (HC unless noted)
- 1971–1974: Edmondson HS
- 1975–1986: Dunbar HS
- 1986–1989: Maryland

Head coaching record
- Overall: 272–24 (Dunbar High School); 36–50 (College)

Accomplishments and honors

Awards
- USA Today Coach of the Year – 1983

Robert Pernell Wade (born December 9, 1944) is an American former professional football player and college basketball coach. He was the men's college basketball head coach for the University of Maryland (1986–1989), as well as a defensive back in the National Football League (NFL).

He was also the athletics coordinator of the Baltimore City Public School System from 1996 to 2015.

== Football career ==
Bob Wade
Personal information
- Listed height: 6 ft 2 in (1.88 m)
- Listed weight: 200 lb (91 kg)

Career information
- Position: Defensive back (No. 44, 24, 37)
- High school: Dunbar (Baltimore, Maryland)
- College: Morgan State
- NFL draft: 1967: 15th round, 385th overall pick

Career history
- Pittsburgh Steelers (1968); Washington Redskins (1969); Denver Broncos (1970)

Career NFL statistics
- Games played: 30
- Interceptions: 1
- Interception yards: 24
- Fumble recoveries: 1
- Stats at Pro Football Reference

Wade played college football at Morgan State University. After his collegiate career, he played in the NFL as a defensive back for the Pittsburgh Steelers (1968), the Washington Redskins (1969), and the Denver Broncos (1970). He was released by the Redskins during training camp on September 1, 1970.

== Basketball coaching career ==
After his football career ended, Wade spent four years coaching basketball at Edmondson High School. Prior to his coaching stint at Maryland, Wade coached at Baltimore's Dunbar High School for ten years, where he compiled a 341–25 record and was often ranked in the nation's top 10. In his best two seasons at the inner-city high school, 1981–1983, Wade put together teams that produced a 60–0 record, the second of which was ranked first in the nation by USA Today. His 1981–82 team produced four future NBA players – three of them first-round draft picks – including Boston Celtics captain Reggie Lewis, who was the high school's team's sixth man, and 5'-3" Tyrone "Muggsy" Bogues, who had a 14-year NBA career despite being the shortest player in league history. The other two future NBA players were David Wingate and Reggie Williams, who also combined to win an NCAA championship at Georgetown in 1984.

Wade was originally hired to replace Lefty Driesell, Maryland's basketball coach of 17 years. Driesell resigned over concerns about the death of All-American forward Len Bias and subsequent revelations about his players' academic performances. Wade and Driesell had a frosty relationship, and Wade had consistently said he hadn't wanted Dunbar prospects to play for Driesell at Maryland—facts not overlooked by commentators. Wade was known as a strong disciplinarian, and he was appealing to Maryland administrators who were attempting to clean up the basketball program's image. He was also hired in order to increase diversity, as he became the first African American coach of a major sport in the Atlantic Coast Conference (ACC), despite the fact that he had no prior experience in coaching a team at the collegiate level.

Wade walked into a difficult situation. Not only was he hired just days before the start of the 1986–87 season, but he had to deal with the loss of several players suspended after the Len Bias incident. The result was one of the worst seasons in school history. The Terps suffered their only winless record in ACC play, as part of an overall 9–17 record. Wade quickly rebuilt the team and got the Terps back into the NCAA tournament a year later. Due to the transfer of star players Brian Williams and Steve Hood, the team significantly regressed in 1988–89, losing 20 games, the most in school history. Wade was forced to resign on May 12, 1989, after only three years as head coach, compiling a 36–50 record, including only seven wins in ACC play. His resignation came amid allegations that he broke NCAA rules in dealing with players and recruits. While criticized for his coaching abilities, his ability to recruit was not in question. In only two years of recruiting (he was hired too late for any serious recruiting his first year), Wade landed three NBA first round draft picks in Brian Williams, Jerrod Mustaf and Walt Williams.

An investigation found that, among other things, Wade had provided a loan to one of his recruits and provided free clothes to his players. More seriously, Wade lied to the NCAA on several occasions, and even went as far as to hold a meeting with his staff to coordinate plans to lie to the NCAA. In one of the toughest penalties handed out by the NCAA for such transgressions, the Terps were placed on three years' probation, banned from postseason play in 1991 and 1992 and kicked off live television for the 1990–91 season. Their 1988 NCAA Tournament appearance was also scrubbed from the books due to ineligible players. Wade himself was hit with a five-year show-cause order, which effectively blackballed him from the collegiate ranks until 1995.

== Coaching record ==
Record table
Season	Team	Overall	Conference	Standing	Postseason
Maryland Terrapins (Atlantic Coast Conference) (1986–1989)
1986–87	Maryland	9–17	0–14	8th	
1987–88	Maryland	18–13*	6–8	5th	NCAA round of 32
1988–89	Maryland	9–20	1–13	8th	
Maryland:		36–50^ (.419)	7–35 (.167)		
Total:		36–50 (.419)			
National champion Postseason invitational champion Conference regular season champion Conference regular season and conference tournament champion Division regular season champion Division regular season and conference tournament champion Conference tournament champion

* 1988 NCAA Tournament appearance was vacated due to ineligible players; official record is 17–12.
^ Record at Maryland is 35–49 (7–35 ACC) without vacated games.
