= Burton Shipley =

American athlete and coach (1890–1976)

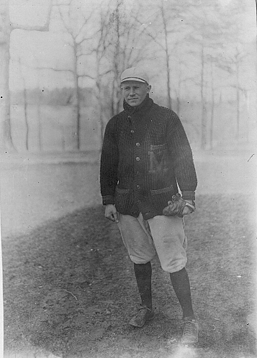
- Shipley as an undergraduate of the Maryland Agricultural College in 1914

Biographical details
- Born: January 17, 1890; Anne Arundel County, Maryland, U.S.
- Died: February 22, 1976 (aged 86); Washington, D.C., U.S.

Playing career
- 1908–1913: Maryland
- Position: Quarterback

Coaching career (HC unless noted)

Football
- 1917: Marshall
- 1919–1920: Delaware
- 1923–1926?: Maryland (assistant)

Basketball
- 1918–1922: Delaware
- 1923–1947: Maryland

Baseball
- 1918: Marshall
- 1919–1922: Delaware
- 1924–1960: Maryland

Administrative career (AD unless noted)
- 1917–1919: Marshall
- 1919–1922: Delaware

Head coaching record
- Overall: 6–17–3 (football); 288–237 (basketball); 399–333–10 (baseball)

Howard Burton Shipley (January 17, 1890 – February 22, 1976) was an American multi-sport athlete and coach for the Maryland Terrapins at the University of Maryland. He is probably most remembered as the first and long-time head coach of the men's basketball team. He also coached the Maryland baseball team.

Shipley graduated from the Maryland Agricultural College (now the University of Maryland) in 1914. While there, he played basketball, baseball, and football as a quarterback. In 1923, he became the head coach for the Maryland basketball team, a position in which he served until 1947. During his tenure, he compiled a 243–199 record.

In 1917, Shipley served as the head football coach at Marshall University in Huntington, West Virginia. In December 1918, he was appointed athletic director and coach of football, basketball, and baseball at Delaware College—now known as the University of Delaware.

Also in 1923, Shipley was hired as an assistant coach for the football team under legendary Maryland head coach Curley Byrd. Shipley also coached the baseball team from 1924 to 1960.

Shipley Field, where the school's baseball team plays its home games, is named after him. In 1982, Shipley was inducted into the University of Maryland Athletic Hall of Fame.

== Head coaching record ==
=== Football ===
Year	Team	Overall	Conference	Standing	Bowl/playoffs
Marshall Thundering Herd (Independent) (1917)
1917	Marshall	1–7–1			
Marshall:		1–7–1			
Delaware Fightin' Blue Hens (Independent) (1919–1920)
1919	Delaware	2–5–1			
1920	Delaware	3–5–1			
Delaware:		5–10–2			
Total:		6–17–3			
