= Bud Millikan =

American basketball player and coach

- Millikan after the 1958 ACC tournament championship

Biographical details
- Born: October 12, 1920; Maryville, Missouri, U.S.
- Died: January 28, 2010 (aged 89); Roswell, Georgia, U.S.

Playing career
- 1939–1942: Oklahoma A&M
- Position: Guard

Coaching career (HC unless noted)
- 1950–1967: Maryland

Head coaching record
- Overall: 242–181
- Tournaments: 2–1 (NCAA)

Accomplishments and honors

Championships
- ACC tournament (1958)

Awards
- 1942 All-American (Helms)

Herman A. "Bud" Millikan (October 12, 1920 – January 28, 2010) was the head coach of the University of Maryland Terrapins men's basketball team from 1950 to 1967. He compiled a 243–182 record.

== Early life ==
Millikan was born in Maryville, Missouri, and played on the Maryville High School basketball team that won the 1937 Missouri State High School Basketball Championship at a time when there were no divisions in state tournament play. He married his high school sweetheart Maxine.

== Coaching career ==
Millikan followed Henry Iba, who had coached at Northwest Missouri State University while Millikan was growing up in Maryville, to Oklahoma A&M. At Oklahoma State he was an All-American, president of the student body, and captain of the baseball and basketball teams. He was an assistant coach to Iba in its 1944 National Championship team. Iba gave him the nickname "Buddy," which was shortened to "Bud." Millikan who had been a member of the Oklahoma State ROTC did not serve in World War II because of asthma. He returned to coach at Maryville High School and later other schools in Iowa. Iba arranged the meeting that brought Millikan to Maryland. After Iba returned to Missouri after the interview, it was announced on the radio that Millikan had accepted an offer from Southwest Missouri State University, although in fact he had not formally accepted the offer. It prompted Maryland to tell him they could pay him more.

Among Millikan's players at Maryland were Gary Williams and Joe Harrington. Williams in his autobiography “Sweet Redemption” wrote, “I played for a first-rate coach in Bud Millikan, but after that, nothing was first-rate in the Maryland basketball program…You couldn’t play for Bud Millikan unless you were willing to play hard on the defensive end of the court. In practice, we would practice two and half hours of defense and spend about ten minutes on offense.” According to the Daytona Beach Morning Journal, Millikan was "praised for his coaching ability but criticized as a recruiter of talent."

Millikan coached the team to an NCAA Elite 8 appearance in 1958. During his time Cole Field House was built. Millikan did not like the size of the field house, saying at one point "It's like playing on a neutral court" with seats too far from the courts. His successor Lefty Driesell added a few thousand seats around the court, raising the hometown decibel level.

Every senior who played for Millikan graduated from the school. He imposed a discipline where players were required to wear the team blazer when traveling, and in warm-ups players wore towels around their necks in an ascot-like manner.

Millikan resigned as the Maryland coach in 1967 and was replaced by his assistant Frank Fellows.

Millikan died in Roswell, Georgia, on January 28, 2010, at the age of 89.

== Head coaching record ==
Record table
Season	Team	Overall	Conference	Standing	Postseason
Maryland Terrapins (Southern Conference) (1950–1953)
1950–51	Maryland	15–10	11–8	8th	
1951–52	Maryland	13–9	9–5	T–6th	
1952–53	Maryland	15–8	12–3	T–2nd	
Maryland Terrapins (Atlantic Coast Conference) (1953–1967)
1953–54	Maryland	23–7	7–2	2nd	
1954–55	Maryland	17–7	10–4	3rd	
1955–56	Maryland	14–10	7–7	5th	
1956–57	Maryland	16–10	9–5	2nd	
1957–58	Maryland	22–7	9–5	4th	NCAA Regional Third Place
1958–59	Maryland	10–13	7–7	T–3rd	
1959–60	Maryland	15–8	9–5	3rd	
1960–61	Maryland	14–12	6–8	5th	
1961–62	Maryland	8–17	3–11	7th	
1962–63	Maryland	8–13	4–10	T–6th	
1963–64	Maryland	9–17	5–9	6th	
1964–65	Maryland	18–8	10–4	T–2nd	
1965–66	Maryland	14–11	7–7	5th	
1966–67	Maryland	11–14	4–10	7th	
Maryland:		242–181	129–110		
Total:		242–181			
National champion Postseason invitational champion Conference regular season champion Conference regular season and conference tournament champion Division regular season champion Division regular season and conference tournament champion Conference tournament champion
