= Frank Fellows (basketball) =

American basketball coach

Frank Fellows was the head coach of the Maryland Terrapins men's basketball team from 1967 to 1969. He compiled a 16–34 record. He never made an appearance in the NCAA tournament. He was a player for the Maryland Terrapins men's basketball from 1950 to 1953.
