= List of University of Maryland, College Park people =

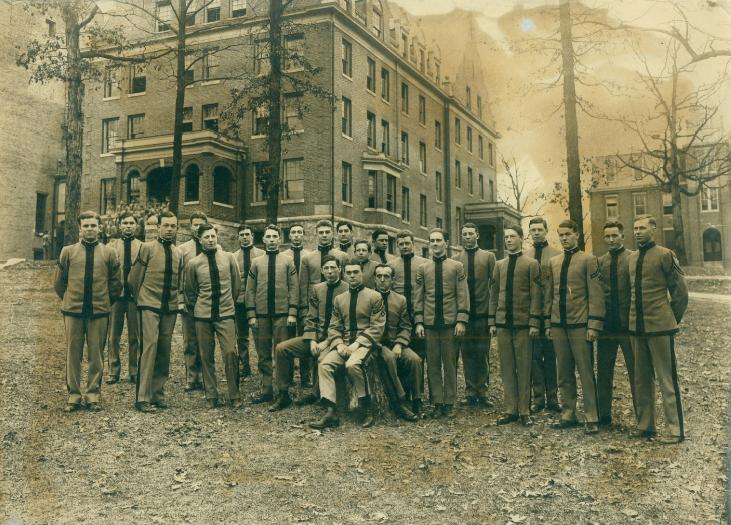
The Maryland Agricultural College Class of 1912

This is a list of notable alumni, faculty, and benefactors of the University of Maryland, College Park.

== Academia ==
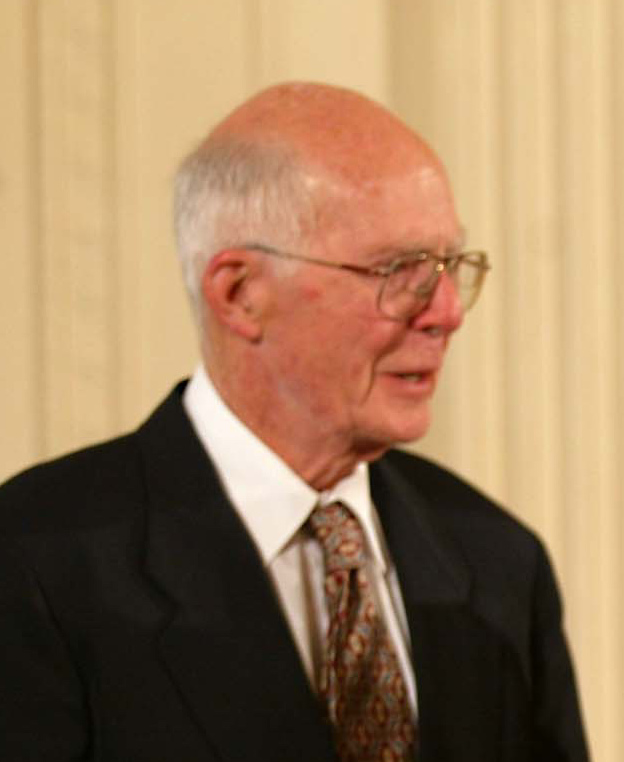
Raymond Davis, Jr. (B.S., M.S.); 2002 Nobel Prize in Physics

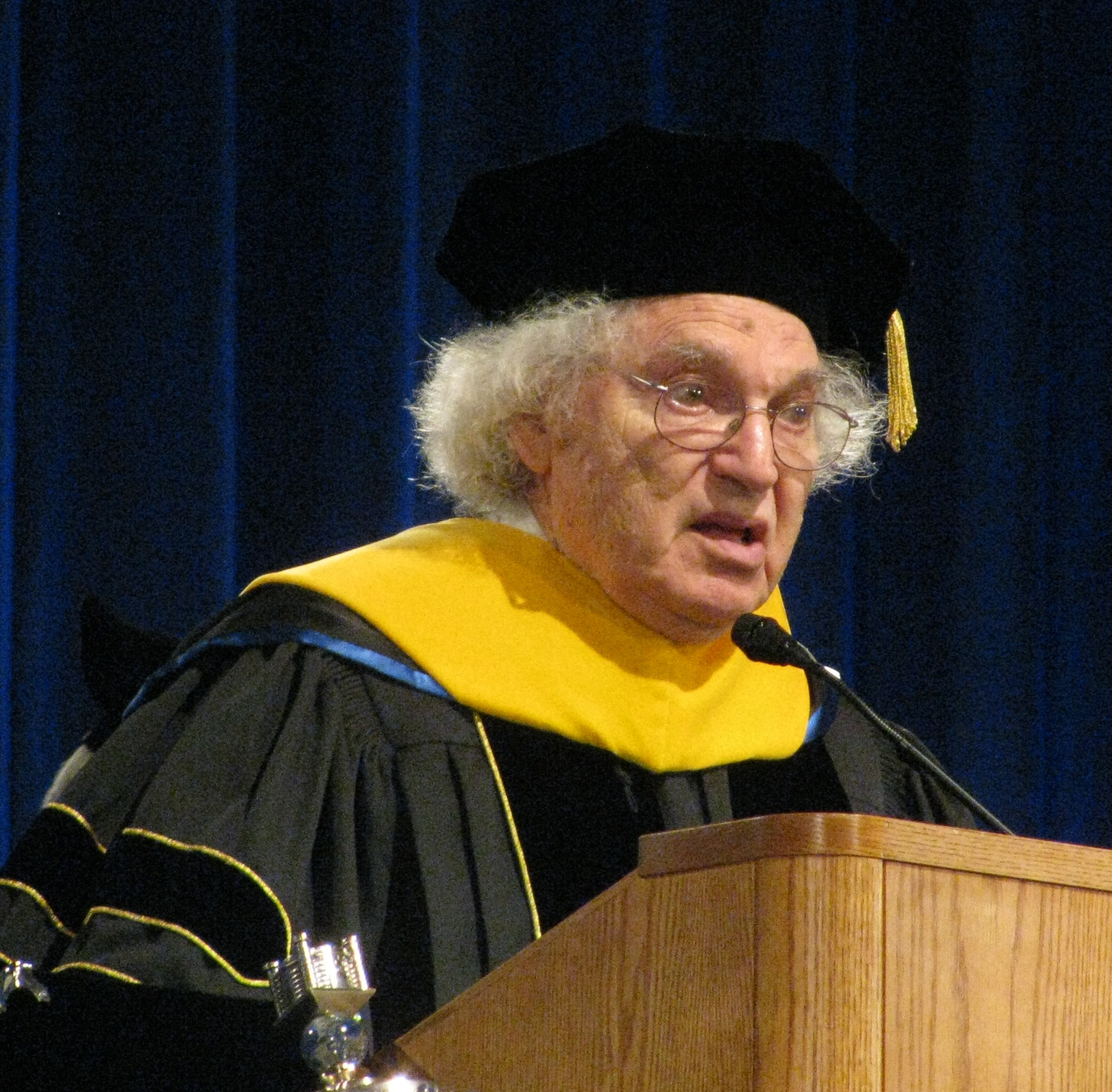
Herbert Hauptman, Ph.D.

- Gar Alperovitz (b. 1936), Ph.D. Lionel R. Bauman professor of political economy
- Alida Anderson, Ph.D. 2006, author and professor at American University.
- David Bader (b. 1969), Ph.D. 1996, professor of computing at Georgia Tech
- Charles L. Bennett (b. 1956), B.S. 1978, astrophysicist at Johns Hopkins University
- Joseph B. Bernstein (1995–2008), professor of electronic engineering at Ariel University, Known for his research on electronic device reliability
- Alok Bhargava (b. 1954), Ph.D. professor, University of Maryland School of Public Policy
- Mark A. Boyer (b. 1961), Ph.D. 1988, Board of Trustees Distinguished Professor of Political Science, University of Connecticut
- Orin M. Bullock Jr. (1905–1994), lecturer, architect, fellow of the American Institute of Architects
- Harry Clifton "Curley" Byrd (1889–1970), B.S. 1908, president of the University of Maryland, 1935–1954
- William J. Byron (b. 1927), Ph.D. 1969, president of The Catholic University of America
- Joan Callahan (1946–2019), Ph.D. 1982, professor emerita of philosophy at the University of Kentucky
- Kenneth C. Catania (b. 1965), B.S. 1989, neurobiologist at Vanderbilt University, MacArthur Fellowship awarded in 2006
- Matthew Chang, Ph.D. 2003, synthetic biologist at National University of Singapore
- Anthony F. DePalma (1904–2005), orthopedic surgeon and professor
- John Dryzek (b. 1953), Ph.D. 1980, professor of political theory and social theory at Australian National University
- Gerald Edward Galloway Jr.
- Donald West Harward, Ph.D., president of Bates College
- Dagmar R. Henney (b. 1931), 1931, one of the first female mathematicians known for her work as a professor of calculus, finite mathematics, and measure and integration
- Richard Herman, Ph.D. 1967, chancellor of the University of Illinois at Urbana–Champaign
- Charlene Drew Jarvis (b. 1941), Ph.D. 1971, president of Southeastern University (Washington, D.C.)
- Andrew Kliman (b. 1955), B.A. 1978, professor of economics at Pace University
- J.D. Kleinke (b. 1962), B.Sc. 1989, writer and entrepreneur in the field of health care
- Albin Owings Kuhn (1916–2010), B.S. 1938, M.S. 1939, Ph.D. 1948, executive vice president of the University of Maryland System (1979–1982), vice president of the University of Maryland, Baltimore (1965–1979) and the University of Maryland, Baltimore County (1965–1971)
- Simon Asher Levin (b. 1941), Ph.D. 1964, professor of ecology at Princeton University and winner of Kyoto Prize in Basic Sciences
- Jacqueline Liebergott, president of Emerson College
- Patrick Maggitti, first provost of Villanova University and former dean of the Villanova School of Business
- Manning Marable (1950–2011), Ph.D. 1976, professor of public affairs, political science, and history at Columbia University
- Tobin J. Marks (b. 1944), B.S. 1966, professor of material science and engineering at Northwestern University, awarded the 2002 American Institute of Chemists' gold medal
- Marc Melitz (b. 1968), M.S.B.A. 1992, professor of economics at Harvard University
- Katherine K. Preston (b. 1950), M.M. 1981, biographer, musicologist and former chair and professor emerita of the music school at the College of William & Mary
- Arnold L. Rheingold (b. 1940), professor of chemistry at the University of California, San Diego
- Michael Rustad, M.A., professor of law at Suffolk University Law School
- Shen Chun-shan (1932–2018), Ph.D. 1961, president of the Taiwanese National Tsing Hua University (1993–1997)
- Portia Holmes Shields, Ph.D. 1974, president of Albany State University (1996–2005), interim president of Tennessee State University (2011–2012)
- Adele H. Stamp (1893–1974), M.A. 1924, dean of women at the University of Maryland, namesake of the Adele H. Stamp Student Union
- Thomas B. Symons (1880–1970), president of the University of Maryland (1954)
- Lida Lee Tall (1873–1942), principal and president of State Teachers College at Towson (now Towson University)
- Barbara A. Williams, associate professor of astronomy at the University of Delaware (1986), first African American woman to earn a PhD in astronomy.
- Robin West (b. 1954), B.A., professor of law at Georgetown University Law Center
- Qiang Yang (b. 1963), Ph.D. 1989, professor of Hong Kong University of Science and Technology

=== Nobel laureates ===
- Raymond Davis, Jr. (1914–2006), B.S. 1937, M.S. 1940, physicist and recipient of the 2002 Nobel Prize in Physics; lead scientist behind the Homestake experiment
- Herbert Hauptman (1917–2011), Ph.D. 1955, mathematician and recipient of the 1985 Nobel Prize in Chemistry; only non-chemist to receive the award
- Thomas Schelling (1921–2016), economist, professor of foreign policy, national security, nuclear strategy, and arms control, and recipient of the 2005 Nobel Prize in Economics

== Arts and entertainment ==
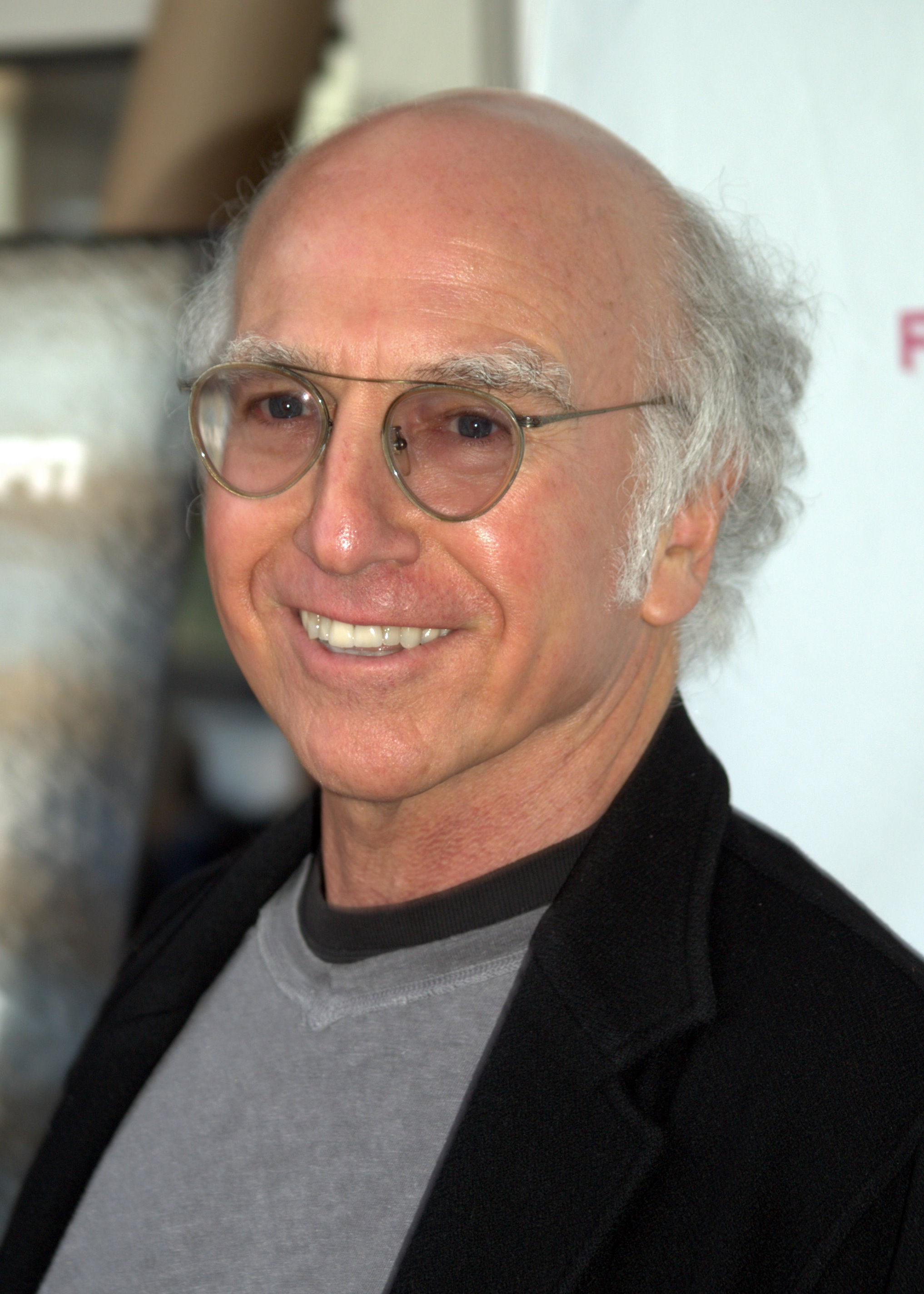
Larry David (B.A. 1970), co-creator and producer of Seinfeld and star of Curb Your Enthusiasm

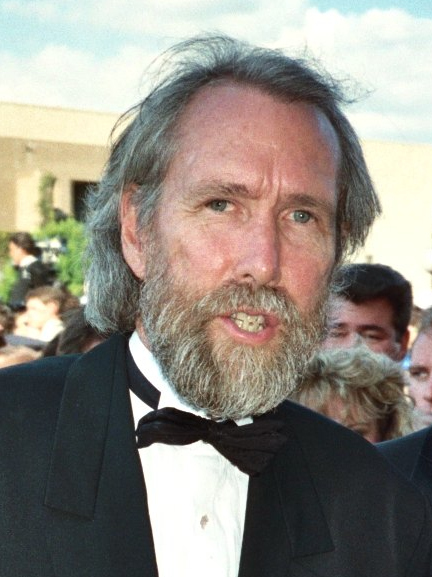
Jim Henson (B.S. 1960), creator of the Muppets

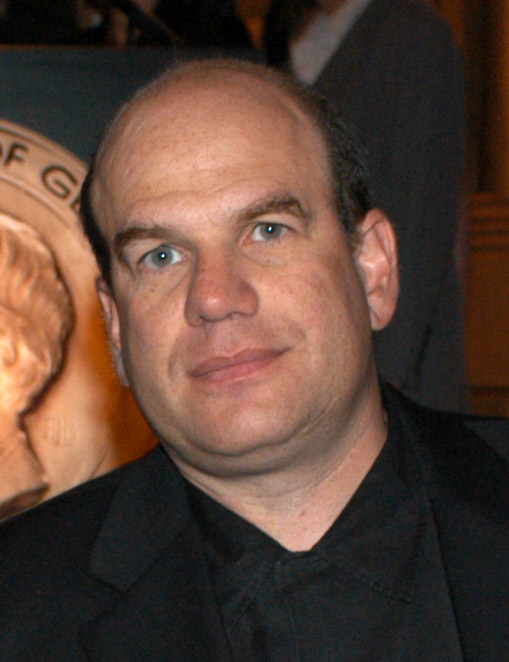
David Simon (B.A. 1983), creator of The Wire and Homicide: Life on the Street and a MacArthur Fellow

- Shabbir Ahluwalia (b. 1979), Indian television actor
- Mitch Allan, B.A., singer, songwriter, producer
- Karen Allen (b. 1951), actress in (Animal House, The Blues Brothers, Raiders of the Lost Ark)
- Mike Auldridge (1938–2012), 1967, Grammy Award-winning musician
- Carmen Balthrop (1948-2021), B.M. 1971, opera singer, professor
- Robbie Basho (1940–1986), singer, songwriter
- Art Bell (1945–2018), broadcaster, author
- Lewis Black (b. 1948), comedian (attended; transferred to UNC Chapel Hill)
- Janet Blair, M.A., singer, songwriter, classical oboist
- Frank Cho (b. 1971), drew comic strip for The Diamondback and creator of the comic strip and comic book Liberty Meadows
- Mark Ciardi (b. 1961), film producer (Miracle, The Rookie)
- Larry David (b. 1947), B.A. 1970, actor, writer and producer (Curb Your Enthusiasm, Seinfeld)
- Cedric Dent, Ph.D. 1997, singer, composer, and arranger for influential a cappella group Take 6; professor of Music at Middle Tennessee State University
- Stefania Dovhan, soprano
- Doris Downes (b. 1961), artist
- Michael Ealy (b. 1973), B.A., actor (Barbershop series)
- Sean Garrett, A.A., musician (attended the school's German program while father was on deployment in Germany)
- Jane Henson (1934-2013), puppeteer and co-founder of Muppets, Inc.
- Jim Henson (1936–1990), B.S. 1960, creator of the Muppets
- Carlisle H. Humelsine (1915–1989), B.A. 1937, founder of Colonial Williamsburg
- Wayson R. Jones, artist
- Jeff Kinney (b. 1971), author of Diary of a Wimpy Kid series
- Jason Kravits (b. 1967), actor (The Practice)
- Jeff Krulik, film director (Heavy Metal Parking Lot)
- Mark Lasoff, M.S. 1988, Academy Award winner for visual effects for Titanic
- Brian MacDevitt, 5-time Tony Award winner for Best Lighting Design, Associate Professor of lighting design at the University of Maryland, College Park
- Beth McCarthy-Miller (b. 1963), B.A., Saturday Night Live director, 1995–2006; 30 Rock director
- Aaron McGruder (b. 1974), creator of The Boondocks series
- Virginia Mecklenburg (b. 1948), Ph.D. 1983, curator at the Smithsonian American Art Museum
- Peter Mehlman (b. 1956), 1977, writer and co-executive producer (Seinfeld)
- David Mills (1961–2010), screenwriter, author, and journalist; writer for the Emmy-winning HBO miniseries The Corner and Treme
- Adam Neely (b. 1988), jazz musician, bassist, and YouTuber
- Michael Olmert (b. 1940), B.A. 1962, Ph.D. 1980, writer and three-time Emmy Award winner for his work on the Discovery Channel, professor of English at the University of Maryland
- Jeremy Penn (b. 1979), painter
- Ryan Pickett, award-winning film director
- Robin Quivers (b. 1952), radio personality and co-host of The Howard Stern Show
- Giuliana Rancic (b. 1974), television personality, anchor of E! News
- Allyn Rose (b. 1988), Miss Sinergy 2010, Miss Maryland USA 2011 and Miss USA 2011 (Top 8)
- Peter Rosenberg (b. 1979), DJ, radio personality and co-host of Hot 97's Ebro in the Morning
- Bitty Schram (b. 1968), actress (Monk)
- Mark Schwahn (b. 1966), creator of One Tree Hill
- David Silverman (b. 1957) (attended, 1975–1977), animator, director, producer on The Simpsons, director of The Simpsons Movie, and co-director of Monsters, Inc.
- David Simon (b. 1960), creator, producer, and co-writer of The Wire and creator of Homicide: Life on the Street
- Erin Smith (b. 1972), guitarist of Bratmobile; activist
- Tiffany Taylor, Playboy Playmate (November 1998)
- Ken Waissman, Tony Award-winning Broadway producer
- Douglass Wallop (1920–1985), playwright, Damn Yankees
- Carol Stuart Watson (1931–1986), illustrator and publisher
- Dianne Wiest (b. 1948), actress, two-time Academy Award winner
- Tracy Young, deejay and remixer

== Business ==
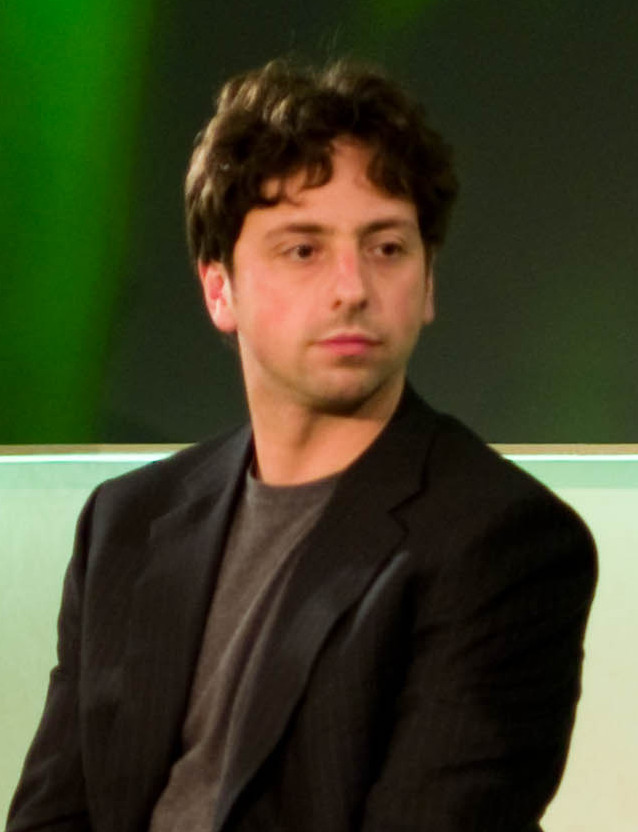
Sergey Brin (B.S. 1993), co-founder of Google

- William F. Andrews (c. 1933), former chairman of the Singer Corporation and the Corrections Corporation of America
- Gail Berman (b. 1956), B.A. 1978, former president of Paramount Pictures
- Tom Bernard, co-president of Sony Pictures Classics
- Eric F. Billings (b. 1954), chairman and CEO of both Friedman Billings Ramsey and FBR Capital Markets Corporation
- Keith Brendley (b. 1958), B.S., 1980, leading authority on active protection systems and president of Artis, a research and development company
- Sergey Brin (b. 1973), B.S. 1993, co-founder of Google
- Robert D. Briskman (b. 1932), co-founder of Sirius Satellite Radio
- A. James Clark (1927–2015), B.S. 1950, president of Clark Construction, namesake of the A. James Clark School of Engineering
- Michael D. Dingman (1931–2017), B.A. 1955, international investor
- Raul Fernandez (c. 1966), chairman and CEO of Proxicom, co-owner of the NHL Washington Capitals, NBA Washington Wizards, director of Liz Claiborne
- Carly Fiorina (b. 1954), M.B.A. 1980, former chair and CEO of Hewlett-Packard, 2010 Republican nominee for California United States Senate seat

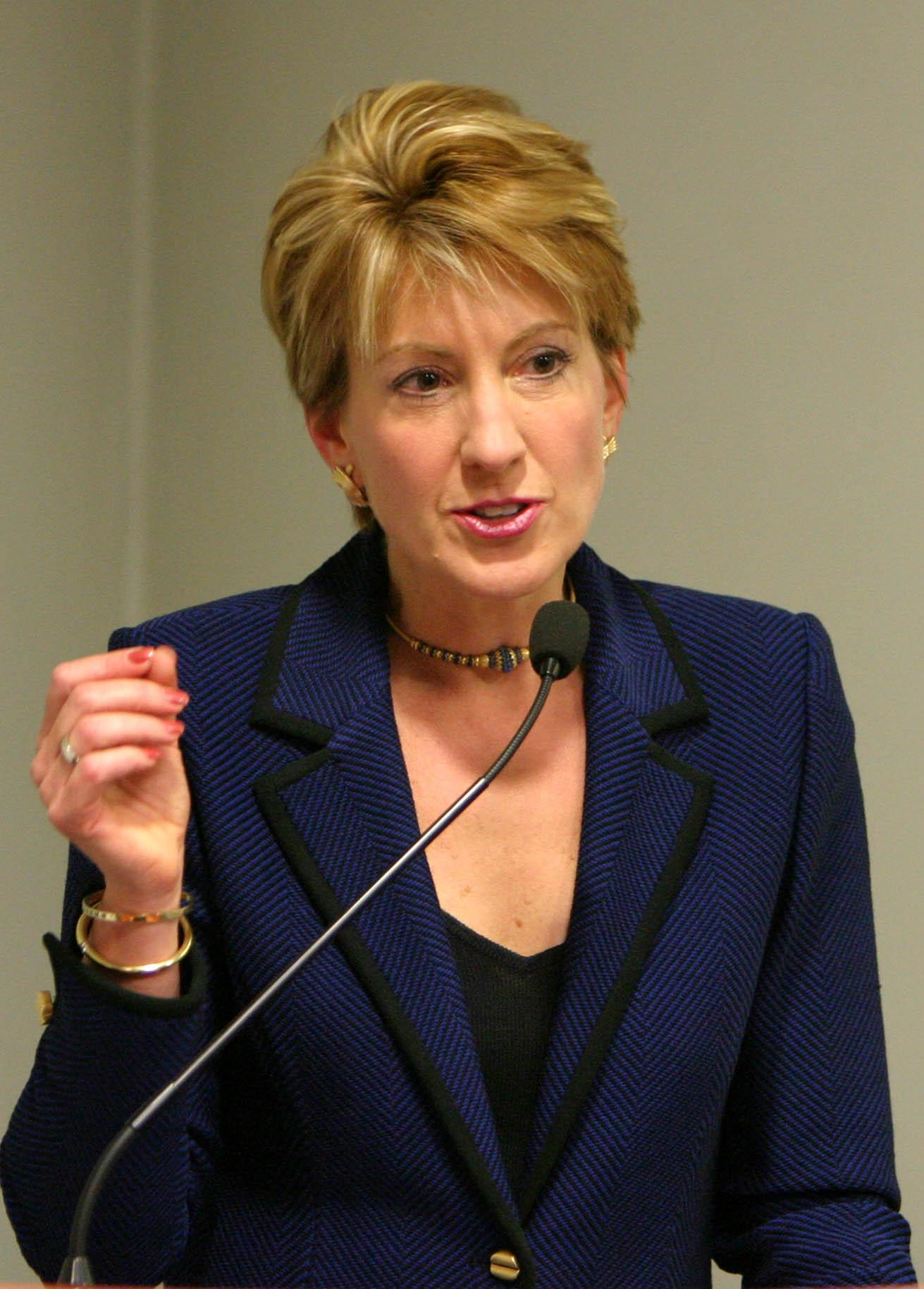
Carly Fiorina (MBA 1980), former CEO of Hewlett-Packard

- Kathryn S. Fuller, chairman of the board of Ford Foundation; former president and CEO of non-governmental organization World Wildlife Fund
- Brendan Iribe, co-founder and original CEO of Oculus VR, inc
- Hugh Newell Jacobsen (1929–2021), B.A. 1951, world-renowned architect and Fellow of the American Institute of Architects
- Jeong H. Kim (b. 1960), Ph.D. 1991, president of Bell Labs
- Kenny Kramm (1961–2016), founder and creator of FLAVORx
- Chris Kubasik, former president and COO of Lockheed Martin
- Samuel J. LeFrak (1918–2003), B.S. 1940, chaired the LeFrak Organization, one of the largest private building firms in the world
- William E. Mayer, owner of the Hartford Colonials, former CEO of Credit Suisse
- Creig Northrop (B.A. 1989), real estate agent and broker, president and CEO of Northrop Realty
- Lou Pai (b. 1947), former CEO of Enron Energy Services
- Kevin Plank (b. 1972), B.A. 1996, founder of Under Armour athletic apparel company
- J. Christopher Reyes (b. 1953), co-founder and chairman of Reyes Holdings
- Robert H. Smith (1928–2009), B.S. 1950, real estate developer, namesake of the Robert H. Smith School of Business
- Ed Snider (1933–2016), owner of the Philadelphia Flyers and the Philadelphia 76ers
- Daniel Snyder (b. 1964) (attended), owner of the Washington Redskins, former chairman of the board of Six Flags
- Dennis R. Wraase, CEO of Pepco Holdings

== Government and public policy ==
=== Presidents ===
- Ma Ying-jeou (b. 1950), president of the Republic of China (2008–2016)
- Galo Plaza (1906–1987), B.S. 1926, president of Ecuador (1948–1952), secretary general of the Organization of American States (1968–1975)

=== Governors ===
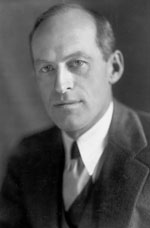
Millard Tydings (B.S. 1910), long-serving U.S. senator and namesake of the Tydings Committee

- Harry R. Hughes (1926–2019), B.S. 1949, governor of Maryland (1979–1987)
- Marvin Mandel (1920–2015), B.A. 1939, governor of Maryland (1969–1979)
- Mike Parson (b. 1955), governor of Missouri (2018–present)

=== Senators ===
- Gordon Humphrey (b. 1940), 1962, U.S. senator from New Hampshire
- Joseph Tydings (1928–2018), B.S. 1950, U.S. senator from Maryland
- Millard Tydings (1890–1961), B.S. 1910, U.S. senator from Maryland who introduced legislation in 1920 to create the University of Maryland

=== Congressmen ===
- Harry Streett Baldwin (1894–1952), U.S. congressman, 1943–47
- Cheri Bustos (b. 1961), U.S. congresswoman from Illinois
- Dennis Cardoza (b. 1959), U.S. congressman from California
- William Lacy Clay, Jr. (b. 1956), B.A. 1974, U.S. congressman from Missouri
- William Purington Cole, Jr. (1889–1957), B.S. 1910, U.S. congressman from Maryland, namesake of Cole Field House
- Roy Dyson (b. 1948), Maryland state senator, former U.S. congressman
- Stephen Warfield Gambrill (1873–1938), U.S. congressman, 1924–38
- William F. Goodling (1927–2017), B.S. 1953, U.S. congressman from Pennsylvania
- Steny Hoyer (b. 1939), B.S. 1963, U.S. congressman from Maryland and House majority leader of the 110th United States Congress, chief sponsor of the Americans with Disabilities Act
- Thomas Francis Johnson (1909–1988), U.S. congressman from Maryland's 1st district, 1959–63

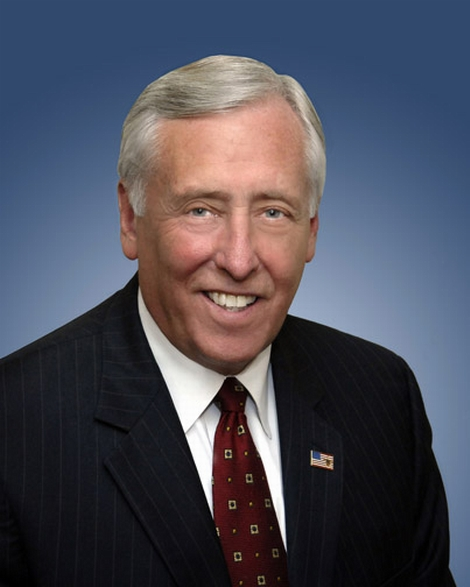
Steny Hoyer (B.S. 1963, D.P.S. (Hon.) 1988), former United States House majority leader and former minority whip

- Tom Kindness (1929–2004), B.A. 1951, U.S. congressman from Ohio
- Ernest Konnyu (b. 1937) (attended), U.S. congressman from California
- Tom McMillen (b. 1952), B.S. 1974, former U.S. congressman from Maryland and Rhodes Scholar
- Parren Mitchell (1922–2007), M.A. 1952, former U.S. congressman from Maryland, Maryland's first black congressman
- Dutch Ruppersberger (b. 1946), B.S. 1967, former U.S. congressman from Maryland
- Eric Swalwell (b. 1980), B.A. 2003, former U.S. congressman from California
- Esteban Torres (1930–2022), 1965, U.S. congressman from California
- Jennifer Wexton (b. 1968), U.S. congresswoman from Virginia

=== State legislators ===
- Saqib Ali (b. 1975), Maryland state delegate
- David R. Brinkley (b. 1959), B.A. 1981, Maryland state senator
- James Brochin (b. 1964), Maryland state senator
- John W. Derr (1941–2026), Maryland state senator
- Andy Dinniman (b. 1944), M.A. 1969, Pennsylvania state senator
- Charles W. Famous (1875–1938), 1901, Maryland delegate
- Patrick N. Hogan (b. 1979), 2002, Maryland state delegate
- Thomas E. Hutchins, Maryland state delegate and Maryland State Police superintendent
- Verna L. Jones (b. 1955), B.A. 1978, Maryland state senator
- Delores G. Kelley (b. 1936)
- James M. Kelly (b. 1960), 1988, special assistant to President Bush, Maryland state delegate
- Robert P. Kingsbury, B.S. 1950, New Hampshire House of Representatives
- Rona E. Kramer (b. 1954)
- Eric Luedtke (b. 1981), B.A. 2002, M.Ed. 2004, Maryland state delegate and House of Delegates Majority Leader
- William Daniel Mayer (b. 1941), Maryland state delegate
- Tony McConkey (b. 1963), Maryland state delegate
- Thomas V. Miller, Jr. (1942–2021), B.S. 1964, president of the Maryland Senate
- Paul V. Nolan (1923–2009), Tennessee General Assembly, 1969–1970
- Douglas J.J. Peters (b. 1963)
- Eileen M. Rehrmann (b. 1944), B.S. 1997, Maryland state delegate, Harford County Executive
- Justin Ross (b. 1976), Maryland state delegate
- James E. Rzepkowski (b. 1971), 1993, Maryland state delegate
- John F. Slade III (b. 1943), 1967, Maryland state delegate
- Charles H. Smelser (1920–2009), 1942, Maryland state senator
- Paul S. Stull (b. 1936), Maryland state delegate
- Joshua Stonko (b. 1993), 2022, Maryland state delegate
- Ronald Young (b. 1940), Maryland state senator

=== Military personnel ===
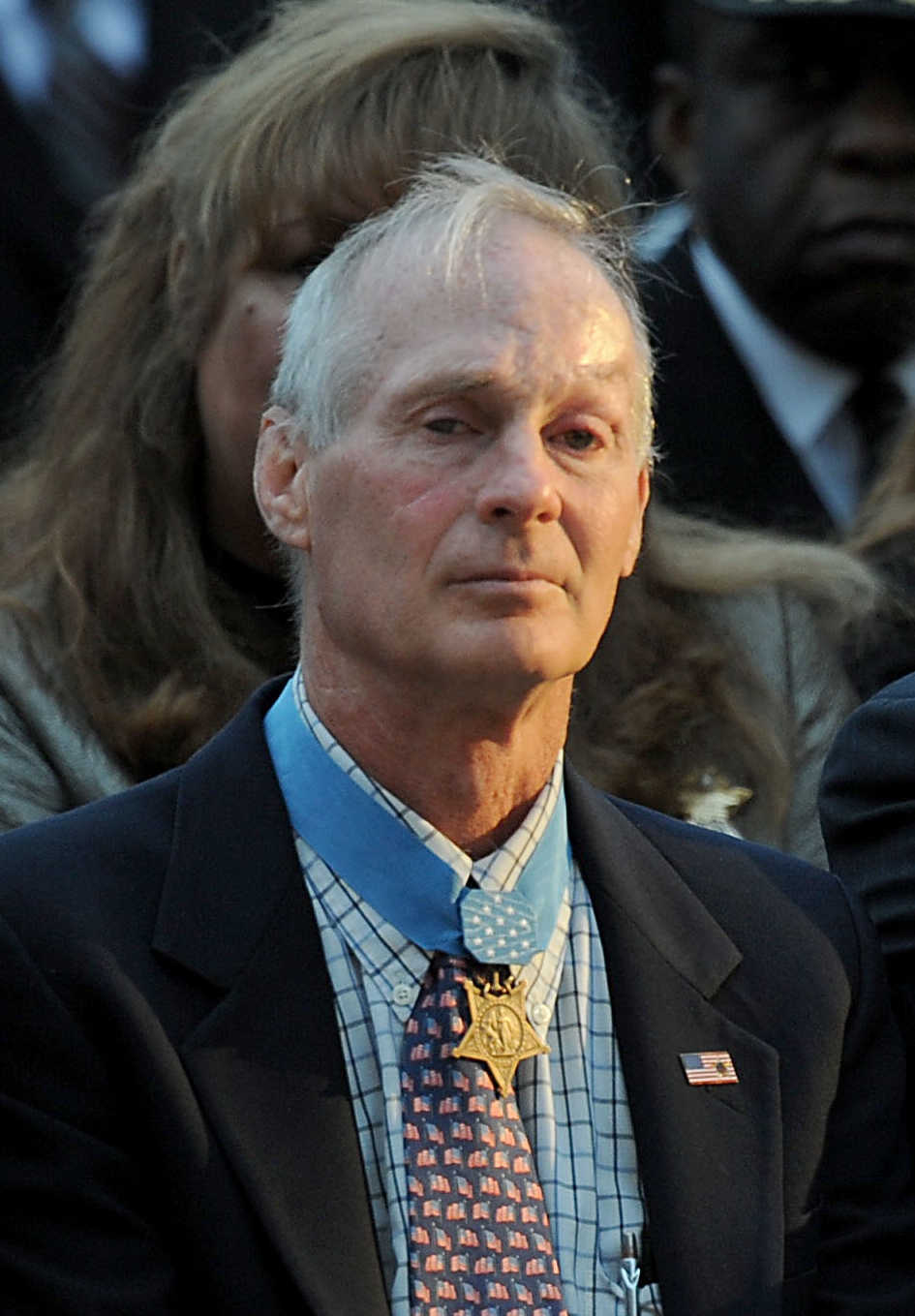
Thomas R. Norris (B.S. 1967), Medal of Honor recipient

- Julius W. Becton, Jr. (1926–2023), Federal Emergency Management Agency director, retired U.S. Army lieutenant general
- Joseph C. Burger (1902–1982), B.S. 1925, U.S. Marine Corps general
- Reginald M. Cram (1914–2004), M.S., 1963, United States Air Force major general, adjutant general of the Vermont National Guard
- Dominic Salvatore Gentile (1920–1951), 1951, U.S. Air Force major and legendary fighter pilot
- Florent A. Groberg (b. 1983), B.S. 2006, retired U.S. Army captain and recipient of the Medal of Honor
- Gregory C. Huffman (b. 1967), M.A. 1989, United States Navy admiral
- John R. Lanigan (1902–1974), B.S. 1926, United States Marine Corps Brigadier general and recipient of the Navy Cross
- Robert B. Luckey (1905–1974), B.S. 1927, U.S. Marine Corps general
- Thomas R. Norris (b. 1944), B.S. 1967, retired U.S. Navy SEAL and recipient of the Medal of Honor
- Stephen G. Olmstead (1929–2022), B.S. 1961, U.S. Marine Corps general
- Leonard T. Schroeder Jr. (1918–2009), retired U.S. Army colonel, first soldier ashore on D-Day in World War II
- Linda Spoonster Schwartz (b. 1944), United States Air Force Captain, former Assistant Secretary for Policy and Planning at the Department of Veterans Affairs
- George B. Simler (1921–1972), U.S. Air Force general
- Kevin R. Slates (b. 1959), retired United States Navy admiral
- Robert Nicholas Young (1900–1964), B.S. 1922, United States Army general

=== International figures ===
- Kwesi Ahwoi (b. 1946), Minister for Food and Agriculture of Ghana
- Yahya Al-Mutawakel (b. 1959), Yemeni Trade Minister
- Anies Baswedan (b. 1969), governor of Jakarta
- Nguyen Si Binh, chairman of the anti-communist People's Action Party of Vietnam
- Galo Plaza (1906–1987), president of Ecuador, secretary general of the Organization of American States
- Shirley Thomson (1930–2010), director of the Canada Council

=== Diplomats ===
- Prudence Bushnell (b. 1946), U.S. diplomat and former U.S. ambassador to Guatemala and Kenya
- Joseph B. Gildenhorn (b. 1929), former U.S. ambassador to Switzerland (1989–1993)
- L. Craig Johnstone (b. 1942), former U.S. ambassador to Algeria and current UN deputy High Commissioner for Refugees
- Edward J. Perkins (1928–2020), former U.S. ambassador to the United Nations, Liberia, and South Africa
- Robin Raphel (b. 1947), U.S. ambassador to Tunisia
- David M. Satterfield (b. 1954), U.S. diplomat in the Middle East; senior advisor on Iraq for the secretary of state

=== Jurists ===
- Mary Stallings Coleman (1914–2001), B.A. 1935, chief justice of the Supreme Court of Michigan, first female justice of the court
- Joyce Hens Green (b. 1928), senior United States District Court judge for the District of Columbia
- W. Louis Hennessy (b. 1955), associate judge, 4th District of Maryland; former member of Maryland House of Delegates
- Sybil Moses (1939–2009), prosecutor of the "Dr. X" Mario Jascalevich murder case and New Jersey Superior Court judge
- Eugene O'Dunne (1875–1959), pioneering anti-racist judge on the Supreme Bench of Baltimore

=== U.S. Government officials ===
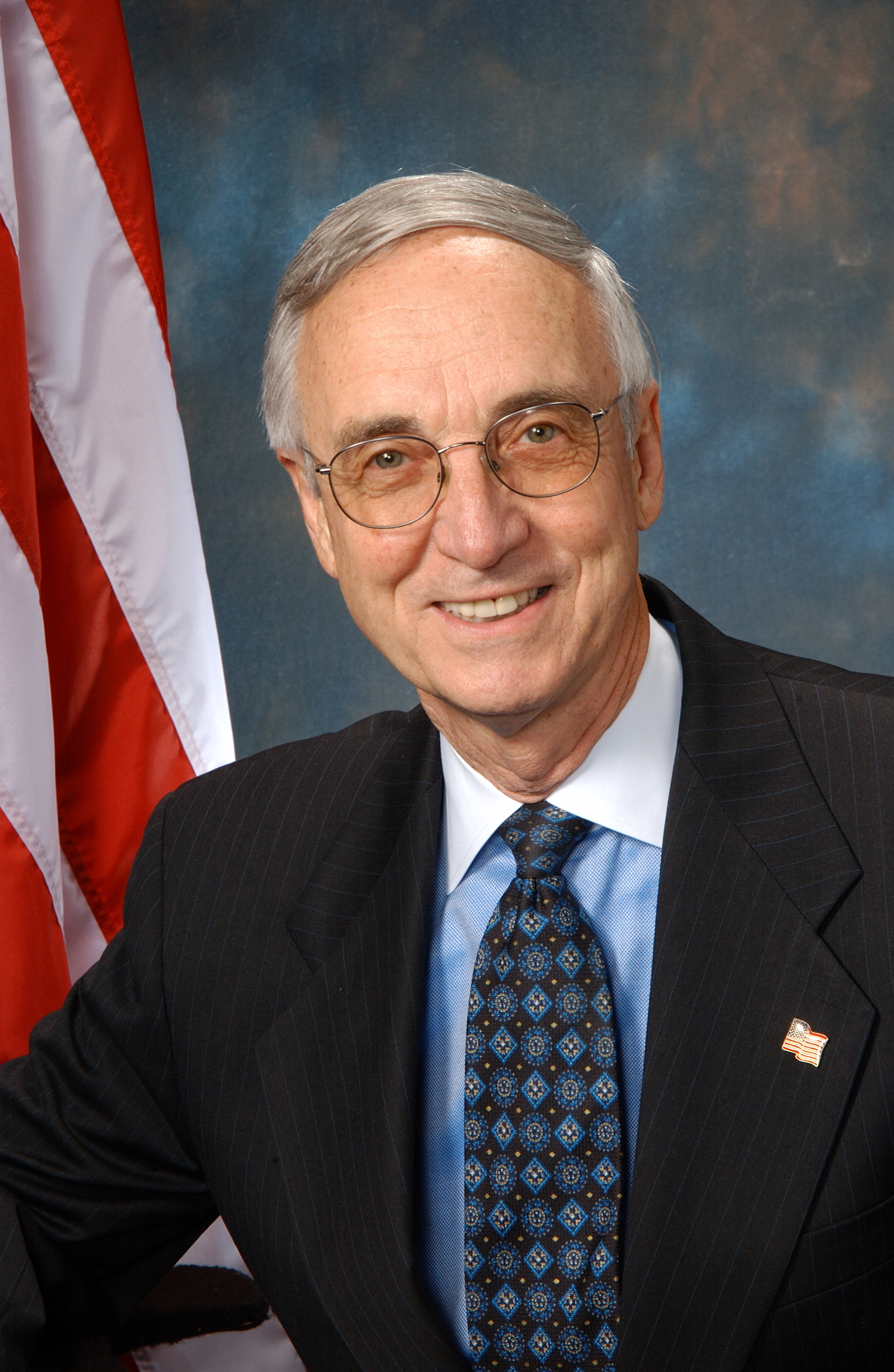
Gordon R. England (B.S. 1961), former United States Deputy Secretary of Defense

- Stephen T. Ayers (b. 1962), B.S., former Architect of the Capitol
- Richard A. Baker (b. 1940), Ph.D. 1982, first Historian of the United States Senate
- John Berry (b. 1959), B.A. 1980, former U.S. ambassador to Australia, former director of the U.S. Office of Personnel Management, and former director of the National Zoo
- Robert C. Bonner (b. 1942), B.A. 1963, former commissioner of the U.S. Customs Service and former administrator of the Drug Enforcement Administration
- James Clapper (b. 1941), B.S. 1963, former director of National Intelligence
- Gordon R. England (b. 1937), B.S. 1961, United States Deputy Secretary of Defense, former Secretary of Navy and deputy secretary of the U.S. Department of Homeland Security
- Kathleen Hicks (b. 1970), M.P.A. 1993, 35th United States Deputy Secretary of Defense
- Vivek Kundra (b. 1974), B.S. 1998, first Chief Information Officer of the United States
- Sean McCormack (b. 1964), M.A. 1990, former U.S. Assistant Secretary of State for Public Affairs
- Tricia McLaughlin, political spokesperson
- Donald A. Ritchie (b. 1945), M.A. 1969, Ph.D. 1975, current Historian Emeritus of the United States Senate
- Mark Rosenker (1946–2020), B.A. 1969, former chairman of the National Transportation Safety Board
- Kori Schake (b. 1962), White House advisor, currently a fellow at the Hoover Institute
- Charles L. Schultze (1924–2016), chairman, Council of Economic Advisers in the Carter administration
- Faryar Shirzad (b. 1965), advisor to U.S. President George W. Bush
- William W. Skinner (1874–1953), B.S. 1895, chemist, United States Department of Agriculture, one of the first to study the impact of chemical pollution on the Potomac River and Chesapeake Bay
- Jeff Trandahl (b. 1964), executive director of the National Fish & Wildlife Foundation, former clerk of the U.S. House of Representatives
- Reginald V. Truitt (1890–1991), B.S. 1914, M.S. 1921, zoologist, founded the Chesapeake Biological Laboratory at the University of Maryland Center for Environmental Science
- John W. Vessey (1922–2016), chairman of the Joint Chiefs of Staff
- Susie Wiles (b. 1957), B.A., campaign manager, White House Chief of Staff under President Donald Trump

=== Others ===
- Lester R. Brown (b. 1934), M.S. 1959, founder and president of the Earth Policy Institute
- Zainab Chaudry, civil rights and political activist
- Josh Cohen (b. 1973), B.A. 1995, former mayor of Annapolis, Maryland (2009–2013)
- Karen Davis (b. 1944), Ph.D., founder and president of United Poultry Concerns
- Karen L. Haas (b. 1962), 33rd clerk of the United States House of Representatives
- Butch Kinerney (1990 news-editorial journalism), expert in risk and crisis communications
- Elaine Marshall (b. 1945), North Carolina secretary of state
- Mike Parson (b. 1955), governor of Missouri
- Bernice Sandler (1928–2019), Ed.D. 1969, women's rights activist whose work led to the enactment of Title IX
- Carsten Sieling (b. 1959), German politician (German Federal Diet – Deutscher Bundestag)
- Susan Turnbull (b. 1952), vice chair of Democratic National Committee, nominated to lead Maryland Democratic Party
- Mark K. Updegrove (b. 1961), B.A. 1984, director of the LBJ Presidential Library

== Journalism ==
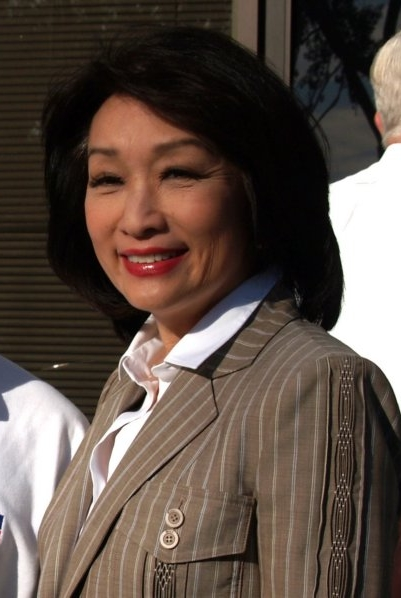
Connie Chung (B.A. 1969), broadcast journalist and news anchor

- Lee Abbamonte, travel blogger and the youngest American to visit all 193 United Nations member states
- Joy Bauer (b. 1963), dietitian on the Today Show, columnist for Self
- Art Bell (1945–2018), founder and host of the radio program, Coast to Coast AM
- Bonnie Bernstein (b. 1970), network TV sports reporter
- Carl Bernstein (b. 1944), Watergate journalist
- Jayson Blair (b. 1976), New York Times journalist
- Tim Brant (b. 1949), sportscaster for WJLA, Raycom Sports, ABC and CBS
- Steve Byrnes (1959–2015), former NASCAR broadcaster and pit road reporter with NASCAR on FOX and TBS Superstation; sideline reporter for Raycom Sports, play-by-play announcer for NFL on FOX; producer
- Tina Cervasio (b. 1974), television sportscaster for WNYW and Big Ten Network
- Norman Chad (b. 1958), sports writer, ESPN personality
- Kiran Chetry (b. 1974), former Fox News Channel personality and former CNN American Morning co-host
- Connie Chung (b. 1946), B.S. 1969, news anchor with CBS, NBC, and CNN
- Sarah Cohen, Pulitzer Prize winner, The Washington Post
- Heidi Collins (b. 1967), anchor for CNN
- Brian Crecente (b. 1970), videogame columnist for the Rocky Mountain News and editor of Gawker-owned videogame blog Kotaku
- Jeanne Cummings, government team deputy editor at Bloomberg News in Washington, D.C., formerly at Politico, and The Wall Street Journal
- Mark Davis (b. 1957), talk radio host at KSKY and columnist with The Dallas Morning News
- Giuliana DePandi (b. 1974), television host for E! News Live
- Ben Ephson (b. 1957), publisher and Managing Editor of the Daily Dispatch
- Ellen Louise Graham, journalist at Wall Street Journal and 1999 Pulitzer Prize finalist
- Rebecca Gomez (b. 1967), correspondent for Fox Business
- Michelle Johnson, journalist for The Boston Globe
- Jack Kelley, former reporter for USA Today
- Gayle King (b. 1954), editor-at-large for O: The Oprah Magazine, host for an XM Radio program
- Tim Kurkjian (b. 1956), analyst for ESPN
- Sharanjit Leyl (b. 1973), business anchor, BBC World News
- Robin Lundberg (b. 1981), sports broadcaster
- Cassie Mackin (1939–1982), national news correspondent, television news anchor, and Emmy Award winner
- Mark McEwen (b. 1954), TV personality for CBS Morning News and The Early Show
- Jamie McIntyre, former senior Pentagon correspondent for CNN
- Soraya Sarhaddi Nelson, bureau chief for NPR bureau in Afghanistan
- Robert M. Parker, Jr. (b. 1947), B.A. 1970, wine critic
- Jimmy Roberts (b. 1957), reporter for NBC
- Rowan Scarborough, writer and former The Washington Times columnist
- Patrick Stevens (b. 1968), former sportswriter for The Washington Times
- Bert Sugar (1936–2012), boxing writer and historian
- Scott Van Pelt (b. 1966), anchor for SportsCenter on ESPN
- Jim Walton, president and CEO of CNN
- Pam Ward, anchor for ESPN and ESPN2
- David Zurawik (b. 1949), Ph.D. 2000, TV and media critic for The Baltimore Sun; assistant professor at Goucher College

=== Pulitzer Prize ===
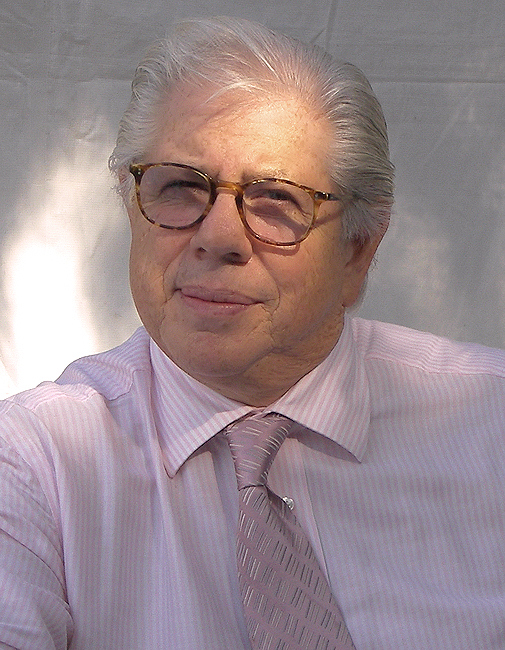
Carl Bernstein (attended), journalist who uncovered the Watergate scandal with Bob Woodward

- Carl Bernstein (b. 1944), broke the Watergate scandal with Bob Woodward; their work helped earn The Washington Post a Pulitzer Prize for Public Service in 1973
- David S. Broder (1929–2011), professor at the Philip Merrill College of Journalism and weekly columnist for The Washington Post; Pulitzer Prize for Distinguished Commentary
- James MacGregor Burns (1918–2014), presidential biographer, scholar at the James MacGregor Burns Academy of Leadership at the University of Maryland; won Pulitzer Prize and National Book Award for 1971 biographer of President Franklin D. Roosevelt
- Sarah Cohen, shared the Pulitzer Prize for Investigative Reporting in 2002; professor at Duke University
- Mary Lou Forbes (1926–2009) (attended), Pulitzer Prize–winning journalist at the Washington Evening Star and The Washington Times
- Jon D. Franklin (b. 1943), B.S. 1970, journalist for the Baltimore Evening Sun, 1979 Pulitzer Prize for Feature Writing, 1985 Pulitzer Prize for Exploratory Journalism
- Louis Harlan (1922–2010), professor emeritus of history at the University of Maryland, Pulitzer Prize in Biography
- Jane Healy, editor of the Orlando Sentinel, chair of the board of visitors at the Philip Merrill College of Journalism
- Haynes Johnson (1931–2013), awarded Pulitzer Prize in 1966 for distinguished national reporting on the civil rights crisis in Alabama; professor and knight chair at the Philip Merrill College of Journalism
- Sarah Kaufman (b. 1963), 2010 Pulitzer Prize for Criticism for The Washington Post
- Manning Marable (1950–2011), 2012 Pulitzer Prize for History, Malcolm X: A Life of Reinvention
- Deborah Nelson, won Pulitzer Prize for investigative reporting in 1997; director of Carnegie Seminar at the University of Maryland
- Eric Newhouse, M.A. 1970, 2000 winner of the Pulitzer Prize in Exploratory Journalism
- Leonard Pitts (b. 1957), nationally syndicated columnist and winner of the 2004 Pulitzer Prize for Commentary; visiting professor at Maryland
- Gene Roberts (b. 1932), 2007 winner for History; former managing editor for The New York Times and current professor at the Philip Merrill College of Journalism

== Literature ==
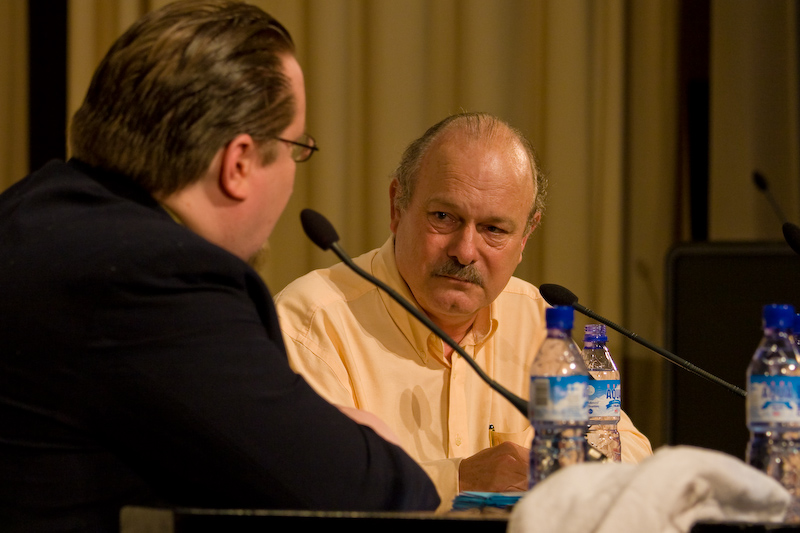
Joe Haldeman (B.S. 1967), author of The Forever War

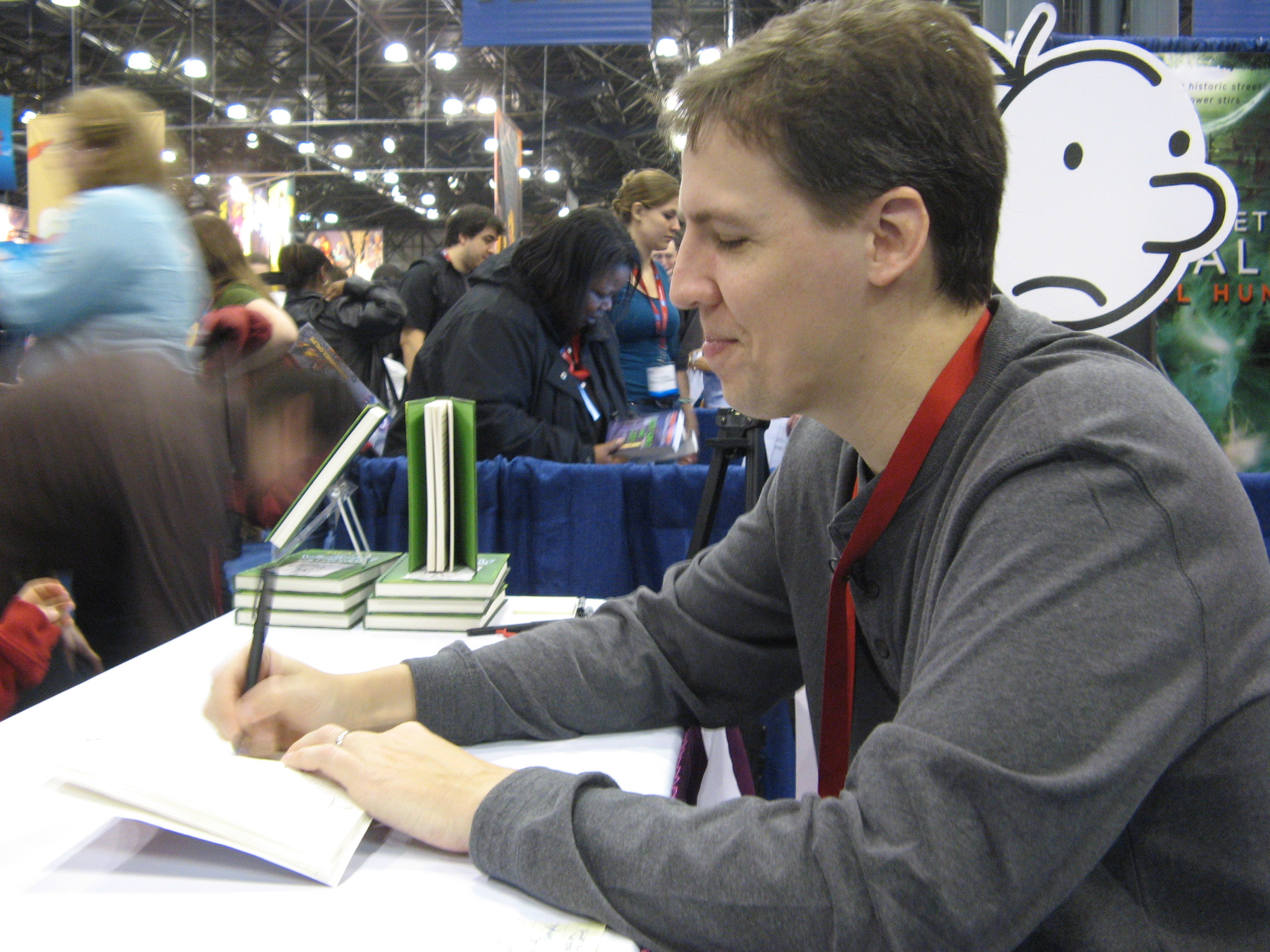
Jeff Kinney (B.A. 1993), author of the Diary of a Wimpy Kid series

- Kofi Aidoo, Ghanaian author
- Rosario Ferré (1938–2016), poet
- John Glad (1941–2015), Russian literature expert and eugenicist
- Martha Grimes (b. 1931), author of detective fiction
- Joe Haldeman (b. 1943), science fiction writer, best known for The Forever War
- Malcolm Harris (b. 1988), non-fiction writer
- Karen Hesse (b. 1952), author of children's literature, MacArthur Fellow
- N. K. Jemisin (b. 1972), award-winning science fiction writer
- Bettina Judd, author and poet
- Jeff Kinney (b. 1971), The New York Times bestselling author of the Diary of a Wimpy Kid series
- Jeffrey Kluger (b. 1954), writer, best known for co-writing Lost Moon: The Perilous Voyage of Apollo 13 with Jim Lovell, basis of the movie Apollo 13
- Gina Kolata (b. 1948), award-winning author and science journalist for The New York Times
- Munro Leaf (1905–1976), B.A. 1927, author
- George Pelecanos (b. 1957), mystery writer
- Matt Beynon Rees, award-winning crime novelist, former journalist for Time
- Michael J. Varhola (b. 1966), author of several history books and founder of Skirmisher Publishing

== Science and technology ==
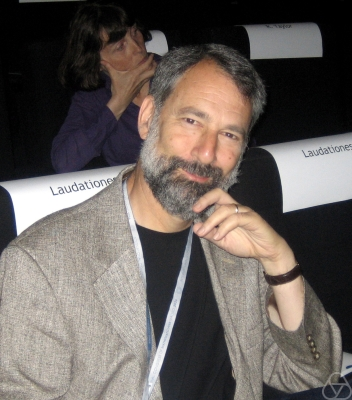
Charles Fefferman

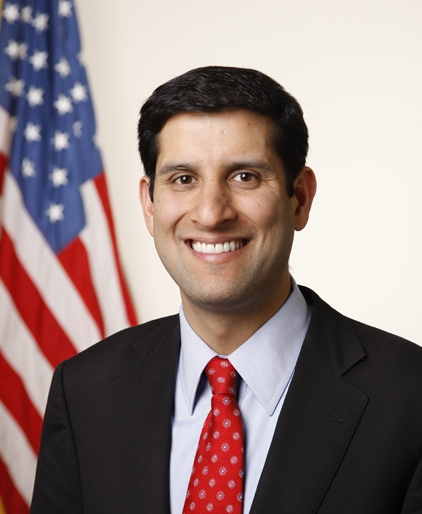
Vivek Kundra (B.S. 1996), first and current Chief Information Officer of the United States

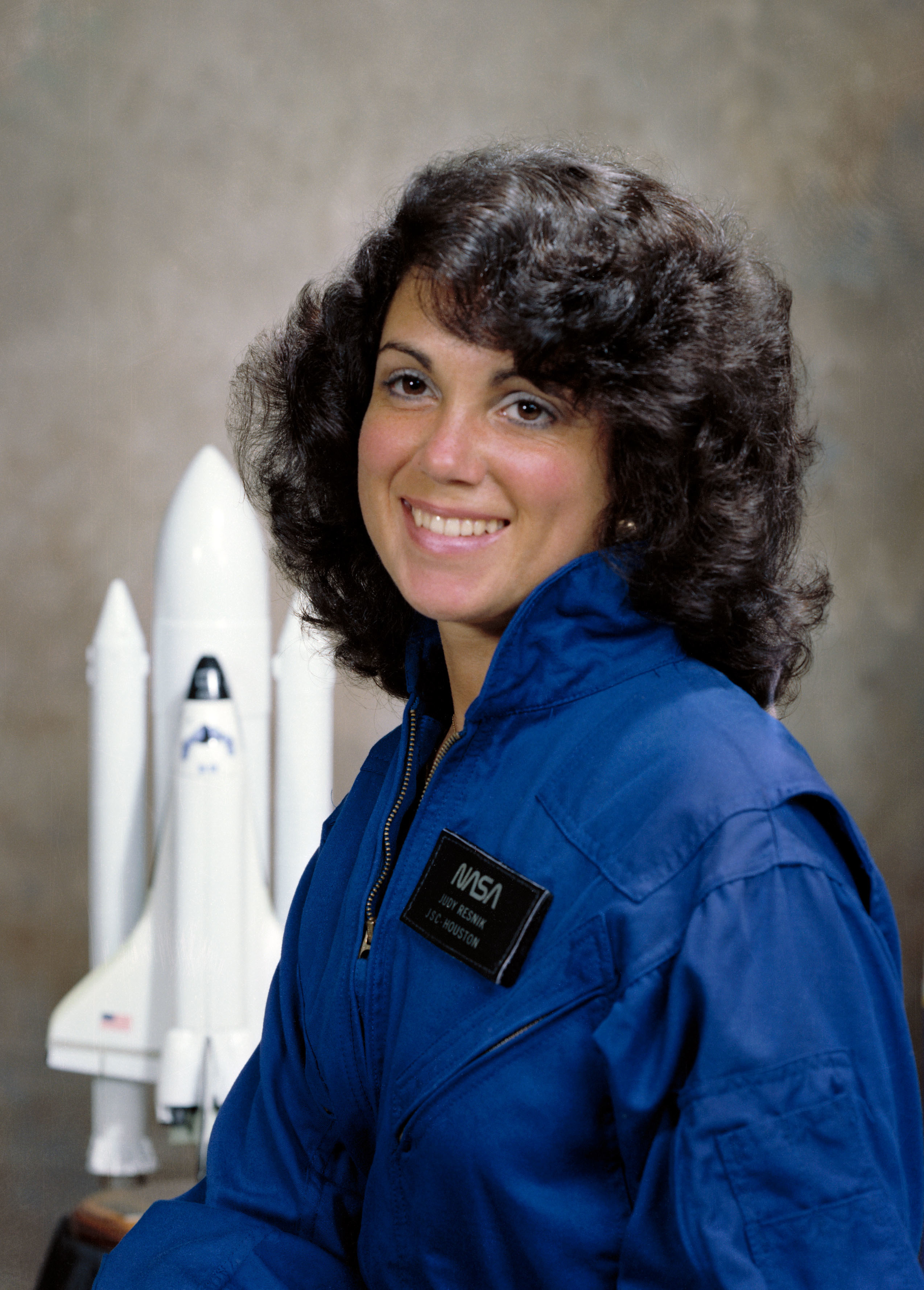
Judith Resnik

- Richard R. Arnold (b. 1963), NASA astronaut, Space Shuttle Discovery
- Stephen T. Ayers (b. 1962), United States architect of the Capitol
- Frederick S. Billig (1933–2006), M.S. 1958, Ph.D. 1964, pioneer of the scramjet at the Johns Hopkins University Applied Physics Laboratory
- Sergey Brin (b. 1973), co-founder and technology president of Google
- Robert D. Briskman (b. 1932), M.S.E.E., 1961, co-founder of Sirius Satellite Radio
- Jeffrey Bub (b. 1942), physicist, researcher on quantum foundations, and winner of the 1998 Lakatos Award
- George Dantzig (1914–2005), B.A. 1936, mathematician
- Raymond Davis Jr. (1914–2006), winner of the 2002 physics Nobel Prize
- Jeanette J. Epps (b. 1970), NASA astronaut, CIA intelligence officer
- Charles Fefferman (b. 1949), B.S. 1966, mathematician and child prodigy, winner of the Fields Medal, received his B.S. with honors at the age of 17
- Robert Fischell (b. 1929), M.S. 1953, inventor and physicist, University of Maryland benefactor
- Virgil D. Gligor (b. 1949), pioneer in computer security and applied cryptography
- Kevin Greenaugh (b. 1956), first person of African American descent to earn a PhD in Nuclear Engineering from the University of Maryland; Assistant Deputy Administrator for Strategic Partnership Programs of the National Nuclear Security Administration
- Michael Griffin (b. 1949), NASA administrator
- Victoria Hale, founder and CEO of Institute for OneWorld Health, MacArthur Fellow and adjunct associate professor of biopharmaceutical sciences at University of California, San Francisco, advisor to the World Health Organization
- Sara Hallager, B.S. in zoology, ornithologist and curator of birds at the Smithsonian's National Zoo
- Elaine D. Harmon (1919–2015), B.S. 1940, microbiology; WASP aviator in WWII, inurned at Arlington
- Herbert Hauptman (1917–2011), winner of the 1985 Nobel Prize in Chemistry
- Don Hopkins, free and open source software computer programmer, game designer, hacker, and artist
- Kate Hutton, seismologist at Caltech
- Kenny Kramm (1961–2016), founder of FLAVORx
- Vivek Kundra (b. 1974), chief technology officer for Washington, D.C., advising President Barack Obama's transition committee on technology issues
- George J. Laurer (1925–2019), B.S. 1951, inventor of the universal product code (UPC)
- Russell Marker (1902–1995), B.S. 1923, M.S. 1924, chemist, researcher of steroid chemistry, inventor of octane rating system
- William McCool (1961–2003), NASA astronaut, killed on Columbia mission STS-107
- Sofia Merajver (born 1953), Argentine-born American medical oncologist
- Beverly Mock, Ph.D. 1983, geneticist and deputy director of the National Cancer Institute's Center for Cancer Research.
- Aracely Quispe Neira (b. 1982), M.S. geospatial Intelligence, NASA senior astronautical engineer, professor, researcher
- Sujal Patel, B.S. 1996, president and CEO of Isilon Systems
- Judith Resnik (1949–1986), Ph.D. 1977, NASA astronaut, died aboard the Space Shuttle Challenger
- Paul W. Richards (b. 1964), NASA astronaut who flew on Discovery mission STS-102
- Raymond St. Leger (b. 1957), mycologist, author, and professor
- Alex Severinsky, one of developers of the hybrid engine used in the Prius and in other hybrid vehicles
- Amy Skubitz (b. 1980) immunologist and cancer researcher
- Heather Stapleton, environmental organic chemist and exposure scientist
- Tim Sweeney (b. 1970), computer game programmer and founder of Epic Games
- Grace Wahba (b. 1934), M.A. 1962, statistician, developed generalized cross-validation and formulated Wahba's problem
- Joseph Weber (1919–2000), co-inventor of the maser and father of gravitational wave detection
- Barbara A. Williams, Ph.D. 1981, astrophysicist, first African-American woman to earn a doctorate in astrophysics

== Sports ==
=== Baseball ===
- Brett Cecil (b. 1986), former Major League Baseball (MLB) pitcher
- Wayne Franklin (b. 1974), former MLB pitcher
- Kevin Hart (b. 1982), former Major League Baseball (MLB) pitcher
- Charlie Keller (1916–1990), former MLB player, five-time All-Star selection
- Adam Kolarek (b. 1989), pitcher in the Los Angeles Dodgers organization
- Brandon Lowe (b. 1994), MLB player, All-Star and 2020 American League Champion for the Tampa Bay Rays
- Justin Maxwell (b. 1983), former MLB player
- Eric Milton (b. 1975), MLB player
- LaMonte Wade Jr. (b. 1994) MLB player for the San Francisco Giants

=== Men's basketball ===
Players

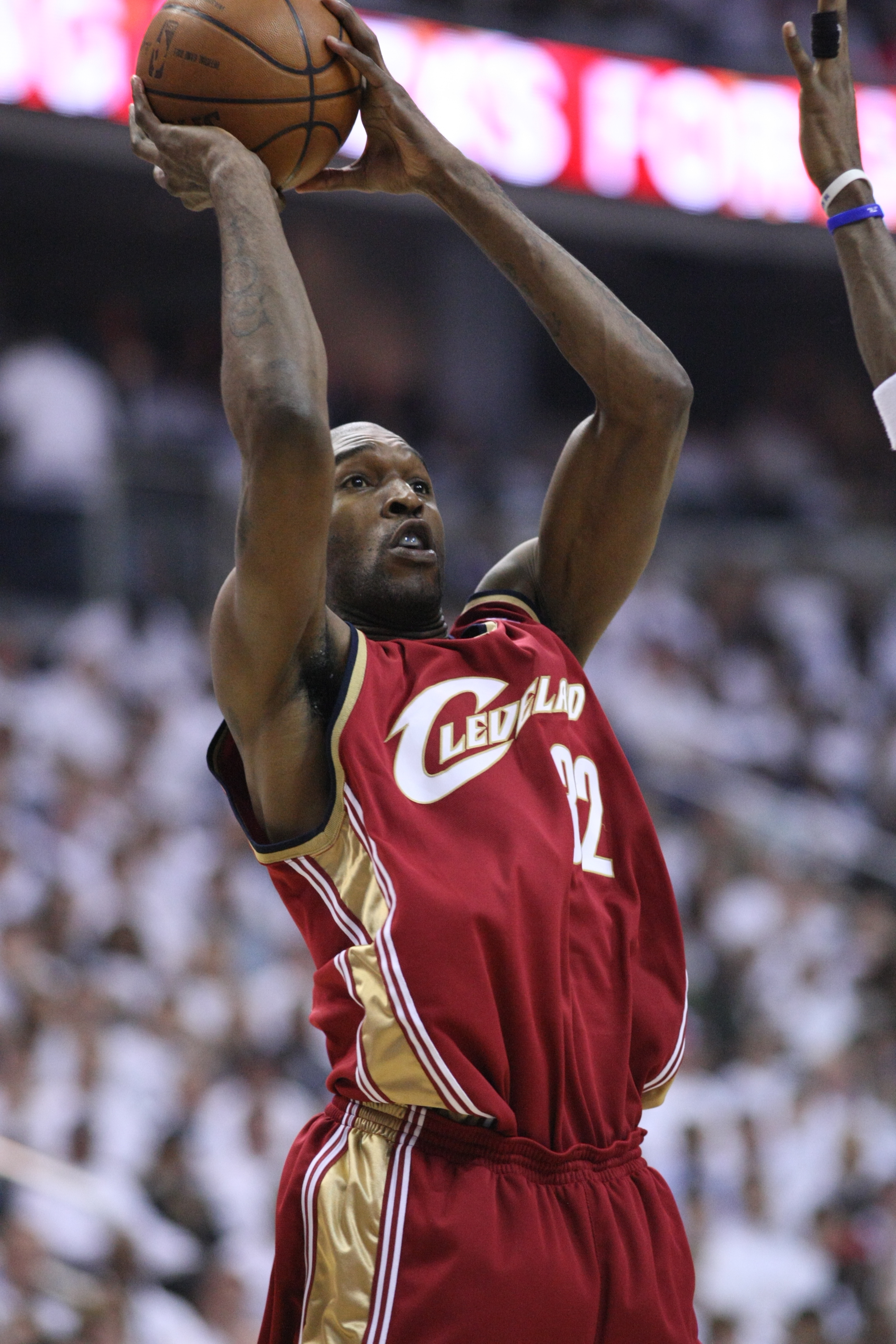
Joe Smith (attended 1993–95), 1995 Naismith College Player of the Year, and No. 1 pick of that season's NBA draft

- Lonny Baxter (b. 1979), former NBA player
- Len Bias (1963–1986), basketball player, 1986 ACC Athlete of the Year
- Steve Blake (b. 1980), NBA player
- Keith Booth (b. 1974), former NBA player
- Adrian Branch (b. 1963), former NBA player
- Nik Caner-Medley (b. 1983), professional basketball player for Maccabi Tel Aviv
- Brad Davis (b. 1955), former NBA player
- Juan Dixon (b. 1978), former NBA player, 2002 NCAA Tournament MOP, ACC Athlete of the Year
- Len Elmore (b. 1952), former NBA player, television sports commentator for ESPN
- Steve Francis (b. 1977), NBA player, 2000 NBA Co-Rookie of the Year
- Jerry Greenspan (1941–2019), former NBA player
- Kevin Huerter (b. 1998), 19th pick of 2018 NBA draft Atlanta Hawks
- Šarūnas Jasikevičius (b. 1976), professional basketball player for Panathinaikos, former NBA player
- Billy Jones, former head coach for the University of Maryland, Baltimore County
- Albert King (b. 1959), former NBA player, 1980 ACC Player of the Year
- Jake Layman (b. 1994), professional basketball player for the Minnesota Timberwolves
- Alex Len (b. 1993), Ukrainian professional basketball player for the Sacramento Kings
- Ricky Lindo (born 2000), American-Panamanian basketball player in the Israeli Basketball Premier League
- John Lucas II (b. 1953), former NBA player and coach, tennis player and coach
- Tony Massenburg (b. 1967), former NBA player
- Tom McMillen (b. 1952), U.S. congressman, former NBA player
- Mike Mentzer (1951–2001), professional bodybuilder and 1979 Mr. Olympia heavyweight champion
- Landon Milbourne (b. 1987), basketball player for Hapoel Eilat of the Israeli Basketball Premier League
- Terence Morris (b. 1979), former NBA and Israel Basketball Premier League player
- Sean Mosley (b. 1989), basketball player for Hapoel Tel Aviv B.C. of the Israeli Basketball Premier League
- Steve Sheppard (b. 1954), former NBA player
- Gene Shue (b. 1931), former NBA player, coach, general manager
- Joe Smith (b. 1975), NBA player, 1995 Naismith College Player of the Year
- Diamond Stone (b. 1997), professional basketball player for the TaiwanBeer HeroBears
- Rasheed Sulaimon (b. 1994), professional basketball player for JL Bourg of LNB Pro A
- Melo Trimble (b. 1995), professional basketball player for Galatasaray Nef
- Greivis Vásquez (b. 1987), NBA player, 2010 ACC Player of the Year, Bob Cousy Award winner
- Dez Wells (b. 1992), professional basketball player for Jiangsu Dragons of the Chinese Basketball Association
- Chris Wilcox (b. 1982), NBA player
- Buck Williams (b. 1960), former NBA player
- Walt Williams (b. 1970), former NBA player

Coaches

- Tom Davis (b. 1938), PhD, head coach at Lafayette, Boston College, Stanford, Iowa, and Drake
- Dave Dickerson (b. 1967), head coach at Tulane
- Chuck Driesell (b. 1962), head coach at The Citadel and Marymount
- Billy Hahn (b. 1953), head coach at La Salle and Ohio Bobcats men's basketball
- Joe Harrington (b. 1945), B.S. 1967, head coach at Colorado, Long Beach State, George Mason, and Hofstra
- Billy Jones, head coach at UMBC
- Jim O'Brien (b. 1952), M.B.A. 1981, NBA head coach
- Gene Shue (1931–2022), head coach of the Baltimore Bullets, Philadelphia 76ers, and Los Angeles Clippers
- Qudus Wahab (b. 2000), basketball player for Maccabi Ashdod of the Israeli Basketball Premier League
- Gary Williams (b. 1945), B.S. 1968, head coach at Maryland, Ohio State, Boston College, and American
- Morgan Wootten (1931–2020), B.S. 1956, DeMatha High School basketball coach, Basketball Hall of Fame inductee, winningest basketball coach at any level
- Tom Young (b. 1932), 1958, head coach at Old Dominion, Rutgers, and American

=== Women's basketball ===
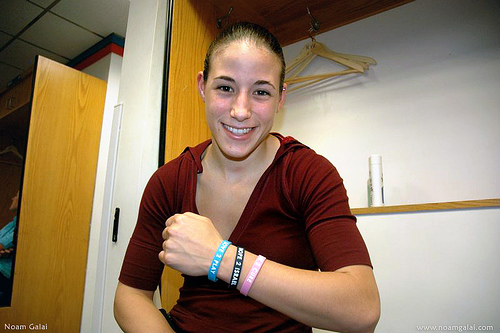
Shay Doron

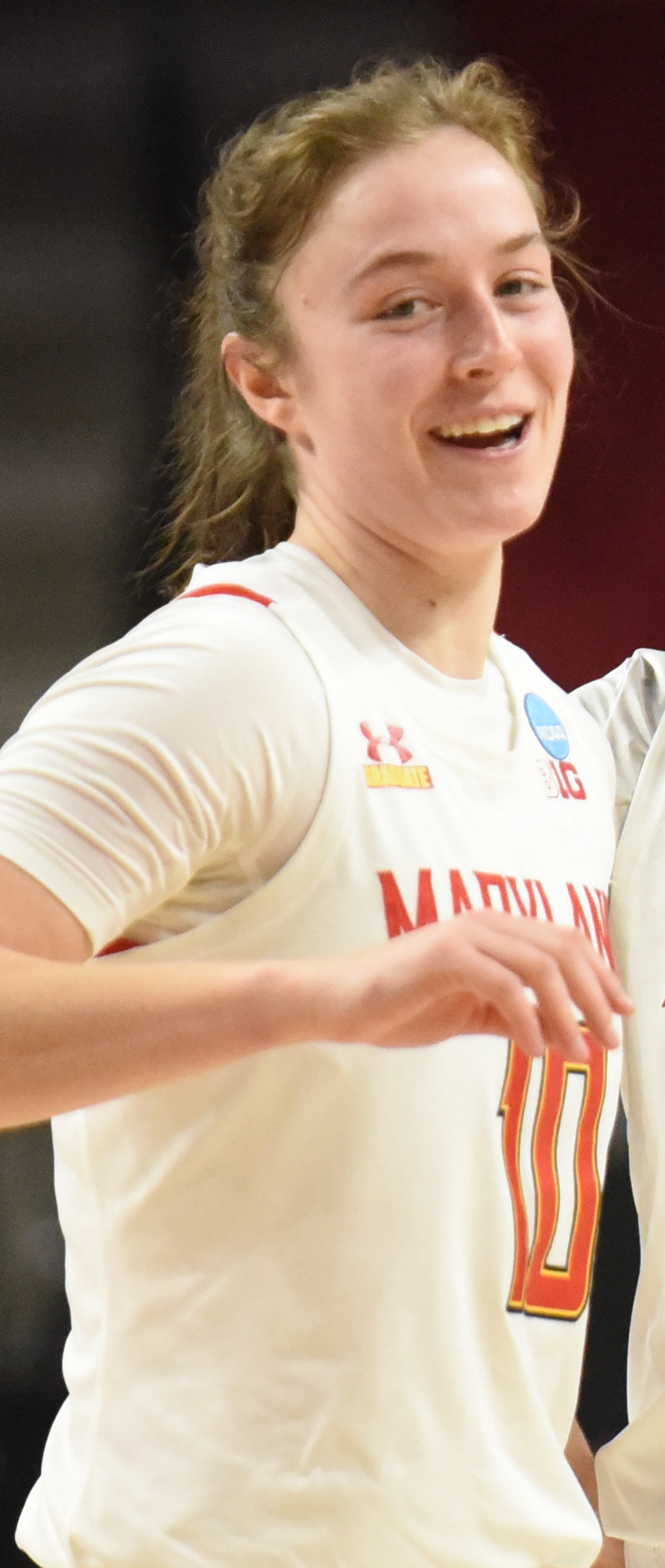
Abby Meyers

Players

- Shakira Austin (b. 2000), center for the Israeli team Elitzur Ramla
- Vicky Bullett (b. 1967), forward, Olympic gold medalist
- Kaila Charles (b. 1998), WNBA player, shooting guard and small forward
- Natasha Cloud (b. 1992), WNBA player, point guard
- Shay Doron (b. 1985), WNBA player, basketball guard (New York Liberty)
- Laura Harper (b. 1986), WNBA player, 2006 NCAA women's basketball tournament MOP
- Abby Meyers (b. 1999), player for the Dallas Wings of the Women's National Basketball Association
- Kristi Toliver (b. 1987), WNBA player
- Shatori Walker-Kimbrough (b. 1995), player for the Israeli team Maccabi Bnot Ashdod, and the Washington Mystics of the Women's National Basketball Association

Coaches

- Chris Weller (b. 1944), 1966, women's basketball coach of the University of Maryland, Women's Basketball Hall of Fame inductee

=== Football ===
Players

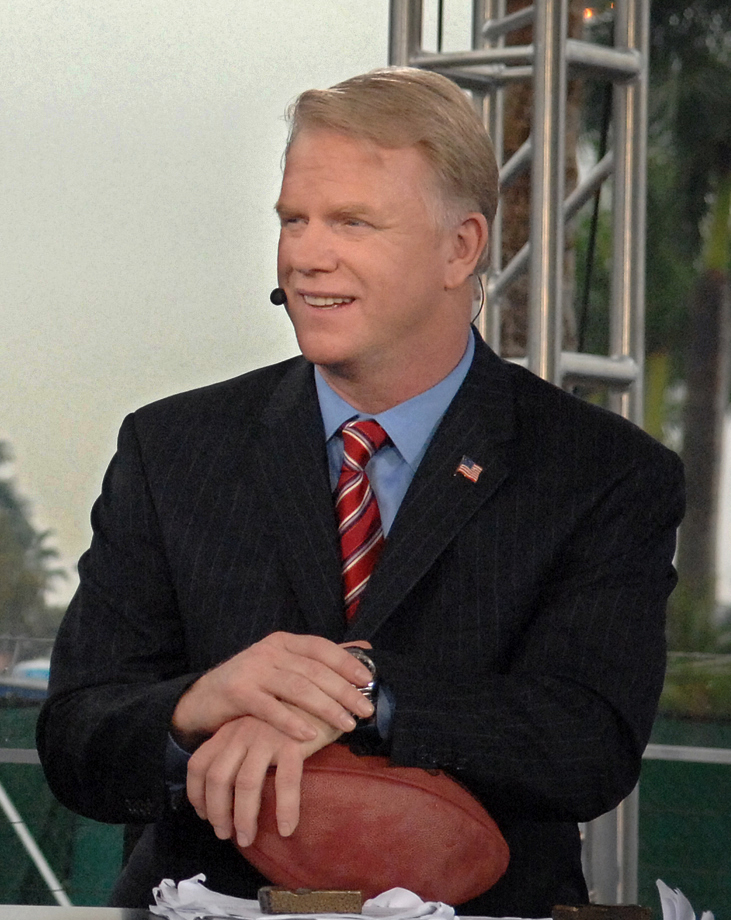
Boomer Esiason (B.A. 1984), quarterback who led the Cincinnati Bengals to Super Bowl XXIII

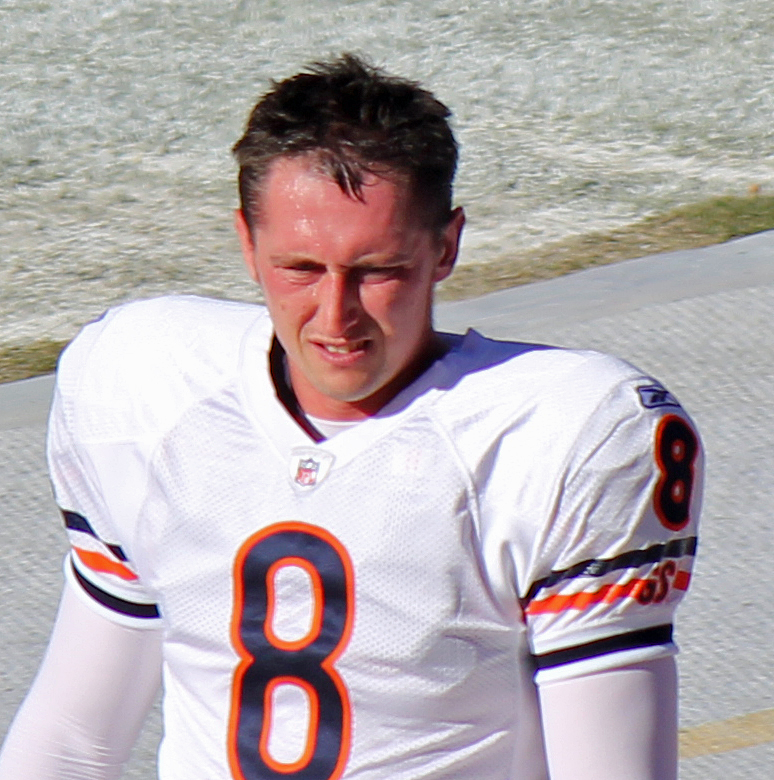
Adam Podlesh, Pittsburgh Steelers

- Deonte Banks (b. 2001), NFL cornerback
- Antoine Brooks (b. 1997), NFL safety
- Dick Bielski (b. 1932), former NFL back, 1955 NFL draft first round pick
- Joe Campbell (b. 1955), former NFL defensive end, three-time Pro Bowler
- Dale Castro (b. 1959), tied NCAA record for most field goals in a half, 1979 consensus All-American
- Cameron Chism (b. 1990), CFL player
- Gary Collins (b. 1940), former NFL wide receiver, 1962 NFL draft first round pick, NFL 1960s All-Decade Team
- Jon Condo (b. 1981), former NFL long snapper, two-time Pro Bowler
- Vernon Davis (b. 1984), former NFL tight end, Super Bowl 50 champion; sixth overall pick in 2006 NFL draft; tied NFL record for most touchdown receptions by a tight end in a season in 2009
- Sean Davis (b. 1993), NFL safety
- Stefon Diggs (b. 1993), NFL wide receiver
- Michael Dunn (b. 1994), NFL offensive lineman
- Trey Edmunds (b. 1994), NFL running back
- Tino Ellis (b. 1997), NFL cornerback
- Boomer Esiason (b. 1961), B.G.S. 1984, former NFL quarterback and current television broadcaster, led the Cincinnati Bengals to Super Bowl XXIII
- Bernie Faloney (1932–1999), former CFL player, 1961 CFL Most Outstanding Player, Canadian Football Hall of Fame inductee
- A. J. Francis (b. 1990), former NFL defensive tackle
- Jake Funk (b. 1997), NFL running back
- Stan Gelbaugh (b. 1962), former NFL quarterback
- Derwin Gray (b. 1995), NFL offensive tackle
- E. J. Henderson (b. 1980), former NFL linebacker, 2001 consensus All-American
- Erin Henderson (b. 1986), former NFL linebacker
- Darrius Heyward-Bey (b. 1987), first wide receiver selected in the 2009 NFL draft (seventh overall pick)
- Shaun Hill (b. 1980), former NFL quarterback
- D'Qwell Jackson (b. 1983), former NFL linebacker
- J. C. Jackson (b. 1995), NFL cornerback, Super Bowl LIII champion
- Quinton Jefferson (b. 1993), NFL defensive end
- Kris Jenkins (b. 1979), NFL defensive tackle, played in Super Bowl XXXVIII
- Ty Johnson (b. 1997), NFL running back
- Stan Jones (1931–2010), former NFL lineman, College and Pro Football Hall of Fame inductee

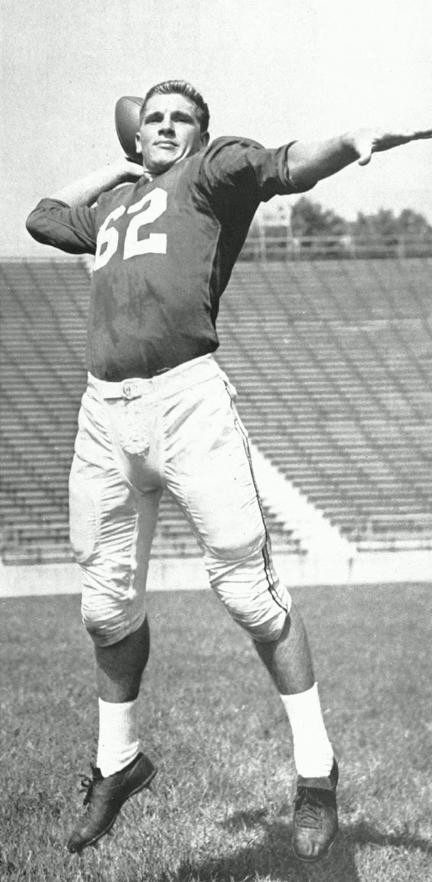
Quarterback Jack Scarbath (B.S. 1954) finished second in the Heisman Trophy voting in 1952.

- LaMont Jordan (b. 1978), former NFL running; 2000 Heisman Trophy candidate
- Darius Kilgo (b. 1991), NFL defensive tackle, two-time Super Bowl champion (50 & LI)
- Mike Kiselak (b. 1967), former CFL All-Star and NFL player
- Pete Koch (b. 1962), former NFL defensive lineman, 1984 NFL draft first round pick
- Ray Krouse (1927–1966), former NFL defensive tackle, three-time NFL champion
- Jermaine Lewis (b. 1974), former NFL wide receiver, two-time Pro Bowler
- Shawne Merriman (b. 1984), NFL linebacker, 2005 NFL draft first round pick, 2005 NFL Defensive Rookie of the Year
- Dick Modzelewski (1931–2018), former NFL tackle and head coach, College Football Hall of Fame inductee
- Ed Modzelewski (1929–2015), former NFL back, 1952 NFL draft first-round pick
- D. J. Moore (b. 1997), NFL wide receiver, first round pick in 2018 NFL draft (24th overall)
- Yannick Ngakoue (b. 1995), NFL defensive end
- Nick Novak (b. 1981), former NFL placekicker
- Neil O'Donnell (b. 1966), former NFL quarterback, played in Super Bowl XXX
- Bob Pellegrini (1934–2008), former NFL linebacker, College Football Hall of Fame inductee
- Adam Podlesh (b. 1983), former NFL punter
- Frank Reich (b. 1961), former NFL quarterback, held both the NFL and NCAA records for the largest margin second half comebacks
- Darnell Savage (b. 1997), NFL safety, first round pick in the 2019 NFL draft (21st overall)
- Jack Scarbath (1930–2020), B.S. 1954, former NFL quarterback, 1952 Heisman Trophy runner-up, College Football Hall of Fame inductee
- Chad Scott (b. 1974), former NFL cornerback, 1997 NFL draft first round pick
- Da'Rel Scott (b. 1988), former NFL running back, Super Bowl XLVI champion
- Geroy Simon (b. 1975), CFL wide receiver, 2006 CFL Most Outstanding Player
- Ron Solt (b. 1962), former NFL guard, 1984 NFL draft first round pick
- Steve Suter (b. 1982), set multiple NCAA kick and punt return records
- Torrey Smith (b. 1989), former NFL wide receiver, two-time Super Bowl champion (XLVII & LII)
- Mike Tice (b. 1959), former NFL head coach
- Joe Vellano (b. 1988), former NFL defensive tackle, Super Bowl XLIX champion
- Al Wallace (b. 1974), NFL defensive end, played in Super Bowl XXXVIII
- Bob Ward (1927–2005), only player ever named an Associated Press first-team All-American at both an offensive and defense position, College Football Hall of Fame inductee
- Randy White (b. 1953), former NFL defensive lineman, college and Pro Football Hall of Fame inductee
- LaQuan Williams (b. 1988), former NFL wide receiver, Super Bowl XLVII champion
- Frank Wycheck (b. 1971), former NFL tight end, three-time Pro Bowler

Coaches

- Dick Bielski (b. 1932), Washington Federals head coach (1984)
- Brooke Brewer (1894–1970), Akron Pros head coach (1922)
- Curley Byrd (1889–1970), Maryland head coach (1911–1934)
- Tom Chisari (1922–1995), Catholic head coach (1948)
- Mark Duda (b. 1961), Lackawanna College head coach (1994– )
- Bill Elias (1923–1998), George Washington (1960), Virginia (1961–1964), and Navy (1965–1968) head coach
- Jack Faber (1903–1994), Maryland head coach (1935, 1940–1941)
- Ralph Friedgen (b. 1947), Maryland head coach (2001–2010)
- Joe Gardi (1939–2010), Philadelphia Bell (1975) and Hofstra (1990–2005) head coach
- Jim LaRue (1925–2015), Arizona head coach (1959–1966)
- Dick Modzelewski (1931–2018), Cleveland Browns head coach (1977)
- Tommy Mont (1922–2012), DePauw head coach (1959–1976)
- Joe Moss (b. 1930), Ottawa Rough Riders head coach (1974)
- Frank Navarro (1930–2021), Columbia (1968–1973), Wabash (1974–1978), and Princeton (1978–1984) head coach
- Dick Nolan (1932–2007), San Francisco 49ers (1968–1975) and New Orleans Saints (1978–1980) head coach
- William W. Skinner (1874–1953), Maryland (1892) and Arizona (1900–1901) head coach
- Mike Tice (b. 1959), Minnesota Vikings head coach (2001–2005)
- Ron Waller (1933–2018), San Diego Chargers head coach (1973)

=== Lacrosse ===
- Jen Adams (b. 1980), B.A. 2001, former women's lacrosse player, Tewaaraton Trophy recipient, head coach of Loyola University Maryland
- Bud Beardmore (1939–2016), 1962, lacrosse player and coach, two national championships, 1973 Coach of the Year, National Lacrosse Hall of Fame inductee
- Grant Catalino, 2011, MLL player with Rochester
- Jack Faber (1903–1994), B.S. 1926, M.S. 1927, Ph.D. 1937, lacrosse coach, eight national championships, 1959 Coach of the Year, National Lacrosse Hall of Fame inductee
- Al Heagy (1906–1990), B.S. 1930, lacrosse player and coach, seven national championships, National Lacrosse Hall of Fame inductee
- John Howard (1934–2007), M.A. 1962, Ph.D. 1967, lacrosse coach, 1967 national co-championship, National Lacrosse Hall of Fame inductee
- Frank Urso (b. 1954), lacrosse player, National Lacrosse Hall of Fame inductee, one of just four college lacrosse players all-time to earn first-team All-America honors all four seasons

=== Soccer ===
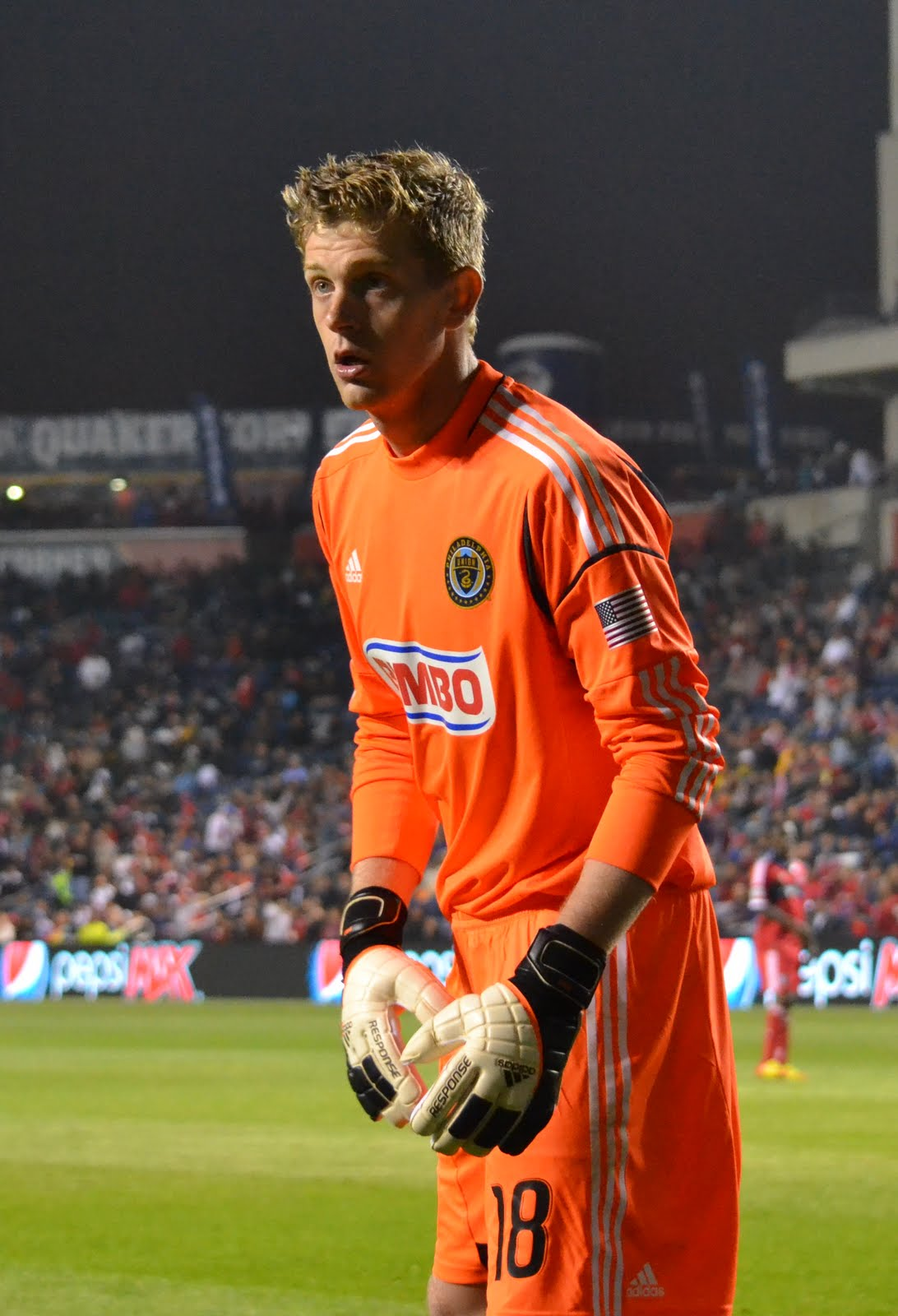
Zac MacMath

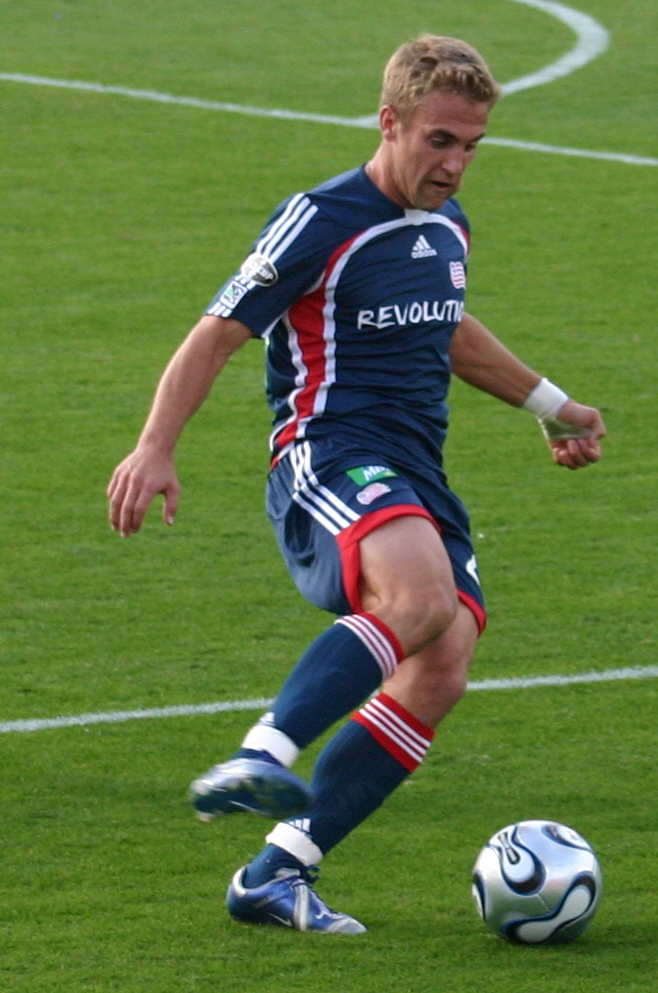
Taylor Twellman (attended 1998–1999), 2005 Major League Soccer MVP

- Marc Burch (b. 1984), Colorado Rapids
- A. J. DeLaGarza (b. 1987), LA Galaxy
- Maurice Edu (b. 1986), Major League Soccer (MLS) player, first overall pick of the 2007 MLS SuperDraft
- Omar Gonzalez (b. 1988), Major League Soccer (MLS) player, 2011 MLS Defender of the Year, Two MLS Championships
- Clarence Goodson (b. 1982), San Jose Earthquakes
- Jeremy Hall (b. 1988), Toronto F.C.
- Taylor Kemp (b. 1990), D.C. United
- Zac MacMath (b. 1991), goalkeeper in Major League Soccer, fifth overall pick of the 2011 MLS SuperDraft; Colorado Rapids
- Dan Metzger (b. 1993), D.C. United
- Patrick Mullins (b. 1992), New York City FC
- Chris Odoi-Atsem (b. 1995), D.C. United
- Robbie Rogers (b. 1987), LA Galaxy
- Jake Rozhansky (b. 1996), American-Israeli midfielder for MLS Next Pro club New England Revolution II
- Chris Seitz (b. 1987), MLS player, fourth overall pick of the 2007 MLS SuperDraft
- Alex Shinsky (b. 1993), Chicago Fire
- Zack Steffen (b. 1995), Colorado Rapids and United States men's national soccer team player
- John Stertzer (b. 1990), Real Salt Lake
- Schillo Tshuma (b. 1992), Portland Timbers
- Taylor Twellman (b. 1980), MLS and United States men's national soccer team player, 2005 MLS MVP
- Rodney Wallace (b. 1988), Portland Timbers
- Ethan White (b. 1991), Philadelphia Union
- London Woodberry (b. 1991), New England Revolution
- Graham Zusi (b. 1986), Sporting Kansas City

=== Track and field ===
- Dominic Berger, track and field athlete
- Paula Girven (1958–2020), high jumper
- Renaldo Nehemiah (b. 1959), B.A. 1981, track athlete, former holder of the 110m hurdle and current holder of the 55m hurdles world records

=== Other ===
- Deane Beman (b. 1938), commissioner of the PGA Tour (1974–94), World Golf Hall of Fame inductee
- Tim Brant (b. 1949), sports television commentator
- Joe Castiglione (b. 1957), athletic director of the University of Oklahoma
- Arthur Cook (1928–2021), Olympic sport shooter
- Dominique Dawes (b. 1976), Olympic gymnast for the 1992, 1996, 2000 U.S. teams
- Dick Dull (c. 1945), athletic director of the University of Maryland (1981–1986) and California State University, Northridge (1999–2005), among others
- Geary Eppley (1895–1978), B.S. 1920, M.S. 1926, athletic director of the University of Maryland (1937–1947)
- Fred Funk (b. 1956), professional golfer on the PGA Tour
- Abby Gustaitis (b. 1991), rugby player, US National team
- Jim Kehoe (1918–2010), 1940, athletic director of the University of Maryland (1969–78)
- Ashley Nee (b. 1989), Olympic slalom canoeist
- Travis Pastrana (b. 1983), motorsports competitor and stuntman
- Donald Spero (b. 1939), Olympic and world champion rower

== Miscellaneous ==
- Frank Chuman (1917–2022), JD 1945, first Asian American law student at the University of Maryland
- Elaine J. Coates (b. 1937), BA 1959, first African American to graduate from University of Maryland, College Park
- Aryeh Kaplan (1934–1983) (BA 1961), American Orthodox rabbi, author, and translator known for his knowledge of physics and kabbalah
- H. David Kotz (b. 1966), attorney
- Ronni Karpen Moffitt, political activist murdered along with Orlando Letelier by Chilean agents
- Sarah M. Pritchard, academic librarian
- Valerie Solanas (1936–1988), B.A. 1957, shot Andy Warhol in 1968; author of the SCUM Manifesto and the unpublished play Up Your Ass
- Jean Worthley (1925–2017), naturalist and former host of Hodgepodge Lodge, co-host of On Nature's Trail

== Faculty ==
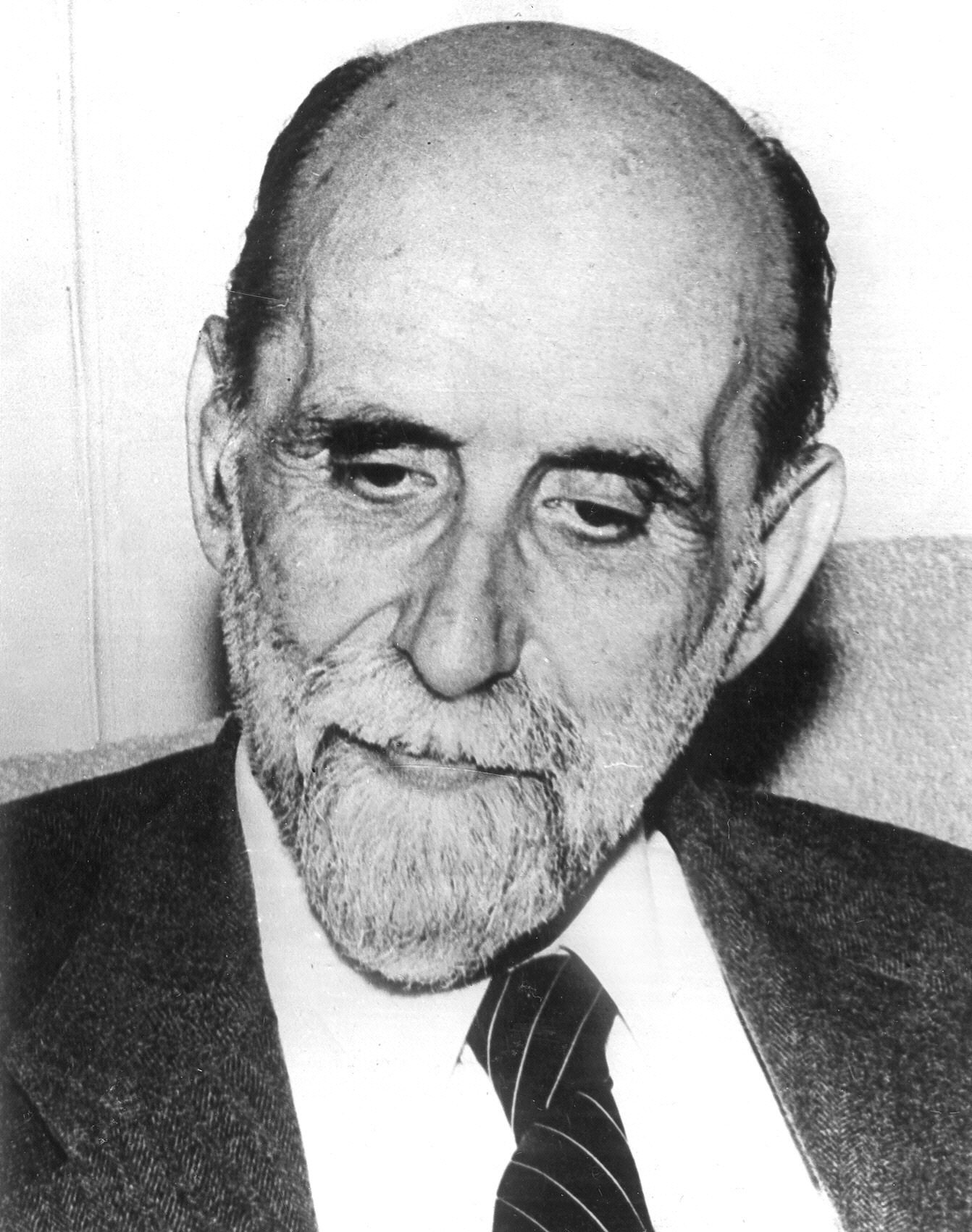
Professor Juan Ramón Jiménez won the Nobel Prize in Literature in 1956

The following individuals serve or served on the University of Maryland faculty, but are not necessarily alumni.

- Lynn Bolles (b. 1949), professor of women's studies
- Gertrude Ehrlich (1923–2025), professor of mathematics
- Bassam Fayad, professor of mathematics
- Tim Foecke (b. 1963), research professor, Department of Materials Science and Engineering
- John D. Gannon (1948–1999), department chair and professor, Computer Science
- Patricia Greenspan, professor of philosophy
- Clara E. Hill, professor of psychology, former president of the Society for Psychotherapy Research and editor of the Journal of Counseling Psychology
- Juan Ramón Jiménez (1881–1958), professor of Spanish language and literature, 1956 Nobel Prize in Literature
- Arthur Johnson (b. 1941), professor emeritus of Bioengineering
- Barys Kit (1910–2018), professor of mathematics at the European College
- Robert P. Kolker, professor emeritus of English, author of books on film/media/cultural studies
- Zhanqing Li, Distinguished University Professor in the department of Atmospheric and Oceanic Science
- Hayim Lapin, professor of Jewish Studies and History; director of the Joseph and Rebecca Meyerhoff Program and Center for Jewish Studies
- K. J. Ray Liu (b. 1961), professor of A. James Clark School of Engineering; IEEE president and CEO
- Hoda Mahmoudi, research professor and Bahá’í Chair for World Peace
- John C. Mather (b. 1946), astrophysicist and adjunct physics professor, 2006 Nobel Prize in Physics
- Claire Moses (b. 1941), historian, women's studies scholar, professor emerita
- Hugh V. Perkins (1918–1988), child development and gerontology educator, author, and former professor of education, Institute for Child Study, Department of Human Development
- William Daniel Phillips (b. 1948), adjunct professor of physics, 1997 Nobel Prize in Physics for contributions in laser cooling
- Thomas Schelling (1921–2016), professor emeritus, economics and public policy, 2005 Nobel Memorial Prize in Economic Sciences for game theory analysis
- Horace M. Trent (1907–1964), associate professor of physics, best known for finding that a bullwhip's crack is a sonic boom and for being the author of the currently accepted force-current analogy in physics known as the Trent analogy
- David P. Weber, academic director and lecturer, accounting and information assurance, Woodrow Wilson Visiting Fellow
- Arthur K. Wheelock Jr., professor of art history
- Michael R. Zachariah, distinguished professor of chemical engineering and chemistry

== Benefactors ==
This list is intended to capture the notable benefactors and other people connected with the University of Maryland, College Park, but who were not alumni, unless noted with a year of graduation.

- Steve Bisciotti (b. 1960), owner of the Baltimore Ravens, benefactor of the athletics program, and personal friend of former men's basketball coach Gary Williams
- Michael D. Dingman (1931–2017) (B.A. 1955), international investor
- Jack Heise (1924–2009) (B.A. 1947), longtime benefactor of the athletics program
- Glenn L. Martin (1886–1955), aircraft pioneer for which the institute of technology is named
- Theodore R. McKeldin (1900–1974), governor of Maryland, 1951–1959
- Philip Merrill (1934–2006), media mogul and namesake of the college of journalism
- Thomas V. Mike Miller, Jr. (1942–2021) (B.S. 1964), president of the Maryland Senate
- Robert Novak (1931–2009), journalist and benefactor the athletics program
- Kevin Plank (b. 1972) (B.A. 1996), founder and CEO of Under Armour apparel
- Susan Carroll Schwab (b. 1955), former U.S. trade representative and former dean of the School of Public Policy
