= Zhanqing Li =

Chinese American atmospheric and environmental scientist

- Occupations: Atmospheric and environmental scientist

Academic background
- Education: BSc., Meteorology; MSc., Meteorology; PhD., Atmospheric and Oceanic Sciences
- Alma mater: Nanjing University of Information Science and Technology; McGill University

Academic work
- Institutions: University of Maryland, College Park

Zhanqing Li is a Chinese-American atmospheric and environmental scientist, serving as a Distinguished University Professor in the Department of Atmospheric and Oceanic Science at the University of Maryland, College Park.

Li's work has been focused in atmospheric and environmental sciences, climate, remote sensing He has been ranked among the world's top 0.1% most cited scientists.

Li is a fellow of the American Association for the Advancement of Science, the American Geophysical Union, and the American Meteorological Society.

== Education and career ==
Born in Luoyang, Henan, China, Li received his B.Sc. and M.Sc. from Nanjing University of Information Science and Technology (NUIST) in 1983 and 1986, respectively, and earned his Ph.D. from McGill University, Canada, in 1991. His career began at the China Meteorological Administration, where he worked as a junior researcher for one year. After receiving his Ph.D., he conducted postdoctoral research at the Meteorological Service of Canada (1991–1992), and was then hired as a research scientist at the Canada Centre for Remote Sensing for 9 years. In 2001, he joined the University of Maryland, College Park, as a full professor in the Department of Atmospheric and Oceanic Sciences, and he has been a Distinguished University Professor since 2022.

He has also held editorial roles with journals including the Journal of Geophysical Research and Atmospheric Chemistry and Physics.

== Research ==
Li's research is concerned with earth's radiation budget, aerosol, cloud, aerosol-cloud-interactions, aerosol-radiation-interactions, air pollution and impact on severe weather and climate change, planetary boundary layers, biomass burning, and their impacts on public health. He has developed original remote sensing algorithms and products of atmospheric and environmental variables. He has published in journals including Nature, Science, and The Lancet. He received the Canadian Government's Head of Public Service Award in 1998, the 2014 Yoram J. Kaufman Research Award from the American Geophysical Union, and the Humboldt Research Award from the Alexander von Humboldt Foundation in 2015.

Li's work has encompassed research and discoveries across atmospheric, environmental, terrestrial sciences, and public health disciplines with main foci in the Earth's radiation budget, aerosol impacts on clouds and precipitation, satellite algorithm and product development, climate-environment interactions, fire monitoring systems, and extensive aerosol, climate, and environmental studies.

Li has fostered partnerships between the US and Canada, which supported the CloudSat mission, and between the US and China, leading the NASA's EAST-AIRE project and DOE's ARM/AMF field experiment in China. He has been engaged in US and international research programs like ARM (Atmospheric Radiation Measurement), ERBE (Earth Radiation Budget Experiment), SRB (Surface Radiation Budget), GACP (Global Aerosol Climatology Project), and LCLUC (Land Cover and Land Use Change). He led the project FIRE-M3 (Fire Monitoring, Mapping and Modeling) in Canada. He has also served on the science teams of France's ScaRaB and EU's Fire initiatives.

=== Solar radiation budget analysis through satellite algorithms ===
Li has studied the Earth's solar radiation budget (SRB), the driving force of the climate system, and developed satellite-based algorithms to retrieve global SRB. His parameterized SRB algorithm has been employed in NASA's ERBE and CERES satellite programs to generate global SRB datasets.

Li has estimated the global solar energy distribution from satellite with 25–30% systematic changes in the solar radiation disposition relative to previous estimates, reducing surface absorption and increasing atmospheric absorption. He has helped identify and resolved model deficiencies concerning model treatments of water vapor absorption, surface albedo, and aerosol absorption, addressed debates on cloud absorption anomalies and provided insights into solar radiative processes and their representation in climate models.

=== The cloud absorption anomaly ===
Li's research challenged the once-growing acceptance of the cloud absorption anomaly (CAA), a historical paradox dated to 1957 through 1990s suggesting clouds absorb more solar radiation than theoretical calculations. Using global satellite and ground-based observations alongside model simulations, he found that the amount of solar radiation absorbed by clouds generally aligned with model estimates, with the exception in some tropical regions. This conclusion was further supported by a detailed study and the development of a new analysis method. The enhanced absorption observed in the tropics was later linked to smoke from tropical burning.

To address the CAA, the U.S. Department of Energy's ARM program sponsored a field campaign in the southern Great Plains in 1995, with initial findings supporting CAA based on aircraft measurements, but Li identified inconsistencies between the aircraft data and observations from other platforms, prompting another field campaign in 2000. Following this experiment, no significant CAA was found, although some model underestimation remained, which was attributed to surface albedo effects rather than clouds, prompting more efforts to document albedo changes.

Li and his team further attributed the claimed cloud absorption anomaly to artifacts due to deficiencies in observation, analysis methods and dated radiative transfer models, while he discovered the real causes of the CAA to lack and/or inadequate treatments of aerosol and water vapor absorption, as reported in his publications in Nature and Science.

=== Remote sensing of cloud layers, cloud droplet size, cloud condensation nuclei, cloud updraft speed and warm rainfall ===
In collaboration with Fu-Lung Chang, he established retrieval algorithms to generate a global climatology of 3D cloud distributions from a passive satellite sensor MODIS, capturing both single-layer and dual-layer thin-over-thick clouds. This work corrected biases in earlier satellite products that misrepresented such dual-layer clouds as single mid-level clouds, aiding improvements in General Circulation Models (GCM). He also utilized MODIS's spectral channels to derive vertical variations in cloud effective radius (DER), enabling more accurate estimates of cloud liquid water path, identification of cloud development stages, and detection of warm rain from boundary-layer clouds using satellite data acquired by passive sensors.

Li's team devised original satellite-based approaches to retrieve cloud base updraft speed (Wb) and cloud condensation nuclei (CCN) concentrations, led by Y. Zheng in collaboration with D. Rosenfeld. These methods, designed for different cloud types, relied on relationships with meteorological parameters derived from satellite and reanalysis data, provided observational evidence for the role of cloud-base height in regulating updrafts and proposed a theory on the surface coupling of marine stratocumulus clouds, supported by ship-based and satellite measurements.

=== Aerosols and climate interactions ===
Li led a GEWEX working group to assess various aerosol retrieval algorithms and products and recommended a series of efforts to lower large uncertainties in the retrieval of aerosol optical depth and radiative forcing, followed by a wide range of investigations concerning aerosol-radiation-interaction (ARI) and aerosol-cloud-interaction (ACI) with a keystone finding that aerosols drastically alter cloud and precipitation by suppressing low cloud and light rain, and invigorating deep clouds and heavy rain, as reported in Nature Geoscience (2011), and Science in collaboration with J. Fan. Their findings were cited and reported by various media outlets. His team conducted studies concerning broad interactions between air pollution and climate changes, especially in Asian monsoon regions as reviewed in Review of Geophysics.

Li and his team revealed aerosol-induced changes in temperature, precipitation, storms, and lightning. He has also characterized biomass burning aerosols from tropical to boreal forests, devising methods to estimate their optical properties and radiative forcing using ground-based and aircraft measurements, as well as space-borne data. His research demonstrated the distinct characteristics of boreal forest smoke aerosols, including their ability to circulate globally and reach the stratosphere, led by M. Fromm, G. Kablick and K. Junghenn-Noyes. Additionally, he has delved into aerosol retrieval algorithms and products, identifying discrepancies in existing datasets, extending coverage to land surfaces, and providing critical reviews of inversion techniques.

=== East-Asian aerosols and climate ===
Outside of the US, Li has focused on the climatic effects of aerosols in East Asia, particularly in China. In 2004–2010, he led the East Asian Study of Tropospheric Aerosols, a Regional International Experiment (EAST-AIRE). The project established a nationwide aerosol observation network with 25 stations measuring aerosol optical properties, single scattering albedo, and radiative effects, and three observation campaigns with a series of findings published in 18 peer-reviewed papers, such as the first observation-based estimates of aerosol loading, optical properties and cloud vertical structure across China.

In 2008, Li directed US-China joint field experiment by deploying the DOE's Atmospheric Radiation Measurement (ARM) Mobile Facility. The experiment provided measurements that contributed to the understanding of aerosols' impact on radiation, clouds, and climate, assisted in validating satellite products, identified deficiencies in remote sensing products over the region, and suggested solutions. His work also characterized aerosol properties at key sites, identified pollutant transport mechanisms, and developed methods for analyzing sulfate aerosols and estimating aerosol scattering, resulting in scientific publications.

=== Air pollution monitoring by machine learning: particulate matter (PM) and trace gases ===
In 2001, Li developed a method of tracking fire smoke using a neural network algorithm. Later, his team applied modern ML/AI models to monitor surface air pollutants on global and regional scales, including particulate matter (PM_{1}, PM_{2.5}, PM_{10}), black carbon (BC), and gaseous pollutants such as ozone, NO_{2}, SO_{2}, CO, and aerosol chemical species using data from various satellite sensors, ground observation networks and model simulations, led by J. Wei. The global 1 km PM_{2.5} product revealed the episodical trends and wave-like evolution of air pollution associated with COVID-19 and mortality rate. They also estimated daily 1 km PM_{2.5} and black carbon (BC) concentrations across the US over two decades and found that the increasing trends of fire activities in western US have reversed the trend of air quality improvement, published in Lancet Planetary Health in 2023.

=== Remote sensing of planetary boundary layer (PBL) and PBL-cloud-coupling, and understanding their interactions ===
Li's team has conducted a series of planetary boundary layer (PBL)-related studies including PBL-pollutant-interactions, PBL-cloud-interaction, PBL-aerosol-cloud interactions, and remote sensing of PBL. By merging with meteorological data, the team developed novel remote sensing methods to determine PBL height and PBL-cloud-coupling. The PBL algorithm has been applied to CALIPSO and CATS satellites to generate global PBL products and ARM's ground measurements to develop a long-term PBL climatology. By applying remote sensing techniques, microphysical theory, and numerical modeling, they have addressed challenges to advance PBL observation, improving the understanding of fundamental PBL processes, and explore their interactions with aerosols and clouds, as well as entrainment rate, which are used for weather forecasting and future climate projections. The PBL related studies were led by T. Su, V. Sawyer and N. Roldán-Henao.

=== Development of the fire monitoring, mapping and modeling (FIRE/M3) system and satellite-based fire products ===
Li led a team to guide the development of fire monitoring around the world, and a Canadian team for the development of the first satellite-based fire monitoring, mapping, and modeling system (FIRE/M3) across Canada, winning the Head of Public Service Award and the Alouette Award. His team advanced remote sensing technologies for detecting fire hotspots and mapping burned areas in boreal forests, introduced biomass estimation using passive optical sensors, in collaboration with R. Fraser. They validated these techniques using ground-truth data, created a modeling system for estimating trace gas emissions from fires, and generated the first 1-km daily fire data for North America.

=== Fundamental remote sensing methodology ===
Li's contributions to fundamental remote sensing methodology include scene, cloud in particular, identification, bidirectional reflectance distribution function (BRDF), and narrow-to-broadband conversion. He presented a threshold algorithm to identify thin Arctic clouds over snow or ice-covered areas using AVHRR data and used these advancements to assess polar cloud radiative forcing, leading to corrections to earlier estimates. In addition, he led the application of a neural network approach to distinguish between smoke, clouds, and clear land.

=== Remote sensing of canopy-absorbed photosynthetically active radiation (PAR) and ultraviolet (UV) radiation ===
Li has contributed to remote sensing techniques for measuring canopy absorbed photosynthetically active radiation (APAR) and surface UV-B radiation. In response to the challenges in determining APAR due to cloud effects, he developed a method leveraging minimal cloud absorption in PAR wavelengths to estimate the total PAR absorbed by ecosystems without the need of acquiring cloud parameters and thus circumventing a major source of error. He further refined this approach with a canopy radiative transfer model to calculate the fraction absorbed by green foliage, enabling accurate APAR determination under diverse weather and surface conditions. Moreover, he formulated an algorithm to infer surface UV-B irradiance and erythemal dose rates from satellite data, treating UV radiative transfer in distinct atmospheric layers and using inputs like TOMS ozone measurements and visible channels from AVHRR and GOES.

== Media ==
Li's scientific findings have been covered in media outlets such as The New York Times, Discovery Channel, CBS News, and The Globe and Mail. In 2004, he appeared on the cover of Science as a representative figure of foreign-born scientists in the United States.

== Awards and honors ==
- 1998 – Head of Public Service Award, Government of Canada
- 2000 - Alouette Award, Canadian Aeronautics and Space Institute
- 2014 – Yoram J. Kaufman Research Award, American Geophysical Union
- 2014 – Fellow, American Geophysical Union
- 2015 – Humboldt Research Award, Alexander von Humboldt Foundation
- 2015 – Fellow, American Association for Advancement of Sciences
- 2016 – Fellow, American Meteorological Society
- 2020–2024 – Highly Cited Researcher in the Field of Geosciences, Web of Science
- 2022 – Distinguished University Professor, University of Maryland, College Park
- 2023 – Fulbright Specialist Award, university de Lille, France
- 2026 – Verner E. Suomi Technology Medal, American Meteorological Society

== Selected articles ==
- Li, Zhanqing; Barker, Howard W.; Moreau, Louis (August 1995). "The variable effect of clouds on atmospheric absorption of solar radiation". Nature. 376 (6540): 486–490. Bibcode:1995Natur.376..486L. doi:10.1038/376486a0.
- Li, Zhanqing; Ackerman, Thomas P.; Wiscombe, Warren; Stephens, Graeme L. (14 November 2003). "Have Clouds Darkened Since 1995?". Science. 302 (5648): 1151–1152. doi:10.1126/science.302.5648.1151. PMID 14615515.
- Li, Zhanqing; Niu, Feng; Fan, Jiwen; Liu, Yangang; Rosenfeld, Daniel; Ding, Yanni (December 2011). "Long-term impacts of aerosols on the vertical development of clouds and precipitation". Nature Geoscience. 4 (12): 888–894. Bibcode:2011NatGe...4..888L. doi:10.1038/ngeo1313.
- Tao, Wei-Kuo; Chen, Jen-Ping; Li, Zhanqing; Wang, Chien; Zhang, Chidong (June 2012). "Impact of aerosols on convective clouds and precipitation". Reviews of Geophysics. 50 (2) 2011RG000369. Bibcode:2012RvGeo..50.2001T. doi:10.1029/2011RG000369.
- Li, Zhanqing; Lau, W. K.-M.; Ramanathan, V.; Wu, G.; Ding, Y.; Manoj, M. G.; Liu, J.; Qian, Y.; Li, J.; Zhou, T.; Fan, J.; Rosenfeld, D.; Ming, Y.; Wang, Y.; Huang, J.; Wang, B.; Xu, X.; Lee, S.-S.; Cribb, M.; Zhang, F.; Yang, X.; Zhao, C.; Takemura, T.; Wang, K.; Xia, X.; Yin, Y.; Zhang, H.; Guo, J.; Zhai, P. M.; Sugimoto, N.; Babu, S. S.; Brasseur, G. P. (December 2016). "Aerosol and monsoon climate interactions over Asia". Reviews of Geophysics. 54 (4): 866–929. Bibcode:2016RvGeo..54..866L. doi:10.1002/2015RG000500. hdl:11858/00-001M-0000-002C-8D39-2.
- Fan, Jiwen; Rosenfeld, Daniel; Zhang, Yuwei; Giangrande, Scott E.; Li, Zhanqing; Machado, Luiz A. T.; Martin, Scot T.; Yang, Yan; Wang, Jian; Artaxo, Paulo; Barbosa, Henrique M. J.; Braga, Ramon C.; Comstock, Jennifer M.; Feng, Zhe; Gao, Wenhua; Gomes, Helber B.; Mei, Fan; Pöhlker, Christopher; Pöhlker, Mira L.; Pöschl, Ulrich; de Souza, Rodrigo A. F. (26 January 2018). "Substantial convection and precipitation enhancements by ultrafineaerosol particles". Science. 359 (6374): 411–418. Bibcode:2018Sci...359..411F. doi:10.1126/science.aan8461. hdl:11603/34773. PMID 29371462.
- Li, Zhanqing; Guo, Jianping; Ding, Aijun; Liao, Hong; Liu, Jianjun; Sun, Yele; Wang, Tijian; Xue, Huiwen; Zhang, Hongsheng; Zhu, Bin (November 2017). "Aerosol and boundary-layer interactions and impact on air quality". National Science Review. 4 (6): 810–833. doi:10.1093/nsr/nwx117.
- Wei, Jing; Li, Zhanqing; Lyapustin, Alexei; Wang, Jun; Dubovik, Oleg; Schwartz, Joel; Sun, Lin; Li, Chi; Liu, Song; Zhu, Tong (15 December 2023). "First close insight into global daily gapless 1 km PM2.5 pollution, variability, and health impact". Nature Communications. 14 (1): 8349. doi:10.1038/s41467-023-43862-3. PMC 10724144. PMID 38102117.
