= Billy Jones (basketball) =

American basketball player

William Jones, also known as Billy Jones, is an American former basketball power forward. Jones attended the University of Maryland where he played for the Terrapins and in December 1965 became the first black player in the Atlantic Coast Conference. He lettered in basketball three years and played two seasons alongside future Hall of Fame Maryland head coach Gary Williams. By 1971, every school in the ACC had at least one African-American on its team. The Jones-Hill House is named in his honor, along with Darryl Hill.
