= Janet Blair (singer-songwriter) =

American singer-songwriter

Janet Blair is an independent pop/Christian singer-songwriter from New Mexico. Originally trained as a classical oboist at the University of Maryland, Blair played with multiple ensembles, including the Georgetown Quintet and All Points West, including some experimental/modern work. Blair moved to New Mexico in 2013, playing for the El Paso Symphony Orchestra, the Las Cruces Symphony Orchestra, and collaborating with local musicians.

Blair turned to songwriting in 2014, recording her debut album Songs for the Waiting produced by Matthew Odmark (Jars of Clay) at Gray Matters Studio in Nashville, TN in 2016. Songs for the Waiting released on April 7, 2017. Songs for the Waiting reached No.6 on the Billboard Mountain Heatseekers chart. Blair's second album Over Under fully releases October 30, 2020.
