= Butch Kinerney =

Butch Kinerney is Chief of Communications for the Federal Insurance and Mitigation Administration of the Federal Emergency Management Agency (FEMA) and an expert in risk and crisis communications. He served as acting press secretary for FEMA in 2005–2006, rising to the position immediately following landfall of Hurricane Katrina in 2005. During Katrina and the ongoing recovery in the Gulf Coast, he was quoted more than 30,000 times in the press, from Katrina's first landfall in Florida throughout the tumultuous fallout from FEMA's response efforts in Louisiana and Mississippi.

He is noted speaker on risk and crisis communications. In addition, Kinerney is a volunteer fire fighter with the Arcola-Pleasant Valley Volunteer Fire Department in Loudoun County, VA, and counsels incarcerated youths through Epiphany Ministry.

Prior to his appointment as acting press secretary, Kinerney was the public affairs liaison to FEMA's Mitigation Division, the National Flood Insurance Program and the U.S. Fire Administration. He joined FEMA in 2004, prior to four hurricanes striking Florida.

Before joining FEMA, Butch spent five years as a public affairs specialist at the U.S. Geological Survey in Reston, Virginia, where he worked directly with the USGS Water Resources Division and the USGS hazards program which included earthquakes, wildfires, volcanoes and landslides.

Kinerney worked as the Chief of Public Information for the Maryland Emergency Management Agency and as a Community Relations Officer for the Delaware Department of Natural Resources and Environmental Control. He was a newspaper and magazine reporter/writer/editor before beginning his government career.

A 1990 graduate of the University of Maryland, College Park, Kinerney has a degree in news-editorial journalism. He currently resides in Northern Virginia with his wife and three children.
