= Beverly Mock =

American geneticist

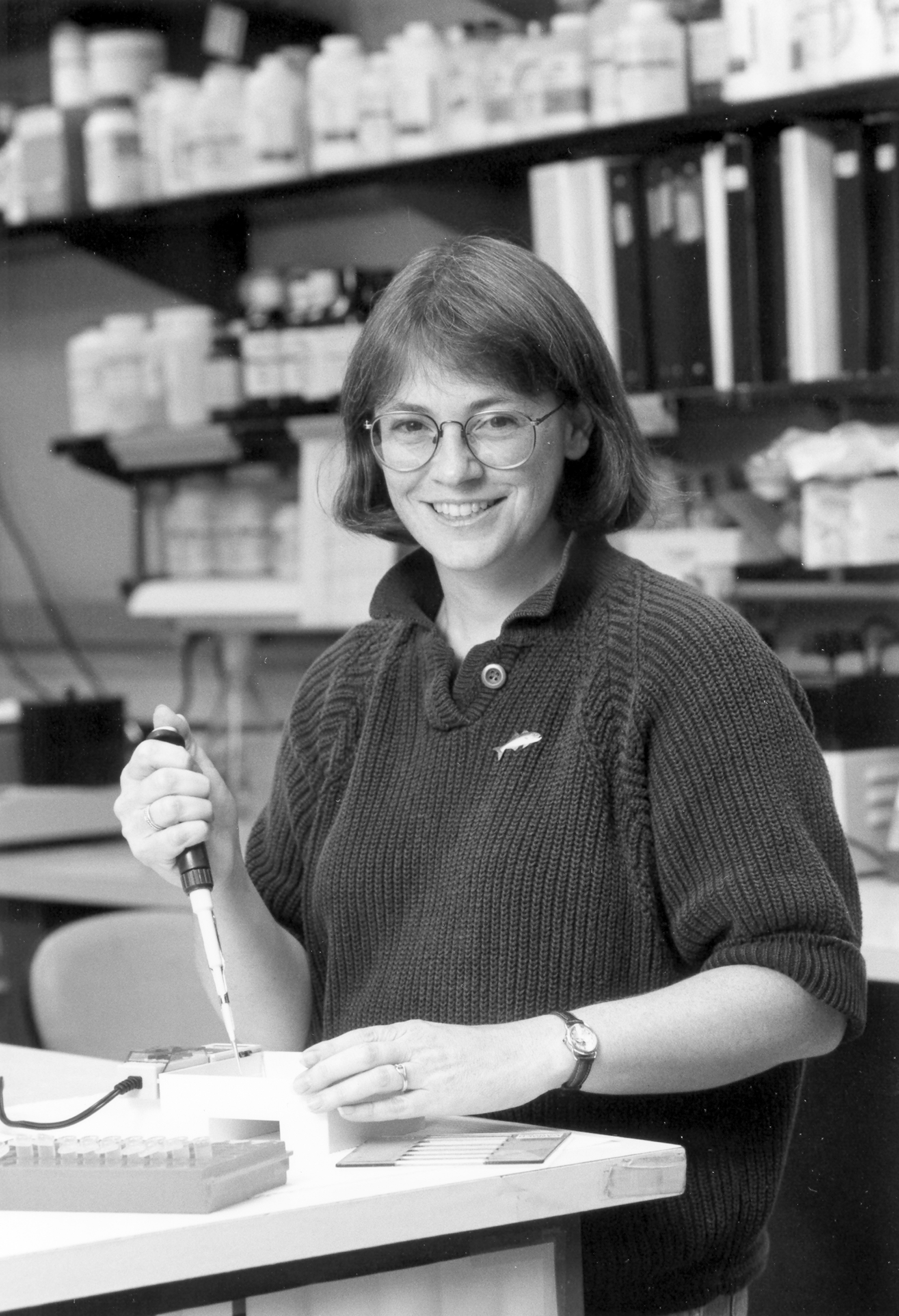
- Mock in 1995
- Education: University of Maryland, College Park
- Scientific career
- Fields: Genetics
- Workplaces: National Cancer Institute

Beverly Anne Mock is an American geneticist who is a deputy director of the National Cancer Institute's Center for Cancer Research.

== Life ==
Mock obtained a Ph.D. in zoology from the University of Maryland, College Park in 1983. Her dissertation was titled, The population biology of Trypanosoma diemyctyli. She continued her studies on the genetics of susceptibility to parasitic diseases in the department of immunology at the Walter Reed Army Institute of Research.

Since coming to the National Institutes of Health, she has focused her research on complex genetic traits associated with cancer initiation and progression in an effort to develop strategies for identifying and analyzing drug combinations to target susceptibility pathways. She serves as the head of several research programs which investigate molecular mechanisms involved in genetic and epigenetic regulation of gene expression, cell signaling, the cell cycle, and environmental interactions between tumor cells.

Mock is a deputy director of the National Cancer Institute's Center for Cancer Research, deputy chief of the NCI laboratory of cancer biology and genetics, and head of the cancer genetics section.

== Selected works ==
- Mock, Beverly A.; Nacy, C. A. (December 1988). "Hormonal modulation of sex differences in resistance to Leishmania major systemic infections". Infection and Immunity. 56 (12): 3316–3319. doi:10.1128/iai.56.12.3316-3319.1988. ISSN 0019-9567. PMC 259743. PMID 3182082.
- Hilbert, D M; Kopf, M; Mock, B A; Köhler, G; Rudikoff, S (July 1, 1995). "Interleukin 6 is essential for in vivo development of B lineage neoplasms". Journal of Experimental Medicine. 182 (1): 243–248. doi:10.1084/jem.182.1.243. PMC 2192088. PMID 7790819.
