= Wayson R. Jones =

American artist predominantly

- Occupation: Artist
- Known for: Abstract painting
- Website: www.waysonjones.com

Wayson R. Jones is an American artist predominantly known for his textured abstract paintings. He resides in Mount Rainier, Maryland, a suburb of Washington, D.C.

== Education ==
Jones is a 1980 graduate from the University of Maryland.

== Awards ==
Jones is a 2017 grant-award winner from the Prince George's County Arts and Humanities Council.

== Exhibitions ==
=== Solo shows ===
- 2013 Recent Paintings, Bloombars, Washington, D.C.
- 2014 Black President and Other, BlackRock Center for the Arts, Germantown, Maryland
- 2014 Moons in Mountains, Joe's Movement Emporium, Mount Rainier, Maryland
- 2015 Jewels Stone Tower Gallery, Glen Echo, Maryland
- 2015 Visages/Vignettes, Montpelier Arts Center, Laurel, Maryland
- 2016 In Black and White Arts, Harmony Hall, Fort Washington, Maryland
- 2016 Throw Your Hands Up, Unitarian Universalist Church of Arlington, Arlington, Virginia
- 2017 Memory, Mostly Self, NVCC Fischer Gallery, Alexandria, Virginia
- 2019 District of Columbia Art Center, Washington, DC

== Reviews ==
In 2016, The Baltimore Sun wrote that "Wayson R. Jones' "Black President" (2012), an abstract portrait on canvas incorporating powdered graphite, acrylic medium and gesso that seems to bristle with conflict, internal and external." Also in 2016, in a group show review, The Washington Post highlighted the fact that "One of the starkest and most striking contributions is Wayson R. Jones’s near-abstract “Giant Angry Stars,” rendered in grainy black-and-white."

In a 2017 review, The Washington Post art critic noted that the "Jones makes art that's raw and unexpected." In an interview in East City Art, the artist stated that he started "making visual art when I was 50, ten years ago, but I’ve been involved in the arts since I was a kid. I played music from grade school through college, where I also was in an improv dance company for a couple of years. I was in the DC downtown arts scene in the 80s and early 90s as part of an active Black LGBT arts scene that had national prominence, doing spoken word and music..."

In 2019, Jones started working in color again.
