= Joseph B. Bernstein =

- Citizenship: Israel
- Education: Massachusetts Institute of Technology (Ph.D. and M.S.); Union College (B.S.)
- Occupation: Professor
- Known for: Reliability of microelectronic devices, packaging, system reliability modeling, gate oxide integrity, radiation effects, Flash and DRAM reliability, laser programmable metal interconnect
- Scientific career
- Fields: Microelectronics, Semiconductor device reliability, Physics of failure
- Workplaces: Ariel University, Bar-Ilan University, Tel Aviv University, University of Maryland, MIT Lincoln Laboratory
- Thesis: Electrical characterization of polymeric insulation by electrically stimulated acoustic wave measurements (1990)

Joseph B. Bernstein is an Israeli professor of electrical and electronic engineering at the faculty of engineering, Ariel University. He is recognized for his research in microelectronic device reliability and the physics of failure, system-level reliability modeling, and failure mechanisms in advanced devices. Bernstein directs the Laboratory for Failure Analysis and Reliability of Electronic Systems at Ariel University and heads the university's VLSI program.

== Early life and education ==
Bernstein studied electrical engineering at Union College in Schenectady, New York, graduating summa cum laude in 1984. He later completed a master's degree in electrical engineering and a doctorate in electrical engineering and computer science at the Massachusetts Institute of Technology between 1986 and 1990. He is Jewish.

During his undergraduate studies, Bernstein developed an early specialization in semiconductor device physics, working on experimental projects involving MOS capacitors. This work contributed to his selection for a competitive summer research internship at Cornell University, where he conducted laboratory research related to microelectronic devices, further solidifying his interest in microelectronics and reliability engineering.

At MIT, Bernstein pursued advanced research in microelectronics within the Electrical Engineering and Computer Science (EECS) department. His doctoral research focused on charge trapping and reliability phenomena in insulating materials used in semiconductor devices, an area that later became central to his academic career.

== Academic career ==
After completing his doctorate, Bernstein joined the research staff at MIT Lincoln Laboratory, where he worked from 1990 to 1995. During this period, he also served as an adjunct professor at Boston University from 1991 to 1993.

While at MIT Lincoln Laboratory, Bernstein conducted research on wafer-scale integration and advanced interconnect technologies. During this period, he developed laser-based techniques for programmable metal interconnects used in circuit repair and redundancy, contributing to several patented inventions in microelectronics fabrication and reliability. These inventions later formed the basis of licensed technologies used in semiconductor manufacturing.

In 1995, he joined the University of Maryland, College Park, where he was appointed assistant professor in reliability, materials, and nuclear engineering (1995–2001) and later associate professor in mechanical engineering (2001–2008). He served as a visiting associate professor at Tel Aviv University between 2003 and 2005 and was awarded a Fulbright Senior Scholar appointment during that period.

From 2006 to 2012, Bernstein was professor of engineering at Bar-Ilan University. In 2012, he joined Ariel University.

== Research ==
Bernstein's research addresses semiconductor reliability and failure physics across a range of device technologies. His work includes studies of gate oxide breakdown, hot-carrier degradation, and electromigration in advanced CMOS technologies. He has also investigated reliability issues in Flash and DRAM memory devices as well as wide-bandgap semiconductor materials.

His contributions to physics-of-failure methodologies include the development of compact and system-level reliability models that integrate multiple failure mechanisms, enabling improved lifetime prediction for complex electronic systems. These models have been applied to microprocessors, memory technologies, power electronics, and aerospace systems.

In addition to device-level reliability, Bernstein has contributed to system-level reliability modeling, including applications in aerospace and defense electronics. He has also developed laser-programmable interconnect technologies for circuit repair and redundancy. He is listed as an inventor on multiple U.S. patents related to microelectronics reliability and circuit design.

Bernstein has also contributed extensively to reliability modeling frameworks used in industry and government reliability handbooks, including methodologies adopted by U.S. space and defense organizations. His research has been published in IEEE Transactions on Electron Devices, Microelectronics Reliability, and Applied Physics Letters, and he has been a frequent contributor to the IEEE International Reliability Physics Symposium (IRPS).

He has several patents in his name.

== Books ==
Bernstein has authored or co-authored several books and technical handbooks on electronics reliability, including:

- The Korean Electronics Industry (CRC Press, 1997)
- Microelectronics Reliability Modeling and Lifetime Evaluation Handbook (NASA JPL, 2007)
- Physics-of-Failure Based Handbook of Microelectronic Systems (RIAC, 2008)
- Reliability Prediction from Burn-In Data Fit to Reliability Models (Elsevier Academic Press, 2014)
- Reliability Prediction for Microelectronics (WILEY Semiconductors, 2024)

== Professional affiliations ==
At Ariel University, Bernstein directs the Reliable Integrated Electronics Laboratory. He also founded and advises the Israel Electronics Manufacturers Working Group on Reliability (ILTAM), established in 2005. He is a senior member of the Institute of Electrical and Electronics Engineers (IEEE).

He has also served as a reviewer and technical committee member for major IEEE conferences and journals in the fields of device reliability and microelectronics engineering.

== Awards ==
Bernstein has received several professional honors, including recognition as a Fulbright Senior Researcher and Lecturer (2004–2005), election as an IEEE Senior Member (2003), and selection as a NASA/ASEE Summer Faculty Research Fellow at the Jet Propulsion Laboratory (1998).
