= Sofia Merajver =

American-Argentine medical oncologist

- Born: 1953 (age 72–73); Argentina

Academic background
- Education: BA, MA, PhD, physics, 1979, University of Maryland, College Park; MD, 1987, Michigan Medicine
- Thesis: Phase transitions in biomembranes: a random walk model (1979)

Academic work
- Institutions: University of Michigan

Sofia Diana Merajver (born 1953) is an American-Argentine medical oncologist. She is the GreaterGood Breast Cancer Research Professor and director of the Breast and Ovarian Cancer Risk Evaluation Program at Michigan Medicine. In 2022, Merajver was elected a Fellow of the American Association for the Advancement of Science.

== Early life and education ==
Merajver was born in 1953 to a Jewish family in Argentina. She enrolled at the University of Buenos Aires to study mathematics and physics but eventually left her home country due to the Dirty War.

Upon leaving Argentina for the United States at the age of 19, Merajver enrolled at the University of Maryland, College Park (UMD). She completed her PhD in physics at UMD in 1979 and published her thesis Phase transitions in biomembranes: a random walk model. Following her PhD, Merajver accepted a post-doctoral fellowship in biological physics at the United States Naval Research Laboratory where she attempted to devise membranes to encapsulate hemoglobin protein so artificial blood could be produced for the military. Merajver then earned her medical degree in 1987 from Michigan Medicine and completed her residency and fellowship at the same institution.

== Career ==
Following her residency and fellowship, Merajver joined the faculty at the University of Michigan where she founded the Breast and Ovarian Cancer Risk Evaluation Program. She also became the director of the Breast and Ovarian Risk Evaluation Clinic at the University of Michigan Comprehensive Cancer Center. As an associate professor in 1999, she oversaw a research study that led to the identification of genes that may control the development of inflammatory breast cancer. She was also promoted to the rank of Full professor of Internal Medicine.

Upon accepting her new role, Merajver helped lead clinical and laboratory investigations of the drug tetrathiomolybdate, including a Phase II trial for advanced breast cancer patients. During the trial, Merajver discovered that the drug showed evidence of tumor stabilization in patients whose copper levels were reduced to one-fifth of their original levels for three months or more. Following this, Merajver found that the protein RhoC was a key driver of inflammatory breast cancer and early detection could prevent them from spreading. Her research team subsequently became the first to show that RhoC was also involved in breast cancer and could transform cells into cancerous ones with metastatic potential. Later, Merajver's research team used experimental data from the MAPK/ERK pathway to develop a new mathematical model for scientists to learn which cellular processes are key in many diseases.

As her tenure at UMich continued, Merajver continued to examine the impact of RhoC and found that when the gene interacted with the cell's machinery at a molecular level it regulates how it produces energy. Following this, Merajver was named the recipient of the 2016–17 Sarah Goddard Power Award as someone "who demonstrate scholarship, leadership and support of women faculty, staff and students." Merajver continued her drug research and developed a dual inhibitor technology for Triple-Negative Breast Cancer which alters the cellular localization of c-Strc/p38 kinase and decreases the accessibility of their regulatory domains.

As a result of her oncological research, Merajver was appointed the inaugural GreaterGood Breast Cancer Research Professor in Spring 2021. The following year, she was elected a Fellow of the American Association for the Advancement of Science for "landmark studies of mechanisms, novel therapies and biomarkers, and management of patients with inflammatory breast cancers and women at increased risk for cancers in the United States and Africa."

== Personal life ==
In 2017, Merajver was diagnosed with breast cancer but has since entered remission.
