= 1935 All-Southern Conference football team =

The 1935 All-Southern Conference football team consists of American football players chosen by the Associated Press (AP) and United Press (UP) for the All-Southern Conference football team for the 1935 college football season.

== All-Southern Conference selections ==
=== Quarterbacks ===
- Ace Parker, Duke (AP-1)
- Herman Snyder, North Carolina (AP-2)
- Harry Montgomery, North Carolina State (AP-3)

=== Halfbacks ===
- Don Jackson, North Carolina (AP-1)
- Bill Guckeyson, Maryland (AP-1)
- Jule Ward, Duke (AP-2)
- Ed Berlinski, North Carolina State (AP-2)
- Billy Roberson, VMI (AP-3)
- Joe Arnold, Washington & Lee (AP-3)

=== Fullbacks ===
- Herman Dickerson, Virginia Polytechnic (AP-1)
- Jim Hutchins, North Carolina (AP-2)
- Jack Alexander, Duke (AP-3)

=== Ends ===
- Dick Buck, North Carolina (AP-1)
- John Leys, Virginia (AP-1)
- Bill Ellis, Washington & Lee (AP-2)
- Ed West, Duke (AP-2)
- Andy Bershak, North Carolina (AP-3)
- John Trimpey, North Carolina (AP-3)
- Mac Cara, North Carolina State (AP-3)

=== Tackles ===
- Hugo Bonino, Washington & Lee (AP-1)
- Gus Durner, Duke (AP-1)
- Tom Evins, North Carolina (AP-2)
- Tom Brown, Clemson (AP-2)
- Venice Farar, North Carolina State (AP-3)
- Joe Cardwell, Duke (AP-3)

=== Guards ===
- Jim Johnston, Duke (AP-1)
- Jim Farley, VMI (AP-1)
- Clarence Inabinet, Clemson (AP-2)
- Barnes Worth, North Carolina State (AP-2)
- Paul Gaffney, South Carolina (AP-3)
- Ed Minion, Maryland (AP-3)

=== Centers ===
- Steve Sabol, North Carolina State (AP-1)
- Babe Daniel, North Carolina (AP-2)
- Jack Hennemier, Duke (AP-3)

== Key ==
AP = Associated Press

UP = United Press

== See also ==
- 1935 College Football All-America Team
