= University of Maryland Athletic Hall of Fame =

Honor awarded to University of Maryland athletes and coaches

The University of Maryland Athletic Hall of Fame was established in 1982 by the M Club Foundation to honor student-athletes, coaches, and administrators who made significant contributions to athletics at the University of Maryland. The Hall of Fame was established by athletic director Dick Dull, Jack Faber, Tom Fields, Al Heagy, Jim Kehoe, Art Kramer and Jack Scarbath, who determined the selection criteria and the organization's by-laws. The criteria and by-laws were later approved by an Election Committee of coaches and letter winners appointed by Dick Dull.

== Criteria ==
The Election Committee consists of the current athletic director, coaches, alumni, and athletic department staff. The committee meets each year in May to consider nominations. Anyone is eligible to nominate candidates for induction.

- Letter winners must be out of school for at least ten years
- Athletic department staff must have earned a letter or served for at least 15 years
- Record of "superior athletic accomplishments", which may include those achieved after leaving the university
- Selection is based upon athletic merit alone
- Candidate must be of "good character and reputation"
- Candidates who have achieved induction into a national hall of fame merit automatic induction, provided they meet the other criteria

== Inductees ==
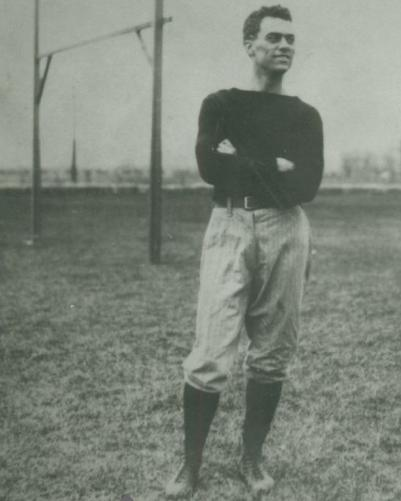
Curley Byrd (inducted 1982) was a star athlete at Maryland and later served as the university's football coach, athletic director, and university president.

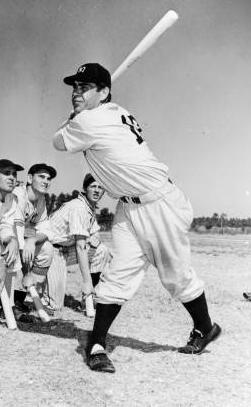
Charles E. Keller (inducted 1982) played for the New York Yankees from 1939 to 1949.

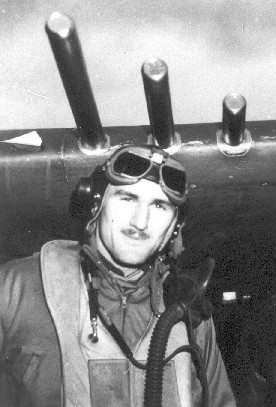
Bill Guckeyson (inducted 1982) was killed in action as a fighter pilot over Europe in World War II.

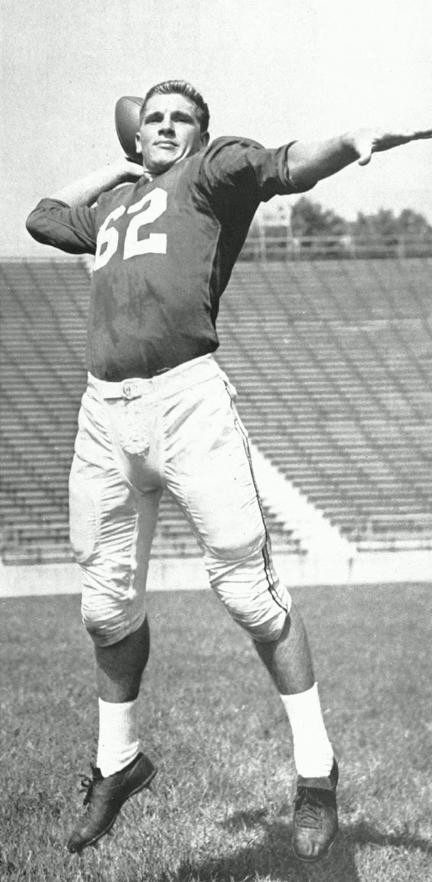
Quarterback Jack Scarbath (inducted 1984) finished second in the 1952 Heisman Trophy voting.

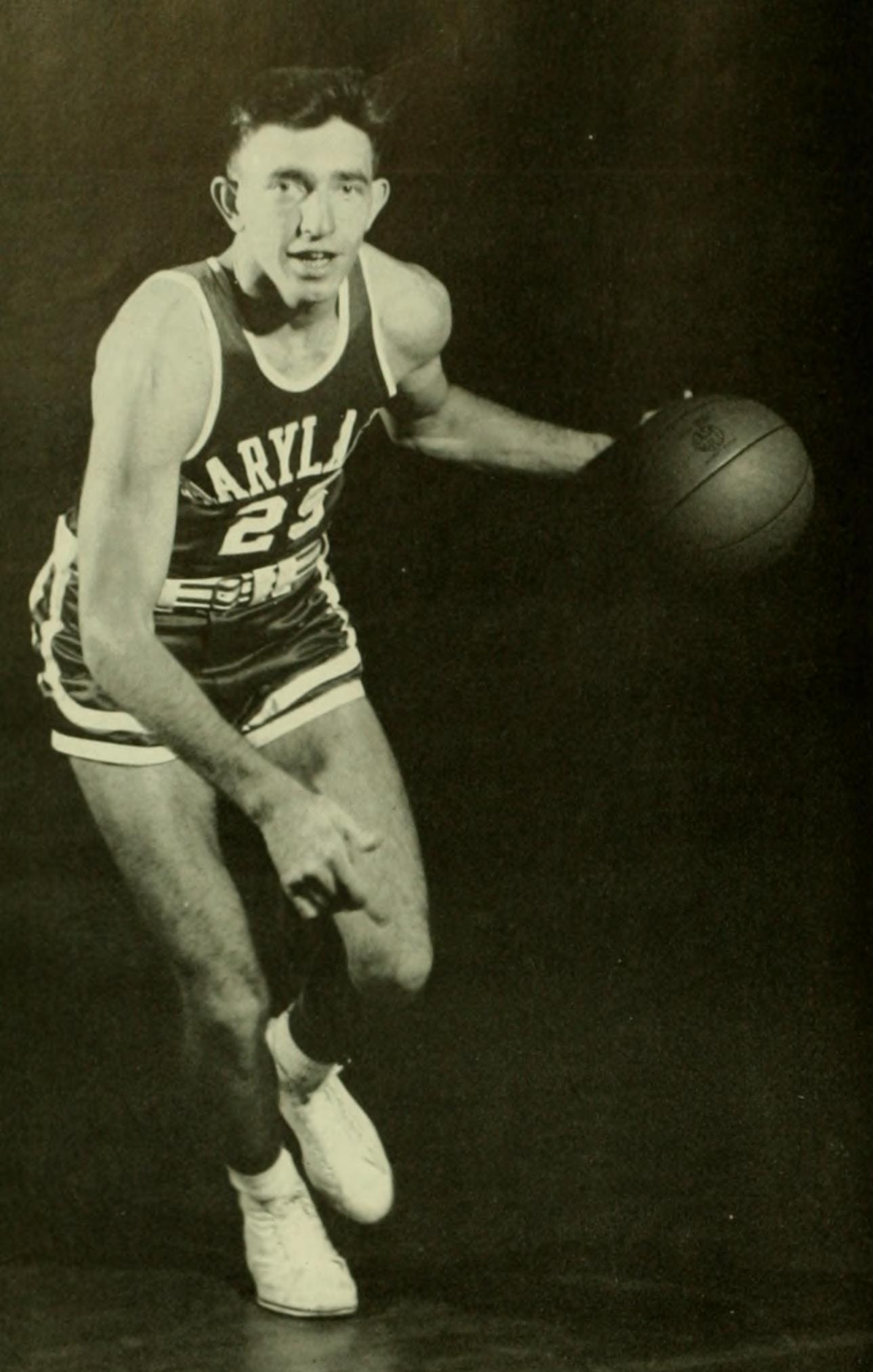
Gene Shue (inducted 1991) was named to the NBA All-Star team in five consecutive years.

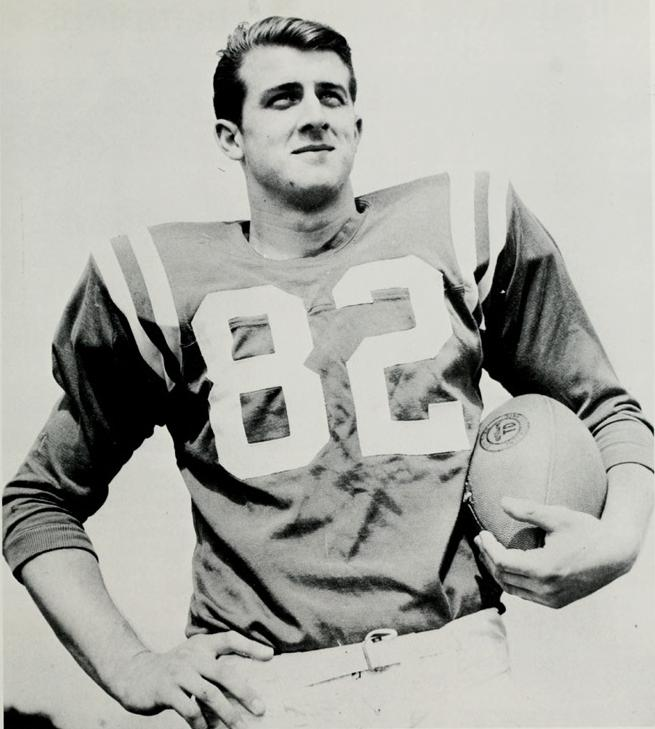
Gary Collins (inducted 1997) was a consensus All-American and finished eighth in the Heisman voting in 1961.

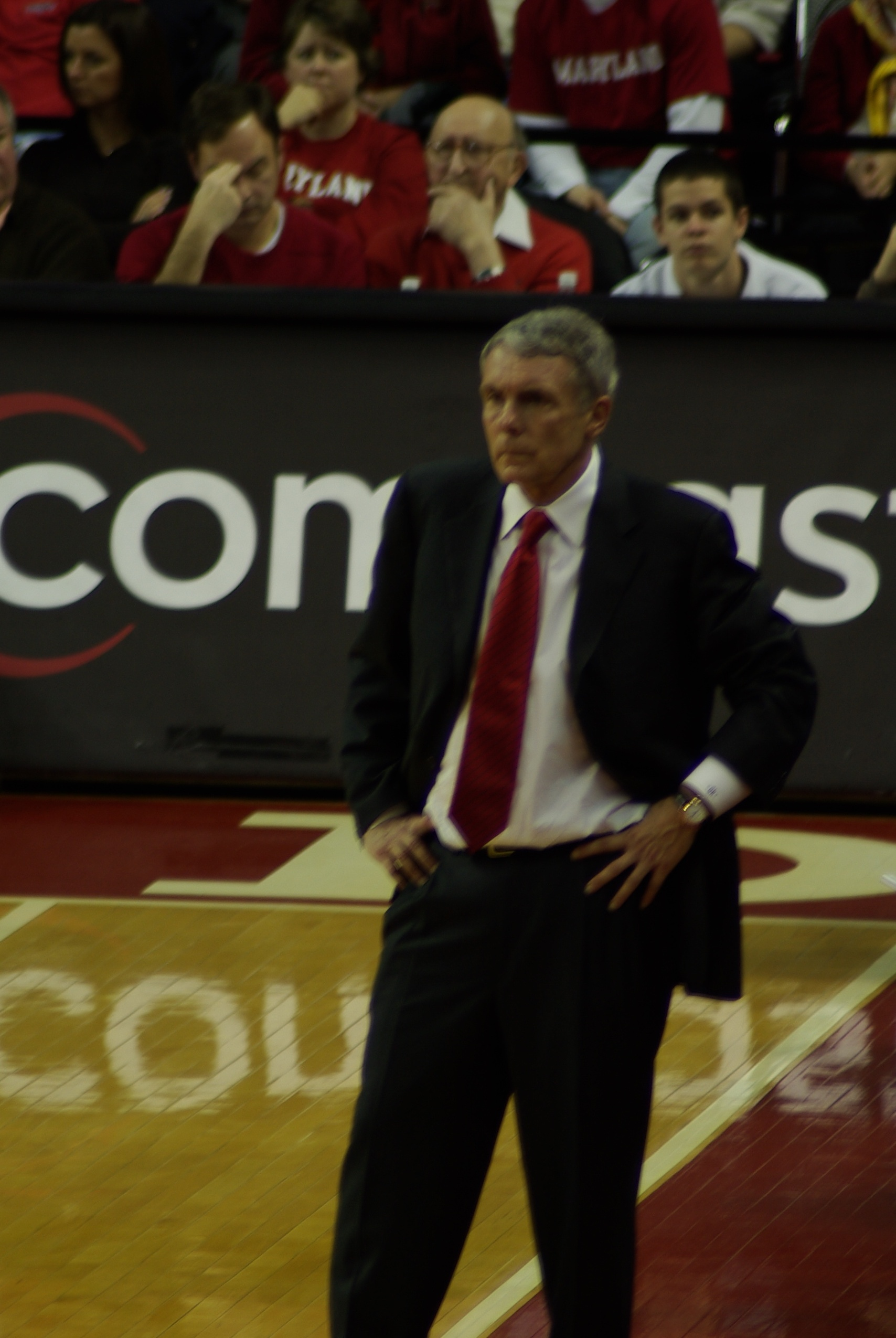
Gary Williams (inducted 1999) led the men's basketball team to two Final Fours, including the 2002 national championship.

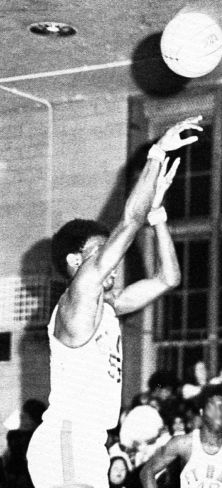
Albert King (inducted 2002) was the 1980 ACC Men's Basketball Player of the Year.

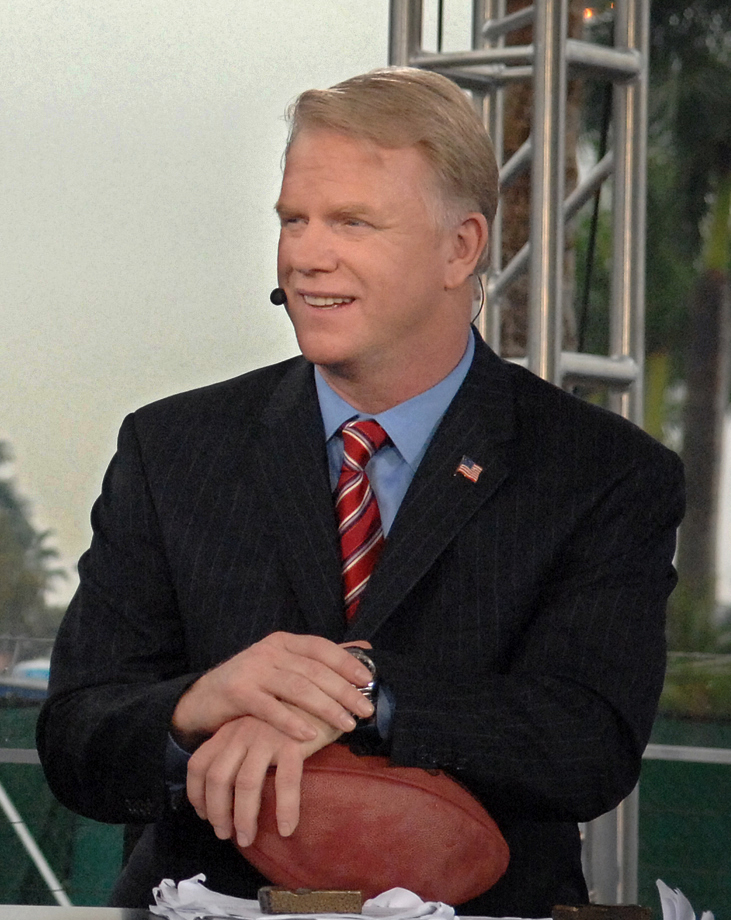
Boomer Esiason (inducted 2003) set numerous school football records, was awarded the NFL MVP Award, and led the Cincinnati Bengals to Super Bowl XXIII.

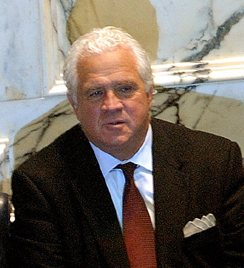
Thomas V. Miller (inducted 2008), president of the Maryland Senate, was inducted for "meritorious service".

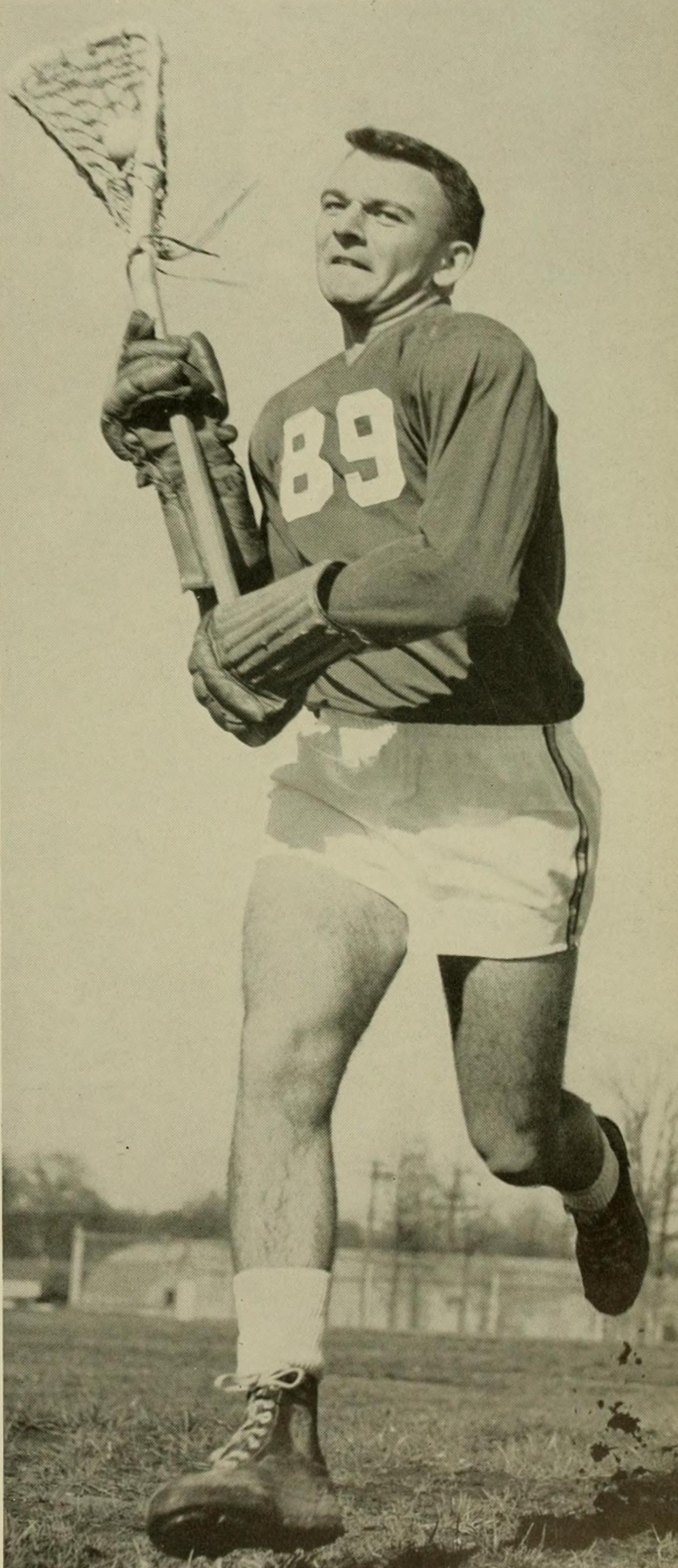
Rennie Smith (inducted 2009) co-captained the 1955 national championship lacrosse team.

Year	Name	Sport or capacity	Graduated
1982	Bosey Berger	Football, basketball, baseball	1932
1982	Joseph C. Burger	Football, basketball, lacrosse	1925
1982	Curley Byrd	Football, track, baseball, baseball coach, football coach	1908
1982	Arthur E. Cook	Rifle	Attended
1982	Geary F. Eppley	Football, track, track coach, athletic director	1921
1982	Bill Guckeyson	Football, basketball, track, baseball	1936
1982	Charles E. Keller	Basketball, baseball	1937
1982	Fred Linkous	Football, basketball, lacrosse	1928
1982	Charles L. Mackert	Football, assistant coach	1921
1982	Jim Meade	Football, lacrosse	1939
1982	Julius J. Radice	Football, basketball, baseball	1930
1982	Burton Shipley	Football, basketball, baseball, basketball coach, baseball coach	1914
1982	Bill Supplee	Football, basketball, track	1926
1983	George V. Chalmers	Football, basketball, baseball	1932
1983	William W. Evans	Football, basketball, lacrosse	1930
1983	Jack Faber	Basketball, lacrosse, football coach, lacrosse coach	1926
1983	Norwood Sothoron	Football, basketball, baseball, lacrosse	1935
1984	Caleb Bailey	Football, baseball	1922
1984	Brooke Brewer	Football, track	1922
1984	John F. Christhilf	Lacrosse	1936
1984	William W. Cobey	Athletic director	1930
1984	Joseph H. Deckman	Lacrosse, football	1931
1984	Charles F. Ellinger	Football, lacrosse	1937
1984	Al Heagy	Football, basketball, lacrosse, lacrosse coach	1930
1984	Frederick M. Hewitt	Football, lacrosse	1936
1984	John F. Kelly	Lacrosse	1937
1984	Ivan M. Marty	Lacrosse	1924
1984	William G. Morris	Football, baseball	1913
1984	John C. Norris	Football, basketball, lacrosse	1932
1984	Edwin E. Powell	Lacrosse	1913
1984	Gordon S. Pugh	Lacrosse	1932
1984	Jack Scarbath	Football, lacrosse	1952
1984	Gerald Snyder	Football, lacrosse	1929
1984	Jim Tatum	Football coach	Non-alumnus
1984	R. V. Truitt	Lacrosse, lacrosse coach	1914
1984	Bob Ward	Football, football coach	1952
1984	Albert W. Woods	Football, football coach	1933
1985	Frank H. Cronin	Track, boxing, coach	1939
1985	John F. Hough	Football, lacrosse	1925
1985	Thomas J. McQuade	Football, lacrosse	1924
1985	Pershing L. Mondorff	Football, baseball, basketball, soccer	1941
1985	Kenneth T. Knode	Football, baseball	1916
1985	Harry Edwin Semler	Football, baseball	1922
1986	Ben Alperstein	Boxing	1936
1986	Francis A. Buscher	Football, basketball, baseball	1934
1986	James R. Kappler	Lacrosse	1957
1986	Jim Kehoe	Track coach, athletic director	1940
1986	Jessee J. Krajovic	Football, track	1931
1986	John W. Zane	Sports information director	1960
1987	Thomas M. Fields	Track	1941
1987	William E. Krouse	Football, wrestling, coach	1941
1987	Tommy Mont	Football, basketball, lacrosse, football coach	1947
1987	George W. Knepley	Basketball, baseball	1939
1987	Howard V. Keene	Baseball	1921
1987	Charles E. Wicker	Lacrosse, soccer	1956
1988	Clayton A. Beardmore	Lacrosse, lacrosse coach	1962
1988	Bernie Faloney	Football, baseball	1953
1988	John D. Gilmore	Football, track, basketball, boxing	1943
1988	Bud Millikan	Basketball coach	Non-alumnus
1988	Raymond J. Poppelman	Football, lacrosse	1933
1988	Doyle P. Royal	Tennis, soccer, tennis coach, soccer coach	1943
1988	Victor G. Willis	Football, basketball, baseball	1937
1989	William R. Campbell	Swimming coach	Non-alumnus
1989	Ernest Fischer	Wrestling	1954
1989	James H. Keating	Lacrosse	1957
1989	Edward Ronkin	Basketball	1932
1989	John W. Simmons	Lacrosse	1956
1990	Hotsy Alperstein	Boxing	1943
1990	Ernest J. Betz	Lacrosse	1958
1990	John C. Heim	Lacrosse	1967
1990	Charles A. May	Basketball, football, lacrosse	1931
1990	Edward M. Minion	Football, lacrosse	1938
1990	Milton M. Mulitz	Basketball, lacrosse	1940
1990	Myron B. Stevens	Baseball, basketball, football	1927
1991	John B. Flynn	Basketball, baseball	1946
1991	Stan Jones	Football	1953
1991	Alan Lowe	Lacrosse	1967
1991	Richard M. Moran	Lacrosse	1960
1991	Edward Rieder	Boxing, soccer	1949
1991	Gene Shue	Basketball	1949
1991	Robert Smith	Football, baseball	1942
1992	Dick Modzelewski	Football	1953
1992	Vince Palumbo	Boxing	1955
1992	James H. Belt	Soccer	1951
1992	G. Irene Knox	Rifle	1934
1992	Ray Krouse	Football	1950
1994	Chet Hanulak	Football	1954
1994	William Hubbell	Lacrosse	1952
1994	Mike Sandusky	Football	1957
1994	Alfred Wyre	Head trainer	1947?
1994	Robert James	Athletic director	1947
1995	Tom Brown	Football, baseball	1962
1995	Tom McMillen	Basketball	1974
1995	Sue Tyler	Women's lacrosse coach	Non-alumna
1995	Frank Urso	Lacrosse	1974
1995	Randy White	Football	1974
1995	Earl Widmyer	Track, football	1935
1996	Frank Costello	Track, track coach	1968
1996	John Lucas	Basketball, tennis	1974
1996	Bob Pellegrini	Football	1956
1996	Margaret Mitchell	Rifle	1930
1997	Michael Cole	Track	1966
1997	Gary Collins	Football	1961
1997	Len Elmore	Basketball	1974
1997	Robert Kopnisky	Wrestling	1965
1997	Douglas Schreiber	Lacrosse	1973
1998	John Belitza	Track	1968
1998	Tara Heiss	Basketball	1978
1998	Gobel Kline	Wrestling	1969
1998	Douglas Radebaugh	Lacrosse	1975
1998	Renaldo Nehemiah	Track	1981
1998	Stan Lavine	Football, team doctor	1950
1999	Richard Corrigan	Lacrosse	1958
1999	Richard Drescher	Basketball, track	1970
1999	Garry Garber	Boxing	1950
1999	Paula Girven-Pittman	Track	1980
1999	Gary Williams	Basketball, basketball coach	1968
2000	John Baker	Track	1971
2000	Vicky Bullett	Basketball	1989
2000	Jerry Claiborne	Football coach	Non-alumnus
2000	Mike Farrell	Lacrosse	1976
2000	Kevin Glover	Football	1985
2000	Bill Larash	Lacrosse	1952
2000	Dick Shiner	Football	1963
2000	Roy Skinner	Lacrosse, soccer	1958
2001	Deane Beman	Golf	1960
2001	Nick Kovalakides	Track	1961
2001	Andy McDonald	Soccer, baseball	1958
2001	Alice Orton	Rifle	1930
2001	Sam Silber	Lacrosse	1935
2001	Kim Turner	Field hockey	1988
2001	Buck Williams	Basketball	1981
2002	Lefty Driesell	Basketball coach	Non-alumnus
2002	Dick Edell	Lacrosse coach	Non-alumnus
2002	Gene Hiser	Baseball	1971
2002	Albert King	Basketball	1981
2002	Ed Modzelewski	Football	1951
2002	Jasmina Perazic	Basketball	1983
2003	Ray Altman	Lacrosse	1963
2003	Boomer Esiason	Football	1983
2003	Chris Stauffer	Track	1963
2003	Rosalind Sheppard	Track	1989
2003	Chris Weller	Women's basketball coach	1966
2003	Tom Young	Basketball	1958
2004	Elton Jackson	Baseball coach	Non-alumnus
2004	Laura LeMire	Field hockey, lacrosse	1981
2004	J. D. Maarleveld	Football	1985
2004	Dorothy McKnight	Women's basketball coach	?
2004	Gregory Robertson	Track	1980
2004	Bill Walker	Football, baseball	1954
2005	Joe F. Blair	Sports information director	Non-alumnus
2005	Tom Cosgrove	Football	1952
2005	Paul McNeil	Wrestling	1941
2005	Deanna Tate	Women's basketball	1989
2005	Jessica Wilk	Field hockey, lacrosse	1990
2005	Walt Williams	Basketball	1991
2006	Lisa Buente	Field Hockey	1990
2006	Howie Dare	Baseball, football	1957
2006	Nick Davis	Basketball	1958
2006	Christy Winters	Basketball	1990
2006	Mike Thearle	Lacrosse	1973
2006	Deborah Yow	Athletic director	Non-alumna
2007	Phil Denkevitz	Swimming	1965
2007	Fred Funk	Golf	1980
2007	Jack Heise	Meritorious service	1947
2007	Bob Kessler	Basketball	1956
2007	John McHugh	Wrestling coach	1959
2007	Carin Peterson	Field hockey, women's lacrosse	1988
2007	Buddy Williamson	Track and field	1971
2008	Dave Diehl	Administrator	1963
2008	Kelly Amonte Hiller	Women's lacrosse	1996
2008	Kim Chorosiewski	Field hockey, women's lacrosse	1987
2008	Thomas V. Miller	Meritorious service	1964
2008	Keith Booth	Basketball	1997
2008	Darryl Hill	Football	1964
2008	Brian Dougherty	Lacrosse	1996
2009	Desmond Armstrong	Soccer	1984
2009	Dale Castro	Football	1979
2009	Conrad Hemphill	Baseball	1954
2009	Johnny Holliday	Broadcaster	Non-alumnus
2009	Kate Kauffman-Beach	Field hockey	1996
2009	Missy Meharg	Field hockey coach	Non-alumna
2009	Rennie Smith	Lacrosse	1955
2010	Leo Cullen	Soccer	1998
2010	Christine DeBow	Field hockey	1997
2010	Laura Harmon	Women's lacrosse, field hockey	1995
2010	Marchelle Payne-Gassaway	Women's track and field	1994
2010	Eric Wilson	Football	1985
2010	Peter Worstell	Lacrosse	1981
2012	Jen Adams	Women's lacrosse	2001
2012	Tom Bradley	Baseball	1972
2012	Juan Dixon	Basketball	2002
2012	Sarah Forbes	Women's lacrosse	1997
2012	Leonard Rodman	Meritorious service	1943
2012	Carla Taglientel	Field hockey	2001
2012	Cindy Timchal	Women's lacrosse coach	Non-alumna
2012	Paul Vellano	Football	1973
2014	Len Bias	Basketball	1986
2014	Bob Boneillo	Lacrosse	1980
2014	Edward Cooke	Track & Field, football	1959
2014	Maureen Scott Dupcak	Field hockey, women's lacrosse	1994
2014	Alex Kahoe	Women's lacrosse	2000
2014	Debbie Lytle	Women's basketball	1983
2014	Sandy Worth	Athletic trainer	1973
2014	Charlie Wysocki	Football	1982
2016	Al Bunge	Basketball	1960
2016	Curt Callahan	Wrestler, coach	1970
2016	Bill "Spider" Fry	Administrator	1951
2016	E. J. Henderson	Football	2002
2016	Robert Ott	Lacrosse	1979
2016	Marcia Richardson	Basketball	1984
2016	Kay Ruffino Ward	Lacrosse, Field hockey	1985
2016	Kelly Shipman	Softball	1999
2016	Ron Squiers	Diving	1964
2016	Martia Walton	Track & field	1983
2018	Adrian Branch	Basketball	1985
2018	Gilian Cote Cook	Gymnastics	2002
2018	Jason Garey	Soccer	2005
2018	LaMont Jordan	Football	2000
2018	Eden Kroeger Burks	Volleyball	1997
2018	Howard Labow	Fencing	1976
2018	Cathy Reese	Lacrosse player, coach	1998
2018	Karen Trudel Martellucci	Field hockey, lacrosse	1985
2018	Joe Walters	Lacrosse	2006
2021	Rick Badanjek	Football	1985
2021	Steve Blake	Basketball	2003
2021	Sasho Cirovski	Soccer coach	Non-alumna
2021	Maurice Edu	Soccer	2006
2021	Paula Infante	Field hockey	2006
2021	D'Qwell Jackson	Football	2005
2021	Crystal Langhorne	Basketball	2008
2021	Keli Smith Puzo	Field hockey	2001
2021	Erin Taylor Blount	Soccer	1997
2022	Dominic Berger	Track & field	2007
2022	Vernon Davis	Football	2007
2022	Bob Grossman	Baseball	1972
2022	Caitlyn McFadden Phipps	Lacrosse	2010
2022	Sascha Newmarch	Lacrosse	1998
2022	Katie O'Donnell Bam	Field hockey	2010
2022	Hudson Taylor	Wrestling	2010
2022	Kristi Toliver	Basketball	2009
2022	Taylor Twellman	Soccer	1999
2022	Greivis Vasquez	Basketball	2010
2024	Lonny Baxter	Basketball	2002
2024	Patty Corson Robbins	Swimming	1987
2024	Jill Fisher-Galli	Gymnastics	2001
2024	Patrick Mullins	Soccer	2013
2024	Katie Schwarzmann	Lacrosse	2013
2024	Alyssa Thomas	Basketball	2014
2024	Autumn Welsh Kelly	Field hockey	2002
2024	Lee Zink	Lacrosse	2004
2026	Marissa Coleman	Basketball	2009
2026	Taylor Cummings	Lacrosse	2016
2026	Brenda Frese	Basketball coach	Non-alumna
2026	Michael Howley	Lacrosse	2003
2026	Dennis Ivory	Track & field	1979
2026	Thea LaFond	Track & field	2015
2026	Shawne Merriman	Football	2005
2026	Joe Smith	Basketball	1996
2026	Graham Zusi	Soccer	2009
