= Dorothy McKnight =

American female sports coach and administrator

Dorothy "Dottie" B. McKnight worked as the executive director of the United States Women's Lacrosse Association and the National Association for Girls and Women in Sports, a university professor, a varsity coach, and an advocate for sex equity in athletics.

== Early life and education ==
McKnight grew up around Prospect Park, Pennsylvania, where she attended Prospect Park High School and graduated in 1953. She earned her bachelor's degree from Ursinus College and her master's degree from Temple University. McKnight did post-graduate work at the University of Maryland.

== Career ==
McKnight began her career as a field hockey, basketball, and softball coach at Interboro High School. She then moved to Michigan State University as a field hockey and lacrosse coach. She then moved to the University of Maryland as a field hockey and basketball coach.

At the University of Maryland, McKnight became an assistant professor in physical education. She served as the coordinator of women's athletics from 1971 to 1976. As the coordinator, McKnight supervised seven coaches in eight different sports. She was a coach at the university from 1964 until 1976.

McKnight was the first varsity women's basketball coach at the University of Maryland in 1971. She coached the team to their first state championship in the 1972-1973 season, defeating Morgan State University in the championship game. McKnight also coached the first women's basketball game televised nationally in 1975. Athletic director at the time Jim Kehoe secured a deal to televise the men's basketball team on the condition that they would televise one women's game. The game was broadcast to 70% of the country by the Mizlou Television Network. The team lost the televised game against Immaculata University at Cole Field House. McKnight held the position of varsity coach from 1971 to 1975. During her four years coaching, McKnight's team won 44 games and only lost 17 games. Chris Weller assumed the role after McKnight left.

After leaving the University of Maryland, McKnight worked at Athletic and Sport Consultants, Inc. for twenty years. She was the president and the managing owner. She was also the executive directors of the Educational Sport Institute.

McKnight later became the executive director of the United States Women's Lacrosse Association. She began her role on July 27, 1996 and continued in the role until 1998. McKnight also held the role of Executive Director for the National Association for Girls and Women in Sports (NAGWS).

== Awards and recognition ==
McKnight was awarded with the Presidential Award from NAGWS. In 2004, she was inducted into the University of Maryland Athletics Hall of Fame for her work in both administration and coaching.

McKnight is also known for her work for sex equity in sports and Title IX.

== Written works ==
- McKnight, Dorothy (1997-01-09). "Sports Aim of Schools Should Divide Groupings". The Washington Post.
- McKnight, D., & Hult, J. (1974). "Competitive athletics for girls—we must act." Journal of Health, Physical Education, Recreation, 45(6), 45–46. https://doi.org/10.1080/00221473.1974.10614194
- American Alliance for Health, Physical Education, Recreation and Dance, Barry, P., McKnight, D., American Alliance for Health, Physical Education, Recreation, and Dance., & National Association for Girls & Women in Sport. (1994). Gender equity in athletics: A self-study model. Millersville, Md: Recorded Resources Corp. http://www.worldcat.org/oclc/34729972
- McKnight, D., & American Alliance for Health, Physical Education, Recreation, and Dance. (1982). Effective teaching. Van Nuys, Calif: On-the-Spot Duplicators. http://www.worldcat.org/oclc/8955524
