= Julius J. Radice =

American physician and athlete (1908–1966)

Dr. Julius John Radice (1908 – 1966) was an American physician and athlete. He played college football, basketball, and baseball at the University of Maryland. Radice was inducted into the University of Maryland Athletic Hall of Fame in 1982.

== Biography ==
Radice was born in 1908 in Washington, D.C., and attended the University of Maryland, where he played as a second and first baseman on the baseball team, and as a fullback and halfback on the football team. Radice graduated from the University of Maryland with an A.B. degree in 1930. He earned a medical degree from the George Washington University Medical School in 1935. Radice was a member of Sigma Nu.

During his time at Maryland, Radice earned four letters in baseball, three in football, and one in basketball. In the 1928 basketball game against Kentucky, the "individual brilliance" of reserves Radice and Thurston Dean helped Maryland to a 37–7 victory over, in which the opponent was held to a single field goal. Radice scored a game-high of 10 points. Two seasons later, Radice again starred against the Wildcats in a 26–21 loss. Atlanta sportswriter Morgan Blake wrote, "the Maryland Old Liners ... had a fine sharpshooter, named Berger, and the slickest passing gentleman we have seen in may days in a heavy-set chap named Radice. Mr. Radice was somewhat of a magician. He would look one way and pass another. And his passes were like Dazzy Vance's speed ball."

For his style of play on the gridiron, Radice was called a "heavy plunging back" and a "clever defensive full". In the 1929 game against Yale, Radice and George Madigan, "a pair of burly defense men, did most Maryland's tackling in the first half", which The New York Times credited with keeping the Eli's lead to a surmountable 13–0. The Old Liners tied the score in the second half behind George V. Chalmers passes to Bosey Berger and secured a 13–13 upset against the period powerhouse. After the season, Radice was invited to play in the New Year's Day Southern Conference all-star game at Grant Field in Atlanta.

He was inducted into the University of Maryland Athletic Hall of Fame in 1982. His son, Peter Radice, played football at Yale in 1967.
