= Geary Eppley =

American academic and sports coach (1895-1978)

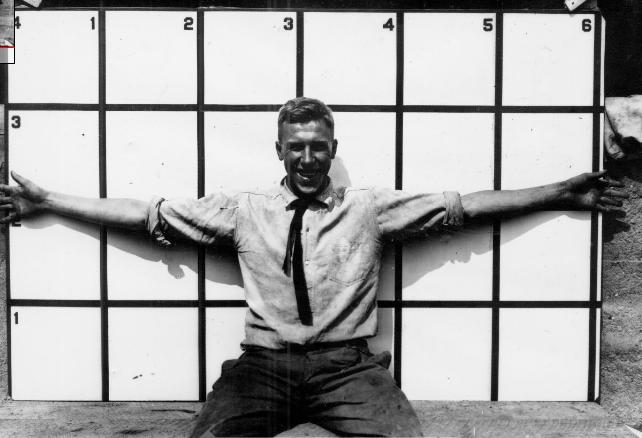
Eppley has his "wingspan" measured at Maryland State College in 1917.

Geary Francis "Swede" Eppley (December 30, 1895 – June 10, 1978) was an American university administrator, professor, agronomist, military officer, athlete, and track and field coach. He served as the University of Maryland athletic director from 1937 to 1947, during which time the school's athletic teams won seven national championships. Eppley worked in various capacities for Prince George's County and for private charities. He served in the United States Army during the First and Second World Wars.

== Early life and education ==
Eppley was born in 1895 in Washington, D.C. In 1914, he enrolled at the Maryland State College of Agriculture (now known as the University of Maryland), but put his education on hold to serve in the First World War. Eppley served as a second lieutenant in the 2nd Cavalry Regiment from March 11, 1918, to July 3, 1919. After the war, he returned to Maryland State, and earned letters in track and football in 1919 and 1920. He played on the football team as an end. In track, he set the Southern Intercollegiate Athletic Conference pole vault record, and in football, he was named a second-team all-conference end. He graduated with a bachelor of science degree in agriculture in 1920. He was a member of the Phi Kappa Phi, Omicron Delta Kappa, Pi Delta Epsilon, and Phi Eta Sigma honor societies, as well as the Scabbard and Blade and the Pershing Rifles.

== Professional career ==
Eppley joined the faculty as an assistant professor of agronomy in 1922, and in 1926, he earned a master of arts degree from what was by then known as the University of Maryland. He became the Maryland track coach during the 1930s, and his teams won two national championships. Jim Kehoe, who was on one of Eppley's track teams and himself later became track coach and athletic director, said, "I thought he was a really good coach ... He was very aggressive, very well informed."

He was assigned as the university's dean of men in 1936. The following year, Eppley became the athletic director and served in that capacity until 1947; during his tenure, Maryland won one football and six lacrosse national championships. He was a staunch supporter of athletics at Maryland, and routinely sat in the student section at the university's games.

In 1941, Eppley was activated from the Army Reserve at the rank of colonel, and was assigned to the office of the Army Chief of Staff. After the conclusion of the Second World War, university president Harry C. Byrd urgently requested Eppley's return as dean in 1945, saying, "You are absolutely essential to the successful operation of the university and if the university is an essential unit in our state and national existence, then it is certainly essential that you return to us." The school was experiencing a large influx in students as discharged veterans pursued their education under the G.I. Bill, and it strained the university's logistics. The enrollment of many wounded veterans increased the need for handicapped access, and the sheer number of students meant dining facilities required waits of up to an hour. Also, the disproportionate number of male students to females created disciplinary problems. In 1947, Eppley wrote to the assistant dean of women in the defense of some fraternity brothers who had broken into a sorority, but conceded that "the drinking problem on the university campus is a little worse than usual due to the aftermath of the war."

Eppley served terms as the vice president of the Southern Conference in the 1940s, and as its president in 1949. During the late 1940s and early 1950s, college athletics were marred by several scandals across the nation, and there were allegations of its overemphasis at universities. When the Southern Conference placed a ban on postseason bowl games, Eppley said, "As a member of the faculty, I am not over [sic] enthusiastic about bowls, but ... any over-emphasis is caused by the great desire of the American people to win." Maryland ignored the ban to participate in the 1952 Sugar Bowl, and was sanctioned by the conference. The incident proved a major catalyst for the formation of the Atlantic Coast Conference (ACC) in 1953. Eppley later served as the president of the ACC.

From 1946 to 1958, he was the university's director of student welfare, and in 1964, he was named a dean emeritus. In a controversial episode in 1953, Eppley confiscated thousands of copies of The Diamondback student paper because of an exposé on living conditions in the female dormitories. Eppley played a pivotal role in the founding of the university's student union and its chapel.

Eppley also served in numerous capacities for Prince George's County government and non-governmental organizations. He was the Prince George's County Boy's Club director, master of the county grange, a county Welfare Board member, and the county Community Chest budget chairman.

== Personal life ==
He married Elizabeth Flenner in 1925, and together, they had two daughters, Elizabeth and Frances, and one son, Geary W. Eppley. Geary F. Eppley was the honorary president of the Prince George's County Alumni Association of the University of Maryland, an American Cancer Society board member, a member of the Masons, the College Park Rotary Club, the Brotherhood of Saint Andrew at St. Andrews Church, and a vestryman at St. Andrews Church.

== Death and honors ==
He survived his wife, Elizabeth, who died in 1976. Eppley died on June 10, 1978, of a heart condition at Leland Memorial Hospital in Riverdale Park, Maryland. He was inducted in the University of Maryland Athletic Hall of Fame in 1982. The Geary F. Eppley Award is awarded annually to the university's senior athlete with the highest grade-point average.

In 2006, the campus recreation center was dedicated as the Geary F. Eppley Recreation Center. His daughter, Frances Eppley Tobin, said, "It's a perfect building for him, because he was so dedicated to athletics and physical fitness." The university had unsuccessfully sought to sell the facility's naming rights to a corporate sponsor. An alumni group had petitioned to rename the Adele H. Stamp Student Union in honor of Eppley, who had organized its creation, but were rebuffed by the university. The school's administration later agreed to dedicating the recreation center to Eppley after an important patron threatened to cut off donations.
