= Curley Byrd =

Athlete, academic, and politician

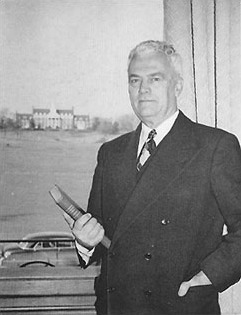
- Byrd as President of the University of Maryland

Biographical details
- Born: February 12, 1889; Crisfield, Maryland, U.S.
- Died: October 2, 1970 (aged 81); Baltimore, Maryland, U.S.

Playing career

Football
- 1905–1907: Maryland
- 1908: George Washington
- 1909: Georgetown

Baseball
- 1912: San Francisco Seals
- Positions: Quarterback (football); Pitcher (baseball)

Coaching career (HC unless noted)

Football
- 1911–1934: Maryland

Baseball
- 1913–1923: Maryland

Administrative career (AD unless noted)
- 1915–1935: Maryland (AD)
- 1918–1932: Maryland (asst. president)
- 1932–1936: Maryland (vice president)
- 1936–1954: Maryland (president)

Head coaching record
- Overall: 119–82–15 (football); 88–73–4 (baseball)

Accomplishments and honors

Championships
- Football; 2 Maryland state (1913–1914)

Harry Clifton "Curley" Byrd (February 12, 1889 – October 2, 1970) was an American university administrator, educator, athlete, coach, and politician. Byrd began a long association with the University of Maryland as an undergraduate in 1905, and eventually rose to the position of university president from 1936 to 1954.

In the interim, he had also served as the university's athletic director and head coach for the football and baseball teams. Byrd amassed a 119–82–15 record in football from 1911 to 1934 and 88–73–4 record in baseball from 1913 to 1923. In graduate school at Georgetown University, he became one of football's early users of the newly legalized forward pass, and he had a brief baseball career including one season as pitcher for the San Francisco Seals.

Byrd resigned as university president in order to enter Democratic Party politics in the 1954 gubernatorial election. He ran an unsuccessful campaign as the Democratic candidate for Maryland governor against Theodore McKeldin. Byrd later received appointments to state offices with responsibilities in the Potomac River and Chesapeake Bay. In the 1960s, he made unsuccessful bids for seats in each chamber of the United States Congress. Byrd was a proponent of a "separate but equal" status of racial segregation in his roles as both university administrator and political candidate.

In 2015, the Student Government Association agreed to a resolution in support of changing the name of Byrd Stadium (now SECU Stadium) because they noted that Byrd was "a racist and a segregationist" who "barred blacks from participating in sports and enrolling into the University until 1951". On September 28, 2015, University of Maryland President Wallace Loh appointed a task force to develop viewpoints and options. The University President then made a recommendation to the University System of Maryland Board of Regents — the governing body of Maryland state universities — to change the name to "Maryland Stadium". The ultimate decision on any name change rests with the Board of Regents. On December 11, 2015, the Board of Regents voted 12–5 to remove the "Byrd" from the stadium's name, renaming it Maryland Stadium temporarily before its naming rights were sold.

== Early life ==
Harry Clifton Byrd was born on February 12, 1889, in Crisfield, Maryland. He was one of six children of oysterman and county commissioner William Franklin Byrd and his wife Sallie May Byrd. In his youth, Byrd worked in the Chesapeake Bay fishing industry, where he saved most of his money to finance his college education. He attended Crisfield High School, where he excelled on the baseball diamond, and was also known as his hometown's first recreational jogger.

A later source described how he appeared in 1905

He was tall, and as the saying goes, built like a whip. He had a startlingly handsome face, with big, flashing eyes, a splotch of florid red on each cheek, and a mane of black curly hair ... He looked like Rupert of Hentzau, and had all of that worthy's cold, sinister resolution about everything that he did.

== College career ==
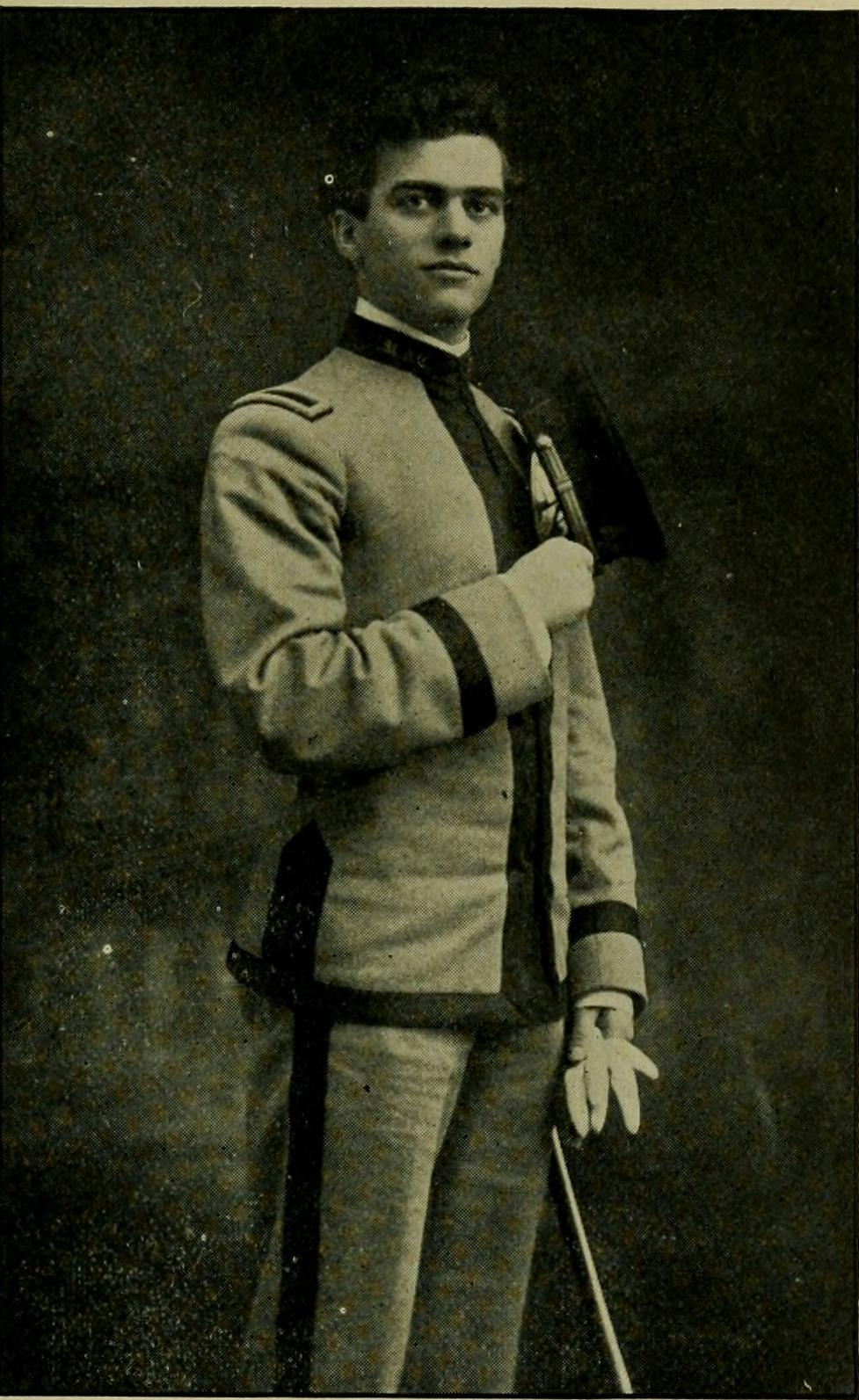
Byrd as a senior at Maryland in 1908

In 1905, Byrd graduated from Crisfield High School and enrolled at the Maryland Agricultural College, which is now known as the University of Maryland. Byrd was a star college athlete and participated in varsity football, baseball, and track. He served as the football team captain in 1907, as the pitcher on the baseball team, and set a school record 10.0-second 100-yard dash in track. Before leaving Crisfield, Byrd's father warned him not to "try to play that thing called football." He ignored the advice and reported for football practice where head coach Fred K. Nielsen told the undersized Byrd to "play with the kids" and that "football's a man's game." He was allowed, however, to fill in as an end on the scout team due to a shortage of players. After sitting out the first three games, Nielsen sent Byrd in as a substitute against Navy, and his play was impressive enough to earn a position on the first team. After the elder Byrd read of his son's newfound stardom in the newspaper, he wrote, "Since you're going to play football, I'm glad to see you're doing it well." During the summers and on weekends, Byrd supplemented his income by continuing work as a fisherman. He graduated second in his class with a Bachelor of Science degree in civil engineering in 1908.

After graduation from Maryland, Byrd spent the next three years doing graduate work in law and journalism at George Washington University, Georgetown University, and Western Maryland College (now known as McDaniel College). In a time before eligibility limitations, he played football at George Washington and Georgetown and ran track at Western Maryland. At Georgetown in 1909, he was called the first quarterback in the East to master the forward pass, several years before Gus Dorais of Notre Dame did so in 1913. According to The Georgetown Hoyas: A Story of A Rambunctious Football Team, Dorais's "end-over-end 'discus' throw was an exact copy" of Byrd's passing technique, and the Irish "got the headlines because they had a press agent and Georgetown didn't."

Byrd also played for Maryland-based semi-professional baseball teams while pursuing his graduate studies. In 1910, the Chicago White Sox signed Byrd, but he was soon traded to the San Francisco Seals, a semi-professional Pacific Coast League baseball team for whom he pitched in 1912. He returned to Maryland later that year, and in 1913, married Katherine Dunlop Turnbull. Before they divorced twenty years later, the couple had three sons and a daughter: Harry, Sterling, William, and Evelyn.

== Coaching career ==
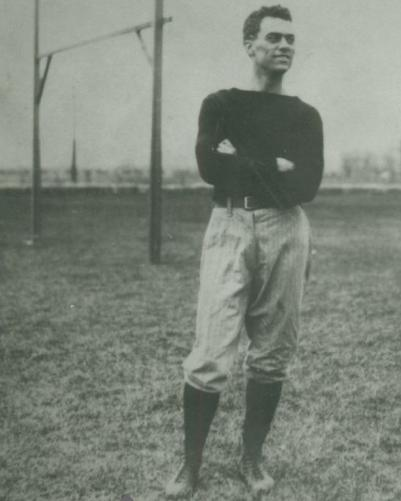
Coach Byrd on the gridiron in 1918

In 1911, injuries claimed enough Maryland Agricultural football players that the team could no longer field a practice squad to scrimmage against. The college turned to Byrd, who was serving as coach at Western High School in Georgetown, and he was willing to help his alma mater with scrimmages. Byrd later replaced head coach Charley Donnelly, who resigned mid-season after accumulating a 2–4–2 record. Byrd led the Aggies to wins in both of their final games of the season, against Western Maryland, 6–0, and Gallaudet, 6–2.

In 1913, the Maryland Agricultural College hired Byrd as an instructor in English and history, and he was named the head coach of the track and baseball teams, the latter of which he coached through 1923. According to author David Ungrady in Tales from the Maryland Terrapins, the university initially offered Byrd $300 to coach football, but he demanded $1,200. The two parties came to agree upon that salary for all of his coaching and teaching duties which spanned nine months of the year. Byrd also worked as a sportswriter for The Washington Star, a job he held until 1932.

As football coach, he developed a unique offensive scheme called the "Byrd system", which combined elements of the single-wing and double-wing formations. One of Byrd's track and football players, Geary Eppley, said, "He never yelled in practice or at a game ... He pointed out mistakes and explained what you did wrong. He took a calm approach. The strongest thing he'd say was 'for cripes sake.'"

In 1915, his duties were expanded to include those of athletic director. That same year, he requested funds for the construction of the campus's first dedicated football stadium, which was named in his honor. During his tenure as head football coach from 1911 to 1934, he compiled a 119–82–15 record.

== Administrative career ==
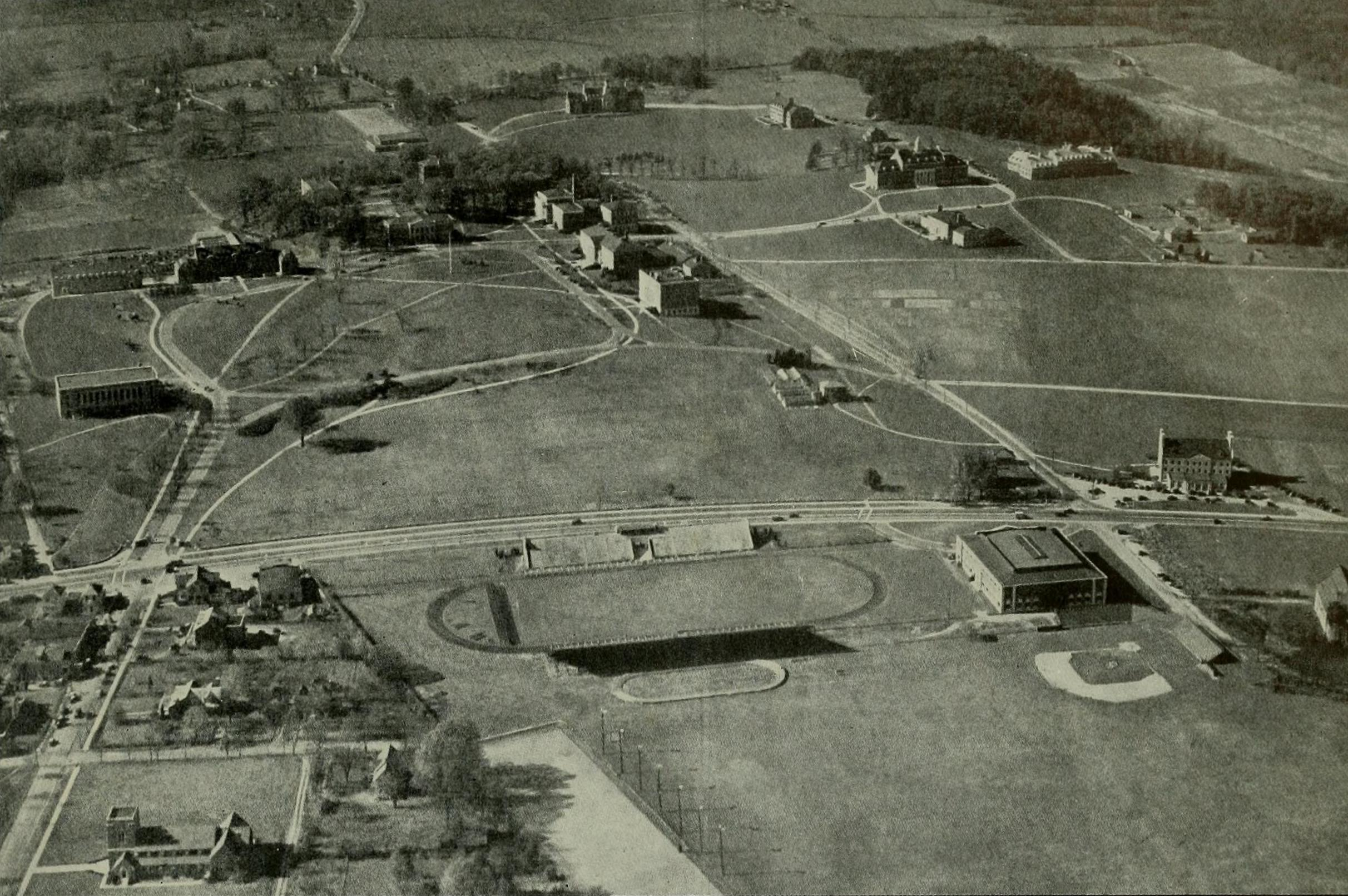
The University of Maryland campus as it appeared in 1938 before the dramatic expansion engineered by President Byrd

Byrd was appointed to the post of assistant university president in 1918. He became a proponent of unification of the Maryland Agricultural College and the Baltimore professional schools into a single public University of Maryland, and he was instrumental in what became the Consolidation Act of 1920. Byrd named the student newspaper The Diamondback in 1921, and in 1933, he was the lead advocate for the adoption of the diamondback terrapin as the university's official nickname and mascot.

In 1932, Byrd was promoted to vice president of the university. In July 1935, he was named the acting president of the university, and was officially appointed to the presidency in February 1936. During his tenure, the budget, facilities, faculty, and enrollment increased significantly. The school budget was increased and the campus expanded largely due to Byrd's deft political maneuvering in Annapolis and Washington. The school also saw a large growth in enrollment, due in part to returning veterans making use of the G.I. Bill after World War II. From 1945 to 1948, the university budget increased from $4.8 million to $9.8 million. Between 1935 and 1954, student enrollment grew from 3,400 to 16,000. Over that same time period, the value of the campus rose from $5 million to $65 million. Byrd, however stood fast on faculty salaries. He reportedly said, "Ph.D.s are a dime a dozen." For years, Byrd refused to release the university's financial records to state legislators, and how exactly he secured funding for many of his projects was largely a mystery. According to booster Jack Heise, Byrd financed a new basketball arena through the out-of-state tuition, paid by the federal government, for Maryland high school graduates who attended the university on the G.I. Bill. The General Accounting Office calculated that the extra fees totaled more than $2 million, but determined that they were within the bounds of legality.

The thing to do with a man of such talents is not to cuss him for doing his job so well; it is much wiser, so long as hanging him is unlawful, to give him a bigger and better one.

— H.L. Mencken on Byrd, The Baltimore Sun

Byrd was a staunch supporter of a "separate but equal" state university system. The Princess Anne campus provided agricultural education and Morgan State College provided liberal arts education for the state's black students, while the University of Maryland remained open only to white students. In 1951, Governor Theodore McKeldin criticized the University of Maryland as an example of wasteful state spending, and was especially critical of expansions to the Princess Anne campus, which was geographically disconnected from the state's black population and not attracting many students to study agriculture. Contractors had begun projects at the college before approval from the public works board, which was described as a usual practice under Byrd. Byrd acceded to McKeldin and secured approval from the board for both the Princess Anne expansions as well as a sizable increase to the university budget.

In 1945, Byrd hired 32-year-old Paul "Bear" Bryant to his first head coaching post. Bryant led the Terrapins to a 6–2–1 record, but the two personalities clashed. The tensions came to a head when Byrd reinstated a player Bryant had suspended for violating team rules. Bryant resigned as head coach an hour later, which caused an uproar among students until he interceded to restore order.

Two years later, Byrd hired Jim Tatum as football coach. The year prior at Oklahoma, Tatum fielded a winning team, but the athletic department ran up a huge deficit and some players were paid in violation of conference rules, which resulted in university president George Cross firing athletic director Jap Haskell. The media blamed Tatum for his termination. Tatum told Cross to refute Tatum's role in the matter, and threatened to reveal the Oklahoma team had been paid $6,000 after the 1947 Gator Bowl. Cross asked Byrd to persuade Tatum not to go public, and according to author Gary King in An Autumn Remembered, Byrd replied, "Persuade, hell! I'll tell him to keep his damn mouth shut!" Tatum remained as coach at Maryland from 1947 to 1955, and amassed a 73–15–4 record.

In 1948, the National Collegiate Athletic Association passed a set of regulations called the Purity Code, later renamed the Sanity Code, which permitted student-athletes free tuition and meals, but required that part-time jobs be legitimate and their pay commensurate with the work. Schools found to be in violation could be expelled from the NCAA. In 1950, seven schools, called the "Sinful Seven"—Virginia, Maryland, VMI, Virginia Tech, The Citadel, Boston College, and Villanova—admitted they were in violation of the code. Time magazine asserted violators were far more widespread than those seven that had confessed. Maryland was the only Sinful Seven school that was also a major football power with eighty scholarship players, and Byrd led them in their stand against the Sanity Code. University of Virginia president Colgate Darden called the code hypocritical, and The Citadel's leadership refused to "lie to stay in the association" and requested termination of its NCAA membership. At the convention to decide Virginia's fate, Byrd said, "Does Ohio State want to vote for expulsion of Virginia, when Ohio State has facilities to take care of four or five as many athletes as Virginia?" The ensuing vote fell 25 short of the needed two-thirds majority to expel the Sinful Seven.

In 1951, the football team's 10–0 season culminated in a 28–13 victory over first-ranked Tennessee in the 1952 Sugar Bowl. Maryland's participation, however, was in violation of a Southern Conference resolution passed mid-season that banned participation in postseason bowl games. Byrd had Maryland accept the bowl invitation, despite Tatum's objections. The coach thought the threatened sanctions, which prevented Maryland from playing any Southern Conference games the following season, would severely disadvantage his team. In 1952, Maryland and Clemson, which had also violated the bowl game ban, were sanctioned, and the incident hastened the break-up of the Southern Conference and formation of the Atlantic Coast Conference, of which both schools were founding members.

Dictator, president, athletic director, football coach, comptroller, chief lobbyist and glamour boy supreme ... Curley is the most-hated and most-beloved man in Maryland.

— Bob Considine, Curley Byrd Catches the Worm, 1941

Opponents in The Baltimore Sun alleged that Byrd emphasized athletics over academics and belittled him as the only college football coach to rise to the position of university president. Among the campus expansions, Byrd was responsible for the construction of Byrd Stadium in 1950 and Cole Field House in 1955, which at the time was the largest basketball arena in the Southern Conference. Critics alleged that both facilities were constructed at the expense of campus libraries. Byrd also built the University of Maryland Golf Course in 1959. Byrd resigned from the post in 1953 and his tenure ended effectively on December 31.

== Political career ==
Byrd resigned from the presidency in January 1954 to embark upon an unsuccessful campaign for Governor of Maryland. He narrowly beat perennial candidate George P. Mahoney in the Democratic primary by 50.64% to 49.37% and faced Republican incumbent McKeldin in the general election. Byrd campaigned on his stance of separate but equal. McKeldin won comfortable majorities in Baltimore's black, Jewish, and upper-middle class white districts, while Byrd took all of the blue-collar white South and East Baltimore neighborhoods, including McKeldin's boyhood home along Eutaw Street. Elsewhere in the state, however, middle-class white voters did not support Byrd. Byrd lost by 54.46% to 45.54%. He went on to make unsuccessful bids for the Democratic nominations to the U.S. Senate in 1964 and the U.S. Congress in 1966.

Despite his lack of success in campaigning, Byrd did receive several gubernatorial appointments: Chairman of the Maryland Tidewater Fisheries Commission, Maryland Commissioner to the Potomac River Fisheries Commission, and Chairman of the Commission on Chesapeake Bay Affairs. In 1959, Governor J. Millard Tawes appointed Byrd as commissioner of tidewater fisheries. When a fisheries officer killed a Virginian waterman illegally dredging, Byrd disarmed the force. The action was credited with helping to end the long-standing Potomac River Oyster Wars. Following the example of other oyster-producing states, Byrd authorized fossil shell mining to produce culch, crushed shells used to form oyster beds. Byrd ignored Tawes' warning to "stay away from private planting" by promoting the formation of leasing cooperatives, but his plan failed due to opposition in the Maryland General Assembly.

== Business career ==
Byrd was also active in business and civic organizations. In 1951, he was involved in the merger that formed the Suburban Trust Company, which in 1960 was the largest bank in Maryland outside of Baltimore City. He later served as the company's vice president. Byrd also did business in real estate and construction. Byrd was active with service organizations. In 1962, he became a member of the Loyal Order of the Moose. Byrd organized the College Park Rotary Club and served as its first president. Byrd was a member of the Defense Orientation Conference Association (DOCA), an organization which educates civilians on the Defense Department's programs and policies.

== Death ==
Byrd died of a heart condition on October 2, 1970, at the University of Maryland Hospital in Baltimore, Maryland. He is interred at Asbury United Methodist Church Cemetery in Crisfield, Maryland, and his epitaph reads: "Harry Clifton 'Curley' Byrd, Educator–Statesman–Conservationist, President Emeritus, Father and Builder of the Greater Consolidated University of Maryland, Founded 1920." Byrd was inducted into the University of Maryland Athletic Hall of Fame in 1982.

== Head coaching record ==
=== Football ===
Year	Team	Overall	Conference	Standing	Bowl/playoffs
Maryland / Maryland State Aggies (Independent) (1911–1916)
1911	Maryland	2–0			
1912	Maryland	6–1–1			
1913	Maryland	6–3			
1914	Maryland	5–3			
1915	Maryland	6–3			
1916	Maryland State	6–2			
Maryland State / Maryland Aggies (South Atlantic Intercollegiate Athletic Association) (1917–1921)
1917	Maryland State	4–3–1	2–1–1	T–4th	
1918	Maryland State	4–1–1	2–0–1	T–2nd	
1919	Maryland State	5–4	4–1	2nd	
1920	Maryland	7–2	4–0	2nd	
1921	Maryland	3–5–1	2–1–1	6th	
Maryland Aggies / Terrapins (Southern Conference) (1922–1934)
1922	Maryland	4–5–1	1–2	T–11th	
1923	Maryland	7–2–1	2–1	T–8th	
1924	Maryland	3–3–3	1–2–1	16th	
1925	Maryland	2–5–1	0–4	T–20th	
1926	Maryland	5–4–1	1–3–1	17th	
1927	Maryland	4–7	3–5	15th	
1928	Maryland	6–3–1	2–3–1	T–14th	
1929	Maryland	4–4–2	1–3–1	17th	
1930	Maryland	7–5	4–2	T–6th	
1931	Maryland	8–1–1	4–1–1	5th	
1932	Maryland	5–6	2–4	16th	
1933	Maryland	3–7	1–4	9th	
1934	Maryland	7–3	3–1	T–3rd	
Maryland / Maryland State:		119–82–15			
Total:		119–82–15			

=== Baseball ===
Record table
Season	Team	Overall	Postseason
Maryland / Maryland State Aggies () (1913–1923)
1913	Maryland	13–2	
1914	Maryland	10–4–1	
1915	Maryland	3–6	
1916	Maryland	4–11–1	
1917	Maryland State	0–5	
1918	Maryland State	4–6	
1919	Maryland State	1–0	
1920	Maryland State	18–8	
1921	Maryland	13–5–2	
1922	Maryland	14–9	
1923	Maryland	8–16	
Maryland / Maryland State:		88–73–4	
Total:		88–73–4	

Party political offices
Preceded by William Preston Lane Jr.	Democratic nominee for Governor of Maryland; 1954	Succeeded by J. Millard Tawes
