= William W. Cobey =

American university administrator (1908-1998)

William Wilfred Cobey (March 12, 1908 – April 20, 1998) was an American university administrator. He served as the athletic director at the University of Maryland from 1956 to 1969.

A native of Quincy, Florida, Cobey attended the University of Maryland where he played on the freshman lacrosse team. He was a member of the Kappa Alpha Order. Cobey graduated with an A.B. from the College of Arts and Sciences in 1930. The University of Maryland appointed Cobey, former graduate manager, as athletic director in 1956, replacing Jim Tatum. In 1965, he fired Tom Nugent as football coach upon the conclusion of his five-year contract with a disappointing 4–6 season. He presided over the hiring of baseball coach Elton "Jack" Jackson in 1960, and football coaches Lou Saban in 1966, and Bob Ward in 1967. He retired as athletic director on June 30, 1968. Cobey was succeeded by Maryland track coach Jim Kehoe.

Cobey died on April 20, 1998, at his home in University Park, Maryland, at the age of 90. He was inducted into the University of Maryland Athletic Hall of Fame in 1984. His son, William W. Cobey, Jr., served as athletic director at the University of North Carolina, Chapel Hill and a North Carolina Representative in the United States Congress from 1985 to 1987. Cobey's wife, Mary Gray Munroe Cobey (1912-2005), was a notable alumna of Wesleyan University, as well as a longtime correspondent and friend of Soong Ching-ling.
