= Dick Dull =

American athletic director (1945–2026)

Biographical details
- Born: 1945; Biglerville, Pennsylvania, U.S.
- Died: January 6, 2026 (aged 80)

Playing career
- 1963–1967: Maryland
- Position: Javelin thrower

Administrative career (AD unless noted)
- 1981–1986: Maryland
- 1996–1998: Nebraska–Kearney
- 1998–1999: Moravian
- 1999–2005: Cal State–Northridge
- 2007–2009: Belmont Abbey

Accomplishments and honors

Championships
- ACC javelin throw (1966)

Richard Dull (1945 – January 6, 2026) was an American athletic director and athlete. He served as the athletic director of the University of Maryland from 1981 to 1986, including during the death of Len Bias, which prompted Dull's resignation. He was also athletic director at the University of Nebraska at Kearney, Moravian College, California State University, Northridge, and Belmont Abbey College.

== Early life and education ==
Dull was born in 1945. He attended Biglerville High School in Biglerville, Pennsylvania, where he played basketball and competed in track and field in the javelin throw event. As a sophomore, he won the state championship. He suffered a serious injury to his elbow ligament, but recovered and finished as a runner-up in the state championship during his senior year in 1963. As of 2008, he still held the school's record at 198 feet and 6 inches.

He attended college at the University of Maryland, where he continued competing in the javelin throw at the intercollegiate level. As a senior in 1966, he won the Atlantic Coast Conference championship in the event at 223 feet and 3.5 inches. That year, he also placed in the top-ten in the NCAA event.

== Athletic director ==
=== Maryland ===
After receiving a Juris Doctor degree, he took a pay cut from $22,000 to $8,500 and became an assistant ticket manager at his alma mater. He rose through the ranks of the Maryland athletic department and became athletic director in 1981, succeeding Jim Kehoe. In January 1982, Dull hired Bobby Ross to succeed Jerry Claiborne as the school's head football coach. The hire was somewhat surprising as Ross, then an assistant coach for the Kansas City Chiefs, was not a high-profile coach. Ross described himself as a "no name". Nevertheless, Maryland had great success under Ross, and quarterback Boomer Esiason excelled in his pro-style offense.

During Dull's tenure, the Maryland football and men's basketball teams both secured ACC championships, and the women's basketball team advanced to the Final Four. Dull was serving as athletic director when Maryland basketball star Len Bias died from a cocaine-induced heart attack in 1986. He resigned his post on November 4 citing the incident. He agreed to remain on the staff for one year as an athletic and policy advisor.

=== After Maryland ===
Bias's death and the controversy it created affected Dull. The Baltimore Sun called Dull "one of the rising stars" in his profession at the time of the incident. Dull later said, "I survived it. No one can ever bring Len Bias back, and that I regret. He was a wonderful young man." In 1987, the University of Texas at El Paso offered Dull a job as its athletic director, but he eventually declined the offer. In the decade following Bias' death, Dull worked in real estate, consulting, and lived off of his savings. In two years during that period, he earned less than $7,500, which was less than required to file an income tax return. He said, "I could not get a job interview (in athletics) for 10 years."

In 1996, he was a candidate for athletic director at Radford University. That year, he was hired as the athletic director at the University of Nebraska at Kearney, a Division II school. In 1999 while the athletic director at Moravian College, he was hired by California State University, Northridge, his first Division I athletic director job since Maryland. The hiring was controversial, and some members of the university's advisory board demanded it be reviewed and overturned. In 2001, Northridge dropped its football program on Dull's recommendation to the Board of Trustees. He stepped down in 2005.

Dull eventually retired, but returned to his work as the athletic director of Belmont Abbey College in June 2007. In 2008, he established an athletic hall of fame at the school. In August 2009, Dull resigned from Belmont Abbey with a statement that he had been hired for a transition to a full-time athletic director and that the transition period had elapsed.

== Death ==
Dull died on January 6, 2026, at the age of 80.
