= Bill Guckeyson =

American athlete and military aviator (1915–1944)

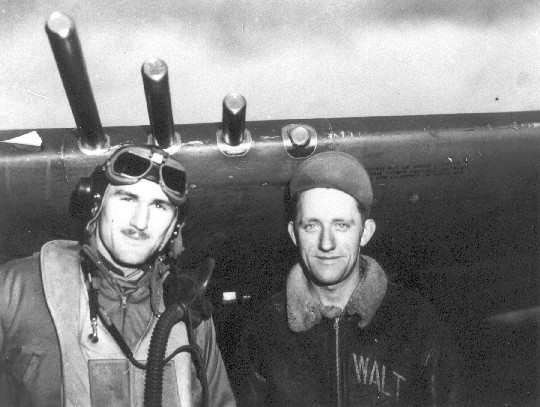
- Captain John W. Guckeyson, left, and his crew chief, S/Sgt. Alvin H. Walther, pose in front of his P-47 fighter.

Profile
- Positions: Halfback, punter

Personal information
- Born: July 7, 1915; Washington, D.C., U.S.
- Died: May 21, 1944 (aged 28); Stendal, Germany
- Listed height: 6 ft 0 in (1.83 m)
- Listed weight: 185 lb (84 kg)

Career information
- High school: Bethesda-Chevy Chase (MD)
- College: Maryland
- NFL draft: 1937: 6th round, 51st overall pick

Awards and highlights
- 2× First-team All-SoCon (1935, 1936); Touchdown Club Hall of Fame; University of Maryland Athletic Hall of Fame; 1941 All-America first team (soccer)

John William Guckeyson (/ˈɡaɪkɪsən/; July 7, 1915 – May 21, 1944) was an American athlete and military aviator. He was the first University of Maryland football player selected in the NFL draft. Guckeyson was killed in combat as a fighter pilot during the Second World War.

== Early life and college career ==
Guckeyson was born in Washington, D.C. He attended Bethesda-Chevy Chase High School, where he played basketball, soccer, and competed in track & field. At the 1932 Maryland state track meet, he won the 100-yard dash with a time of 10.2 seconds and set a state shot put record—50 feet (15 meters)—that stood for 28 years. He was the captain of the varsity soccer team for three years and of the basketball team for two years. He graduated from high school in 1933.

Although B-CC had no football team, Guckeyson's soccer skills won him a football scholarship to the University of Maryland, where he played football, basketball, and baseball, and ran track. He set the school javelin throw record: 204 ft 5 in (62.31 meters). In 1935 and 1936, he was named an All-Southern Conference football player and an honorable-mention All-American. Frank Dobson—who coached football for 40 years at Georgia, Clemson, South Carolina, Richmond, and Maryland—said Guckeyson was the best athlete he had known. He earned nine varsity letters during his four years at Maryland.

During his senior year, Guckeyson was elected class president.

== Military career ==
Upon graduation from Maryland, Guckeyson was selected by the Philadelphia Eagles in the sixth round of the 1937 NFL draft, the first Maryland player so selected. However, he turned down offers to play professional sports, and instead accepted a nomination to attend the United States Military Academy at West Point. Guckeyson, no longer eligible to play football, was named a first-team All-American in soccer in 1941, the first Army soccer player to earn the distinction. Once again, he was elected class president.

Guckeyson graduated from West Point in 1942 and received a commission as an officer in the United States Army. He again turned down offers for a professional sports career when the Washington Senators' owner Clark Griffith and pitcher Walter Johnson asked him to join the major league. He attended flight school and was certified as a fighter pilot in the United States Army Air Forces before being deployed overseas in December 1942.

As a fighter pilot, Guckeyson earned a Purple Heart, three Air Medals, and two Distinguished Flying Crosses—the fourth-highest award for combat valor in flight. While serving in the 375th Fighter Squadron, 361st Fighter Group, Guckeyson flew a P-47 Thunderbolt ("Contrary Mary"), then a P-51 Mustang (serial: 42–103349) after his unit switched to the newer aircraft. He was credited with shooting down at least 2.5 enemy aircraft in aerial combat: two Bf 109 fighters and a Ju-188 night fighter, which was destroyed with the assistance of another pilot. Captain Guckeyson was killed on a strafing run on 21 May 1944 when his P-51 Mustang was shot down. His remains are interred at the Lorraine American Cemetery and Memorial in Saint-Avold, France.

In 1955, Bethesda-Chevy Chase High School named its athletic playing field Guckeyson Memorial Stadium in his honor. He was inducted into the Touchdown Club Hall of Fame, and in 1982, the University of Maryland Athletic Hall of Fame. Maryland's M Club annually honors the university's most outstanding male student-athlete with the John W. Guckeyson award.
