= Joe F. Blair =

American sports publicist

Joseph F. Blair (May 12, 1923 – November 15, 1995; written as joe f. blair) was an American sports publicist for the University of Maryland and the Washington Redskins of the National Football League.

== Biography ==
A native of Freeport, Pennsylvania, Blair graduated from Freeport High School in 1941. He served in the United States Army Air Forces for three years as a tail gunner during the Second World War. During a mission, he lost part of a finger from combat wounds and received the Purple Heart. Blair attended the University of Pittsburgh after the war and later transferred to the University of Missouri. He was a member of the Sigma Chi fraternity.

In 1950, the University of Maryland hired Blair as its sports information director. The Washington Post credited him with publicizing the 1953 Maryland Terrapins football team with the voters for national championship selection, many of whom were unable to see the team firsthand. In 1962, Blair left Maryland to work for the Washington Redskins as the club's publicity director. Blair returned to the University of Maryland in 1983 as an assistant sports information director for Jack Zane. The Atlantic Coast Conference honored Blair with the Marvin "Skeeter" Francis Award for service in 1993. Blair developed a reputation for being protective of Maryland's players. He persuaded senior quarterback John Kaleo to speak to the media for the first time a week before the season. According to Blair, "The kid had never played a full game at Maryland ... I said, 'Look, son, if you play a bad game, these reporters are going to destroy you. You better go out and make as many friends as you can, in case you don't become a star.'"

Blair suffered a stroke on a flight to attend the Maryland–Louisville football game on October 27, 1995. He was hospitalized in Allegheny General Hospital in Pittsburgh, where he died on November 15, 1995. During his hospitalization, Maryland dedicated its game against NC State to Blair, which it won, 30–13, to secure its first winning season since 1990.

Blair spelled his name in all lowercase letters on news releases. He once told The Baltimore Sun, "Don't you write about this in the paper. If you're going to get the space, give it to some deserving kid." Eighteen children were named in honor of Blair by his friends. According to The Sun, he never forgot the name of any of Maryland's football or lacrosse players.

The press box at Byrd Stadium was named the Blair–Zane Media Work Area partly in his honor in 1991. In November 1996, the University of Maryland established the Joe F. Blair Memorial Scholarship Fund in his memory. The University of Maryland Athletic Hall of Fame inducted Blair in 2005.
