= 2009 Maryland Terrapins football team =

American college football season

2009 Maryland Terrapins football
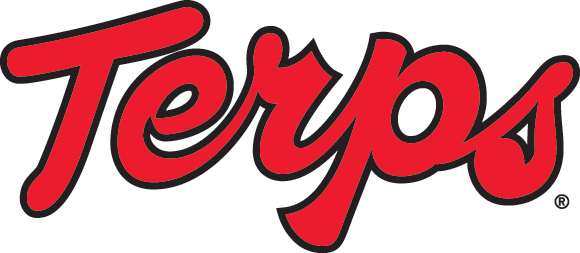
- Conference: Atlantic Coast Conference
- Atlantic Division
- Record: 2–10 (1–7 ACC)
- Head coach: Ralph Friedgen (9th season)
- Offensive coordinator: James Franklin (2nd season)
- Offensive scheme: West Coast
- Defensive coordinator: Don Brown (1st season)
- Base defense: 4–3
- Home stadium: Byrd Stadium

2009 Atlantic Coast Conference football standings
	Conf.			Overall
Team	W		L	W		L
Atlantic Division
No. 24 Clemson x	6	–	2	9	–	5
Boston College	5	–	3	8	–	5
Florida State	4	–	4	7	–	6
Wake Forest	3	–	5	5	–	7
NC State	2	–	6	5	–	7
Maryland	1	–	7	2	–	10
Coastal Division
No. 13 Georgia Tech * x$	7	–	1	11	–	3
No. 10 Virginia Tech	6	–	2	10	–	3
No. 19 Miami (FL)	5	–	3	9	–	4
North Carolina *	0	–	4	0	–	5
Duke	3	–	5	5	–	7
Virginia	2	–	6	3	–	9
Championship: Georgia Tech 39, Clemson 34
$ – BCS representative as conference champion; North Carolina vacated 8 wins, including 4 ACC wins.; Rankings from AP Poll

The 2009 Maryland Terrapins football team represented the University of Maryland during its 57th season in the Atlantic Coast Conference. The Terrapins played in the Atlantic Division of the conference, and competed against all five divisional opponents, two Coastal Division opponents on a rotational basis, and one permanent cross-divisional rival: Virginia. The rotating Coastal Division opponents were Virginia Tech and Duke. In 2009, Maryland played its second game of the home-to-home series against California, this year in Berkeley.

The Terrapins finished the season with a record of 2–10, and 1–7 in ACC play, and failed to qualify for a bowl game. It was the first ten-loss season in school history.

== Before the season ==
=== Coaching changes ===
==== Head coach-in-waiting ====
On February 6, 2009, offensive coordinator James Franklin was officially named the head coach-in-waiting to succeed the 61-year-old Ralph Friedgen, who had three years remaining on his contract. ESPN described the move as an effort to ensure Franklin, considered a top recruiter who had had other coaching opportunities, remained with Maryland.

==== Defensive coordinator ====
Upon the conclusion of the 2008 regular season, defensive coordinator Chris Cosh announced his resignation. Cosh returned to Kansas State as defensive coordinator and assistant coach to the recently re-hired Bill Snyder, who had been head coach from 1996 to 2005. Cosh previously served under Snyder as linebackers coach from 2004 to 2005.

Outside linebackers coach Al Seamonson assumed interim defensive coordinator duties for the last game of the 2008 season, the Humanitarian Bowl, and was considered in the running for the job full-time. Maryland head coach Ralph Friedgen also contacted Navy defensive coordinator Buddy Green in order to gauge his interest for the position, but he declined in order to remain at Annapolis. South Carolina secondary coach was also considered, but declined in order to take a job at the same position at LSU with a $300,000 salary.

On January 9, 2009, it was announced that Massachusetts head coach Don Brown had been hired as the new defensive coordinator. Brown had served as head coach for UMass from 2004 to 2008, posting the best five-year record in school history, 43–19. His teams were ranked amongst the top-20 defenses in the nation three times: third in 2005, 20th in 2006, and 14th in 2007. The UMass scoring defense was ranked first in 2005 and fifth in 2006. Brown also has prior experience as a head coach at Northeastern and Plymouth State and 11 years as a defensive coordinator. In a move to address criticisms of former coordinator Chris Cosh's defensive system which had been characterized as overcautious, Ralph Friedgen said about Brown:

"He's going to be aggressive. He has a very aggressive philosophy, and he plays a different style defense than the norm. He's been successful against a lot of the new offenses that we're seeing, like the spread. He played against Navy and Georgia Southern, so he's faced a lot of the different styles we see, but he has a little different approach to it."

==== Other coaching positions ====
For 2009, new defensive coordinator Don Brown will also oversee the cornerbacks, a role held in the previous season by secondary coach Kevin Lempa. Lempa will now coach only the safeties. Former inside linebackers coach Al Seamonson expanded his role to take over the entire linebacker corps. Friedgen expressed a strong desire to retain Seamonson, who lost out on the race for the defensive coordinator job. Seamonson, as interim defensive coordinator, helped coach Maryland to a 42–35 victory in the 2008 Humanitarian Bowl.

Maryland also lost special teams and tight ends coach, Danny Pearman, to Clemson at the end of the 2008 season. Shortly after being selected as Tommy Bowden's permanent replacement, head coach Dabo Swinney hired Clemson alum Pearman. Pearman played at Clemson as a tight end (1984–1987) and coached special teams and offensive and defensive tackles while at Alabama (1990–1997). Swinney himself played at Alabama during that period as a wide receiver.

=== Key losses ===
Prior to the 2009 season, Maryland lost a significant amount of experience due to graduation. Thirty seniors, the largest class of Friedgen's tenure, graduated after the 2008 season or otherwise concluded their eligibility. Additionally, the team lost the previous season's receiving leader and feature wide receiver to the NFL draft. Starting Z-receiver Darrius Heyward-Bey announced that he would forgo his senior year in order to enter the 2009 NFL draft on January 7, 2009. In just three years, Heyward-Bey had achieved the number-two spot for Maryland career receiving yards (2,089), behind only Jermaine Lewis. It had been widely speculated throughout the 2008 season that the junior would likely leave for the draft, and Rivals.com, College Football News, Sports Illustrated, and ESPN projected him as an early entrant and first-round selection. He was ultimately chosen as the seventh overall pick.

Mobile quarterback Josh Portis transferred to the Division II school California University of Pennsylvania for his last year of eligibility. He had been highly anticipated as a Florida transfer and a dual-threat quarterback, but had seen little action in eight games, almost exclusively put in for one option run at a time. Portis recorded one completion on three pass attempts, 31 rushing attempts for 186 yards and one touchdown. He saw a decrease in game action after the North Carolina game, where he participated in three plays including an incomplete pass to a wide open Darrius Heyward-Bey for a probable touchdown and a fumble on an option run.

In February 2009, wide receiver LaQuan Williams became academically ineligible and was dismissed from the team. Friedgen said that Williams could possibly return for the fall. Williams was injured throughout the 2008 season, but recorded a strong 2007 campaign including a crucial reception in the upset win over 10th-ranked Rutgers.

The following are some of the key players who will no longer play for Maryland in the 2009 season:

Offense:

- Darrius Heyward-Bey (WR)^{†}
- Dan Gronkowski (TE)
- Danny Oquendo (WR)
- Josh Portis (QB)^{‡}
- Edwin Williams (OL)

Defense:

- Kevin Barnes (CB)
- Moise Fokou (LB)
- Jeremy Navarre (DL)
- Dave Philistin (LB)

Special teams:

- Obi Egekeze (K)

† – Heyward-Bey entered the NFL Draft a year early
‡ – Portis transferred to California University of Pennsylvania

=== Key returns ===
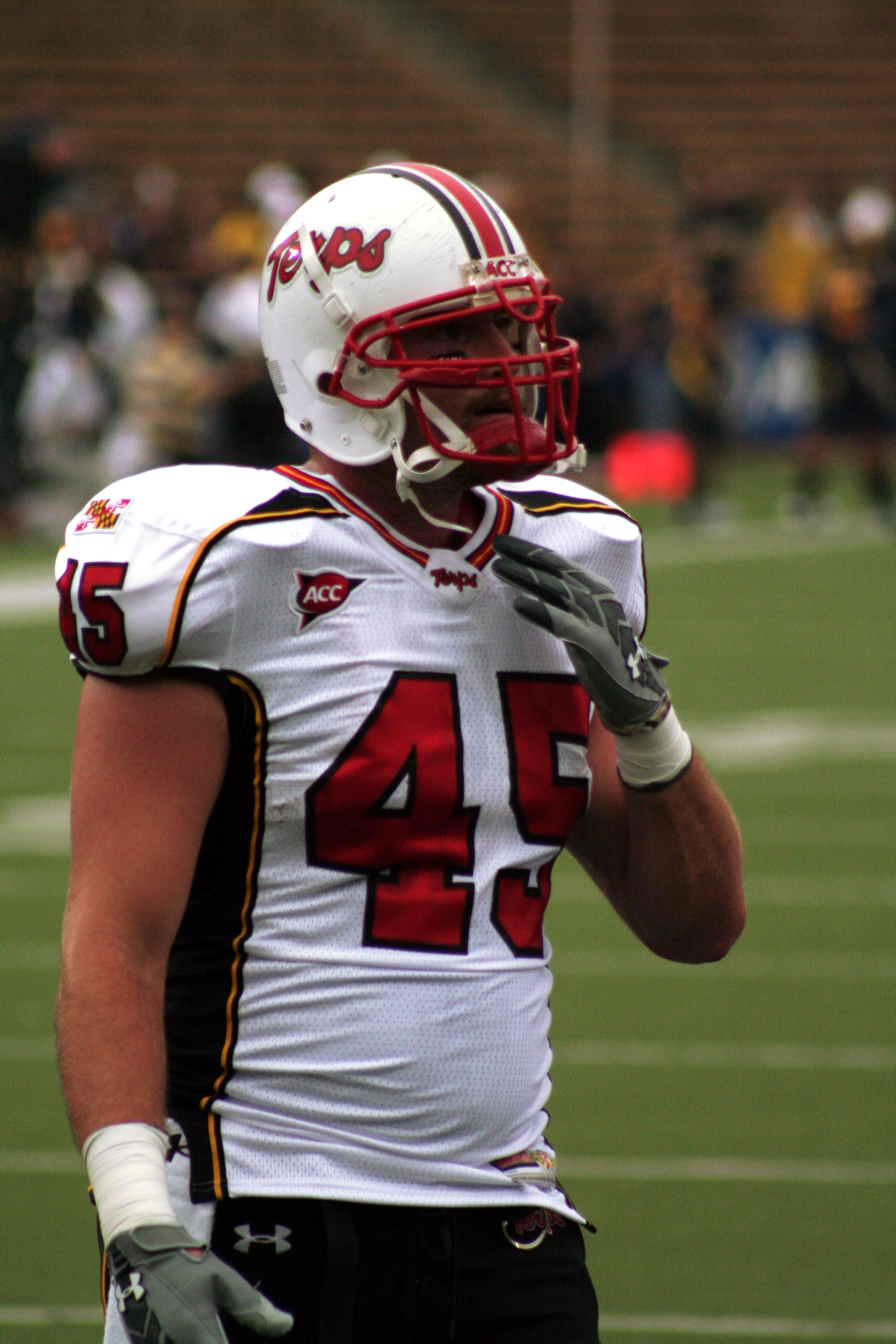
Reserve tight end Tommy Galt at California during the season

Maryland entered the 2009 season with just nine returning starters, the fewest in the ACC, and 56% of its lettermen from the prior year, the lowest of any team other than the service academies. The defensive and offensive lines suffered significant attrition, but the Terrapins are considered deep at the skill positions. Senior quarterback Chris Turner was called a "big-game performer [with] a chance to leave an imprint on the school record books." Maryland returned its three top running backs from 2008: Da'Rel Scott, Davin Meggett, and Morgan Green. Despite the loss of Heyward-Bey, the Terrapins retained a great deal of athleticism at the wide receiver position with Torrey Smith, and Ronnie Tyler replaced Danny Oquendo as a reliable third-down option. In total, Maryland entered the season with ten potential starters at wide receiver.

Offense:

- Phil Costa (C), most experienced returning lineman
- Da'Rel Scott (RB), returning leader in rushing yards (959)
- Torrey Smith (WR), returning leader in receiving yards (303)
- Chris Turner (QB), returning leader in passing yards (2,318)

Defense:

- Jamari McCollough (DB), returning leader in interceptions (4)
- Alex Wujciak (ILB), second-leading ACC tackler in 2008 (133)

Special teams:

- Travis Baltz (P)
- Torrey Smith (WR/RS), ACC record for kick return yards (1,089)

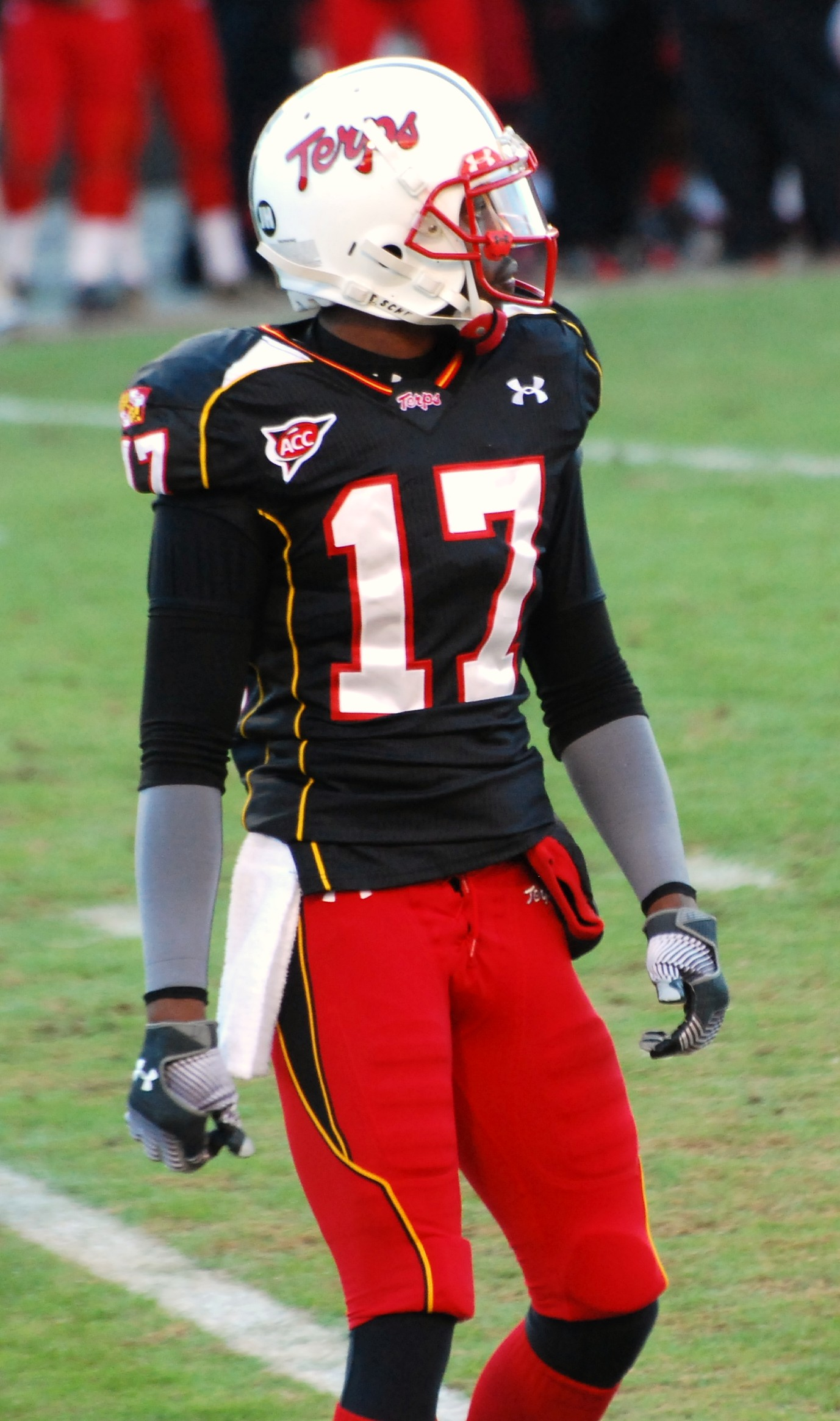
Wide receiver Quintin McCree during the game against Boston College.

=== Recruiting ===
Maryland secured several highly touted recruits, and Rivals.com rated the recruiting class as 25th in the nation, while Scout.com ranked it 26th in the nation. Scout or Rivals.com four-star prospects included running backs Caleb Porzel and D.J. Adams, defensive lineman De'Onte Arnett, defensive back Travis Hawkins, and offensive lineman Pete White. The class also included eight linebackers, a position which Maryland had heavily recruited in order to backfill graduated players. Offensive tackle Nick Klemm had originally planned to go to Boston College, but de-committed to sign with the Terrapins after Eagles' head coach Jeff Jagodzinski was fired.

Maryland showed a strong interest in Porzel's Good Counsel classmate Jelani Jenkins, the number-one ranked prospective linebacker in the nation. Jenkins narrowed his possible school selection to a field of fifteen including Maryland, before ultimately signing with Florida. Tavon Austin, a Rivals.com four-star running back from Baltimore, committed to West Virginia despite strong interest from Maryland. On February 2, 2009, three-star offensive tackle Ryan Schlieper de-committed from Maryland and signed with Pittsburgh.

On National Signing Day, the Terps secured thirteen recruits from Maryland and Washington, D.C. Four of the Rivals.com top-ten prospects in the state signed with Maryland. ESPN graded the class as a "B−", with the main criticism being that "too much good in-state talent has slipped away." It also cited a failure to land a highly rated quarterback. During the signing day news conference, Friedgen stated:

"We are very happy with this class. It is a large recruiting class. I feel that it met a lot of our needs. We lost a lot of [linebackers, offensive lineman, and defensive lineman last year]. We were able to fill those needs with this class of players. I think that if you were to describe this recruiting class, they are a big, athletic bunch of athletes who can run and hit. They are also good students. I am really putting an emphasis on guys who can be successful in life, and who have goals that they want to achieve ... We have 15 local-area players. There are some others that we would have liked to have, but you are never going to get all of them. We put a lot of stock in trying to recruit the local-area kids."

College recruiting
Name	Hometown	School	Height	Weight	40^{‡}	Commit date
Travis Hawkins; CB	Gaithersburg, MD	Quince Orchard HS	5 ft 11 in (1.80 m)	185 lb (84 kg)	4.42	Oct 30, 2008
Travis Hawkins; CB	Recruit ratings: Scout: Rivals: (80)					
De'Onte Arnett; DE	Forestville, MD	Forestville HS	6 ft 4 in (1.93 m)	235 lb (107 kg)	4.80	Jul 3, 2008
De'Onte Arnett; DE	Recruit ratings: Scout: Rivals: (78)					
Caleb Porzel; RB	Olney, MD	Our Lady Good Counsel HS	5 ft 7 in (1.70 m)	172 lb (78 kg)	–	Jul 14, 2008
Caleb Porzel; RB	Recruit ratings: Scout: Rivals: (77)					
D.J. Adams; RB	Norcross, GA	Norcross HS	5 ft 9.5 in (1.77 m)	211 lb (96 kg)	4.55	Jul 21, 2008
D.J. Adams; RB	Recruit ratings: Scout: Rivals: (81)					
Pete White; OL	Washington, D.C.	St. Johns College HS	6 ft 5 in (1.96 m)	325 lb (147 kg)	5.30	Feb 4, 2009
Pete White; OL	Recruit ratings: Scout: Rivals: (N/A)					
Lorne Goree; WLB	Springdale, MD	Charles Herbert Flowers HS	6 ft 2 in (1.88 m)	200 lb (91 kg)	4.65	Jun 23, 2008
Lorne Goree; WLB	Recruit ratings: Scout: Rivals: (75)					
Darin Drakeford; WLB	Washington, D.C.	Roosevelt HS	6 ft 0 in (1.83 m)	225 lb (102 kg)	4.56	Oct 30, 2008
Darin Drakeford; WLB	Recruit ratings: Scout: Rivals: (N/A)					
Avery Murray; WLB	Florence, SC	West Florence HS	6 ft 1 in (1.85 m)	220 lb (100 kg)	–	Jul 17, 2008
Avery Murray; WLB	Recruit ratings: Scout: Rivals: (77)					
Danny O'Brien; QB	Kernersville, NC	East Forsyth HS	6 ft 3.5 in (1.92 m)	196 lb (89 kg)	4.78	Jun 5, 2008
Danny O'Brien; QB	Recruit ratings: Scout: Rivals: (73)					
David Stinebaugh; TE	Baltimore, MD	Perry Hall HS	6 ft 4.5 in (1.94 m)	202 lb (92 kg)	4.69	Jun 10, 2008
David Stinebaugh; TE	Recruit ratings: Scout: Rivals: (72)					
C.J. Brown; QB	Harmony, PA	Seneca Valley SHS	6 ft 3 in (1.91 m)	200 lb (91 kg)	4.70	Apr 15, 2008
C.J. Brown; QB	Recruit ratings: Scout: Rivals: (77)					
Pete DeSouza; OT	Hyattsville, MD	Dematha Catholic HS	6 ft 6 in (1.98 m)	295 lb (134 kg)	5.30	Jun 23, 2008
Pete DeSouza; OT	Recruit ratings: Scout: Rivals: (74)					
David Mackall; DE/LB	Baltimore, MD	Edmondson-Westside HS	6 ft 3.5 in (1.92 m)	224 lb (102 kg)	4.85	Jul 17, 2008
David Mackall; DE/LB	Recruit ratings: Scout: Rivals: (N/A)					
Avery Graham; RB	Clarksburg, MD	Clarksburg HS	5 ft 10 in (1.78 m)	185 lb (84 kg)	4.48	Apr 5, 2008
Avery Graham; RB	Recruit ratings: Scout: Rivals: (76)					
Cody Blue; DT	Fork Union, VA	Fork Union Military Academy	6 ft 3 in (1.91 m)	295 lb (134 kg)	–	Sep 25, 2008
Cody Blue; DT	Recruit ratings: Scout: Rivals: (74)					
Zachariah Kerr; DT	Fork Union, VA	Fork Union Military Academy	6 ft 3 in (1.91 m)	295 lb (134 kg)	–	Sep 25, 2008
Zachariah Kerr; DT	Recruit ratings: Scout: Rivals: (78)					
Nick Ferrara; K	Melville, NY	St. Anthony's HS	6 ft 1 in (1.85 m)	195 lb (88 kg)	–	Jun 26, 2008
Nick Ferrara; K	Recruit ratings: Scout: Rivals: (74)					
Bradley Johnson; WLB	Dinwiddie, VA	Dinwiddie County HS	6 ft 2 in (1.88 m)	215 lb (98 kg)	–	Jun 26, 2008
Bradley Johnson; WLB	Recruit ratings: Scout: Rivals: (74)					
Ryan Donohue; MLB	Montvale, NJ	St. Joseph Regional HS	6 ft 2 in (1.88 m)	215 lb (98 kg)	–	Jun 26, 2008
Ryan Donohue; MLB	Recruit ratings: Scout: Rivals: (72)					
Marcus Whitfield; SLB	Germantown, MD	Northwest HS	6 ft 3.5 in (1.92 m)	215 lb (98 kg)	–	Jun 28, 2008
Marcus Whitfield; SLB	Recruit ratings: Scout: Rivals: (N/A)					
Isaiah Ross; MLB	Greenbelt, MD	Eleanor Roosevelt HS	6 ft 1 in (1.85 m)	235 lb (107 kg)	4.71	Aug 4, 2008
Isaiah Ross; MLB	Recruit ratings: Scout: Rivals: (73)					
Eric Franklin; S	Baltimore, MD	Archbishop Curley HS	6 ft 2 in (1.88 m)	190 lb (86 kg)	–	Jun 9, 2008
Eric Franklin; S	Recruit ratings: Scout: Rivals: (75)					
Justin Anderson; DE	Blythewood, SC	Blythewood HS	6 ft 5 in (1.96 m)	258 lb (117 kg)	5.16	Nov 29, 2008
Justin Anderson; DE	Recruit ratings: Scout: Rivals: (74)					
Dexter McDougle; DB	Falmouth, VA	Stafford HS	6 ft 1 in (1.85 m)	180 lb (82 kg)	4.5	Dec 21, 2008
Dexter McDougle; DB	Recruit ratings: Scout: Rivals: (80)					
Nick Klemm; OT	Marietta, GA	Wheeler HS	6 ft 6 in (1.98 m)	280 lb (130 kg)	N/A	Feb 4, 2009
Nick Klemm; OT	Recruit ratings: Scout: Rivals: (N/A)					
Bennett Fulper; OG	Gretna, VA	Gretna SHS	6 ft 4 in (1.93 m)	285 lb (129 kg)	N/A	Dec 29, 2008
Bennett Fulper; OG	Recruit ratings: Scout: Rivals: (N/A)					
Overall recruit ranking: Scout: 19 Rivals: 25
‡ Refers to 40-yard dash; Note: In many cases, Scout, Rivals, 247Sports, On3, and ESPN may conflict in their listings of height, weight and 40 time.; In these cases, the average was taken. ESPN grades are on a 100-point scale.; Sources: "Maryland Commit List for 2009". Rivals.; "Scout.com Football Recruiting: Maryland". Scout.; "RecruitTracker 2008: Maryland". ESPN.; "Scout.com Team Recruiting Rankings". Scout.; "2009 Team Ranking". Rivals.com.

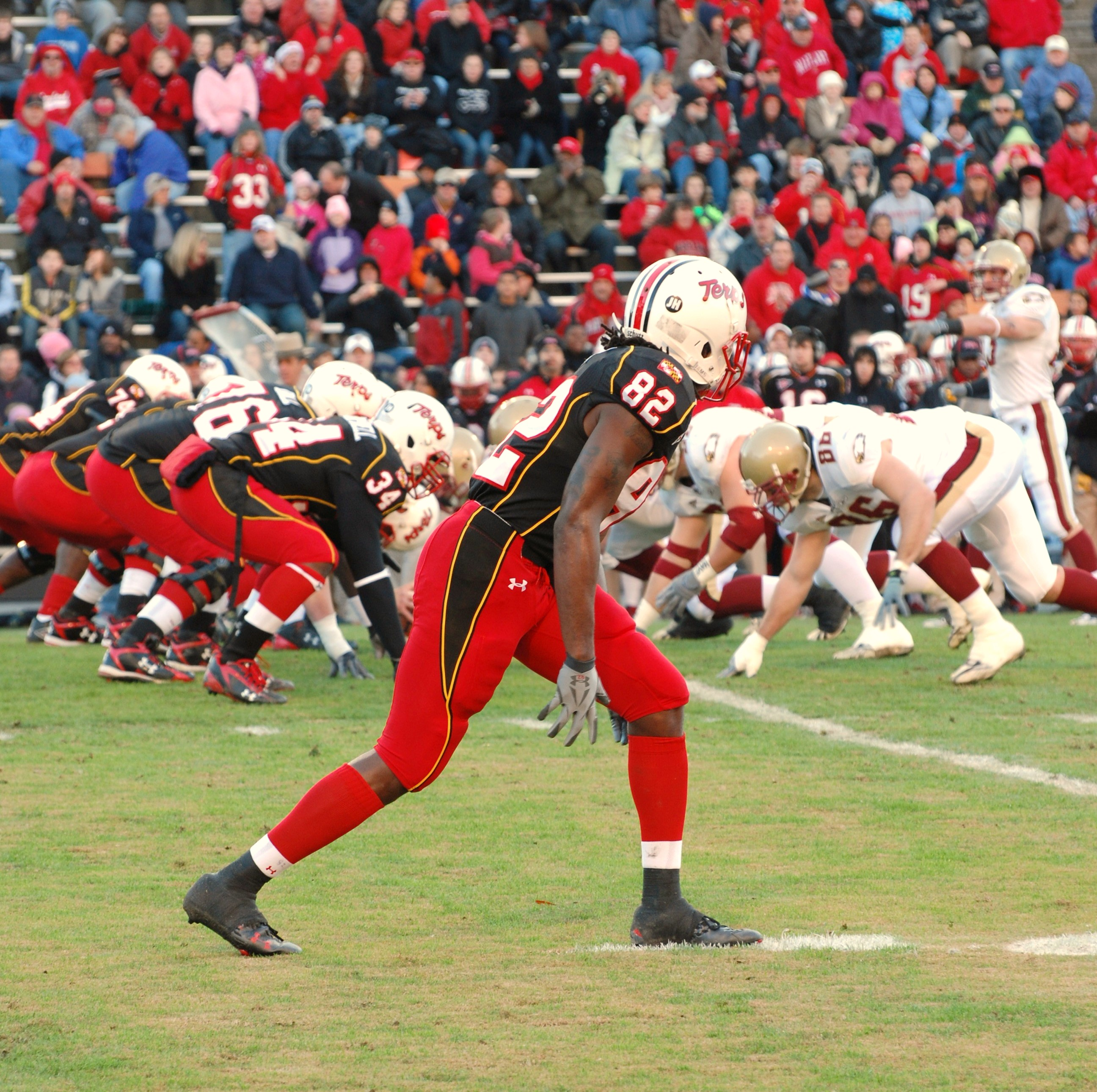
Torrey Smith lines up to play Boston College.

== Schedule ==
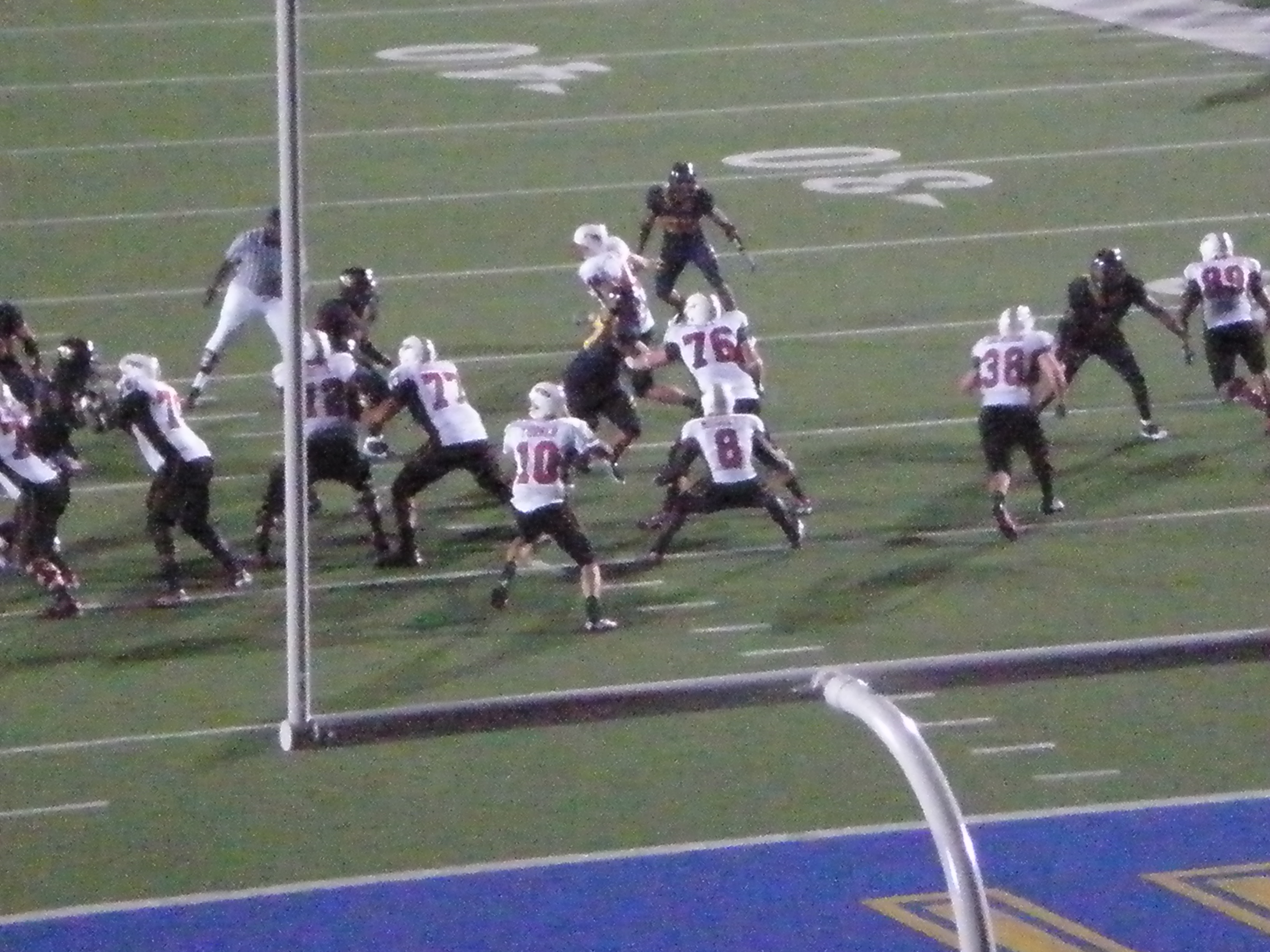
Chris Turner in the pocket against California.

In the preseason, the Terrapins were predicted to finish last (sixth) in the ACC Atlantic Division by both Athlon Sports and Phil Steele's, and The Sporting News forecast a fifth-place divisional finish for the Terps. Athlon also ranked Maryland as 57th out of the 120 Division I FBS teams.

Maryland began the 2009 season with the second game of the home-and-home series at California. In Week 2, they faced James Madison, which in 2008 advanced to the Division I FCS semi-finals. Two more home games, a rematch from 2008 against Middle Tennessee and a game against Rutgers, rounded out Maryland's non-conference schedule.

On October 5, 2009, Jack Heise, an influential alumni booster and avid Terrapins fan nicknamed "Mr. Maryland", died of a cerebral hemorrhage. The football team honored his memory by wearing Heise's initials on their helmets for the remainder of the 2009 season.

Date	Time	Opponent	Site	TV	Result	Attendance	Source
September 5	10:00 pm	at No. 12 California*	California Memorial Stadium; Berkeley, CA	ESPN2	L 13–52	62,367	
September 12	6:00 pm	James Madison*	Byrd Stadium; College Park, MD	ESPN360	W 38–35 ^{OT}	46,485	
September 19	3:30 pm	Middle Tennessee*	Byrd Stadium; College Park, MD	ESPN360	L 31–32	43,167	
September 26	3:30 pm	Rutgers*	Byrd Stadium; College Park, MD	ESPN360	L 13–34	43,848	
October 3	12:00 pm	Clemson	Byrd Stadium; College Park, MD	ESPNU	W 24–21	46,243	
October 10	6:30 pm	at Wake Forest	BB&T Field; Winston-Salem, NC	ESPN360	L 32–42	32,780	
October 17	4:00 pm	Virginia	Byrd Stadium; College Park, MD (rivalry)	ESPNU	L 9–20	44,864	
October 24	1:30 pm	at Duke	Wallace Wade Stadium; Durham, NC	ESPN360	L 13–17	24,650	
November 7	1:00 pm	at NC State	Carter–Finley Stadium; Raleigh, NC	ESPN360	L 31–38	55,631	
November 14	1:00 pm	No. 20 Virginia Tech	Byrd Stadium; College Park, MD	ESPN360	L 9–36	51,514	
November 21	12:00 pm	at Florida State	Doak Campbell Stadium; Tallahassee, FL	ACCN	L 26–29	66,042	
November 28	3:30 pm	Boston College	Byrd Stadium; College Park, MD	ESPNU	L 17–19	35,042	
*Non-conference game; Rankings from AP Poll released prior to the game; All times are in Eastern time

== Awards ==
=== All-America honors ===
- Nick Ferrara, PK, Phil Steele Publications freshman All-America second team
- A. J. Francis, DL, College Football News freshman All-America honorable mention

=== All-conference honors ===
- R. J. Dill, OL, Rivals.com freshman All-ACC team
- Nick Ferrara, PK, Rivals.com freshman All-ACC team
- Nick Ferrara, PK, The Sporting News freshman All-ACC team
- A. J. Francis, DL, The Sporting News freshman All-ACC team
- Demetrius Hartsfield, LB, Rivals.com freshman All-ACC team
- Torrey Smith, WR, All-ACC first team (as wide receiver)
- Torrey Smith, WR, All-ACC second team (as specialist)
- Torrey Smith, WR, Phil Steele Publications All-ACC first team (as wide receiver)
- Torrey Smith, WR, The Sporting News All-ACC first team (as wide receiver)
- Torrey Smith, WR, Phil Steele Publications All-ACC second team (as kick returner)
- Alex Wujciak, LB, All-ACC second team
- Alex Wujciak, LB, College Football News All-ACC first team
- Alex Wujciak, LB, Phil Steele Publications All-ACC first team

=== Players of the week ===
- Demetrius Hartsfield, LB, AT&T ESPN All-America Player of the Week Award nominee, October 2, 2009
- Demetrius Hartsfield, LB, ACC Freshman of the Week, October 2, 2009
- Nick Ferrara, PK, ACC Co-Specialist of the Week, October 2, 2009
- Torrey Smith, WR, ACC Specialist of the Week, October 9, 2009
- Torrey Smith, WR, ACC Specialist of the Week, November 6, 2009

=== Watch lists ===
- Travis Baltz, Ray Guy Award watch list
- Da'Rel Scott, Doak Walker Award watch list
- Da'Rel Scott, Maxwell Award watch list
- Chris Turner, Johnny Unitas Award watch list
- Alex Wujciak, Bronko Nagurski Trophy watch list
- Alex Wujciak, Chuck Bednarik Award watch list
- Alex Wujciak, Lombardi Award watch list
