= 1954 Maryland gubernatorial election =

- November 2, 1954
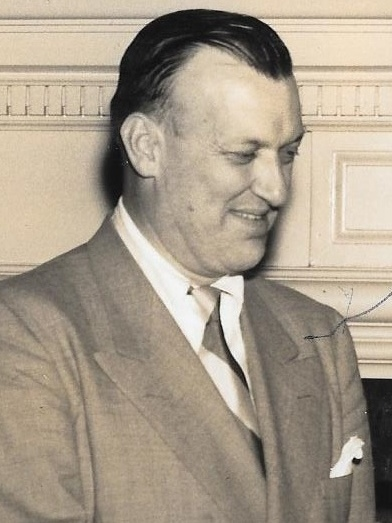

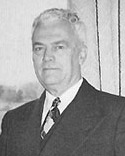
Nominee	Theodore McKeldin	Curley Byrd
Party	Republican	Democratic
Popular vote	381,451	319,033
Percentage	54.46%	45.54%
- County results McKeldin: 50–60% 60–70% Byrd: 50–60% 60–70%
Governor before election
Theodore McKeldin
Republican
Elected Governor
Theodore McKeldin
Republican

The 1954 Maryland gubernatorial election was held on November 2, 1954. Incumbent Republican Theodore McKeldin defeated Democratic nominee Curley Byrd with 54.46% of the vote.

This was the first time that a Republican was re-elected to a second consecutive term as governor of Maryland, and this would not occur again until 2018 when Larry Hogan won re-election.

== Primary elections ==
Primary elections were held on June 28, 1954.

=== Democratic primary ===
==== Candidates ====
- Curley Byrd, former President of the University of Maryland
- George P. Mahoney, perennial candidate

==== Results ====
Democratic primary results
Party	Candidate	Votes	%
Democratic	Curley Byrd	163,324	50.64
Democratic	George P. Mahoney	159,230	49.37
Total votes		322,554	100.00

== General election ==
=== Candidates ===
- Theodore McKeldin, Republican
- Curley Byrd, Democratic

=== Results ===
1954 Maryland gubernatorial election
Party	Candidate	Votes	%	±%
Republican	Theodore McKeldin (incumbent)	381,451	54.46%	
Democratic	Curley Byrd	319,033	45.54%	
Majority		62,418		
Turnout		700,484		
Republican hold		Swing		
