= Alex Wujciak =

American football player (born 1988)

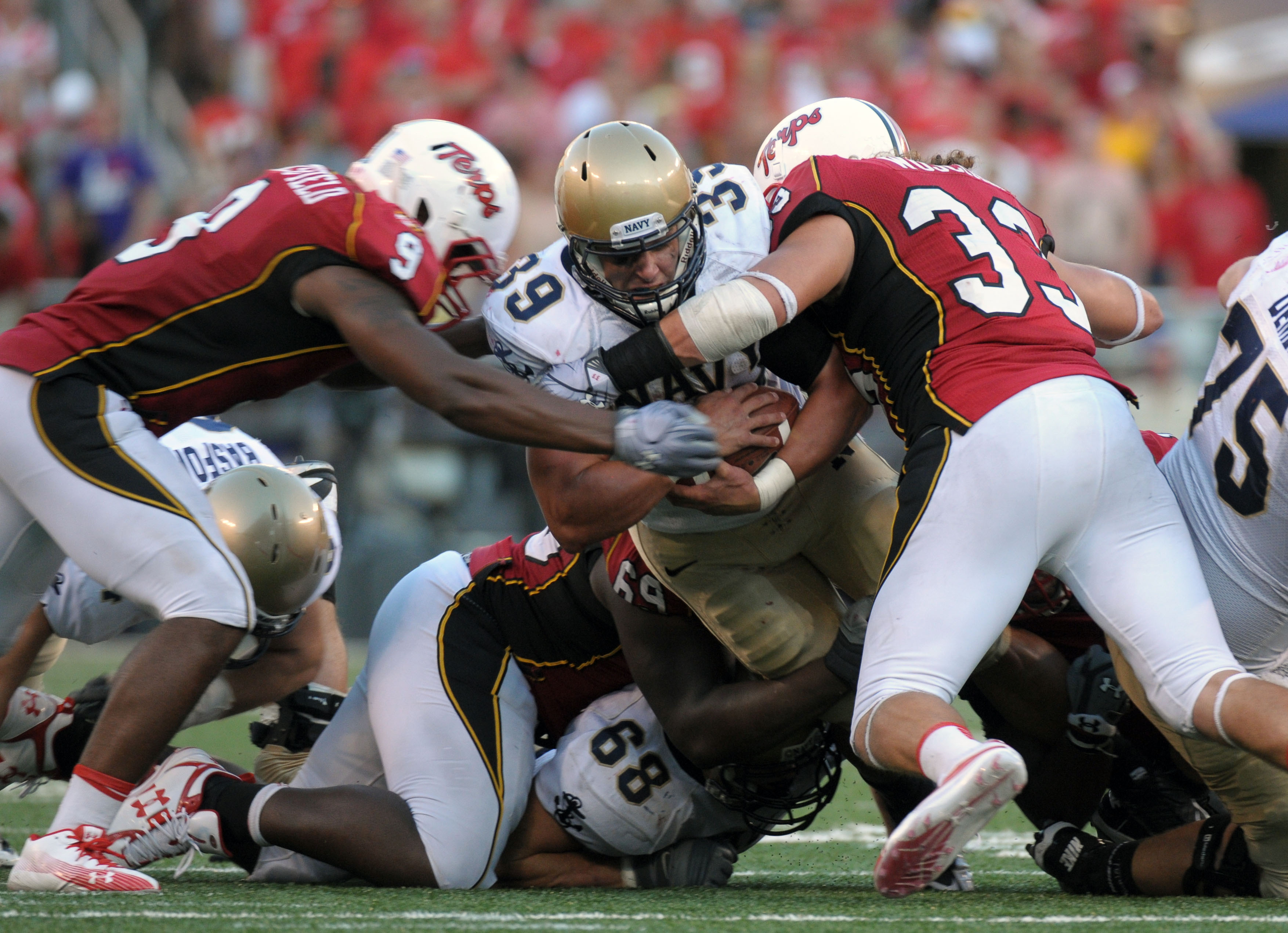
- Wujciak (right) tackles a Navy player

No. 33
- Position: Linebacker

Personal information
- Born: April 15, 1988 (age 38); West Caldwell, New Jersey, U.S.
- Listed height: 6 ft 3 in (1.91 m)
- Listed weight: 235 lb (107 kg)

Career information
- College: Maryland
- NFL draft: 2011: undrafted

Career history
- Cleveland Browns (2011)*
- * Offseason or practice squad member only

Awards and highlights
- 2× First-team All-ACC (2009, 2010); Second-team All-ACC (2008)

Alex Wujciak (/ˈwoʊdʒæk/ WOH-jak; born April 15, 1988) is an American former football linebacker. He was signed by the Browns as an undrafted free agent in 2011. He played college football at Maryland.

== Early life ==
Wujciak was born on April 15, 1988, to Alan and Erin Wujciak in West Caldwell, New Jersey. His father, Alan Wujciak (pictured here as#66), played as an offensive guard at Notre Dame, including as part of the 1973 national championship team. 2 years later, he was pictured alongside Daniel "Rudy" Ruettiger in a photo taken during the Georgia Tech game, the only game that Ruettiger dressed for and played in. Alex Wujciak attended Seton Hall Preparatory School in West Orange, New Jersey, where he was a four-year letterwinner playing football at linebacker, tight end, and punter. During his junior year in 2004, he recorded 145 tackles, five sacks, and one interception, and 23 pass receptions for 450 yards and three touchdowns. In 2005, he was named the New Jersey Defensive Player of the Year and an Associated Press and The Star Ledger first-team all-state player. ESPN.com assessed him as the 17th-ranked, and Rivals.com assessed him as the 24th-ranked prospective college linebacker in the nation.

Wujciak was considered one of the top inside linebacker prospects of 2006. As such, he was heavily recruited by several major colleges and received offers from Maryland, Michigan State, Nebraska, Rutgers, Wisconsin, and Louisville. His mother, Erin Wujciak, said that Alex chose Maryland because he believed that head coach Ralph Friedgen and recruiting coordinator Dave Sollazzo were "straight shooters" and did not make unrealistic promises about playing time.

== College career ==
Wujciak sat out the 2006 season as a redshirt. In 2007, he suffered a partial tear of the anterior cruciate ligament in summer training camp which caused him to miss the entire subsequent season. According to Maryland head coach Ralph Friedgen, as a redshirt freshman, Wujciak had been a serious competitor for a starting position. Friedgen said that "[Wujciak's injury] is a big blow for us right now."

In 2008, Wujciak started in all 13 games and was the leading tackler for Maryland. He recorded a total of 133 tackles, including 56 solo and 8.5 for a loss of 26 yards, and 1.5 sacks for 9 yards. He also broke up two passes, recovered a fumble, and blocked a kick. He finished the season second in the Atlantic Coast Conference (ACC) and 13th in the nation in tackles. Wujciak received second-team All-ACC honors, and he was named the team's defensive MVP.

After the 2008 season, Wujciak underwent knee surgery which caused him to miss spring practice, but he was able to recuperate by the start of the 2009 season. In the spring of 2009, College Football News named him as one of their "120 Players to Know" for the upcoming season, and wrote that "he craves contact and plays with a no-quit, blue-collar mentality ... He flows nicely to the ball, will shed blockers, and rarely misses a tackle." Prior to the 2009 season, he was named to the preseason All-ACC team. Wujciak was included on the Chuck Bednarik Award, Bronko Nagurski Trophy, and Lombardi Award watch lists.

Before the 2010 season, Scout.com included him at number-33 among its Top 100 Players.

== Professional career ==
Wujciak was signed by the Cleveland Browns as an undrafted free agent following the 2011 NFL draft on July 26, 2011. He was waived on August 4, 2011.

== Personal life ==
After his football career Wujciak went on to become a trooper with the New Jersey State Police.
