= Duke Wyre =

American athletic trainer and coach (1906–1968)

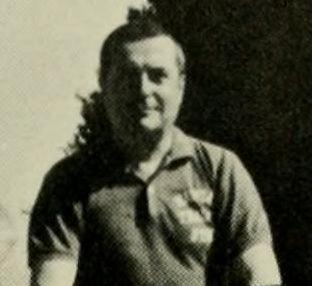
- Wyre in Maryland in 1961
- Born: Alfred J. Wyre; September 26, 1906
- Died: April 1, 1968 (aged 61); Cheverly, Maryland, USA
- Occupation(s): Athletic trainer, coach
- Known for: Duke Wyre Shoulder Vest

Alfred J. "Duke" Wyre (September 26, 1906 – April 1, 1968) was an American athletic trainer and coach. He invented the Duke Wyre Shoulder Vest, a protective device for football players against shoulder dislocations and separations. Wyre was an athletic trainer at the College of the Holy Cross for one year and at Yale University for 15 years. From 1947 to 1967, he was the head trainer at the University of Maryland. He was a trainer for the United States Naval Academy team during the 1960 Summer Olympics held in Rome.

Wyre was hospitalized in Prince George's County Hospital in Maryland for a stomach illness in March 1968. While there, he suffered a fatal heart attack on April 1, 1968, at the age of 61. Wyre was inducted into the Helms Athletic Foundation Hall of Fame in 1961, the National Athletic Trainers' Association Hall of Fame in 1966, and the University of Maryland Athletic Hall of Fame in 1994.
