= 1936 All-Southern Conference football team =

College football honor

The 1936 All-Southern Conference football team consists of American football players chosen by the Associated Press (AP) and United Press (UP) for the All-Southern Conference football team for the 1936 college football season.

== All-Southern Conference selections ==
=== Quarterbacks ===
- Ace Parker, Duke (AP-1; UP-1)
- Teeny Lafferty, Davidson (AP-2)

=== Halfbacks ===
- Bill Guckeyson, Maryland (AP-1; UP-1)
- Honey Hackney, Duke (AP-1; UP-2)
- Eric Tipton, Duke (AP-3; UP-1)
- Raleigh "Hobo" Daniel, Wake Forest (AP-2; UP-2)
- Joe Ryneska, NC State (AP-2; UP-2)
- Mac Folger, Clemson (AP-2)
- Tom Burnette, North Carolina (AP-3; UP-2)
- Andy Trzeciak, VMI (AP-3)
- Joe Berry, Clemson (AP-3)

=== Fullbacks ===
- Jim Hutchins, North Carolina (AP-1; UP-1)

=== Ends ===
- Andy Bershak, North Carolina (AP-1; UP-1)
- Bob King, Furman (AP-1; UP-1)
- Dick Buck, North Carolina (AP-2; UP-2)
- Vic Willis, Maryland (AP-2)
- Llana, Duke (AP-3)
- Mac Cara, NC State (AP-3; UP-2)
- Richard Taliaferro, Duke (AP-3)

=== Tackles ===
- Joe Brunansky, Duke (AP-1; UP-1)
- Joe Cardwell, Duke (AP-1)
- John Trimpey, North Carolina (AP-2; UP-1)
- Manuel Black, Clemson (AP-2; UP-2)
- Hank Bartos, North Carolina (AP-3; UP-2)
- Mason Bugg, NC State (AP-3)

=== Guards ===
- Jim Farley, VMI (AP-1; UP-1)
- Dick Johnston, Davidson (AP-1; UP-2)
- Duane Berry, Washington & Lee (AP-2; UP-1)
- Woodrow Lipscomb, Duke (AP-2)
- Paul Gaffney, South Carolina (AP-3; UP-2)
- Alex Regdon, NC State (AP-3)

=== Centers ===
- Dan Hill, Duke (AP-1; UP-1)
- Harold Lewis, Clemson (AP-2)
- Dave Jones, VPI (AP-3; UP-2)

== Key ==
AP = Associated Press

UP = United Press

== See also ==
- 1936 College Football All-America Team
