= Jack Heise =

American lawyer

Heise seated in Cole Field House

John Irvin "Jack" Heise, Jr. (pronounced HI-zee; December 13, 1924 – October 5, 2009) was an important benefactor of the University of Maryland. His dedication to Terrapins sports earned him the nickname "Mr. Maryland".

== Early life ==
Heise was born on December 13, 1924, in Baltimore, Maryland, and attended Baltimore City College. He then went on to the University of Maryland starting in 1941, before he put his education on hold to serve in the Second World War. He served in the United States Army Air Forces as a B-24 pilot over Europe. After the war, he returned to Maryland, where he played on the lacrosse team. As an undergraduate, he was also the manager of the basketball team. He was a member of the Sigma Chi fraternity, which later honored him with its Significant Sig Award.

Heise graduated from Maryland in 1947, and then attended law school at the University of Virginia, from which he graduated in 1950. In 1949, Heise married Jacqueline née Morley, whom he had met while she was a cheerleader at Maryland.

== Professional career ==
Heise worked as a trial attorney for the Justice Department, and in the 1950s, entered private practice. In 1970, he became a principal partner in the Heise, Jorgenson, & Stefanelli law firm in Gaithersburg, Maryland, which specializes in government claims and commercial law. Heise worked there until his death.

== Maryland fanhood ==
Over a 60-year period, Heise attended almost every home and road Maryland football and basketball game, and his avid fanhood earned him the nickname "Mr. Maryland". From 1946 to 2009, he attended all but two Atlantic Coast Conference basketball tournaments, and when Maryland was a member of the league, Southern Conference tournaments. After each game, Heise sent handwritten notes to the teams' coaches. He often attended games with columnist Robert Novak, another avid Maryland sports fan. Maryland football coach Ralph Friedgen called Heise "really one of the all-time supporters of Maryland athletics." The Baltimore Sun wrote, "In an era in which other schools' boosters often become best known for trying to unseat struggling coaches, Mr. Heise was relentlessly positive."

Heise served as president of the Terrapin Club and the M Club, the university's two main booster groups. He donated significant contributions to the school and was a member of the Terrapin Club Lifetime Giving Society for donors of at least $250,000. Heise was one of the top donors to the university's athletic program. In 2007, the University of Maryland Athletic Hall of Fame inducted him for meritorious service. Heise was the first inductee in that category.

He died of a cerebral hemorrhage on October 5, 2009, at his home in Bethesda, Maryland. He was 84 years of age. After his death, the football team honored his memory by wearing Heise's initials on their helmets for the remainder of the 2009 season.
