= Boze Berger =

American baseball player (1910–1992)

- Infielder
- Born: May 13, 1910; Baltimore, Maryland, U.S.
- Died: November 3, 1992 (aged 82); Bethesda, Maryland, U.S.
- Batted: Right Threw: Right

MLB debut
- August 17, 1932, for the Cleveland Indians

Last MLB appearance
- September 30, 1939, for the Boston Red Sox

MLB statistics
- Batting average: .236
- Home runs: 13
- Runs batted in: 97
- Stats at Baseball Reference

Teams
- Cleveland Indians (1932, 1935–1936); Chicago White Sox (1937–1938); Boston Red Sox (1939)

Louis William "Boze" Berger (May 13, 1910 – November 3, 1992) was an American professional baseball infielder who played in Major League Baseball (MLB) during the 1930s, for the Cleveland Indians, Chicago White Sox and Boston Red Sox.

== Biography ==
He was born in Baltimore, Maryland, and was also a two-time All-American forward for the University of Maryland basketball team from 1929 to 1932, where he led the Southern Conference in scoring in 1931 with 19.1 points per game. His #6 jersey has been honored by the university, and he was inducted into the University of Maryland Athletic Hall of Fame in 1982.

In a six-season career, Berger was a .236 hitter with 13 home runs and 97 RBI in 343 games played. 1935 was his best season in baseball, achieving career-highs in hits (119), doubles (27), triples (5), runs (62), RBI (43) and games played (124).

Berger died in Bethesda, Maryland, at the age of 82.
