= Joe Cardwell =

American football player (1912–1957)

Profile
- Positions: Tackle, guard

Personal information
- Born: January 31, 1912; Montgomery, Alabama, U.S.
- Died: July 6, 1957 (aged 45); Norfolk, Virginia, U.S.

Career information
- College: Duke University

Career history
- 1937–1938: Pittsburgh Steelers

Awards and highlights
- First-team All-SoCon (1936)
- Stats at Pro Football Reference

Joseph Thomas Cardwell (January 31, 1912 – July 6, 1957) was an American football player.

Cardwell was born in 1912 in Montgomery, Alabama. He attended Great Bridge High School in Chesapeake, Virginia, and then enrolled at Duke University. He played college football for the Duke Blue Devils football team from 1933 to 1936. He played guard on offense and tackle on defense for Duke and was selected by the Associated Press as a first-team tackle on the 1936 All-Southern Conference football team.

Cardwell also played professional football as a guard and tackle for the Pittsburgh Steelers during the 1937 and 1938 seasons. He appeared in a total of 18 games for the Steelers, 10 of them as a starter.

Cardwell later worked for the George T. McLean Construction Co. He later worked for the Richmond Sand and Gravel Corp. and the Gulf-Atlantic Transportation Corp. and eventually as the general manager of McAllister Bros. Hampton Roads tugboat operation. He died in 1957 at his home in Norfolk, Virginia, at age 45.
