= Andy Bershak =

American football and basketball player (1915–1943)

Profile
- Position: End

Personal information
- Born: November 8, 1915; Clairton, Pennsylvania, U.S.
- Died: November 19, 1943 (aged 28); Clairton, Pennsylvania, U.S.

Career information
- College: North Carolina (1936–1937)

Awards and highlights
- Consensus All-American (1937); Second-team All-American (1936); 2× First-team All-SoCon (1936, 1937)

Andrew A. Bershak (November 8, 1915 – November 19, 1943) was an American football player. He played college football at University of North Carolina at Chapel Hill and was a consensus selection at the end position on the 1937 College Football All-America Team. He was selected in the fifth round of the 1938 NFL draft by the Detroit Lions with the 36th overall pick. Bershak also played basketball at North Carolina and led both the basketball and football teams to Southern Conference championships.

Bershak later served as an assistant football coach and scout for North Carolina. He died in 1943 in Clairton, Pennsylvania.
