= Jim Kehoe =

- Kehoe as athletic director at Maryland

Biographical details
- Born: June 3, 1918; Bel Air, Maryland, U.S.
- Died: January 17, 2010 (aged 91); Prince Frederick, Maryland, U.S.

Playing career
- 1936–1940: Maryland
- Position: Middle distance runner

Coaching career (HC unless noted)
- 1946–1969: Maryland

Administrative career (AD unless noted)
- 1969–1978: Maryland
- 1979: Maryland Eastern Shore (consultant)
- 1980–1981: Maryland (interim AD)
- 1989–1990: Mount St. Mary's (consultant)

James Henry Kehoe Jr. (June 3, 1918 – January 17, 2010) was an American athletics coach and university administrator. He served as the athletic director at the University of Maryland from 1969 to 1978, during which time he was responsible for the hiring of future Hall of Fame coaches Lefty Driesell, Jerry Claiborne, Bud Beardmore, and Chris Weller.

== Early life and military service ==
Kehoe was born on June 3, 1918, in Bel Air, Maryland. In high school, he was a state champion runner. Kehoe enrolled at the University of Maryland in 1936 and competed in track and field, in which he excelled as a middle-distance runner. He set school records in the two-mile run and 880-yard run. He graduated from Maryland in 1940.

After college, Kehoe joined the United States Army and served in the Pacific during World War II.

== Professional career ==
After the war, he returned to the University of Maryland as its track and cross country coach in 1946. During his tenure, he built the programs into a national powerhouse and won multiple conference championships. When he retired from coaching, his track teams had a 27-meet winning streak and his cross country teams a 29-meet streak. Kehoe's teams had captured 48 cross country, indoor track, and outdoor track championships in the Southern Conference and Atlantic Coast Conference.

In 1969, Kehoe resigned from his coaching positions to take over as the university's athletic director with the task of turning around the struggling football and basketball programs. In his sixth week on the job, Kehoe hired Lefty Driesell as the new basketball coach, and said it was "a new era in athletics at the University of Maryland... top drawer, all the way and nothing less." Driesell, after he had promised to make Maryland the "UCLA of the East", helped form the basketball program into a perennial NCAA tournament contender.

In his first year, he also fired the head football coach, former Maryland star Bob Ward who was embroiled in a player revolt and had compiled a 2–17 record over two years. Kehoe took an unorthodox approach by hiring Roy Lester, a highly successful area high school coach, as Ward's replacement. The plan did not work, however, and after three years and a 7–25 record, Kehoe fired Lester as well. He stated his plans to make Maryland a "nationally ranked caliber team" and that the perennial losing and low attendance would make the athletic department unsustainable. Kehoe appointed Jerry Claiborne as Lester's successor, who reversed the team's fortunes and won three consecutive Atlantic Coast Conference championships in the 1970s.

Kehoe also brought successful non-revenue coaches to Maryland. In men's lacrosse, he hired Bud Beardmore, who won the 1973 and 1975 NCAA tournament championships. He also hired Chris Weller as the first Maryland women's basketball coach. Driesell, Claiborne, Beardmore, and Weller have all been inducted into their respective sports Halls of Fame.

With the help of his college track teammate Tom Fields as head fundraiser, Kehoe made the Maryland athletic program financially successful as well. Throughout his nine-year tenure, the athletic department recorded a profit each year, primarily through alumni donors and increased attendance rates.

As Title IX was being debated, Kehoe resisted expansion of the women's athletic programs, arguing that they do not generate any income to support themselves.

Kehoe resigned in 1978 after disagreements with university chancellor Robert Gluckstern. He then took a temporary athletic department post at the University of Maryland, Eastern Shore. He briefly returned to the Maryland post as interim athletic director in 1980 before retiring in 1981. In 1989, he was hired as a special consultant to the athletic department of Mount St. Mary's University, a position in which he remained for one year.

== Later life ==
Kehoe retired to Chesapeake Beach. In 1986, Kehoe was inducted into the University of Maryland Athletic Hall of Fame. In 1998, he was inducted into the U.S. Track & Field and Cross Country Coaches Association Hall of Fame. The Kehoe Track and Field Complex at the University of Maryland is named in his honor. Kehoe died of cardiovascular disease on January 17, 2010, at the Burnett-Calvert Hospice House in Prince Frederick, Maryland.
