= Memorial Chapel (University of Maryland) =

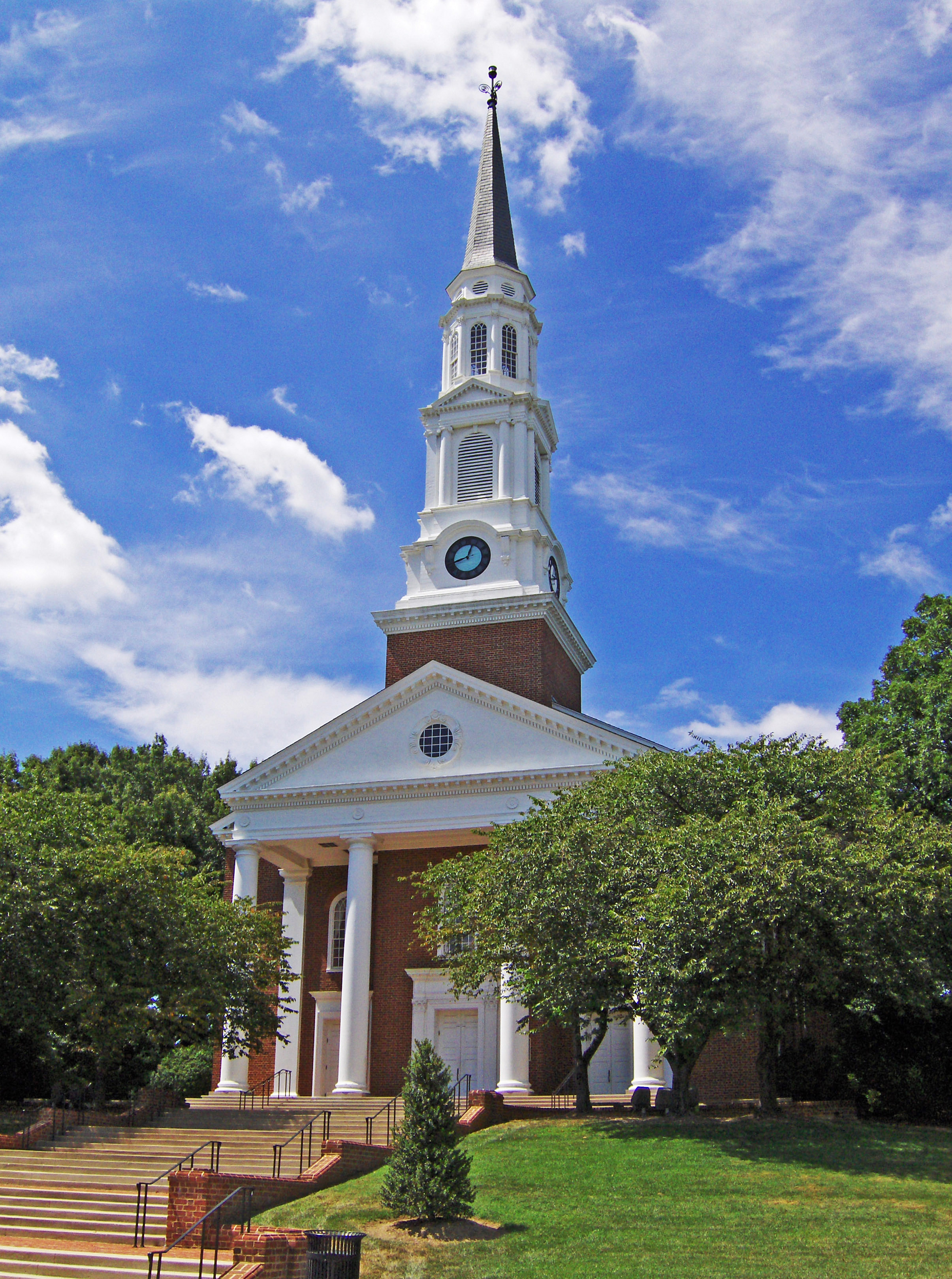
- A front view of Memorial Chapel in 2006
- Interactive map of the Memorial Chapel area

General information
- Status: The Chapel's steeple is the highest point on campus
- Type: Carillon
- Architectural style: Georgian
- Location: University of Maryland, 7744 Regents Drive, College Park, Maryland, United States
- Coordinates: 38°59′02″N 76°56′28″W
- Completed: 1952

Design and construction
- Architect: Henry Powell Hopkins

Website
- thestamp.umd.edu/memorial_chapel

Memorial Chapel is a non-denominational building on the campus of the University of Maryland, College Park, constructed to honor those associated with the university who had lost their lives serving in the United States Armed Forces. The building, designed by Henry Powell Hopkins, actually is made up of three chapels: the Main Chapel, the West Chapel, and the Chapel of the Blessed Sacrament. A Vietnam Veterans Memorial was constructed on the Chapel grounds in 1988. The steeple of the chapel is the highest point on campus.

== History ==
In 1946, the university's Board of Regents approved the construction of the chapel, after four students presented a petition of 1,348 signatures to the Board for the construction of an interdenominational place of worship on campus. In 1948, it was decided that the building would be dedicated to veterans of World War I and World War II. The building's dedication took place on October 12, 1952, with then-Maryland Governor Theodore McKeldin delivering the dedication address. Alumni donations led to a restoration in the 1980s, and the Class of 1997's Class Gift was a restoration of the chapel's West Courtyard.

For the first 40-plus years of the chapel's existence, the Memorial Chapel carillon rang out Maryland's state song, "Maryland, My Maryland." On April 21, 1999, however, the carillon began to play the University of Maryland alma mater "Hail! Alma Mater." The carillon has continued to chime out the alma mater before noon daily. The Class of 1992's Senior Class Gift was a refurbishment of the carillon.

== Usage ==
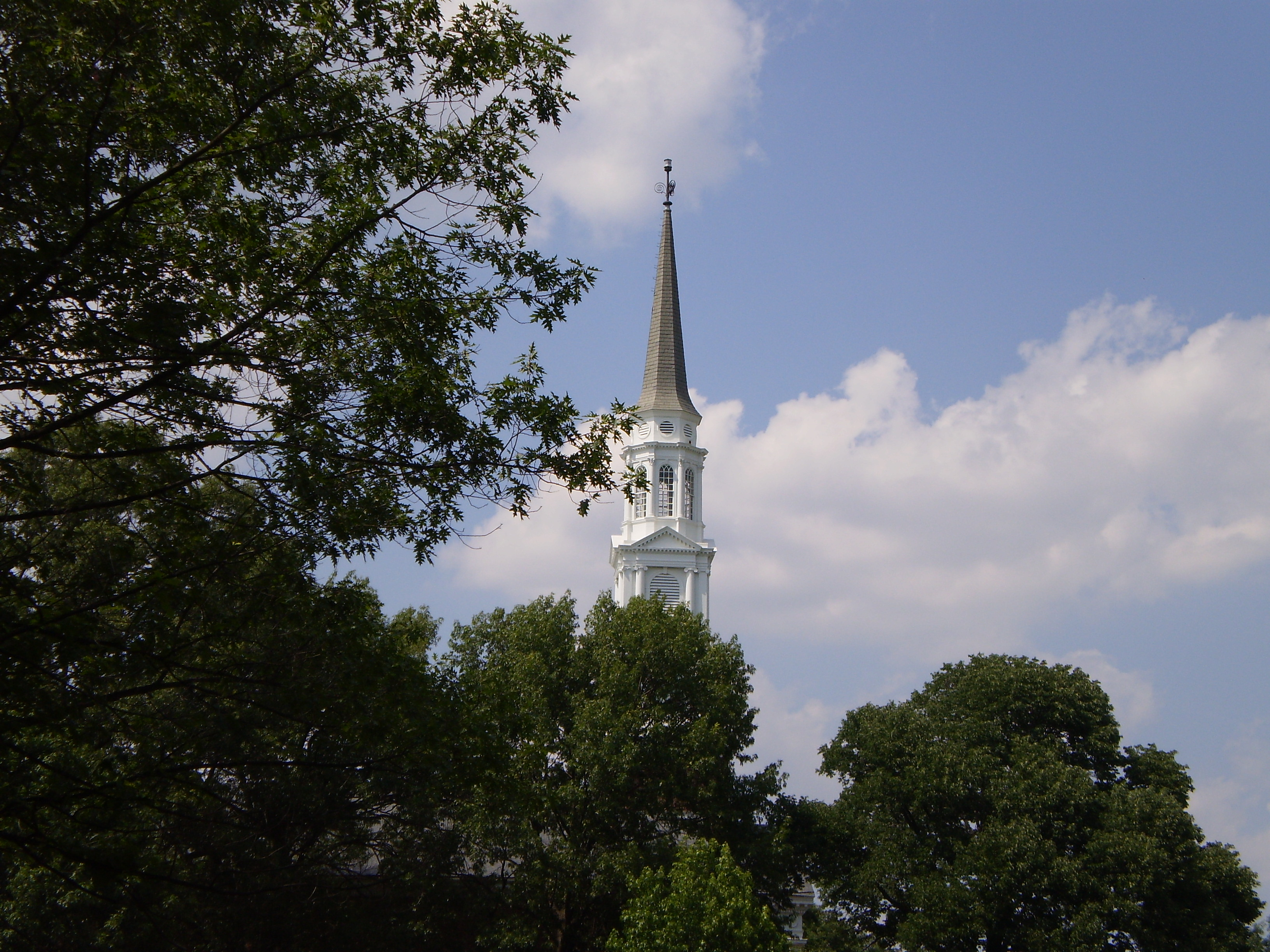
The iconic steeple of the chapel can be seen from all over campus and College Park.

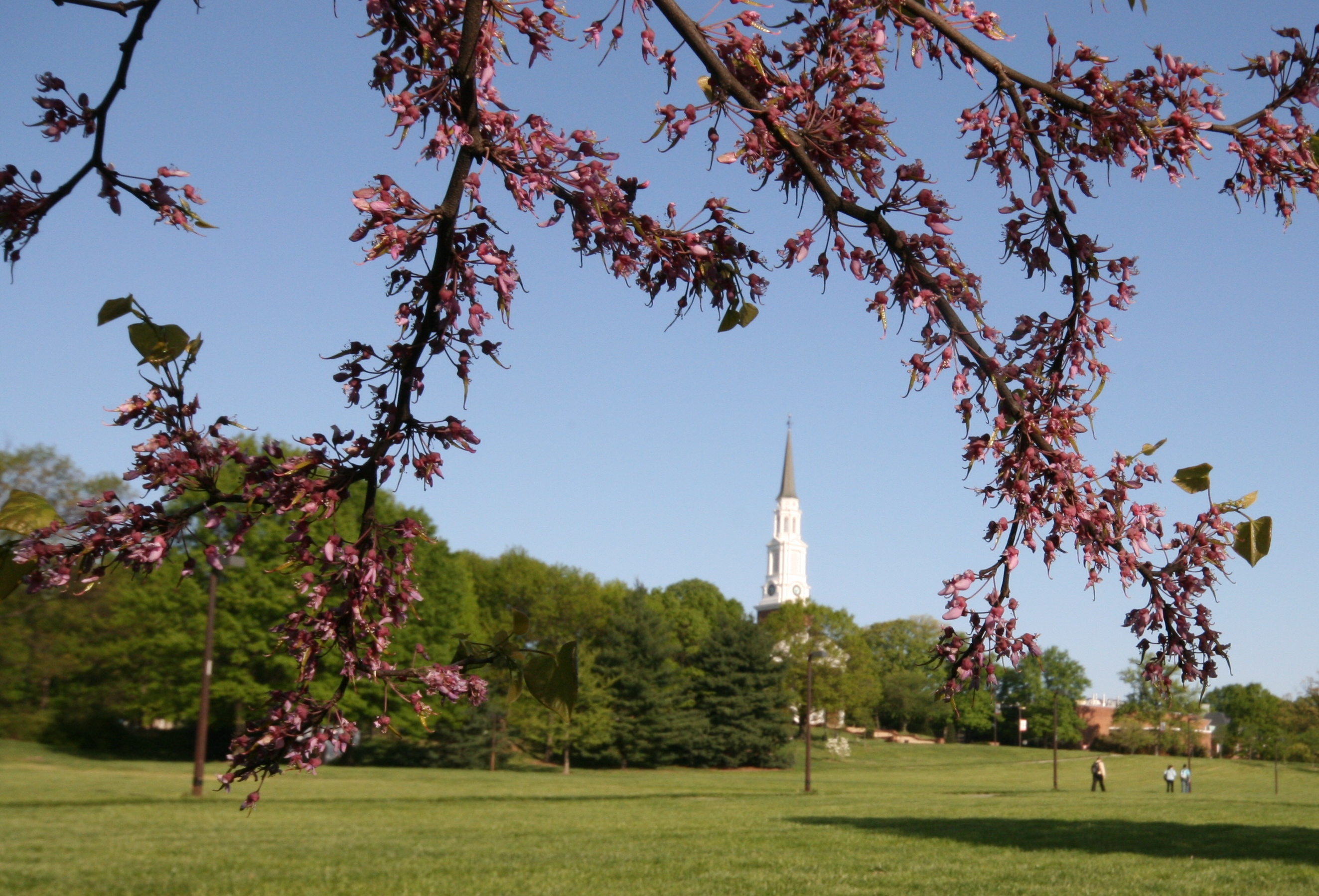
Cercis canadensis at Memorial Chapel on University of Maryland Arboretum & Botanical Garden

The Memorial Chapel attracts over 80,000 visitors each year, and hosts upwards of 1,200 events annually, including commencement ceremonies, concerts, convocations, lectures, and weddings. Weddings at the chapel are particularly popular among Maryland alumni and members of the university community, as 84% of the weddings that have taken place at the chapel had at least one connection to the university. Visitors of the Chapel include Speaker of the House Nancy Pelosi, Senator John McCain, Senator Joseph Tydings, and former Maryland Governor Robert Ehrlich. A Veterans Day ceremony is held at the Chapel annually.

The chapel is often used as place of remembrance and reflection by the university community, particularly in the aftermath of great tragedies; it has been an important meeting place and symbol during the Vietnam War, and in the wake of September 11, Challenger, Columbia, 2004 Tsunami, and Virginia Tech disasters.

== The Garden of Reflection and Remembrance ==
In 2007, following the September 11th and Virginia Tech tragedies, an initial grant was awarded to the Memorial Chapel to create a garden for reflection on the south side of the building for the university community. Among the features of the garden are a labyrinth and a walk of remembrance. The groundbreaking for the garden took place on May 25, 2010.
