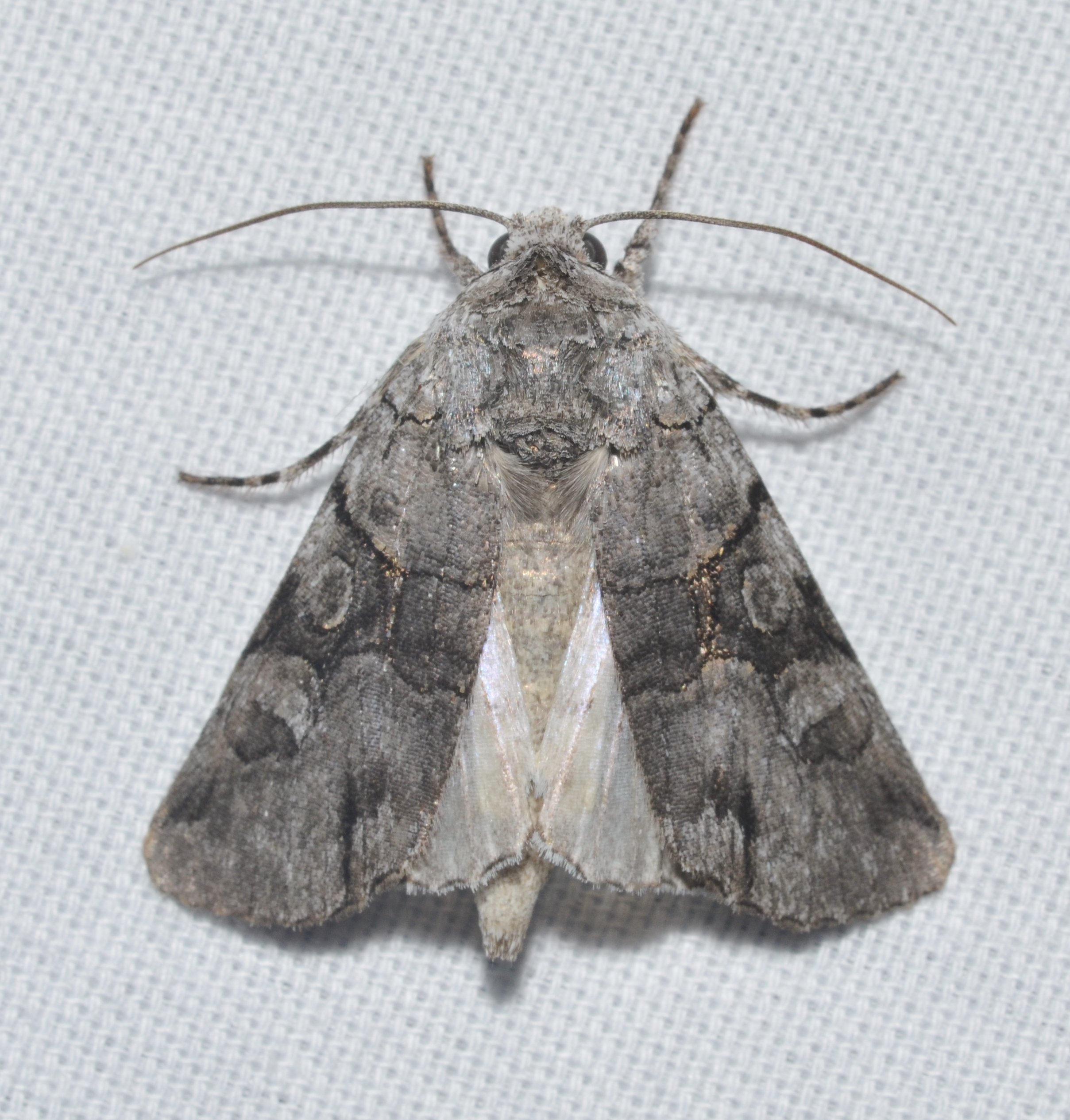

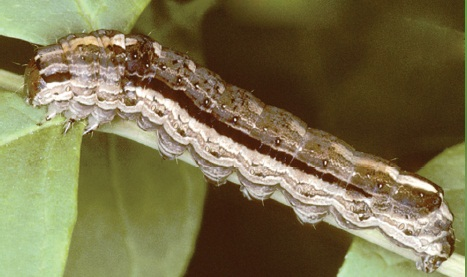
- Adult (top) and larva (bottom)

Scientific classification
- Kingdom: Animalia
- Phylum: Arthropoda
- Class: Insecta
- Order: Lepidoptera
- Superfamily: Noctuoidea
- Family: Noctuidae
- Genus: Sympistis
- Species: S. chionanthi

Binomial name
- Sympistis chionanthi (J. E. Smith, 1797)

Synonyms
- Adita chionanthi J. E. Smith, 1797

= Sympistis chionanthi =

Species of moth

Sympistis chionanthi, the grey o moth or fringe-tree sallow, is a moth of the family Noctuidae. The species was first described by James Edward Smith in 1797. It is found from North Dakota to Nova Scotia south to at least to Virginia and Kansas. The habitat consists of deciduous woodlands, including riparian woodlands, but also plantations and farmyard shelterbelts.

The wingspan is about 33–38 mm. Adults are on wing from August to October in one generation per year.

The larvae feed on Fraxinus and Chionanthus species (including Chionanthus virginicus) and possibly other Oleaceae species. Larvae can be found in May and June.
