= Adele H. Stamp Student Union =

Coordinates: 38.988°N 76.945°W

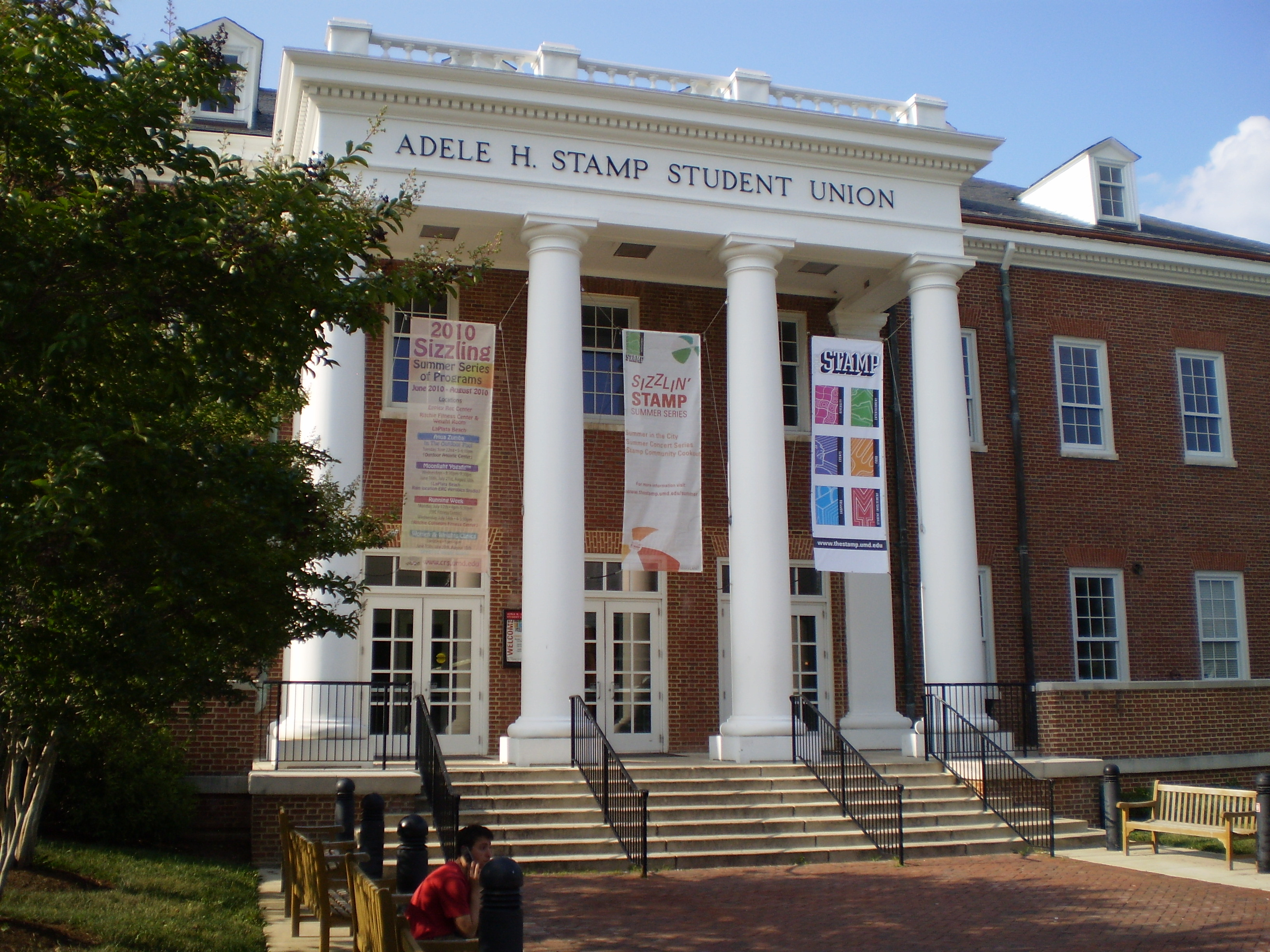
- Front entrance of the Adele H. Stamp Student Union "Center for Campus Life."

General information
- Type: Student activities center
- Architectural style: Georgian
- Location: Central campus on Campus Drive; University of Maryland, College Park campus
- Named for: Adele H. Stamp
- Completed: 1954

Website
- Stamp Website

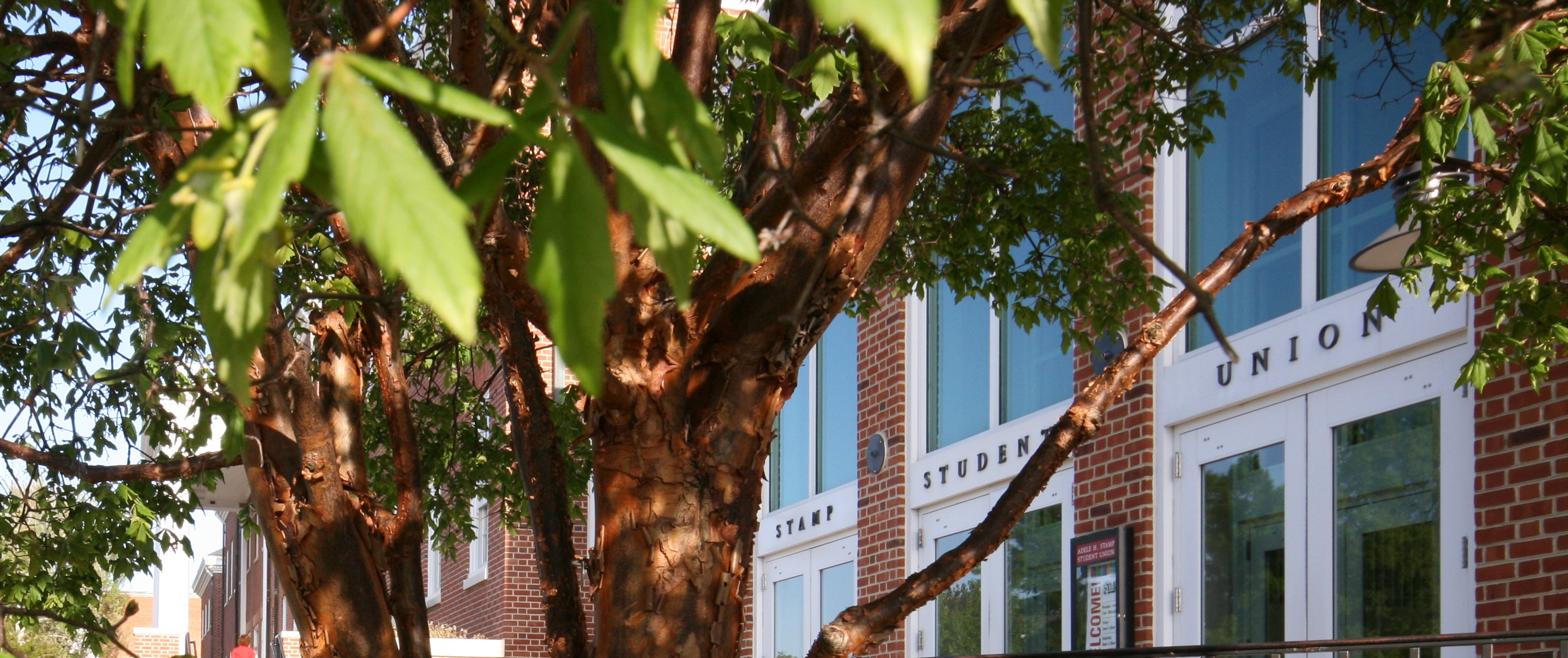
Acer griseum on the University of Maryland Arboretum & Botanical Garden with Stamp in the Background

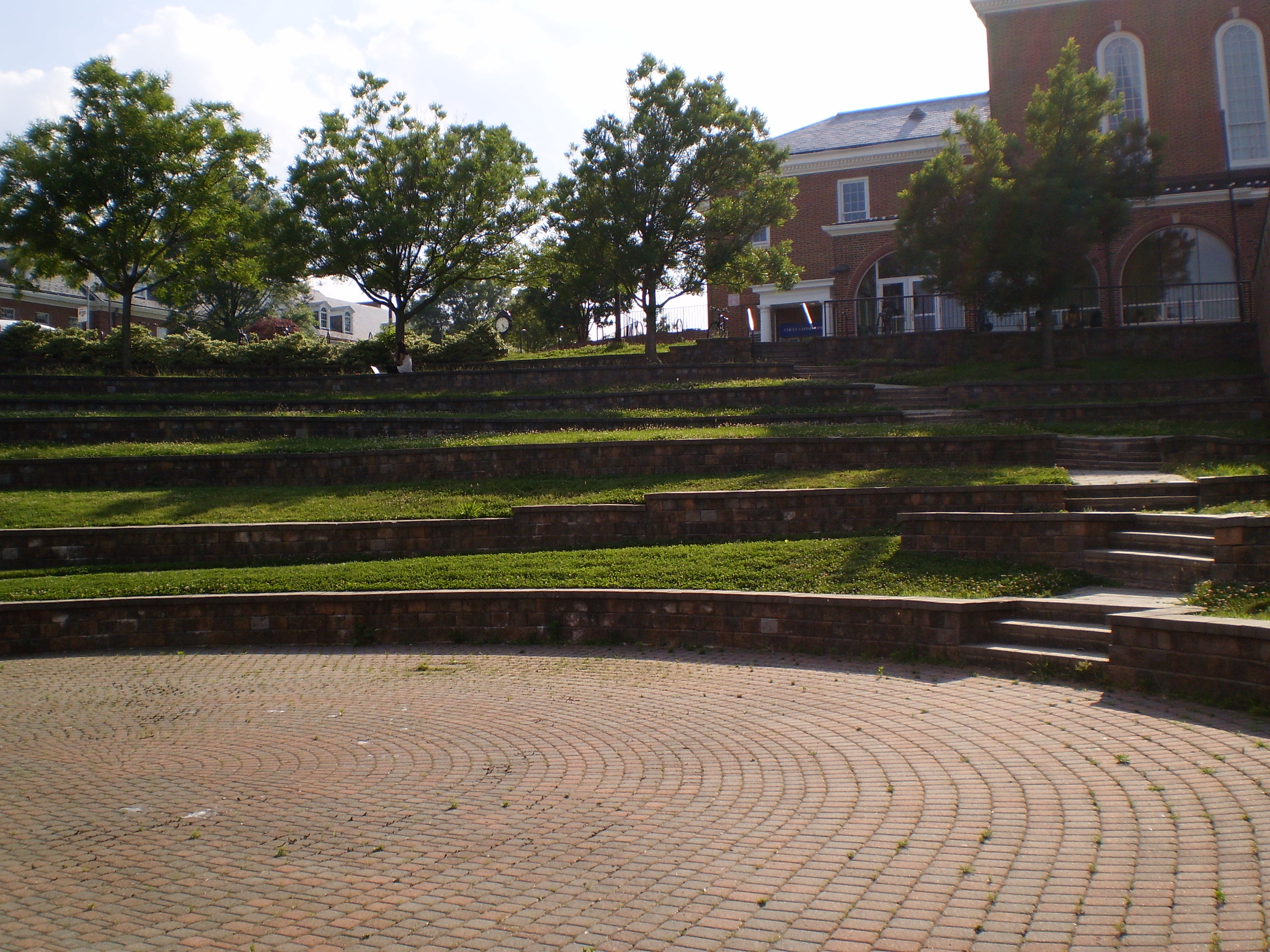
The Nyumburu Amphitheater hosts numerous outdoor performances, and is located immediately next to Stamp (seen in background).

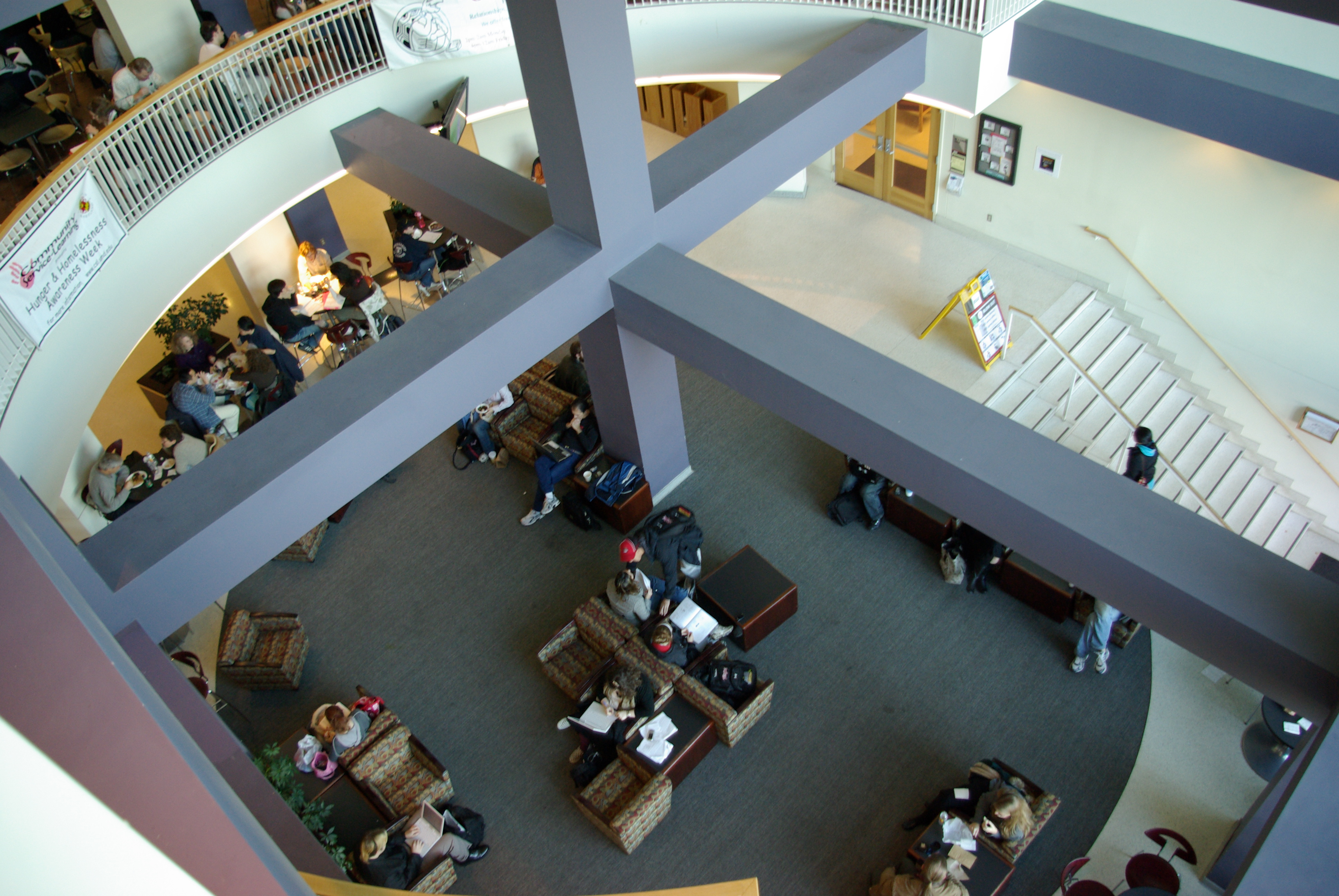
Atrium of Stamp Student Union, near the food court and co-op

The Adele H. Stamp Student Union, commonly referred to as "Stamp", is the student activity center on the campus of the University of Maryland, College Park. First constructed in 1954 (with additions in 1962 and 1971), the building was renamed in 1983 for Adele Hagner Stamp, who served as the university's dean of women from 1920 to 1960. Stamp houses nearly all of the university's student organizations, and is considered the "center of campus life," receiving more than 19,000 visitors daily.

== Shops ==
Shops in Stamp include the Union Shop, the University Book Center, a mailbox service, called Mailboxes, Etc., and the Terrapin Technology Store, which sells high-tech software and equipment.

== Entertainment ==
A movie theater, named the Hoff Theater, is located in Stamp. First opening in 1975 and renovated in 2002, the Hoff includes a seating capacity of 550, Dolby Digital surround sound, and a concession stand. The TerpZone, located in the Basement Level of Stamp, is an entertainment center that includes a bowling alley, billiard tables, an arcade, and projection screen televisions for viewing sporting events. The Art and Learning Center is located in the basement level by TerpZone and hosts student classes and activities such as dancing, ceramics and other arts and crafts. An art gallery, The Stamp Gallery, prominently presents exhibitions on the first floor of Stamp and controls work throughout the Stamp. Immediately next to Stamp is the Nyumburu Amphitheater, which often features outdoor performances of various sorts.

== Dining ==
Dining options in Stamp include a food court that houses a Chick-Fil-A, Hibachi San, Moby Dick: House of Kabob, Panda Express, Saladworks, and Qdoba. Additionally, a Subway is located in the TerpZone. The Maryland Food Collective, a not-for-profit, worker-owned business located in the Stamp basement, formerly offered organic, fair-trade food options, but closed in 2019. The Coffee Bar, located on the first floor of Stamp, brews Starbucks coffee, in addition to selling various soups and sandwiches. There is also a convenience store, The Union Shop. The Maryland Dairy, which uses milk from local cows and has specialty ice cream flavors for each coach, is located in Stamp.

== Technology ==
The Stamp also offers computer, web, and audio visual support. The technology services department provides support for the many departments at the Stamp. They also provide web hosting and web access to different student organizations. The technology services also provide audio visual support to student events in Stamp. These services include podcasting, media presentations, panel discussions, video editing and spam filters, conferencing, concerts, and more.

== Other services ==
The ground floor of Stamp has a State Employees Credit Union (SECU) ATM. Design and Copy Services provides copy and production services, and legal aid offices for both undergraduate and graduate students are present. The Student Organization Resource Center is located in the Student Involvement Suite on the first floor and is the center of student club life and resources.

== See also ==
Unicon (Maryland science fiction convention)
