= Maryland Food Collective =

- Industry: Food service
- Founded: College Park, Maryland, U.S. (August 1975)
- Founder: Matt Mayer
- Defunct: May 31, 2019
- Headquarters: College Park, Maryland, United States
- Number of locations: 1
- Area served: University of Maryland
- Products: Sandwiches, Vegan food, Vegetarian food, Gluten-free food, Organic food, Local food, Fair trade goods
- Services: Catering, Take-out
- Number of employees: 17 worker-owners, many more volunteers
- Website: thestamp.umd.edu/food/md_food_co-op

Maryland Food Collective, popularly known as The Co-op, was a worker-owned collective at the University of Maryland. The organization was founded in 1975 under a cooperative business structure with the goal of providing nutritious food. It operated under the motto, "Food for people, not for profit".

The student business was recognized as historically significant by the Smithsonian, with two of its posters currently being showcased in the National Museum of American History's Voting With Your Fork exhibit about alternative food systems, such as co-ops, that Americans have used as political tools to promote social, economic, environmental, and food justice.

== History ==
In the early 1970s, the University of Maryland failed in its attempts to create a food co-op, a book co-op, and a music co-op. However, a group of students did not give up. They began a "guerrilla sandwich line" campaign in which they sold sandwiches made at home at events, gatherings, and out of baskets around the campus. They were met with resistance from the local police but received overwhelming support from the student body. In August 1975, Matt Mayer, a student at the University of Maryland, College Park, submitted a proposal to the Student Government Association (SGA) for the formation of the Maryland Food Collective. The "sandwich line" remains to this day a staple of the food options offered to customers.

Although started as a movement against the university's administration, the food collective was featured on tours of the university and there exists a running archive of ledgers, advertisements and other documents from the collective in Hornbake Library.

In May 2019, the food collective closed after attempting to negotiate with the Adele H. Stamp Student Union to pay off debts amounting to $40,000.

== Cooperative business structure ==
According to a draft of the business plan of the collective:

The Co-op's current management and worker organization is based on an equal-pay, equal-responsibility and equal-role system. Every worker is hired into the same position and immediately given the same amount of responsibility and power. Each worker has equal democratic decision-making power and is expected to contribute equally to The Co-op. All workers are theoretically responsible for every aspect of the store.

== Sustainable practices ==
The Maryland Food Collective engaged in environmentally sustainable business practices. The Co-op used biodegradable plates and bowls and provided a 10% discount to customers who brought their own cutlery and containers. Additionally, the collective made use of Stamp's composting dumpster and composted much of their food waste.

== Food ==
=== Local and organic ===
Part grocery store, The Co-op featured a selection of locally produced and organic fruits and vegetables. These same ingredients were used in the making of the food served in the small cafe and sandwich shop. Although these were available in a much wider variety at the front of the store, the collective decided to remove their storefront vegetable shelves (along with much of their grocery section) around 2012. However, fruits were still available by the registers and customers could ask a worker to retrieve any specific vegetables from their kitchen's walk-in refrigerator.

=== Vegan and vegetarian ===
The Co-op offered a wide assortment of vegan and vegetarian-friendly food options, with the sandwich line featuring over 50 different ingredients. It also featured a vegan daily hot special. The store sold vegan sides, snacks and desserts, with meals averaging $5 to $7.

== Customer service ==
In 2007, The Co-op instituted an anti-discrimination policy for serving students after a worker refused to ring up the purchases of a student wearing a shirt that stated "I Stand for Israel". The new policy "respects the right of an individual worker or volunteer to remove themselves from the work environment and to choose not to act as an agent of the store", while it also "guarantees the right of any customer in the store to be served by a representative of the store, unless the customer is acting in a verbally, physically, or sexually threatening manner".

== See also ==
- List of food cooperatives
