= Adele Hagner Stamp =

First dean of women at the University of Maryland

- Born: 1893; Catonsville, Maryland
- Died: 1974 (aged 80–81); Silver Spring, Maryland
- Years active: 1922-1960
- Known for: being the first dean of women at University of Maryland, College Park

Adele Hagner Stamp (1893–1974) was the first dean of women at the University of Maryland, College Park and later named dean of women emeritus from the University Board of Regents. In 1990 she was inducted into the Maryland Women's Hall of Fame. In 1983, the University of Maryland named the student union building in her honor.

== Early life ==
In 1893, Adele H. Stamp was born in Catonsville, Maryland. Stamp grew up in Catonsville, approximately 20 miles from the University of Maryland, College Park campus where she would work for nearly four decades. She attended St. Timothy's School and Western High School.

== Early career and college education ==
Between 1913 and 1915, Stamp taught physical education at Catonsville High School.

During the summers of 1914 and 1915, she enrolled in a "College Courses for Teachers" program at Johns Hopkins University in Baltimore, Maryland. Stamp then enrolled at Sophie Newcomb College (the women's school associated with Tulane University). She spent the summers of 1915 and 1916 teaching physical education at Alfred University (in western New York State), and she returned to Maryland in the summer of 1917 to serve as summer school instructor at the University of Maryland.

=== World War I ===
As World War I approached, Stamp applied her experience as a recreation director and classwork in sociology as a social worker for the War Work Council of the Young Women's Christian Association (YWCA), where she formed recreation programs for female factory workers. She led recreation education for the 5,000 women employed at the Old Hickory Munitions Plant (external link) in Jacksonville, Tennessee 1918–1919.

=== Postwar ===
During 1919 and 1920 Stamp served as the director of recreation for female workers at the Industrial Service Center of the YWCA in New Orleans while finishing her studies at Newcomb College. In 1921, Stamp graduated from with a degree in sociology.

After graduation, Stamp accepted a position with the Red Cross as a field representative in the South. Soon after, University of Maryland president Albert F. Woods offered her the position of Dean of Women, which she accepted.

== Academic career at the University of Maryland ==
=== Dean of women of the University of Maryland (1922–1960) ===
Stamp served as Dean of Women at the University of Maryland, College Park for 38 years. She initially took the position as a one-year contract, which was renewed for a second year before being extended to comprise the remainder of her career. The university had just begun admitting women in 1916. During Stamp's tenure as Dean of Women, enrollment of female students increased from 93 in 1922 to approximately 4,000 in 1960. In 1923, she organized the Maryland State Association of Deans of Women, which soon gained membership from neighboring Delaware, Virginia, and Washington, DC.

In 1924, Stamp earned a master's degree in sociology at the University of Maryland, where she completed a thesis entitled "Community Organization in Maryland Welfare Organization." She undertook additional graduate work at Catholic University of America and American University.

During her time as dean of women, Stamp founded or helped to found many organizations:

- Women's Student Government Association at Maryland
- Campus Club
- Senior Honor Society (later renamed Mortar Board)
- Freshman Honor Society (later renamed Alpha Lambda Delta)
- Student chapter of the American Red Cross

=== Dean of women emeritus, University of Maryland (1960–1974) ===
When Stamp retired in December 1960, the University of Maryland Board of Regents awarded Stamp the title dean of women emeritus. Emeritus is the highest faculty honor bestowed by the board, and Stamp the first to receive the title. The Baltimore Sun, reporting on her retirement, mused that her 38 years of service was likely the "longest record of continuous service at a single school of any dean of women in the United States" (page 11).

== Personal life ==
While at the University of Maryland, Stamp participated in or help found numerous community and civic organizations:

- American Association of University Women (College Park branch and later state and national boards).
- Chair of Library Extension and of Education, for which she made speeches throughout Maryland urging higher salaries for teachers, better schools, and support for education bills in the legislature.
- Democratic National Convention.
- Maryland Historical Society (elected to active membership June 29, 1929).
- National Democratic Women's Club.

== Awards and honors ==
- The Board of Regents of the University of Maryland awarded Stamp the designation "Emeritus" at her retirement in 1960.
- The University of Maryland, College Park named the student Union in her honor in 1983 in recognition of her contributions to the university.
- The Maryland Women's Hall of Fame inducted Stamp in 1990.
- The Prince George's County Historical Society inducted Stamp to their Hall of Fame in 1995.
- Alpha Lambda Delta awards the annual Adele Hagner Stamp Fellowship, named in her honor.
