= University of Maryland Arboretum & Botanical Garden =

Park and garden in Maryland, US

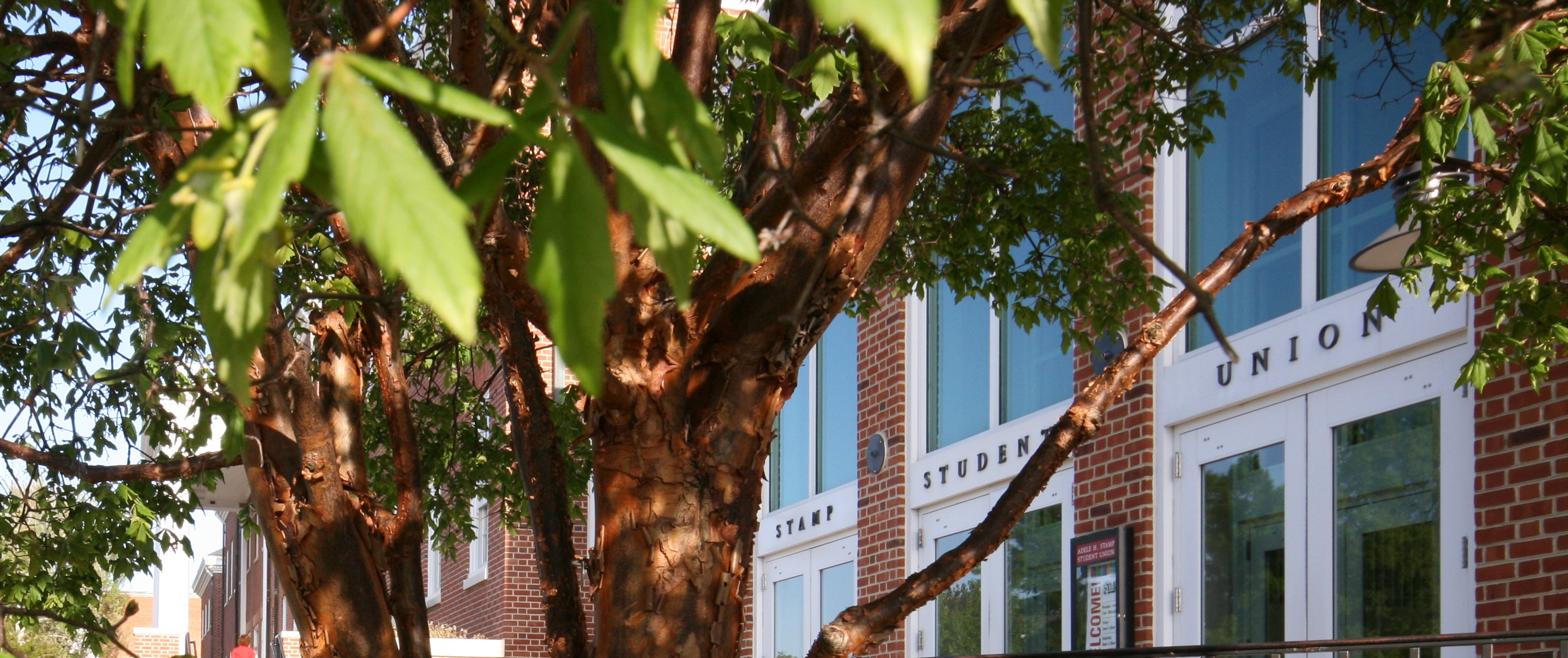
- Acer griseum by Adele H. Stamp Student Union
- Interactive map of University of Maryland Arboretum & Botanical Garden
- Website: Official website

The University of Maryland Arboretum and Botanical Garden is located on the grounds of the University of Maryland - College Park. The arboretum and botanical garden is free to visit and is used as an outdoor classroom for a variety of courses at the university. There is an established Central Campus Tree Walking Tour around McKeldin Mall.

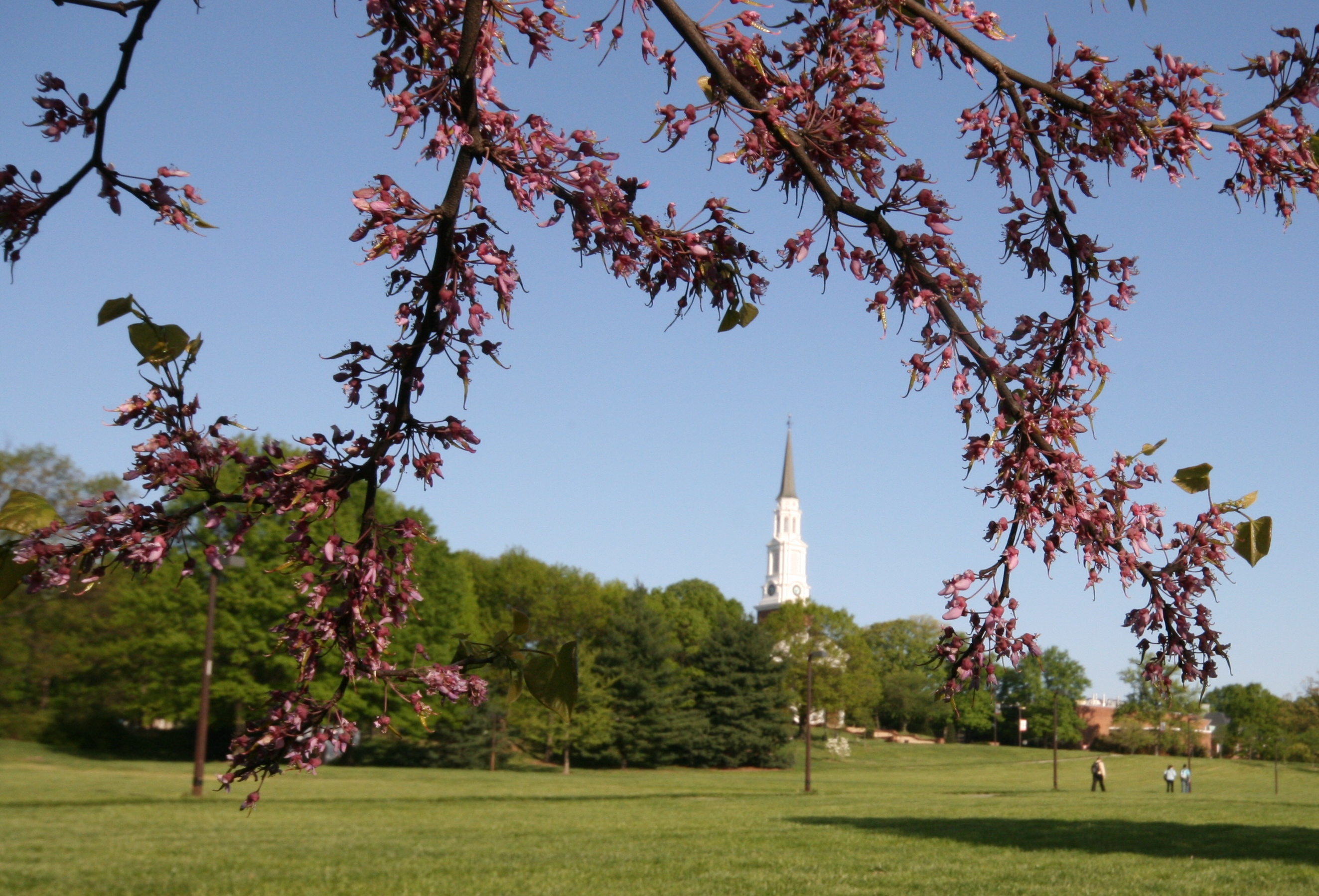
Memorial Chapel with Cercis canadensis

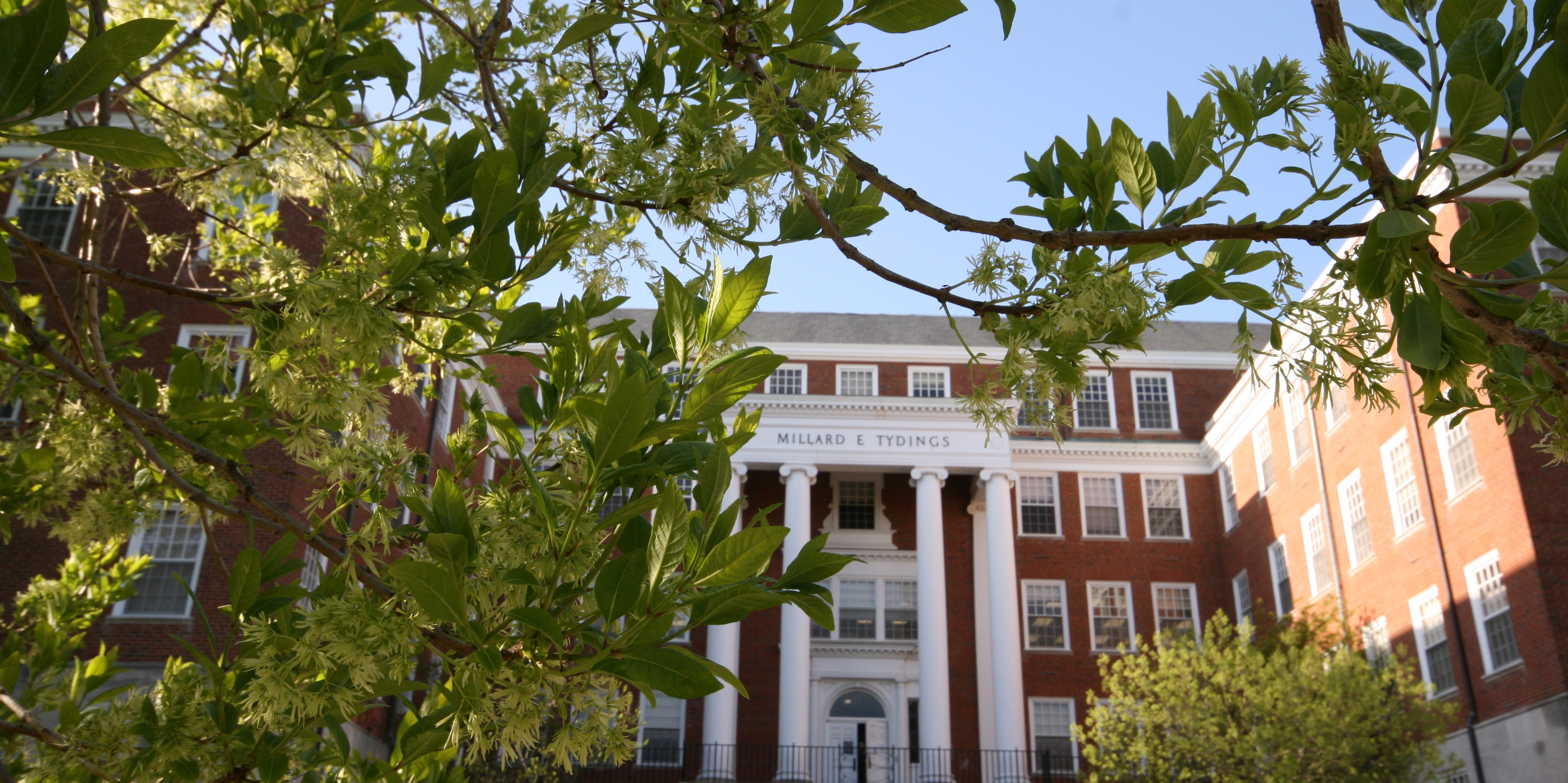
Tydings Building with Chionanthus virginicus

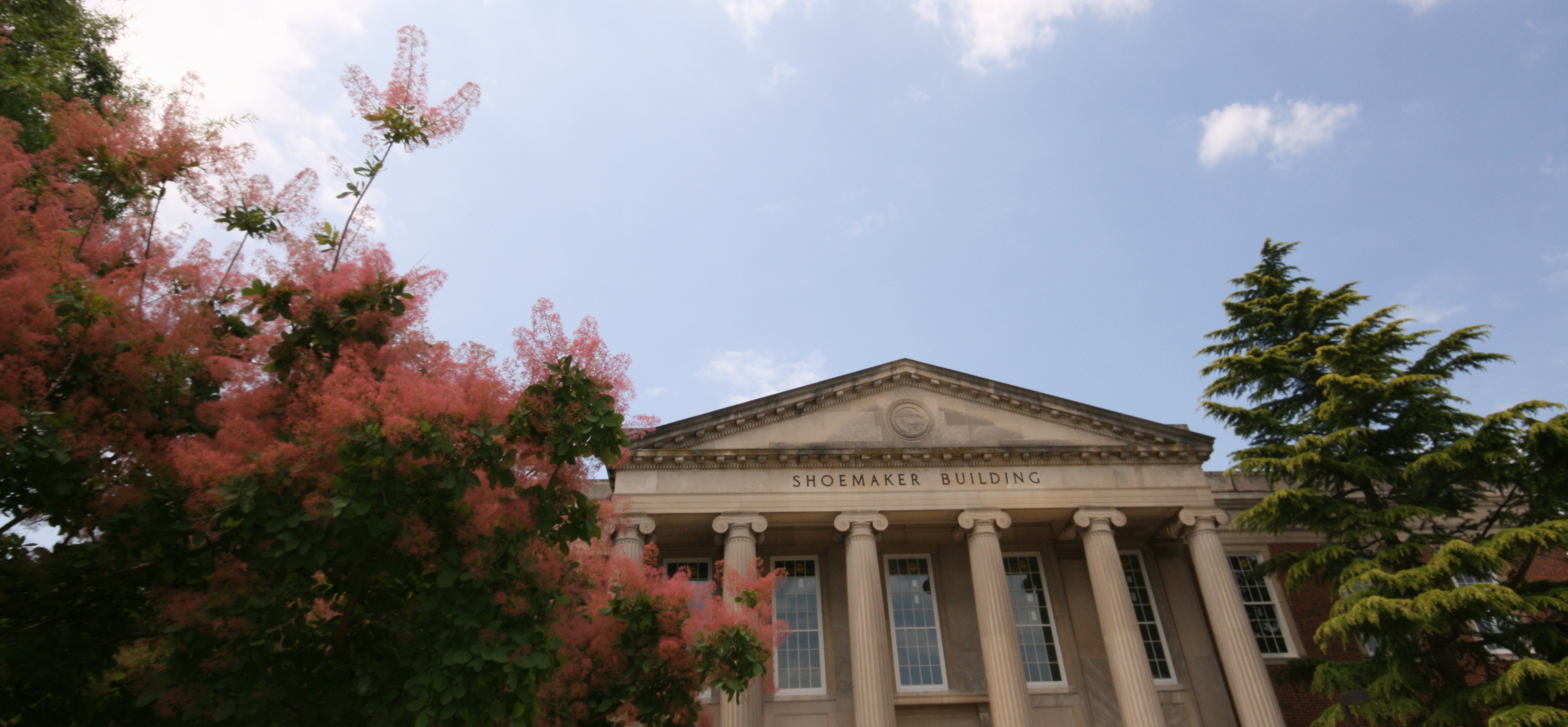
Shoemaker building with Cotinus coggygria and Cedrus deodara

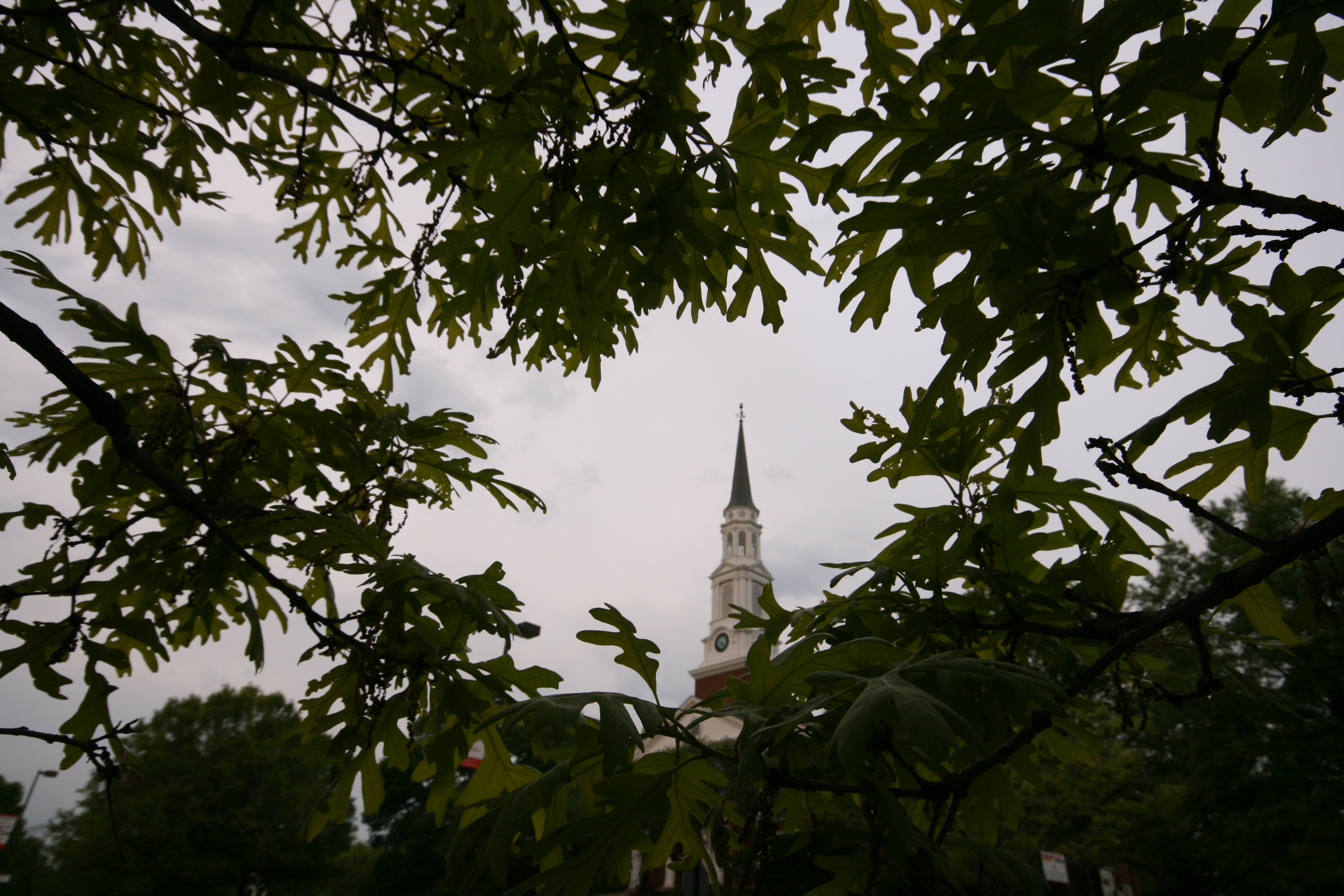
Memorial Chapel (University of Maryland) with Quercus alba

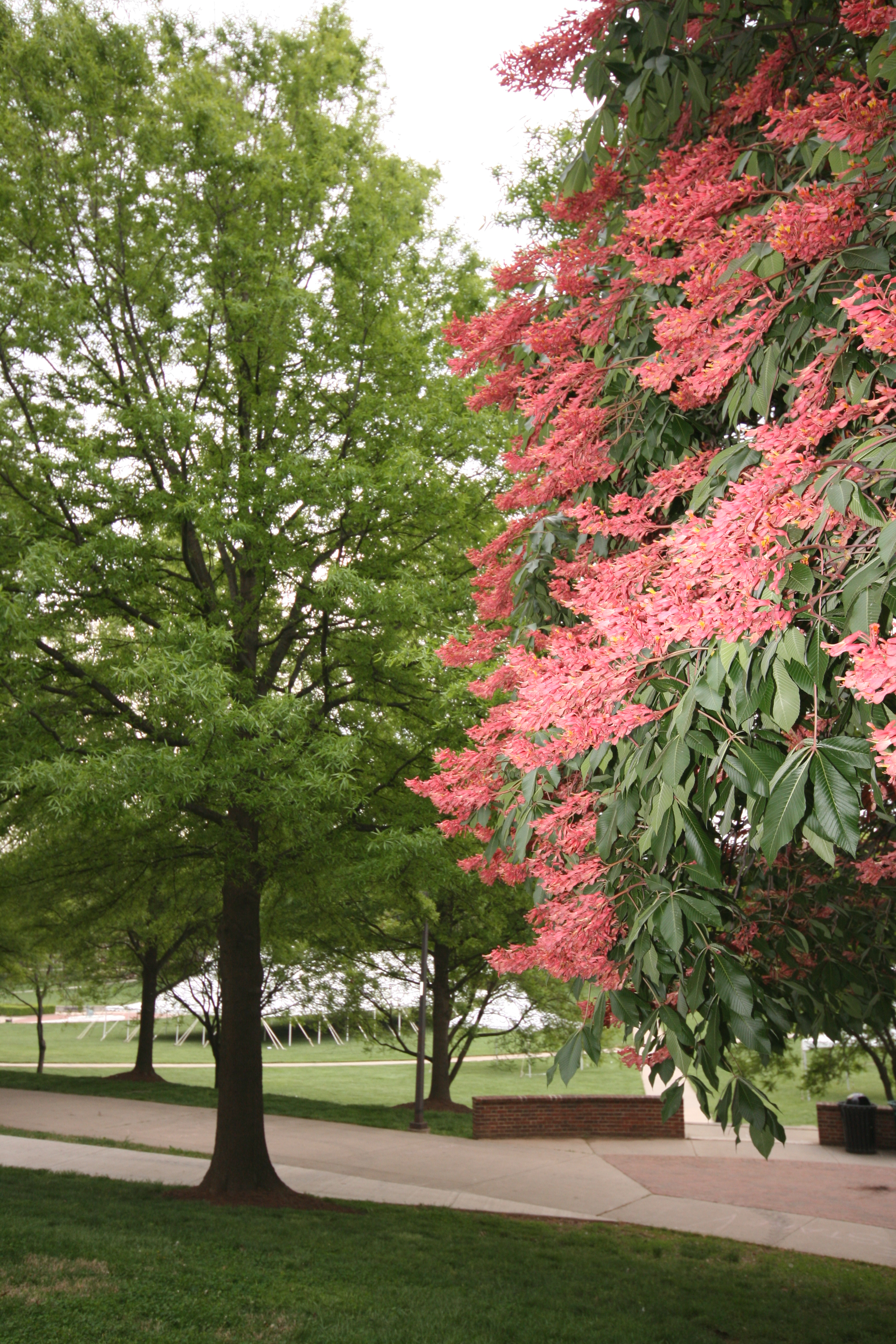
McKeldin Mall with Aesculus pavia
