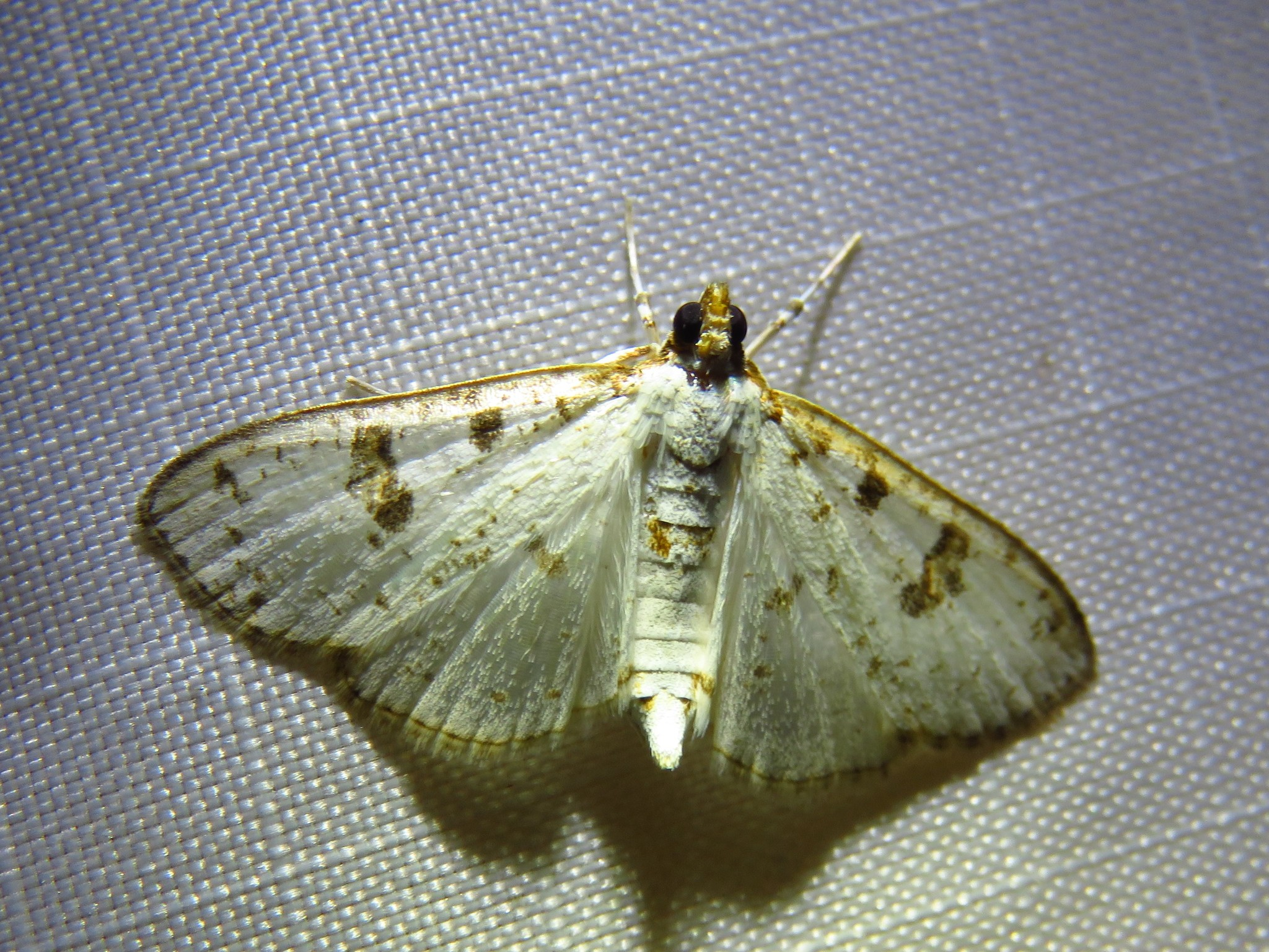

Scientific classification
- Kingdom: Animalia
- Phylum: Arthropoda
- Class: Insecta
- Order: Lepidoptera
- Family: Crambidae
- Genus: Palpita
- Species: P. illibalis

Binomial name
- Palpita illibalis (Hübner, 1818)

Synonyms
- Hapalia illibalis Hübner, 1818; Botys euphaesalis Walker, 1859; Botys subjectalis Lederer, 1863

= Palpita illibalis =

Species of moth

Palpita illibalis, the inkblot palpita moth, is a moth in the family Crambidae. It was described by Jacob Hübner in 1818. It is found in North America, where it has been recorded from Alabama, Florida, Georgia, Maryland, Mississippi, North Carolina, Ohio, Oklahoma, Pennsylvania, South Carolina, Tennessee, Virginia and West Virginia.

The wingspan is about 25 mm. Adults have been recorded on wing from March to October, with most records from June to August. The caterpillars are reported to feed on the leaves of the white fringetree in the Oleaceae plant family.
