= Moby Dick (restaurant) =

Kabob restaurant chain

Moby Dick House of Kabob
- Type: Privately held company
- Industry: Quick service restaurant
- Founded: 1989
- Founder: Nezameddin "Mike" Daryoush
- Headquarters: Washington D.C., United States
- Number of locations: 31 (as of August 2024)
- Area served: Washington Metropolitan Area
- Products: Persian cuisine and kabobs (chicken, beef, lamb, fish)
- Services: Catering
- Website: https://www.mobyskabob.com/

Moby Dick House of Kabob (Persian: موبی دیک: خانه کباب) is a Persian kabob restaurant chain in the Washington metropolitan area. It is named after a restaurant in Tehran which was right near the American Embassy during the Pahlavi dynasty; that restaurant was closed after the Iranian Revolution in 1979. The restaurant continues across from what is now the Artists' Forum in the city, becoming a popular place for many.

The first Moby Dick restaurant opened in Bethesda, Maryland in 1989.

== History ==
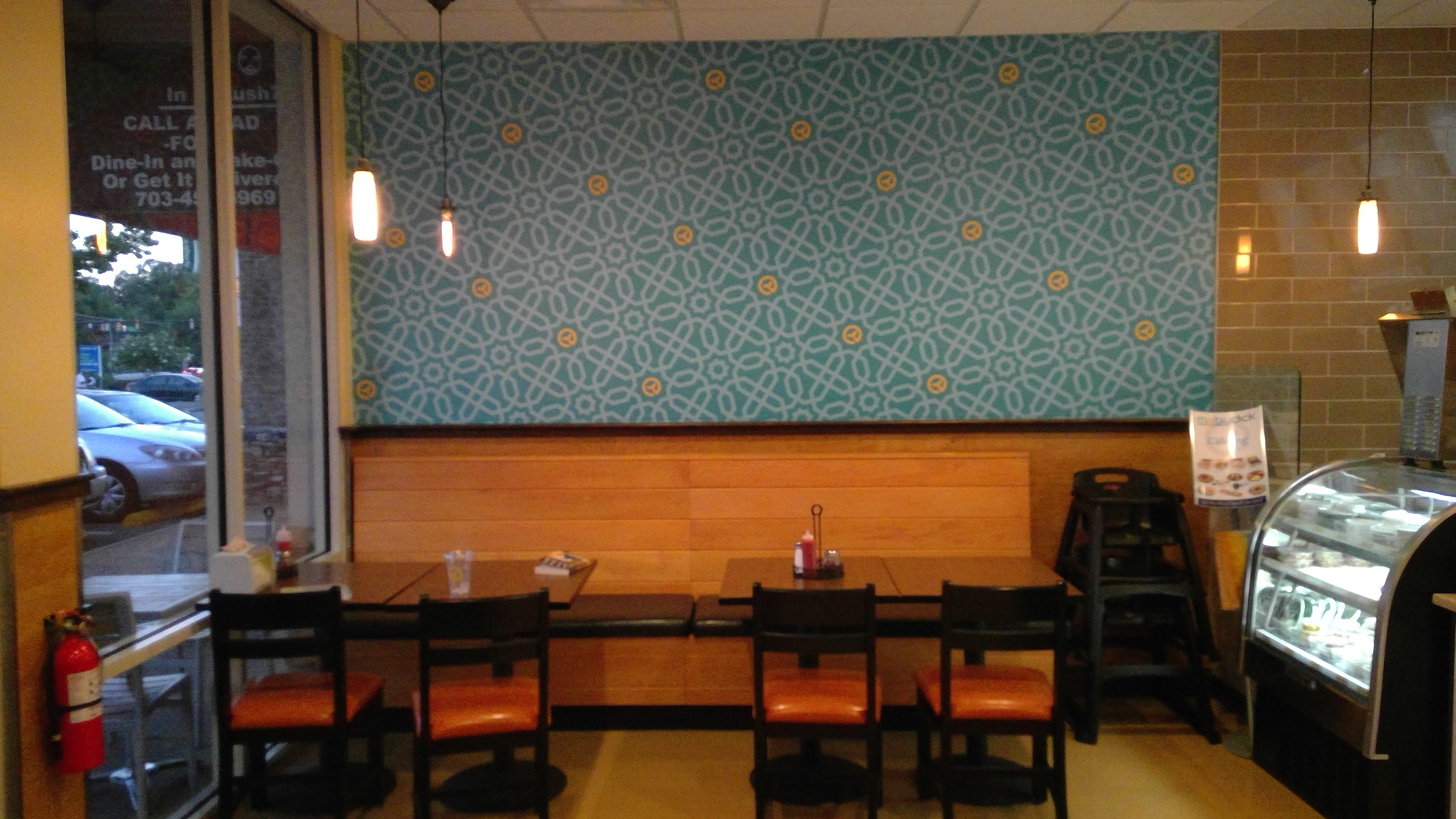
Interior of a Moby Dick restaurant in Springfield, Virginia

Founder Mike Daryoush emigrated to the United States from Iran in 1975. He opened a small sandwich shop in 1987 in Bethesda, Maryland, serving a few Middle Eastern dishes. He changed to a Persian menu and added a clay oven in 1990. The name references one of the biggest kabob joints in Tehran, which was right near the American Embassy during the Shah's time. It was called Moby Dick, apparently because the owner really liked the book. The newest location opened in Annapolis in 2024. Daryoush died of heart failure on May 9, 2019, only a week after the chain's 30th anniversary.
