= Henry Powell Hopkins =

American architect

Henry Powell Hopkins (February 12, 1891 – 1984) was an American architect.

Hopkins was born in Annapolis, Maryland, and attended Cornell University from 1909 to 1910. He continued to study at Columbia University until 1914, when he received a bachelor's degree in architecture. After a few years of working in Kansas City, Missouri, teaching at Texas A&M College, and receiving an honorary MA from St. John's College, Annapolis, Hopkins began work as an architectural designer in the offices of Albro and Lindeberg in New York in 1919. He opened his own architectural practice in Baltimore the same year with offices at 10 East Mulberry Street later moving to 347 North Charles Street. Hopkins joined the American Institute of Architects in 1921, then served as vice-president of the Baltimore Chapter from 1946 to 1948, and held the presidency from 1948 to 1950.

Examples of Hopkins’ work are both numerous and diverse, including dwellings, educational facilities, medical facilities, government buildings, and commercial projects. Much of this work is in a Colonial Revival influenced style, found particularly in his work for the University of Maryland, College Park. Hopkins was also the supervising architect responsible for the remodeling of the State Office Building in Annapolis (1939) and the restoration of the Old Treasury Building (1950).

Hopkins died in 1984 of chronic pneumonia at his home in Baltimore, Maryland.
