= 1951 Big Ten Conference football season =

- Sport: American football
- Teams: 9
- Top draft pick: Johnny Karras
- Champion: Illinois
- Season MVP: Bill Reichardt

Football seasons
- ← 1950 1952 →

1951 Big Ten Conference football standings
	Conf.					Overall
Team	W		L		T	W		L		T
No. 4 Illinois $	5	–	0	–	1	9	–	0	–	1
Purdue	4	–	1	–	0	5	–	4	–	0
No. 8 Wisconsin	5	–	1	–	1	7	–	1	–	1
Michigan	4	–	2	–	0	4	–	5	–	0
Ohio State	2	–	2	–	2	4	–	3	–	2
Northwestern	2	–	4	–	0	5	–	4	–	0
Minnesota	1	–	4	–	1	2	–	6	–	1
Indiana	1	–	5	–	0	2	–	7	–	0
Iowa	0	–	5	–	1	2	–	5	–	2
$ – Conference champion; Rankings from AP Poll

The 1951 Big Ten Conference football season was the 56th season of college football played by the member schools of the Big Ten Conference (also known as the Western Conference and the Big Nine Conference) and was a part of the 1951 college football season.

The 1951 Illinois Fighting Illini football team, under head coach Ray Eliot, compiled a 9–0–1 record, won the Big Ten championship, was ranked No. 4 in the final AP poll, and defeated Stanford 40–7 in the 1952 Rose Bowl. The lone setback was a scoreless tie with Ohio State. Halfback Johnny Karras was the Big Ten's only consensus first-team All-American. Linebacker Chuck Boerio was selected as the team's most valuable player.

The 1951 Wisconsin Badgers football team, under head coach Ivy Williamson, compiled a 7–1–1 record, led the conference in scoring defense (5.9 points allowed per game), and was ranked No. 8 in the final AP poll. Quarterback John Coatta was the first-team All-Big Ten quarterback. Defensive end Pat O'Donahue was selected as a first-team All-American by multiple selectors.

== Season overview ==
=== Results and team statistics ===
Conf. Rank	Team	Head coach	AP final	AP high	Overall record	Conf. record	PPG	PAG	MVP
1	Illinois	Ray Eliot	#4	#2	9–0–1	5–0–1	**22.0**	8.3	Chuck Boerio
2	Purdue	Stu Holcomb	NR	NR	5–4	4–1	17.0	16.9	Pete Brewster
3	Wisconsin	Ivy Williamson	#8	#7	7–1–1	5–1–1	21.8	**5.9**	Hal Faverty
4	Michigan	Bennie Oosterbaan	NR	#15	4–5	4–2	15.0	13.6	Don Peterson
5	Ohio State	Woody Hayes	NR	#3	4–3–2	2–3–2	12.1	11.6	Vic Janowicz
6	Northwestern	Bob Voigts	NR	#13	5-4	2-4	12.4	13.8	John Steeb
7	Minnesota	Wes Fesler	NR	NR	2–6–1	1–4–1	18.0	28.7	Ron Engel
8	Indiana	Bernie Crimmins	NR	NR	2–7	1–5	15.9	24.9	Gene Gedman
9	Iowa	Leonard Raffensperger	NR	NR	2–5–2	0–5–1	17.9	25.9	**Bill Reichardt**

Key
AP final = Team's rank in the final AP Poll of the 1951 season
AP high = Team's highest rank in the AP Poll throughout the 1951 season
PPG = Average of points scored per game; conference leader's average displayed in bold
PAG = Average of points allowed per game; conference leader's average displayed in bold
MVP = Most valuable player as voted by players on each team as part of the voting process to determine the winner of the Chicago Tribune Silver Football trophy; trophy winner in bold

=== Regular season ===
==== September 29 ====
- Illinois 27, UCLA 13.
- Texas 14, Purdue 0.
- Wisconsin 22, Marquette 6.
- Michigan State 25, Michigan 0.
- Ohio State 7, SMU 0.
- Northwestern 35, Colorado 14.
- Washington 25, Minnesota 20.
- Notre Dame 48, Indiana 6.
- Iowa 16, Kansas State 0.

==== October 6 ====
- Illinois 14, Wisconsin 10.
- Purdue 34, Iowa 30.
- Stanford 23, Michigan 13.
- Michigan State 24, Ohio State 20.
- Northwestern 20, Army 14.
- California 55, Minnesota 14.
- Indiana 13, Pittsburgh 6.

==== October 13 ====
- Illinois 41, Syracuse 20.
- Miami (FL) 7, Purdue 0 (game played Friday, October 12).
- Ohio State 6, Wisconsin 6.
- Michigan 33, Indiana 14.
- Ohio State 6, Wisconsin 6.
- Northwestern 21, Minnesota 7.
- Iowa 34, Pittsburgh 17.

==== October 20 ====
- Illinois 27, Washington 20.
- Wisconsin 31, Purdue 7.
- Michigan 21, Iowa 0.
- Indiana 32, Ohio State 10.
- Northwestern 16, Navy 7.
- Nebraska 39, Minnesota 20.

==== October 27 ====
- Illinois 21, Indiana 0.
- Notre Dame 30, Purdue 9.
- Wisconsin 41, Northwestern 0.
- Michigan 54, Minnesota 27.
- Ohio State 47, Iowa 21.

==== November 3 ====
- Illinois 7, Michigan 0.
- Purdue 28, Penn State 0.
- Wisconsin 6, Indiana 0.
- Ohio State 3, Northwestern 0.
- Iowa 20, Minnesota 20.

==== November 10 ====
- Illinois 40, Iowa 13.
- Purdue 35, Northwestern 14.
- Wisconsin 16, Pennsylvania 7.
- Cornell 20, Michigan 7.
- Ohio State 16, Pittsburgh 14.
- Minnesota 16, Indiana 14.

==== November 17 ====
- Illinois 0, Ohio State 0.
- Purdue 19, Minnesota 13.
- Wisconsin 34, Iowa 7.
- Northwestern 6, Michigan 0.
- Michigan State 30, Indiana 26

==== November 24 ====
- Illinois 3, Northwestern 0.
- Purdue 21, Indiana 13.
- Wisconsin 30, Minnesota 6.
- Michigan 7, Ohio State 0.
- Iowa 20, Notre Dame 20.

== Awards and honors ==
=== All-Big Ten honors ===
The following players were picked by the Associated Press (AP)as first-team players on the 1951 All-Big Ten Conference football team. The AP picked separate offensive and defensive units, whereas the UP selected a single, eleven man unit.

AP offense and UP overall selections

Position	Name	Team	Selectors
Quarterback	John Coatta	Wisconsin	AP, UP
Halfback	Johnny Karras	Illinois	AP, UP
Halfback	Paul Giel	Minnesota	AP
Halfback	Vic Janowicz	Ohio State	UP
Fullback	Bill Reichardt	Iowa	AP, UP
End	Lowell Perry	Michigan	AP, UP
End	Rex Smith	Illinois	AP
End	Leo Sugar	Purdue	AP [defensive end], UP [end]
Tackle	Tom Johnson	Michigan	AP, UP
Tackle	Chuck Ulrich	Illinois	AP, UP
Guard	Don MacRae	Northwestern	AP, UP
Guard	Chuck Studley	Illinois	AP, UP
Center	Wayne Robinson	Minnesota	AP
Center	Chuck Boerio	Illinois	AP [linebacker], UP [center]

AP defensive unit

Position	Name	Team	Selectors
Defensive end	Pat O'Donahue	Wisconsin	AP
Defensive end	Leo Sugar	Purdue	AP [defensive end], UP [end]
Defensive tackle	Dick Logan	Ohio State	AP
Defensive tackle	Jerry Smith	Wisconsin	AP
Defensive guard	Robert Kennedy	Wisconsin	AP
Defensive guard	Deral Teteak	Wisconsin	AP
Linebacker	Chuck Boerio	Illinois	AP [linebacker], UP [center]
Linebacker	Roger Zatkoff	Michigan	AP
Defensive back	Vic Janowicz	Ohio State	AP
Defensive back	Al Brosky	Illinois	AP
Defensive back	Fred Bruney	Ohio State	AP

=== All-American honors ===
At the end of the 1951 season, only one Big Ten player secured a consensus first-team pick on the 1951 College Football All-America Team. The Big Ten's consensus All-Americans were:

Position	Name	Team	Selectors
Halfback	Johnny Karras	Illinois	AFCA, AAB, FWAA, TSN, UP, CP, WCFF

Other Big Ten players who were named first-team All-Americans by at least one selector were:

Position	Name	Team	Selectors
Offensive end	Hal Faverty	Wisconsin	INS
Offensive tackle	Chuck Ulrich	Illinois	INS
Center	Chuck Boerio	Illinois	NEA
Defensive end	Pat O'Donahue	Wisconsin	AP, FWAA, NEA
Defensive end	Leo Sugar	Purdue	CT
Defensive tackle	Tom Johnson	Michigan	CT
Defensive back	Al Brosky	Illinois	AP [defensive halfback], FWAA [safety]

=== Other awards ===
Illinois running back Johnny Karras finished sixth in the voting for the 1951 Heisman Trophy.

== 1952 NFL draft ==
The following Big Ten players were among the first 100 picks in the 1952 NFL draft:

Name	Position	Team	Round	Overall pick
Johnny Karras	Back	Illinois	2	16
Pete Brewster	End	Purdue	2	21
Joe Campanella	Tackle	Ohio State	3	36
Chuck Ulrich	Tackle	Illinois	4	41
Pat O'Donahue	End	Wisconsin	5	57
Tom Johnson	Tackle	Michigan	6	63
Bill Reichardt	Back	Iowa	7	76
Vic Janowicz	Back	Ohio State	7	79
Mel Becket	Center	Indiana	8	87
Wayne Robinson	Center	Minnesota	8	89
Hubert Johnston	Tackle	Iowa	8	91
Jerry Smith	Tackle	Wisconsin	8	94
Deral Teteak	Guard	Wisconsin	9	100
