= 1951 Ohio State Buckeyes football team =

American college football season

1951 Ohio State Buckeyes football
- Conference: Big Ten Conference
- Record: 4–3–2 (2–2–2 Big Ten)
- Head coach: Woody Hayes (1st season)
- MVP: Vic Janowicz
- Captain: Robert C. Heid
- Home stadium: Ohio Stadium

1951 Big Ten Conference football standings
	Conf.					Overall
Team	W		L		T	W		L		T
No. 4 Illinois $	5	–	0	–	1	9	–	0	–	1
Purdue	4	–	1	–	0	5	–	4	–	0
No. 8 Wisconsin	5	–	1	–	1	7	–	1	–	1
Michigan	4	–	2	–	0	4	–	5	–	0
Ohio State	2	–	2	–	2	4	–	3	–	2
Northwestern	2	–	4	–	0	5	–	4	–	0
Minnesota	1	–	4	–	1	2	–	6	–	1
Indiana	1	–	5	–	0	2	–	7	–	0
Iowa	0	–	5	–	1	2	–	5	–	2
$ – Conference champion; Rankings from AP Poll

The 1951 Ohio State Buckeyes football team was an American football team that represented the Ohio State University as a member of the Big Ten Conference during the 1951 Big Ten season. In their first year under head coach Woody Hayes, the Buckeyes compiled a 4–3–2 record (2–2–2 in conference games), finished in fifth place in the Big Ten, and outscored opponents by a total of 109 to 104. The Buckeyes opened the season ranked No. 3 in the AP poll, but dropped from the AP rankings after compiling a 1–2–1 record in their first four games, including a close 24–20 loss to No. 1 Michigan State and a 32–10 upset loss to unranked Indiana. They then won three straight games, but concluded the season with two games in which they failed to score any points: a scoreless tie against undefeated No. 3 Illinois; and a 7–0 loss to unranked Michigan. Unranked in the final AP and UP polls, they were ranked No. 31 out of 650 teams included in the final Litkenhous Ratings.

The Buckeyes gained an average of 139.1 rushing yards and 115.7 passing yards per game. On defense, they gave up 136.2 rushing yards and 136.8 passing yards per game. The team's statistical leaders included quarterback Tony Curcillo (912 passing yards, 43.6% completion percentage), halfback Vic Janowicz (376 rushing yards, 3.5 yard per carry), and end Robert Joslin (18 receptions for 281 yards). Janowicz was the only player to receive national honors, receiving second-team honors on the 1951 All-America team.

The team played its home games at Ohio Stadium in Columbus, Ohio. The team attracted a school record 455,737 fans at six home games, an average of 75,652 per game.

== Schedule ==
Date	Opponent	Rank	Site	Result	Attendance	Source
September 29	SMU*	No. 3	Ohio Stadium; Columbus, OH	W 7–0	80,735	
October 6	No. 1 Michigan State*	No. 7	Ohio Stadium; Columbus, OH	L 20–24	82,640	
October 13	at Wisconsin	No. 9	Camp Randall Stadium; Madison, WI	T 6–6	51,156	
October 20	Indiana	No. 17	Ohio Stadium; Columbus, OH	L 10–32	74,265	
October 27	Iowa		Ohio Stadium; Columbus, OH	W 47–21	67,551	
November 3	Northwestern		Ohio Stadium; Columbus, OH	W 3–0	71,089	
November 10	at Pittsburgh*	No. 20	Pitt Stadium; Pittsburgh, PA	W 16–14	34,747	
November 17	No. 3 Illinois^{†}		Ohio Stadium; Columbus, OH (Illibuck)	T 0–0	79,457	
November 24	at Michigan		Michigan Stadium; Ann Arbor, MI (rivalry)	L 0–7	93,411–95,000	
*Non-conference game; ^{†}Homecoming; Rankings from AP Poll released prior to the game

== Hiring of Woody Hayes ==
In February 1951, Ohio State hired 38-year-old Woody Hayes as its 19th head football coach. He had previously been the head football coach at Denison from 1946 to 1948 and at Miami (OH) from 1949 to 1950, compiling an overall record of 51–23–1. He led Denison to back-to-back undefeated seasons in 1947 and 1948 and led the 1950 Miami team to a 9–1 record, including a victory over Arizona State in the 1951 Salad Bowl. Bo Schembechler played for Hayes at Miami in 1949 and 1950 and joined Hayes at Ohio State as a graduate assistant in 1951.

== Game summaries ==
=== SMU ===
On September 29, Ohio State opened the Woody Hayes era with a 7–0 victory over SMU before a crowd of 80,735 at Ohio Stadium in Columbus, Ohio. In the second quarter, the Buckeyes drove 63 yards, culminating with a 20-yard touchdown pass from Tony Curcillo to Bob Joslin. SMU quarterback Fred Benners completed 21 of 29 passes for 211 yards, but the Mustangs were unable to score. Ohio State tallied 259 yards in the game (172 rushing, 87 passing) and gave up 249 yards to SMU (38 rushing, 211 passing).

=== Michigan State ===
- Big Ten Network: Michigan State vs. Ohio State, 1951

On October 6, Ohio State lost a close game, 24–20, against No. 1 Michigan State before a crowd of 82,640 at Ohio Stadium. Ohio State took an early lead and remained ahead, 20–10, at the start of the fourth quarter. The Spartans scored 14 points in the fourth quarter. The game-winning score followed a fumble by Ohio fullback Bob Koepnick at the Buckeyes' 45-yard line. The Spartans scored on fourth down from the Buckeye 28-yard line with two minutes remaining, running a "buck lateral" series in which fullback Evan Slonac took a direct snap, faked a line plunge before handing off to quarterback Al Dorow who lateraled to Tom Yewcic who ran wide right, pulling the Buckeye defenders in that direction; Yewcic then spun a threw a perfect pass (the first of his college career) across the field back to Dorow who caught the ball at the 11-yard line and evaded three Buckeye defenders for the touchdown. Tommy Devine of the Detroit Free Press described the game as "strictly Hollywood" and "a spinetingling battle with an uproarious finish." Ohio State gained 370 yards (186 rushing, 184 passing), while Michigan State tallied 401 yards (234 rushing, 167 passing).

=== Wisconsin ===
Ohio State at Wisconsin

Team	1	2	3	4	Total
Ohio State	0	0	0	6	6
Wisconsin	0	6	0	0	6

- Date: October 13
- Location: Camp Randall Stadium
  Madison, WI
- Game attendance: 51,156
- Big Ten Network: Ohio State vs. Wisconsin, 1951

On October 13, Ohio State played Wisconsin to a 6–6 tie before a crowd of 51,156 at Camp Randall Stadium in Madison, Wisconsin. Late in the second quarter, Wisconsin quarterback John Coatta led the Badgers on a 69-yard drive, ending with a six-yard touchdown pass to Hal Faverty in the end zone. Wisconsin missed the extra point and led, 6–0. In the fourth quarter, Ohio State's Bernie Skvarka took a handoff from Doug Goodsel on a punt and returned it 63 yards to the Wisconsin five-yard line. The Buckeyes scored on third down with a pass from Vic Janowicz to Ralph Armstrong in the end zone. Janowicz missed the extra point kick, and the game ended in a 6–6 tie. The Badgers out-gained the Buckeyes by a total of 346 yards (174 rushing, 172 passing) to 106 (61 rushing, 45 passing).

=== Indiana ===
On October 20, Ohio State, then ranked No. 17 in the AP poll, were upset by unranked Indiana by a 32–10 score before a crowd of 74,265 at Ohio Stadium. The games was Ohio State's national television debut. The Buckeye came into the game favored by three touchdowns, but Indiana jumped to a 19–3 lead in the first quarter, led 26–3 at halftime, and held the Buckeyes' offense two seven points in the second half. It was largest margin of victory by Indiana over Ohio State in the 48 games played between the teams to that point. John Dietrich in The Plain Dealer called it "a comprehensive, almost unbelievable rout" and wrote that the large crowd saw "a futile, inept and bewildered Ohio team practically chased off its home field." Despite the rout in Indiana's favor on the scoreboard, Ohio State tallied 358 yards in the game (279 rushing, 79 passing), exceeding Indiana's 283 yards (137 rushing, 146 passing).

=== Iowa ===
On October 27, Ohio State defeated Iowa, 47–21, before a crowd of 67,551 at Ohio Stadium. It was Ohio State's highest point total of the season. Tony Curcillo threw four touchdown passes and ran for two more to give Woody Hayes his first conference victory. Curcillo completed 10 of 14 passes for 292 yards. Vic Janowicz played only on special teams in the Iowa game due to a bruised rib sustained the prior week against Indiana. The Buckeyes gained 399 yards (308 passing, 91 rushing) to 342 yards (172 rushing, 170 passing) for Iowa.

=== Northwestern ===
Team	1	2	3	4	Total
Illinois	0	0	0	0	0
• Ohio State	0	0	0	3	3

- Date: November 3
- Location: Ohio Stadium, Columbus, OH
- Game attendance: 71,089

On November 3, Ohio State defeated Northwestern, 3–0, before a crowd of 71,089 at Ohio Stadium in Columbus. Neither team scored in the first three quarters. In the fourth quarter, In the fourth quarter, a holding penalty backed up Northwestern to its one 25-yard line. From there, a short punt gave the Buckeyes the ball at the Northwestern 46-yard line. The Buckeyes drove to the nine-yard line and scored on a field goal by Vic Janowicz. Northwestern twice moved within the Buckeyes' nin-yad line but failed to score. Fred Bruney had a game-saving interception late in the game. The game was played in "ice and snow" with "an 18 mile wind" blowing through the horseshoe of the stadium. The game was dubbed the "Deep Freeze Bowl" in the Ohio State yearbook.

=== Pittsburgh ===
Ohio State at Pitt

Team	1	2	3	4	Total
• Ohio State	6	7	3	0	16
Pitt	0	0	0	14	14

- Date: November 10, 1951
- Location: Pitt Stadium
  Pittsburgh, PA
- Game start: 2:00 p.m.
- Game attendance: 34,757
- Game weather: warm and windy
- Referee: Lyle M. Clarno

Scoring summary
1	OSU	Curcillo 1-yard run (kick missed)	OSU 6–0
2	OSU	Curcillo 26-yard run (Vic Janowicz kick)	OSU 13–0
3	OSU	20-yard field goal Janowicz	OSU 16–0
3	PITT	Bobby Epps 1-yard run ( Bob Wrabley kick )	OSU 16–7
4	PITT	Bob Bestwick 1-yard run ( Wrabley kick )	OSU 16–14

On November 10, Ohio State defeated Pittsburgh, 16–14, before a homecoming crowd of 34,757 in Pittsburgh. It was the tenth consecutive loss for Pittsburgh. The Buckeyes scored in each of the first three quarters to build a 16–0 lead. Ohio quarterback Tony Curcillo scored twice. In the first period, he capped a 56-yard drive with a one-yard touchdown run. Vic Janowicz missed the extra point. Curcillo's second score came on a 26-yard run around right end. Janowicz added the extra point for a 13–0 halftime lead. In the third quarter, Janowicz kicked a field goal. The Panthers' offense produced two touchdowns in the final period. The first came on a 46-yard drive that ended with fullback Bobby Epps scoring from the one-yard line. Bob Wrabley's extra point was good. The last scoring drive went 75 yards, with Bob Bestwick scoring on a quarterback sneak with 38 seconds left on the clock. Wrabley's kick was good.

=== Illinois ===
Team	1	2	3	4	Total
Illinois	0	0	0	0	0
Ohio State	0	0	0	0	0

- Date: November 17
- Location: Ohio Stadium, Columbus, OH
- Game attendance: 79,457

On November 17, Ohio State played undefeated No. 3 Illinois to a scoreless tie before a homecoming crowd of 79,457 at Ohio Stadium in Columbus, Ohio. Each team had scoring opportunities, but failed to convert. Ohio State drove to Illinois' seven-yard line, but a field goal attempt failed due to a bad snap from center. In the fourth quarter, Vic Janowicz fumbled on the Buckeyes' nine-yard line, but Illinois fullback fumbled the ball back to the Buckeyes on the next play. On another occasion, Illinois drove to Ohio State's 13-yard line, but Ohio State defensive halfback Fred Bruney intercepted a Tom O'Connell pass at the goal line to end the threat. Bruney was the Buckeyes' defensive star with three interceptions in the game. Ohio State gained a net of 191 yards to 167 for Illinois.

=== Michigan ===
Team	1	2	3	4	Total
Ohio St	0	0	0	0	0
• Michigan	0	7	0	0	7

- Date: November 24
- Location: Michigan Stadium, Ann Arbor, MI
- Game attendance: 95,000

On November 24, Ohio State and Michigan faced off before a crowd of 95,000 at Michigan Stadium in a rare instance where neither of the rivals was ranked in the AP or UP polls. The only scoring of the game came on a 49-yard Michigan drive late in the second quarter, culminating with a six-yard touchdown run by fullback Don Peterson and a successful extra-point kick by Russ Rescoria. One play before Peterson scored, Michigan's Don Zanfagna caught a pass at the six-yard line; Zanfagna was hit hard, causing the ball to bounce from his arms with Buckeyes' guard Steve Ruzich recovering the ball, but the officials ruled that Zanfagna was down before he lost the ball.

Ohio State turned the ball over four times on fumbles. The Buckeyes never moved the ball inside Micigan's 20-yard line and were held to 222 yards (120 rushing, 102 passing). Michigan gained only 215 yards (135 rushing, 80 passing). Michigan's senior halfback and team captain Bill Putich, an east Cleveland native playing his last game for the Wolverines, was described by The Plain Dealer as a "workhorse", completing 10 of 21 passes for 64 yards and carrying the ball 14 times for 30 yards. After the game, Woody Hayes summed up the game: "You've got to play your best ball to beat Michigan. We didn't. That's all."

== Personnel ==
=== Players ===
Tony Curcillo

Fred Bruney

Vic Janowicz

The following 38 players received varsity letters at the team's appreciation banquet held on November 26, 1951:

- Harry Andrews, Toledo, OH
- Dick Arledge, defensive back and linebacker, No. 23, Chillicothe, OH
- Ralph Armstrong, end, Cleveland, OH
- Marts Beekley, defensive back, No. 48, Sharonville, OH
- John Borton, linebacker, freshman, Alliance, OH
- Fred Bruney, Martins Ferry, OH
- Tony Curcillo, quarterback/fullback, Elyria, OH
- Bob Endres, tackle, Cincinnati
- Louis Fischer, Charleston, WV
- Sonny Gandee, defensive end, Akron, OH
- Doug Goodsell, Columbus, OH
- Bob Grimes, end, Middletown, OH
- George Guthrie, Columbus, OH
- Roy Hamilton, end, Canton, OH
- Bob Heid, captain and center linebacker, Fremont, OH
- Jim Hietikko, Conneaut, OH
- John Hlay, Niles, OH
- George Jacoby, Toledo, OH
- Vic Janowicz, captain and halfback, Elyria, OH
- Bob Joslin, end, No. 85, Middletown, OH
- Walt Klevay, halfback, No. 16, Independence, OH
- Bob Koepnick, Dayton, OH
- Jerry Krischer, Massillon, OH
- Dick Logan, tackle, senior, No. 71, Mansfield, OH
- Jim Merrell, Geneva, OH
- Tom Rath, Defiance, OH
- Jim Reichenbach, Massillon, OH
- Tom Richards, Martins Ferry, OH
- Thor Ronemus, Springfield, OH
- Steve Ruzich, guard, No. 60, Madison, OH
- Carroll Smith, Sebring, OH
- Bernie Skavarka, halfback, No. 44, Struthers, OH
- Mike Takacs, Massillon, OH
- Jack Wagner, fullback, Piqua, OH
- Dick Walther, Dayton, OH
- Jules Wittman, tackle, Massillon, OH
- Bill Wilks, Hamilton, OH
- George Rosso, Pittsburgh

=== Coaches and administrative staff ===
1951 coaching staff: Doyt Perry, Harry Strobel, Ernie Godfrey, Esco Sarkkinen, Woody Hayes, Bill Hess, Gene Fekete, Bill Arnsparger, Bo Schembechler

- Head coach: Woody Hayes, first year
- Assistant coaches:

- Doyt Perry, backfield
- Harry Strobel
- Ernie Godfrey
- Esco Sarkkinen
- Bill Hess
- Gene Fekete
- Bill Arnsparger, defensive line
- Bo Schembechler, graduate assistant

Four members of the staff (Hayes, Perry, Godfrey, and Schembechler) were later inducted into the College Football Hall of Fame.

== Awards and honors ==
Halfback Vic Janowicz was the only Ohio State player to receive national honors, having been selected by the Associated Press, United Press, and Central Press as a second-team back on the 1951 All-America team. Janowicz also won the team's most valuable player award.

The following Ohio State players received first- or second-team honors from the Associated Press (AP) or United Press (UP) on their 1951 All-Big Ten Conference football teams:

- Vic Janowicz, halfback (AP-1 [defensive back], UP-1)
- Sonny Gandee, end (UP-2)
- Dick Logan, defensive tackle (AP-1, UP-2)
- Fred Bruney, defensive back (AP-1)

== Statistics ==
=== Rushing ===
Player	Attempts	Net yards	Yards per attempt	Touchdowns
Vic Janowicz	106	376	3.5	1
Jack Wagner	54	232	4.3	0
Tony Curcillo	104	226	2.2	4
Walter Kelvay	56	132	2.4	0
Bernie Skvarka	31	120	3.9	1
Bob Koepnick	17	94	5.5	0
Douglas Goodsell	21	63	3.0	0

=== Passing ===
Player	Attempts	Completions	Interceptions	Comp %	Yards	TD	Rating
Tony Curcillo	133	58	11	43.6	912	6	99.6
Vic Janowicz	25	7	3	28.0	74	2	55.3
William Wilks	10	5	2	50.0	52	0	53.7

=== Receiving ===
Player	No.	Yards	Avg	TD
Robert Joslin	18	281	15.6	13
Ray Hamilton	13	185	14.2	2
Bob Grimes	9	164	18.2	1
Vic Janowicz	7	126	18.0	0
Bernie Skvarka	9	108	12.0	0
Ralph Armstrong	4	58	14.5	2
Douglas Goodsell	3	51	17.0	1
Walter Kelvay	5	48	9.6	0

== 1952 NFL draftees ==
Player	Round	Pick	Position	NFL club
Joe Campanella	3	36	Linebacker	Cleveland Browns
Vic Janowicz	7	79	Halfback	Washington Redskins
Sonny Gandee	9	106	Linebacker	Detroit Lions
Dick Logan	11	132	Guard	Cleveland Browns
Steve Ruzich	14	168	Guard	Cleveland Browns
Julius Wittman	15	175	Tackle	Washington Redskins
Dick Doyle	27	318	Defensive Back	Pittsburgh Steelers
Walt Klevay	29	348	Back	Cleveland Browns
