= 1951 Michigan Wolverines football team =

American college football season

1951 Michigan Wolverines football
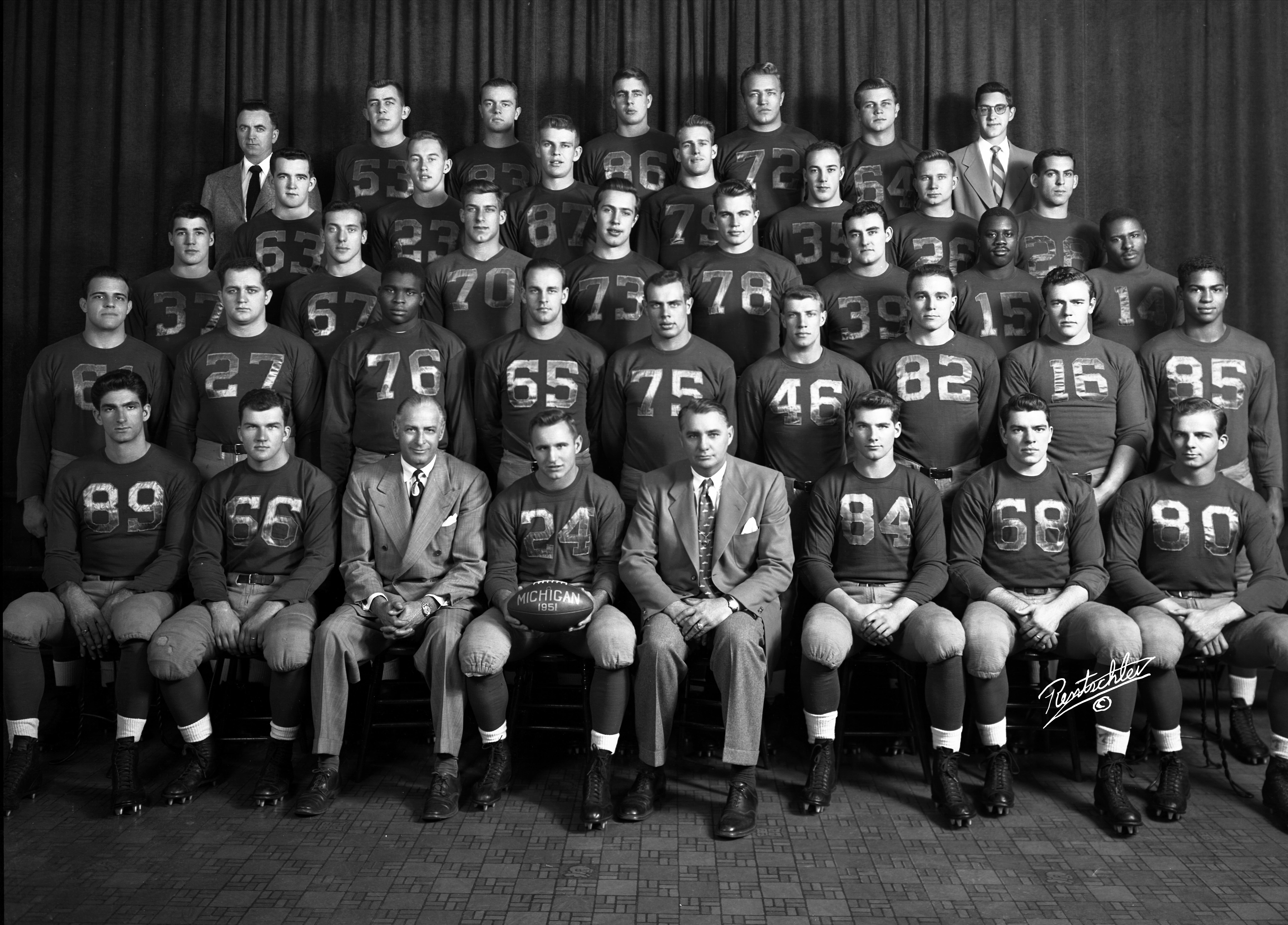
- Conference: Big Ten Conference
- Record: 4–5 (4–2 Big Ten)
- Head coach: Bennie Oosterbaan (4th season)
- MVP: Don Peterson
- Captain: Bill Putich
- Home stadium: Michigan Stadium

1951 Big Ten Conference football standings
| | Conf. | | | | | Overall |
| Team | W | | L | | T | W | | L | | T |
|---|---|---|---|---|---|---|---|---|---|---|
| No. 4 Illinois $ | 5 | – | 0 | – | 1 | 9 | – | 0 | – | 1 |
| Purdue | 4 | – | 1 | – | 0 | 5 | – | 4 | – | 0 |
| No. 8 Wisconsin | 5 | – | 1 | – | 1 | 7 | – | 1 | – | 1 |
| Michigan | 4 | – | 2 | – | 0 | 4 | – | 5 | – | 0 |
| Ohio State | 2 | – | 2 | – | 2 | 4 | – | 3 | – | 2 |
| Northwestern | 2 | – | 4 | – | 0 | 5 | – | 4 | – | 0 |
| Minnesota | 1 | – | 4 | – | 1 | 2 | – | 6 | – | 1 |
| Indiana | 1 | – | 5 | – | 0 | 2 | – | 7 | – | 0 |
| Iowa | 0 | – | 5 | – | 1 | 2 | – | 5 | – | 2 |
$ – Conference champion; Rankings from AP Poll

The 1951 Michigan Wolverines football team was an American football team that represented the University of Michigan as a member of the Big Ten Conference during the 1951 Big Ten season. In their fourth year under head coach Bennie Oosterbaan, the Wolverines compiled a 4–5 record (4–2 in conference games), finished in fourth place in the Big Ten, and outscored opponents by a total of 135 to 122. It was Michigan's first losing season since 1936 and the first since 1937 that Michigan was not ranked in the final AP poll. It was ranked at No. 29 in the final Litkenhous Ratings.

Senior left halfback/quarterback Bill Putich was the team captain and led the team in passing (390 yards, 41.6% completion percentage). Fullback Don Peterson received the team's most valuable player award and led the team in rushing (549 yards, 3.6 yards per carry). Halfback/safety Lowell Perry led the team in receiving (16 receptions for 395 yards) and was selected by the Central Press as a second-team player on the 1951 All-America team. Three Michigan players received first-team honors on the 1951 All-Big Ten Conference football team: Perry (AP-1, UP-1); offensive tackle Tom Johnson (AP-1, UP-1); and linebacker Roger Zatkoff (AP-1).

== Schedule ==
| Date | Opponent | Rank | Site | Result | Attendance | Source |
|---|---|---|---|---|---|---|
| September 29 | No. 2 Michigan State* | No. 17 | Michigan Stadium; Ann Arbor, MI (rivalry) | L 0–25 | 97,239 | |
| October 6 | Stanford* | | Michigan Stadium; Ann Arbor, MI | L 13–23 | 57,200 | |
| October 13 | Indiana | | Michigan Stadium; Ann Arbor, MI | W 33–14 | 61,100 | |
| October 20 | at Iowa | | Iowa Stadium; Iowa City, IA | W 21–0 | 53,050 | |
| October 27 | Minnesota^{†} | | Michigan Stadium; Ann Arbor, MI (Little Brown Jug) | W 54–27 | 86,200 | |
| November 3 | at No. 3 Illinois | No. 15 | Memorial Stadium; Champaign, IL (rivalry) | L 0–7 | 71,119 | |
| November 10 | at Cornell* | | Schoellkopf Field; Ithaca, NY | L 7–20 | 35,300 | |
| November 17 | Northwestern | | Michigan Stadium; Ann Arbor, MI (rivalry) | L 0–6 | 58,300 | |
| November 24 | Ohio State | | Michigan Stadium; Ann Arbor, MI (rivalry) | W 7–0 | 95,000 | |
*Non-conference game; ^{†}Homecoming; Rankings from AP Poll released prior to the game

== Game summaries ==
=== Michigan State ===
Week 1: Michigan State at Michigan

| Team | 1 | 2 | 3 | 4 | Total |
|---|---|---|---|---|---|
| • Michigan St. | 0 | 6 | 13 | 6 | 25 |
| Michigan | 0 | 0 | 0 | 0 | 0 |

- Date: September 29
- Location: Michigan Stadium
  Ann Arbor, MI
- Game attendance: 97,239

On September 29, Michigan, ranked No. 17, lost to Michigan State, ranked No. 2, by a 25-0 score before a sellout crowd of 97,239 at Michigan Stadium in Ann Arbor. To that date, it was the most decisive victory for Michigan State in the history of the Michigan–Michigan State football rivalry. The Spartans limited the Wolverines to 26 passing yards, a net loss of 23 rushing yards, and four first downs. The Detroit Free Press called it "as feeble an attack as any team in Michigan's proud football history ever displayed." The Spartans tallied 21 first downs, 249 rushing yards, 58 passing yards, and four touchdowns.

=== Stanford ===
Week 2: Stanford at Michigan

| Team | 1 | 2 | 3 | 4 | Total |
|---|---|---|---|---|---|
| • Stanford | 0 | 20 | 3 | 0 | 23 |
| Michigan | 6 | 0 | 7 | 0 | 13 |

- Date: October 6
- Location: Michigan Stadium, Ann Arbor, MI
- Game attendance: 57,200

On October 6, Michigan lost to Stanford, 23–13, before a sparse crowd of 57,200 at Michigan Stadium in Ann Arbor. Michigan scored first on a six-yard run by Lowell Perry, but Stanford seized momentum in the second quarter with three touchdowns, including a scoring reception by All-America end Bill McColl. Quarterback Bill Putich connected on a 35-yard pass to Fred Pickard to set up another Michigan touchdown, but the Wolverines were unable to overcome the second-quarter deficit. Perry was Michigan’s standout on offense, while McColl’s performance (seven receptions for 142 yards) drew national attention as a key factor in Stanford’s upset victory. The defeat marked a rare home loss for head coach Bennie Oosterbaan.

Michigan tallied 177 rushing yards, led by Bill Putich with 79 yards. In the air, the Wolverines completed ony four of 17 passes for 77 yards. Putich completed three of 12 passes for 60 yards. Stanford rushed for 167 yards and completed 13 of 21 passes for 209 yards. The Wolverines lost the first two games of the season for the first time since 1937.

=== Indiana ===
Week 3: Indiana at Michigan

| Team | 1 | 2 | 3 | 4 | Total |
|---|---|---|---|---|---|
| Indiana | 0 | 7 | 0 | 7 | 14 |
| • Michigan | 13 | 7 | 6 | 7 | 33 |

- Date: October 13
- Location: Michigan Stadium, Ann Arbor, MI
- Game attendance: 61,100

On October 13, Michigan defeated Indiana, 33–14, before a homecoming crowd of more than 61,100 at Michigan Stadium. The Wolverines scored five touchdowns, including a six-yard run by Lowell Perry, a short plunge from Don Peterson, and passing plays set up by quarterback Bill Putich. Indiana capitalized on turnovers for both of its touchdowns but was unable to slow Michigan’s balanced attack. Perry starred as both a runner and receiver, while Peterson added steady gains on the ground. The victory, coming after back-to-back losses to Michigan State and Stanford, was described as a much-needed rebound for Oosterbaan’s team, with the Free Press noting the lively homecoming atmosphere in Ann Arbor.

The Wolverines tallied 197 passing yards and 124 rushing yards, while holding the Hoosiers to 66 passing yards and 192 rushing yards.

=== At Iowa ===
Week 4: Michigan at Iowa

| Team | 1 | 2 | 3 | 4 | Total |
|---|---|---|---|---|---|
| • Michigan | 7 | 7 | 7 | 0 | 21 |
| Iowa | 0 | 0 | 0 | 0 | 0 |

- Date: October 20
- Location: Iowa Stadium, Iowa City, IA
- Game attendance: 53,050

On October 20, Michigan defeated Iowa, 21–0, before a crowd of 53,050, an all-time attendance record at at Iowa Stadium in Iowa City, Iowa. Don Peterson scored two touchdowns, and Bill Putich scored one. Russ Rescoria converted all three kicks for extra point. Iowa out-gained Michigan by 310 yards (251 rushing, 59 passing) to 219 yards (145 rushing, 74 passing).

=== Minnesota ===
Week 5: Minnesota at Michigan

| Team | 1 | 2 | 3 | 4 | Total |
|---|---|---|---|---|---|
| Minnesota | 7 | 13 | 7 | 0 | 27 |
| • Michigan | 14 | 14 | 14 | 12 | 54 |

- Date: October 27
- Location: Michigan Stadium, Ann Arbor, MI
- Game attendance: 86,200

On October 27, Michigan defeated Minnesota, 54–27, in the Little Brown Jug rivalry game before a crowd of 86,200 at Michigan Stadium. Michigan's 54 points was the most scored against Minnesota by any Big Ten team in history. Highlights of the high-scoring game included:

- Minnesota's Ron Engel returned the opening kickoff 94 yards for a touchdown.
- Michigan's Wes Bradford ran 49 yards for a touchdown to tie the score 47 seconds after the Gophers' touchdown.
- Michigan end Fred Picard recovered a Minnesota fumble at the Gophers' 37-yard line. Bill Putich completed five passes on the ensuing drive and ran 12 yards for a touchdown to give the Wolverines a 14-7 lead.
- On the first play of the second quarter, Minnesota blocked a Michigan punt and recovered the loose ball in the end zone to tie the score at 14-14.
- Michigan end Merritt Green recovered a Minnesota fumble at the 22-yard line, and Bradford scored his second touchdown on a three-yard run.
- Lowell Perry returned a punt for a touchdown to give Michigan a 28-14 lead.
- In the final minute of the first half, Minnesota scored as tailback Paul Giel passed to Martin Engh who lateraled to Don Swanson with Swanson scoring. Minnesota missed the extra point, and Michigan led, 28-20, at halftime.
- On the first series of the second half, Perry scored on a 71-yard pass play from Ted Topor.
- Still in the third quarter, Perry scored again on a pass from Topor, this one covering 88 yards.
- In the fourth quarter, Putich passed to Pickard for 55 yards and a touchdown.

Michigan gained 427 yards (224 rushing, 203 passing) in the game. Minnesota gained 394 yards (249 passing, 145 rushing).

=== At Illinois ===
Week 6: Michigan at Illinois

| Team | 1 | 2 | 3 | 4 | Total |
|---|---|---|---|---|---|
| Michigan | 0 | 0 | 0 | 0 | 0 |
| • Illinois | 0 | 0 | 0 | 7 | 7 |

- Date: November 3
- Location: Memorial Stadium, Champaign, IL
- Game attendance: 71,119
- Game weather: Blizzard
- Big Ten Network: Michigan at Illinois, 1951

On November 3, Michigan lost to Big Ten champion Illinois, 7–0, before a crowd of 71,119 at Memorial Stadium in Champaign, Illinois. The game was played in a blizzard with winds gusting to 50 Miles an hour at times. Through the first 58 minutes, neither team was able to score in the difficult weather conditions. Late in the fourth quarter, Illinois drove 83 yards. With 70 seconds remaining in the game, quarterback Tommy O'Connell threw a six-yard touchdown pass to right end Rex Smith in the end zone. Wilfrid Smith of the Chicago Tribune described Illinois' fourth-quarter drive as "one of the most glorious rallies in this 50 year rivalry."

=== At Cornell ===
Week 7: Michigan at Cornell

| Team | 1 | 2 | 3 | 4 | Total |
|---|---|---|---|---|---|
| Michigan | 0 | 7 | 0 | 0 | 7 |
| • Cornell | 0 | 0 | 13 | 7 | 20 |

- Date: November 10
- Location: Schoellkopf Field, Ithaca, NY
- Game attendance: 35,300

On November 10, Michigan lost to Cornell, 20–7, before a Schoellkopf Field record crowd of 35,300 in Ithaca. Michigan led 7–0 at halftime on a 43-yard touchdown pass from quarterback Bill Putich to end Fred Pickard, but Cornell rallied for 20 unanswered points in the second half. Backup quarterback Jack Jaeckel directed two third-quarter touchdown drives, and the Big Red added a fourth-quarter score to seal the upset. Cornell’s defense held Michigan to 39 rushing yards and intercepted three passes. Contemporary accounts praised Cornell’s comeback as one of the program’s finest moments of the decade, while Michigan head coach Bennie Oosterbaan pointed to turnovers and second-half breakdowns as decisive.

=== Northwestern ===
Week 8: Northwestern at Michigan

| Team | 1 | 2 | 3 | 4 | Total |
|---|---|---|---|---|---|
| • Northwestern | 0 | 7 | 0 | 0 | 7 |
| Michigan | 0 | 0 | 0 | 0 | 0 |

- Date: November 17
- Location: Michigan Stadium, Ann Arbor, MI
- Game attendance: 58,300

On November 17, Michigan lost to Northwestern, 6–0, before a crowd of 58,300 at Michigan Stadium. The only scoring of the game came early in the second quarter after Michigan halfback Frankie Howell fumbled on an attempted reverse. Northwestern recovered the loose ball near midfield and scored on a 17-yard run by fullback Chuck Hren. The extra point kick was blocked by Don Peterson. Michigan tallied 244 rushing yards, but the Wolverines threw as many interceptions (five) as they did complete passes. In addition to the five interceptions, Michigan also turned the ball over two times on fumbles.

The loss eliminated Michigan from contention for the Big Ten title that they had won or shared each of the previous four seasons. It was Michigan's fifth loss of the season, the most losses suffered by a Michigan team since the 1936 team lost seven games.

=== Ohio State ===
| Team | 1 | 2 | 3 | 4 | Total |
|---|---|---|---|---|---|
| Ohio St | 0 | 0 | 0 | 0 | 0 |
| • Michigan | 0 | 7 | 0 | 0 | 7 |

- Date: November 24
- Location: Michigan Stadium, Ann Arbor, MI
- Game attendance: 95,000

On November 24, Michigan and Ohio State faced off before a crowd of 95,000 at Michigan Stadium in a rare instance where neither of the rivals was ranked in the AP or UP polls. The only scoring of the game came on a 49-yard Michigan drive late in the second quarter, culminating with a six-yard touchdown run by fullback Don Peterson and a successful extra-point kick by Russ Rescoria. One play before Peterson scored, Michigan's Don Zanfagna caught a pass at the six-yard line; Zanfagna was hit hard, causing the ball to bounce from his arms with Buckeyes' guard Steve Ruzich recovering the ball, but the officials ruled that Zanfagna was down before he lost the ball.

Ohio State turned the ball over four times on fumbles. The Buckeyes never moved the ball inside Michigan's 20-yard line and were held to 222 yards (120 rushing, 102 passing). Michigan gained only 215 yards (135 rushing, 80 passing). Michigan's senior halfback and team captain Bill Putich, an east Cleveland native playing his last game for the Wolverines, was described as a "workhorse", completing 10 of 21 passes for 64 yards and carrying the ball 14 times for 30 yards. After the game, Woody Hayes summed up the game: "You've got to play your best ball to beat Michigan. We didn't. That's all."

== Statistical leaders ==
Michigan's individual statistical leaders for the 1951 season include those listed below.

=== Rushing ===
| Player | Attempts | Net yards | Yards per attempt | Touchdowns |
|---|---|---|---|---|
| Don Peterson | 152 | 549 | 3.6 | 4 |
| Wes Bradford | 64 | 348 | 5.4 | 2 |
| Bill Putich | 115 | 268 | 2.3 | 3 |

=== Passing ===
| Player | Attempts | Completions | Interceptions | Comp % | Yards | Yds/Comp | TD | Long |
|---|---|---|---|---|---|---|---|---|
| Bill Putich | 77 | 32 | 7 | 41.6 | 390 | 12.2 | 2 | 55 |
| Don Peterson | 13 | 6 | 3 | 46.1 | 184 | 30.7 | 1 | 43 |
| Ted Topor | 26 | 9 | 2 | 34.6 | 171 | 19.0 | 2 | 71 |

=== Receiving ===
| Player | Receptions | Yards | Yds/Recp | TD | Long |
|---|---|---|---|---|---|
| Lowell Perry | 16 | 395 | 24.7 | 3 | 71 |
| Frederick Pickard | 10 | 204 | 20.4 | 2 | 55 |
| Ted Topor | 9 | 81 | 9.0 | 0 | |

=== Kickoff returns ===
| Player | Returns | Yards | Yds/Return | TD | Long |
|---|---|---|---|---|---|
| Bill Putich | 3 | 88 | 29.3 | 0 | 36 |
| Ted Topor | 3 | 72 | 24.0 | 0 | 27 |
| Don Oldham | 3 | 52 | 17.3 | 0 | |

=== Punt returns ===
| Player | Returns | Yards | Yds/Return | TD | Long |
|---|---|---|---|---|---|
| Lowell Perry | 17 | 197 | 11.6 | 1 | 75 |
| Bill Putich | 11 | 71 | 6.5 | 0 | 0 |
| Merritt Green | 1 | 10 | 10.0 | 0 | 10 |

== Personnel ==
=== Letter winners ===
HB/QB and captain Bill Putich

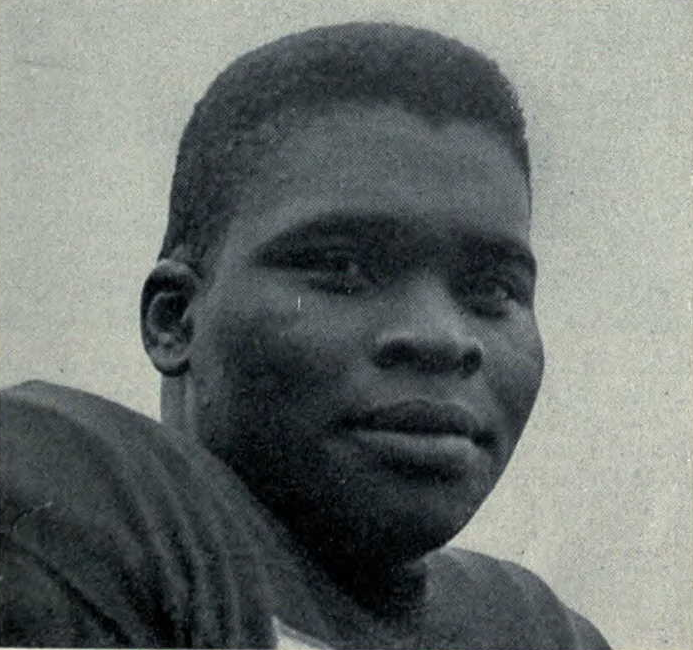
OT/DT Tom Johnson

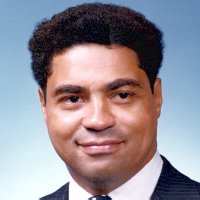
End/safety Lowell Perry

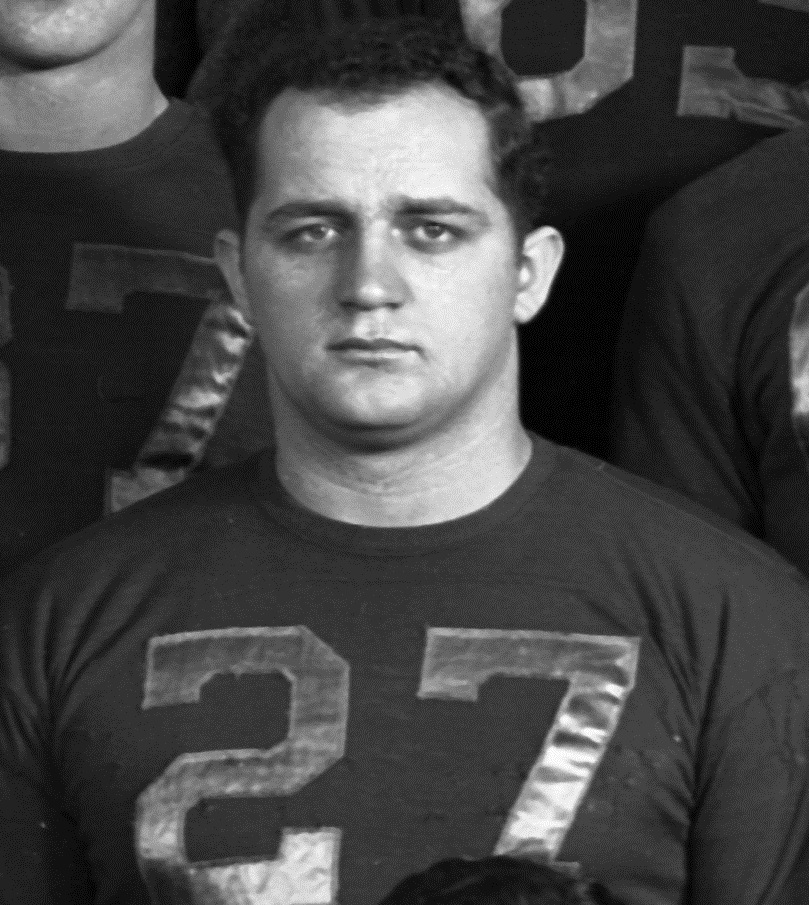
QB/LB Ted Topor

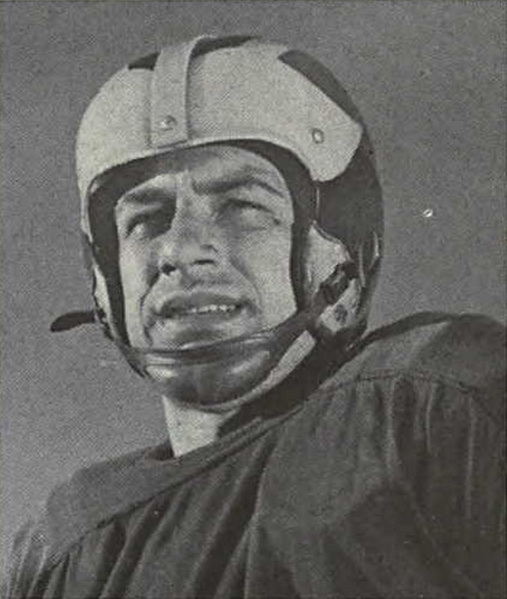
LB Roger Zatkoff

The following 36 players received varsity letters for their participation on the 1951 team. Players who started at least four games are shown with their names in bold.

- James T. Balog, 6'3", 210 pounds, sophomore, Wheaton, IL - tackle
- Bruce A. Bartholomew, 6'3", 200 pounds, junior, Detroit - tackle
- Richard A. Beison, 6'0", 200 pounds, sophomore, East Chicago, IN - guard
- Donald C. Bennett, 6'2", 195 pounds, sophomore, Chicago - center
- William E. Billings, 5'11", 180 pounds, junior, Flint, MI - quarterback
- **Wes Bradford**, 5'6", 155 pounds, junior, Troy, OH – started 6 games at right halfback
- Robert W. Dingman, 6'0", 180 pounds, senior, Saginaw, MI - end
- **Donald R. Dugger**, 5'10", 180 pounds, junior, Charleston, WV – started 5 games at defensive left guard, 1 game at offensive left guard
- **Merritt Green**, 6'0", 180 pounds, junior, Toledo, OH – started 9 games at defensive left end
- Frank Howell, 5'8", 160 pounds, junior, Muskegon Heights, MI - running back
- **Tom Johnson**, 6'2", 227 pounds, Muskegon Heights, MI – started 9 games at left tackle (offense and defense)
- Ray Thomas Kelsey, 6'2", 195 pounds, senior, Lakewood, OH - guard
- **Peter Kinyon**, 5'11", 190 pounds, senior, Ann Arbor, MI – started 7 games at offensive left guard, 1 game at offensive right guard
- Eugene Knutson, 6'4", 210 pounds, sophomore, Beloit, WI - end
- Laurence LeClaire, 6'0", 190 pounds, junior, Anaconda, MT - fullback
- Robert Matheson, Detroit - guard
- Duncan McDonald, 6'0", 175 pounds, freshman, Flint, MI - quarterback
- **Don Oldham**, 5'9", 166 pounds, junior, Indianapolis – started 7 games at defensive back, 1 game at left halfback
- **Dick O'Shaughnessy**, 5'11", 190 pounds, sophomore, Seaford, NY – started 9 games at center
- **Russ Osterman**, 5'11", 170 pounds, senior, Baraga, MI – started 9 games at defensive right end
- **Ben Pederson**, 6'2", 215 pounds, junior, Marquette, MI – started 8 games at right tackle
- **Lowell Perry**, 6'0", 178 pounds, junior, Ypsilanti, MI – started 8 games at offensive left end, 1 game at right halfback, 3 games at safety
- **Don Peterson**, 5'11", 175 pounds, senior, Racine, MI – started 7 games at fullback
- **Fred Pickard**, 6'2", 190 pounds, senior, Grand Rapids, MI – started 8 games at offensive right end
- **Bill Putich**, 5'9", 170 pounds, senior, Cleveland, OH – started 6 games at left halfback, 2 games at quarterback, 6 games at safety
- Russell G. Rescorla, 6'0", 180 pounds, junior, Grand Haven, MI - fullback
- Leo Schlicht, 6'4", 210 pounds, freshman, Madison, WI - fullback
- Thad Stanford, 6'0", 170 pounds, sophomore, Midland, MI - end
- **Ralph Stribe**, 6'1", 200 pounds, junior, Detroit – started 7 games at offensive right tackle
- **Robert Timm**, 5'11", 185 pounds, junior, Toledo, OH – started 9 games at defensive right guard
- **David Tinkham**, 5'10", 170 pounds, junior, East Grand Rapids, MI – started 9 games at defensive back, 2 games at left halfback
- **Ted Topor**, 6'1", 215 pounds, junior, East Chicago, IN – started 7 games at quarterback, 8 games at linebacker
- Thomas Witherspoon, 5'11", 177 pounds, junior, Detroit – started 1 game at fullback
- **Jim Wolter**, 6'0", 190 pounds, senior, Ypsilanti, MI – started 8 games at offensive right guard, 1 game at offensive left guard
- Donald M. Zanfagna, 5'10", 175 pounds, sophomore, Providence, RI
- **Roger Zatkoff**, 6'2", 210 pounds, junior, Hamtramck, MI – started 9 games at linebacker, 1 game at fullback

=== Coaching staff ===
Michigan's 1951 coaching, training, and support staff included the following persons.

- Head coach: Bennie Oosterbaan
- Assistant coaches:

- Jack Blott - line coach
- George Ceithaml - backfield coach
- Cliff Keen - head wrestling coach and assistant football coach
- Ernest McCoy - head basketball coach and chief football scout
- Bill Orwig - end coach
- Don Robinson - junior varsity coach and scout
- Wally Weber - freshman coach
- J. T. White - assistant line coach

- Trainer: Jim Hunt
- Manager: Leon Stock

== Awards and honors ==
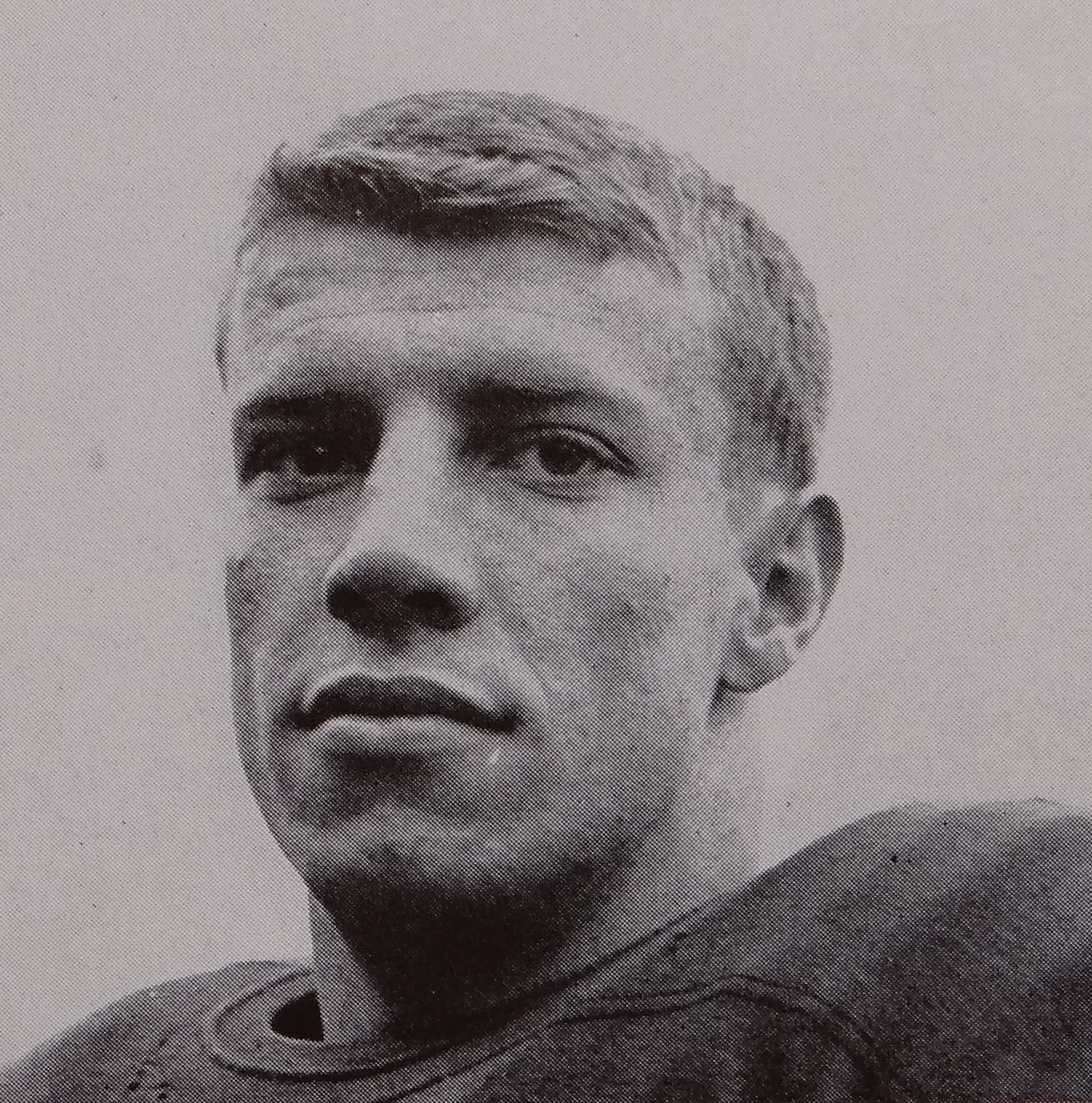
FB and MVP Don Peterson

Honors and awards for the 1951 season went to the following individuals:

- Captain: Bill Putich
- 1951 All-America college football team: Lowell Perry (UP third team, Central Press second team), Tom Johnson (Chicago Tribune 1st-team)
- All-Big Ten: Lowell Perry (AP and UP), Tom Johnson (AP and UP), Roger Zatkoff (AP)
- Most Valuable Player: Don Peterson
- Meyer Morton Award: Merritt Greene
