= 1951 Illinois Fighting Illini football team =

American college football season

1951 Illinois Fighting Illini football

Co-national champion (Boand) Big Ten champion Rose Bowl champion

Rose Bowl, W 40–7 vs. Stanford
- Conference: Big Ten Conference

Ranking
- Coaches: No. 3
- AP: No. 4
- Record: 9–0–1 (5–0–1 Big Ten)
- Head coach: Ray Eliot (10th season)
- MVP: Chuck Boerio
- Captain: Chuck Studley
- Home stadium: Memorial Stadium

1951 Big Ten Conference football standings
	Conf.					Overall
Team	W		L		T	W		L		T
No. 4 Illinois $	5	–	0	–	1	9	–	0	–	1
Purdue	4	–	1	–	0	5	–	4	–	0
No. 8 Wisconsin	5	–	1	–	1	7	–	1	–	1
Michigan	4	–	2	–	0	4	–	5	–	0
Ohio State	2	–	2	–	2	4	–	3	–	2
Northwestern	2	–	4	–	0	5	–	4	–	0
Minnesota	1	–	4	–	1	2	–	6	–	1
Indiana	1	–	5	–	0	2	–	7	–	0
Iowa	0	–	5	–	1	2	–	5	–	2
$ – Conference champion; Rankings from AP Poll

The 1951 Illinois Fighting Illini football team was an American football team that represented the University of Illinois as a member of the Big Ten Conference during the 1951 Big Ten season. In their 10th year under head coach Ray Eliot, the Fighting Illini compiled a 9–0–1 record (5–0–1 in conference games), won the Big Ten championship, and outscored opponents by a total of 220 to 83. The lone setback was a scoreless tie with Ohio State. The Illini concluded the season with a 40–7 over Stanford in the 1952 Rose Bowl, the first nationally televised college football game. They were ranked No. 4 in the final AP poll. The team was named co-national champion by Boand, which split its selection with Georgia Tech.

Defensive back Al Brosky set an NCAA career record 29 interceptions, including an NCAA record 15-game streak covering the entire 1951 season. He was inducted into the College Football Hall of Fame in 1998.

Halfback Johnny Karras was a consensus first-team pick on the 1951 All-America team. Linebacker Chuck Boerio was selected as the team's most valuable player. Six Illinois players received honors on the 1951 All-Big Ten Conference football team: Karras (AP-1, UP-1); Boerio (AP-1, UP-1); Brosky (AP-1); tackle Chuck Ulrich (AP-1, UP-1); Chuck Studley (AP-1, UP-1); and end Rex Smith (AP-1).

The team played its home games at Memorial Stadium in Champaign, Illinois.

== Schedule ==
Date	Opponent	Rank	Site	Result	Attendance	Source
September 29	UCLA*	No. 10	Memorial Stadium; Champaign, IL	W 27–13	53,265	
October 6	Wisconsin	No. 8	Memorial Stadium; Champaign, IL	W 14–10	56,207	
October 13	at Syracuse*	No. 7	Archbold Stadium; Syracuse, NY	W 41–20	30,000	
October 20	at No. 20 Washington*	No. 8	Husky Stadium; Seattle, WA	W 27–20	54,000	
October 27	at Indiana	No. 4	Memorial Stadium; Bloomington, IN (rivalry)	W 21–0	33,000	
November 3	No. 15 Michigan	No. 3	Memorial Stadium; Champaign, IL (rivalry)	W 7–0	71,119	
November 10	Iowa^{†}	No. 2	Memorial Stadium; Champaign, IL	W 40–13	56,444	
November 17	at Ohio State	No. 3	Ohio Stadium; Columbus, OH (Illibuck)	T 0–0	79,457	
November 24	at Northwestern	No. 6	Dyche Stadium; Evanston, IL (rivalry)	W 3–0	52,000	
January 1	No. 7 Stanford*	No. 4	Rose Bowl; Pasadena, CA (Rose Bowl)	W 40–7	96,825	
*Non-conference game; ^{†}Homecoming; Rankings from AP Poll released prior to the game

== Game summaries ==
=== Michigan ===
Team	1	2	3	4	Total
Michigan	0	0	0	0	0
• Illinois	0	0	0	7	7

- Date: November 3
- Location: Memorial Stadium, Champaign, IL
- Game attendance: 71,119
- Game weather: Blizzard
- Big Ten Network: Michigan at Illinois, 1951

On November 3, Illinois defeated Michigan, 7–0, before a crowd of 71,119 at Memorial Stadium in Champaign, Illinois. The game was played in a blizzard with winds gusting to 50 Miles an hour at times. Through the first 58 minutes, neither team was able to score in the difficult weather conditions. Late in the fourth quarter, Illinois drove 83 yards. With 70 seconds remaining in the game, quarterback Tommy O'Connell threw a six-yard touchdown pass to right end Rex Smith in the end zone. Wilfrid Smith of the Chicago Tribune described Illinois' fourth-quarter drive as "one of the most glorious rallies in this 50 year rivalry."

=== Ohio State ===
Team	1	2	3	4	Total
Illinois	0	0	0	0	0
Ohio State	0	0	0	0	0

- Date: November 17
- Location: Ohio Stadium, Columbus, OH
- Game attendance: 79,457

On November 17, Illinois played unranked Ohio State to a scoreless tie before a homecoming crowd of 79,457 in Columbus, Ohio. In the fourth quarter, Illinois drove to Ohio State's 13-yard line, but Ohio State defensive halfback Fred Bruney intercepted a Tom O'Connell pass at the goal line to end the threat. Ohio State gained a net of 191 yards to 167 for Illinois.

== Personnel ==
=== Players ===
The following 40 players won varsity letters for their participation on the 1951 Illinois football team:

1. Peter Bachouros, fullback, junior, 5'10", 170 pounds, Chicago
2. John Bauer, guard/tackle, sophomore, 6'3", 229 pounds, Benton, IL
3. James Baughman, tackle, sophomore, 6'0", 212 pounds, Pontiac, IL
4. Marv Berschet, tackle, senior, 6'2", 207 pounds, Arlington Heights, IL
5. Chuck Boerio, center, senior, 5'11", 191 pounds, Kincaid, IL
6. Herbert Borman, center, sophomore, 6'0", 183 pounds, Downers Grove, IL
7. Al Brosky, halfback, junior, 5'11", 172 pounds, Chicago
8. Joseph Cole, center, senior, 6'2", 201 pounds, Park Ridge, IL
9. Marshall Dusenbury, fullback, senior, 6'0", 191 pounds, Bradley, IL
10. Donald Engels, quarterback, senior, 6'2", 185 pounds, Chicago
11. Donald W. Ernst, center, sophomore, 6'0", 182 pounds, Chicago
12. Donald Gnidovic, guard, senior, 5'11", 190 pounds, LaSalle, IL
13. Richard Jenkins, tackle, senior, 6'2", 221 pounds, Chicago, IL
14. Johnny Karras, halfback, senior, 5'11", 173 pounds, Argo, IL
15. George Kasap, tackle, senior, 5'11", 217 pounds, Oglesby, IL
16. Robert Lenzini, guard, sophomore, 6'0", 196 pounds, North Chicago, IL
17. Kenneth Miller, halfback, sophomore, 6'2", 191 pounds, Bloomington, IL
18. Thomas Murphy, guard, junior, 5'11", 189 pounds, Chicago
19. Herbert Neathery, halfback, senior, 6'0", 179 pounds, Hoopeston, IL
20. Stephen Nosek, end, junior, 6'0", 195 pounds, Chicago
21. Tommy O'Connell, quarterback, sophomore, 5'11", 184 pounds, Chicago
22. Daniel Peterson, tackle, senior, 6'3", 190 pounds, Elmwood Park, IL
23. Elie Popa, fullback, senior, 5'10", 183 pounds, Canton, OH
24. Sammy Rebecca, quarterback, senior
25. John Ryan, end, sophomore
26. Robert Rylowicz, halfback, senior
27. Daniel Sabino, center, junior
28. Rex Smith, end, junior, 6'2", 199 pounds, Chicago
29. Donald Stevens, halfback, senior
30. Lawrence Stevens, end, junior
31. Chuck Studley, guard and captain, senior, 5'11", 191 pounds, Pontiac, MI
32. Donald Tate, fullback, sophomore, 6'0", 200 pounds, New Castle, PA
33. Bill Tate, fullback, junior, 6'1", 188 pounds, Mattoon, IL
34. Chuck Ulrich, tackle, senior, 6'4", 219 pounds, Chicago
35. Rudolph Valentino, guard, senior, 5'10", 196 pounds, East Chicago, IN
36. Joseph Vernasco, end, senior, 6'1", 194 pounds, Mishawaka, IN
37. Clifford Waldbeser, end, sophomore, 6'1", 189 pounds, Morton, IL
38. Stanley Wallace, halfback, sophomore, 6'3", 193 pounds, Hillsboro, IL
39. Robert Weddell, tackle, junior, 6'2", 212 pounds, Webster Groves, MO
40. Frank Wodziak, end, junior, 6'1", 189 pounds, Chicago

=== Coaching staff ===
- Head coach: Ray Eliot
- Assistant coaches

- Burt Ingwersen (line coach)
- Bob King (asst. line coach)
- Ralph Fletcher (backfield coach)name=ing/>
- Chuck Purvis (asst. line coach)
- Mel Brewer (centers coach)
- Lou Agase (scout and junior varsity coach)

== Statistics ==
During the nine-game regular season, the Illini gained 2,785 yards of total offense with 1,837 rushing yards and 948 passing yards. On defense, they gave up 1,954 yards of total offense on 987 passing yards and 967 rushing yards. The team's individual statistical leaders included:

- Halfback Johnny Karras gained 592 rushing yards and 164 receiving yards and scored 12 touchdowns. Halfback Don Stevens led the team with an average of 6.2 yards per rushing carry on 62 carries for 383 yards.
- Sophomore quarterback Tommy O'Connell completed 56 of 106 passes for 625 yards and six touchdowns.
- End Rex Smith was the team's leading receiver with 21 passes for 331 yards and one touchdown. Joe Vernasco ranked second with 11 receptions for 220 yards and four touchdowns.
- Sophomore punter Ken Miller kicked for an average of 36.2 yards on 50 punts.

== Awards and honors ==
Halfback Johnny Karras was a consensus first-team selection on the 1951 All-America team. He received first-team honors from the Associated Press (AP), United Press (UP), American Football Coaches Association (AFCA), Football Writers Association of America (FWAA), and All-America Board (AAB). Other Illini receiving All-America honor in 1951 were:

- Al Brosky - first-team honors from the AP on its offensive team and first-team honors from the FWAA on their defensive team as a safety
- Chuck Ulrich - first-team honors from the AP on its offensive team at tackle
- Chuck Boerio - first-team honors from the Newspaper Enterprise Association (NEA) on its defensive team; second-team honors from the UP at center

Six Illinois players received first-team honors on the 1951 All-Big Ten Conference football team: Karras (AP-1, UP-1); Ulrich (AP-1, UP-1); Boerio (AP-1, UP-1); guard Chuck Studley (AP-1, UP-1); end Rex Smith (AP-1); and defensive back Al Brosky (AP-1).

Boerio received the team award as most valuable player, and Studley was chosen as the team captain.

Fullback Bill Tate rushed for 150 yards and scored two touchdowns in the 1952 Rose Bowl and was selected as the game's most valuable player.
