= 1951 Minnesota Golden Gophers football team =

American college football season

1951 Minnesota Golden Gophers football
- Conference: Big Ten Conference
- Record: 2–6–1 (1–4–1 Big Ten)
- Head coach: Wes Fesler (1st season)
- MVP: Ron Engel
- Captain: Wayne Robinson
- Home stadium: Memorial Stadium

1951 Big Ten Conference football standings
	Conf.					Overall
Team	W		L		T	W		L		T
No. 4 Illinois $	5	–	0	–	1	9	–	0	–	1
Purdue	4	–	1	–	0	5	–	4	–	0
No. 8 Wisconsin	5	–	1	–	1	7	–	1	–	1
Michigan	4	–	2	–	0	4	–	5	–	0
Ohio State	2	–	2	–	2	4	–	3	–	2
Northwestern	2	–	4	–	0	5	–	4	–	0
Minnesota	1	–	4	–	1	2	–	6	–	1
Indiana	1	–	5	–	0	2	–	7	–	0
Iowa	0	–	5	–	1	2	–	5	–	2
$ – Conference champion; Rankings from AP Poll

The 1951 Minnesota Golden Gophers football team represented the University of Minnesota in the 1951 Big Ten Conference football season. In their first year under head coach Wes Fesler, the Golden Gophers compiled a 2–6–1 record and were outscored by their opponents by a combined total of 258 to 162. The team was ranked at No. 75 in the 1951 Litkenhous Ratings.

No Golden Gophers players were named any major awards, All-American, Academic All-American, All-Big Ten or Academic All-Big Ten. It was the last season that no Golden Gopher players achieved any of the awards. Halfback Ron Engel was awarded the Team MVP Award.

Total attendance for the season was 255,851, which averaged to 51,170. The season high for attendance was against Nebraska.

== Schedule ==
Date	Opponent	Site	Result	Attendance	Source
September 29	No. 8 Washington*	Memorial Stadium; Minneapolis, MN	L 20-25	51,148	
October 6	at No. 2 California*	California Memorial Stadium; Berkeley, CA	L 14–55	69,000	
October 13	Northwestern	Memorial Stadium; Minneapolis, MN	L 7–21	51,915	
October 20	Nebraska*^{†}	Memorial Stadium; Minneapolis, MN (rivalry)	W 39–20	54,625	
October 27	at Michigan	Michigan Stadium; Ann Arbor, MI (Little Brown Jug)	L 27–54	83,060	
November 3	at Iowa	Iowa Stadium; Iowa City, IA (rivalry)	T 20–20	40,000	
November 10	Indiana	Memorial Stadium; Minneapolis, MN	W 16–14	45,986	
November 17	at Purdue	Ross–Ade Stadium; West Lafayette, IN	L 13–19	29,000	
November 24	No. 8 Wisconsin	Memorial Stadium; Minneapolis, MN (rivalry)	L 6–30	52,177	
*Non-conference game; ^{†}Homecoming; Rankings from AP Poll released prior to the game
