= 1951 Wisconsin Badgers football team =

American college football season

1951 Wisconsin Badgers football
- Conference: Big Ten Conference

Ranking
- Coaches: No. 8
- AP: No. 8
- Record: 7–1–1 (5–1–1 Big Ten)
- Head coach: Ivy Williamson (3rd season)
- MVP: Hal Faverty
- Captain: Jim Hammond
- Home stadium: Camp Randall Stadium

1951 Big Ten Conference football standings
	Conf.					Overall
Team	W		L		T	W		L		T
No. 4 Illinois $	5	–	0	–	1	9	–	0	–	1
Purdue	4	–	1	–	0	5	–	4	–	0
No. 8 Wisconsin	5	–	1	–	1	7	–	1	–	1
Michigan	4	–	2	–	0	4	–	5	–	0
Ohio State	2	–	2	–	2	4	–	3	–	2
Northwestern	2	–	4	–	0	5	–	4	–	0
Minnesota	1	–	4	–	1	2	–	6	–	1
Indiana	1	–	5	–	0	2	–	7	–	0
Iowa	0	–	5	–	1	2	–	5	–	2
$ – Conference champion; Rankings from AP Poll

The 1951 Wisconsin Badgers football team represented the University of Wisconsin in the 1951 Big Ten Conference football season. Led by third-year head coach Ivy Williamson, the Badgers compiled an overall record of 7–1–1 with a mark of 5–1–1 in conference play, placing third in the Big Ten. Hal Faverty was the team's MVP and Jim Hammond was team captain.

== Schedule ==
Date	Opponent	Rank	Site	Result	Attendance	Source
September 29	Marquette*	No. 15	Camp Randall Stadium; Madison, WI	W 22–6	45,450	
October 6	at No. 8 Illinois		Memorial Stadium; Champaign, IL	L 10–14	56,207	
October 13	No. 9 Ohio State		Camp Randall Stadium; Madison, WI	T 6–6	51,156	
October 20	at Purdue		Ross–Ade Stadium; West Lafayette, IN	W 31–7	40,000	
October 27	at No. 13 Northwestern	No. 14	Dyche Stadium; Evanston, IL	W 41–0	50,000	
November 3	Indiana^{†}	No. 10	Camp Randall Stadium; Madison, WI	W 6–0	51,118	
November 10	Penn	No. 9	Camp Randall Stadium; Madison, WI	W 16–7	43,243	
November 17	Iowa	No. 8	Camp Randall Stadium; Madison, WI (rivalry)	W 34–7	39,788	
November 24	at Minnesota	No. 8	Memorial Stadium; Minneapolis, MN (rivalry)	W 30–6	52,177	
*Non-conference game; ^{†}Homecoming; Rankings from AP Poll released prior to the game
