= 1951 Iowa Hawkeyes football team =

American college football season

1951 Iowa Hawkeyes football
- Conference: Big Ten Conference
- Record: 2–5–2 (0–5–1 Big Ten)
- Head coach: Leonard Raffensperger (2nd season)
- MVP: Bill Reichardt
- Home stadium: Iowa Stadium

1951 Big Ten Conference football standings
	Conf.					Overall
Team	W		L		T	W		L		T
No. 4 Illinois $	5	–	0	–	1	9	–	0	–	1
Purdue	4	–	1	–	0	5	–	4	–	0
No. 8 Wisconsin	5	–	1	–	1	7	–	1	–	1
Michigan	4	–	2	–	0	4	–	5	–	0
Ohio State	2	–	2	–	2	4	–	3	–	2
Northwestern	2	–	4	–	0	5	–	4	–	0
Minnesota	1	–	4	–	1	2	–	6	–	1
Indiana	1	–	5	–	0	2	–	7	–	0
Iowa	0	–	5	–	1	2	–	5	–	2
$ – Conference champion; Rankings from AP Poll

The 1951 Iowa Hawkeyes football team was an American football team that represented the University of Iowa as a member of the Big Ten Conference during the 1951 Big Ten football season. In their second and final season under head coach Leonard Raffensperger, the Hawkeyes compiled a 2–5–2 record (0–5–1 in conference games), finished in last place in the Big Ten, and were outscored by a total of 233 to 61. The team was ranked at No. 69 in the 1951 Litkenhous Ratings.

The 1951 Hawkeyes gained 1,692 rushing yards and 1,153 passing yards. On defense, they gave up 1,400 rushing yards and 1,508 passing yards.

Fullback Bill Reichardt wsa selected as Iowa's most valuable player and also won the Chicago Tribune Silver Football as the most valuable player in the Big Ten. Reichardt and offensive lineman Jerry Hilgenberg were later inducted into the Iowa Letterwinners Club Hall of Fame. The team's statistical leaders included Reichadt (737 rushing yards); Burt Britzmann (68-of-150 passing for 942 yards); Fred Ruck (25 receptions for 274 yards); and George Rice (54 points scored).

The team played its home games at Iowa Stadium in Iowa City, Iowa. Home attendance was 157,883, an average of 39,471 per game.

== Schedule ==
Date	Opponent	Site	Result	Attendance	Source
September 29	Kansas State*	Iowa Stadium; Iowa City, IA	W 16–0	29,700	
October 6	at Purdue	Ross–Ade Stadium; West Lafayette, IN	L 30–34	25,000	
October 13	Pittsburgh*	Iowa Stadium; Iowa City, IA	W 34–17	35,123	
October 20	Michigan^{†}	Iowa Stadium; Iowa City, IA	L 0–21	53,050	
October 27	at Ohio State	Ohio Stadium; Columbus, OH	L 21–47	67,551	
November 3	Minnesota	Iowa Stadium; Iowa City, IA (rivalry)	T 20–20	40,000	
November 10	at No. 2 Illinois	Memorial Stadium; Champaign, IL	L 13–40	56,444	
November 17	at No. 8 Wisconsin	Camp Randall Stadium; Madison, WI (rivalry)	L 7–34	39,788	
November 24	at Notre Dame*	Notre Dame Stadium; Notre Dame, IN	T 20–20	40,685	
*Non-conference game; ^{†}Homecoming; Rankings from AP Poll released prior to the game

== Game summaries ==
=== Kansas State ===
On September 29, 1951, the Hawkeyes held Kansas State to 68 yards of total offense (including negative 21 rushing yards). At the time, it was the school's single-team record. It still ranks third in Iowa history.

=== Michigan ===
Michigan at Iowa

Team	1	2	3	4	Total
• Michigan	7	7	7	0	21
Iowa	0	0	0	0	0

- Date: October 20
- Location: Iowa Stadium, Iowa City, IA
- Game attendance: 53,050

On October 20, Iowa lost to Michigan, 21–0, before a crowd of 53,050, which was at the time an all-time attendance record at Iowa Stadium in Iowa City, Iowa. Don Peterson scored two touchdowns, and Bill Putich scored one. Russ Rescoria converted all three kicks for extra point. Iowa out-gained Michigan by 310 yards (251 rushing, 59 passing) to 219 yards (145 rushing, 74 passing).

=== Ohio State ===
On October 27, Iowa lost to Ohio State, 47–21, before a crowd of 67,551 at Ohio Stadium. Tony Curcillo threw four touchdown passes and ran for two more to give Woody Hayes his first conference victory. Curcillo completed 10 of 14 passes for 292 yards. Vic Janowicz played only on special teams in the Iowa game due to a bruised rib sustained the prior week against Indiana. The Buckeyes gained 399 yards (308 passing, 91 rushing) to 342 yards (172 rushing, 170 passing) for Iowa.
