= 1951 Purdue Boilermakers football team =

American college football season

1951 Purdue Boilermakers football
- Conference: Big Ten Conference

Ranking
- Coaches: No. 14
- Record: 5–4 (4–1 Big Ten)
- Head coach: Stu Holcomb (5th season)
- MVP: Pete Brewster
- Captains: Clint Knitz; Leo Sugar
- Home stadium: Ross–Ade Stadium

1951 Big Ten Conference football standings
	Conf.					Overall
Team	W		L		T	W		L		T
No. 4 Illinois $	5	–	0	–	1	9	–	0	–	1
Purdue	4	–	1	–	0	5	–	4	–	0
No. 8 Wisconsin	5	–	1	–	1	7	–	1	–	1
Michigan	4	–	2	–	0	4	–	5	–	0
Ohio State	2	–	2	–	2	4	–	3	–	2
Northwestern	2	–	4	–	0	5	–	4	–	0
Minnesota	1	–	4	–	1	2	–	6	–	1
Indiana	1	–	5	–	0	2	–	7	–	0
Iowa	0	–	5	–	1	2	–	5	–	2
$ – Conference champion; Rankings from AP Poll

The 1951 Purdue Boilermakers football team was an American football team that represented Purdue University during the 1951 Big Ten Conference football season. In their fifth season under head coach Stu Holcomb, the Boilermakers compiled a 5–4 record, finished in second place in the Big Ten Conference with a 4–1 record against conference opponents, and outscored opponents by a total of 153 to 152.

Notable players on the 1951 Purdue team included quarterback Dale Samuels and end Leo Sugar.

== Schedule ==
Date	Opponent	Site	Result	Attendance	Source
September 29	No. 11 Texas*	Ross–Ade Stadium; West Lafayette, IN	L 0–14	31,000	
October 6	Iowa	Ross–Ade Stadium; West Lafayette, IN	W 34–30	25,000	
October 12	at Miami (FL)*	Burdine Stadium; Miami, FL	L 0–7	51,818	
October 20	Wisconsin^{†}	Ross–Ade Stadium; West Lafayette, IN	L 7–31	40,000	
October 27	at No. 15 Notre Dame*	Notre Dame Stadium; Notre Dame, IN (rivalry)	L 9–30	57,890	
November 3	Penn State*	Ross–Ade Stadium; West Lafayette, IN	W 28–0	21,000	
November 10	at Northwestern	Dyche Stadium; Evanston, IL	W 35–14	38,000	
November 17	Minnesota	Ross–Ade Stadium; West Lafayette, IN	W 19–13	29,000	
November 24	at Indiana	Memorial Stadium; Bloomington, IN (Old Oaken Bucket)	W 21–13	31,000	
*Non-conference game; ^{†}Homecoming; Rankings from AP Poll released prior to the game

== Roster ==
- Tom Bettis, G
- Pete Brewster, E
- Robert Bringer, E
- Rex Brock, HB
- Bill Bruner, T
- Phil Ehrman, HB
- Roy Evans, QB
- John Durham, HB
- Bernie Flowers, E
- Allen Hager, G
- Earl Heninger, HB
- Jack Houston, G
- Curt Jones, HB
- Don Kasperan, FB
- John Kerr, E
- Philip Klezek, HB
- Clinton Knitz, C
- Fred Locke, E
- John Lynch, C
- Phil Mateja, QB
- Norman Montgomery, FB
- Herman Murray, T
- William Oyler, HB
- Ray Pacer, T
- Ken Panfil, T
- Fred Preziosio, T-G
- Tom Redinger, HB-E
- James Reichert, FB-K
- Tom Roggeman, G
- Dale Samuels, QB
- Max Schmaling, FB-HB
- Joe Skibinski, G
- Leo Sugar, E
- Jerry Thorpe, HB-FB
- Walt Viellieu, T
- Dale Whiteaker, T-E
- Jim Whitmer, HB
- Jim Wojciehowski, E
- Joe Wojtys, T
- Glenn Young, FB
- Ed Zembal, HB

== Game summaries ==
=== Minnesota ===
- Phil Klezek 13 rushes, 143 yards
