= 1951 Indiana Hoosiers football team =

American college football season

1951 Indiana Hoosiers football
- Conference: Big Ten Conference
- Record: 2–7 (2–4 Big Ten)
- Head coach: Clyde B. Smith (4th season)
- MVP: Gene Gedman
- Home stadium: Memorial Stadium

1951 Big Ten Conference football standings
	Conf.					Overall
Team	W		L		T	W		L		T
No. 4 Illinois $	5	–	0	–	1	9	–	0	–	1
Purdue	4	–	1	–	0	5	–	4	–	0
No. 8 Wisconsin	5	–	1	–	1	7	–	1	–	1
Michigan	4	–	2	–	0	4	–	5	–	0
Ohio State	2	–	2	–	2	4	–	3	–	2
Northwestern	2	–	4	–	0	5	–	4	–	0
Minnesota	1	–	4	–	1	2	–	6	–	1
Indiana	1	–	5	–	0	2	–	7	–	0
Iowa	0	–	5	–	1	2	–	5	–	2
$ – Conference champion; Rankings from AP Poll

The 1951 Indiana Hoosiers football team represented the Indiana Hoosiers in the 1951 Big Ten Conference football season. They participated as members of the Big Ten Conference. The Hoosiers played their home games at Memorial Stadium in Bloomington, Indiana. The team was coached by Clyde B. Smith, in his fourth and final year as head coach of the Hoosiers. At the end of the season, Smith was fired and replaced by Bernie Crimmins. The team was ranked at No. 55 in the 1951 Litkenhous Ratings.

== Schedule ==
Date	Opponent	Site	Result	Attendance	Source
September 29	at No. 14 Notre Dame*	Notre Dame Stadium; Notre Dame, IN	L 6–48	55,790	
October 6	Pittsburgh*	Memorial Stadium; Bloomington, IN	W 13–6	28,000	
October 13	at Michigan	Michigan Stadium; Ann Arbor, MI	L 14–33	60,100	
October 20	at No. 17 Ohio State	Ohio Stadium; Columbus, OH	W 32–10	74,265	
October 27	No. 4 Illinois	Memorial Stadium; Bloomington, IN (rivalry)	L 0–21	33,000	
November 3	at No. 10 Wisconsin	Camp Randall Stadium; Madison, WI	L 0–6	51,118	
November 10	at Minnesota	Memorial Stadium; Minneapolis, MN	L 14–16	45,986	
November 17	No. 1 Michigan State*	Memorial Stadium; Bloomington, IN (rivalry)	L 26–30	16,000	
November 24	Purdue	Memorial Stadium; Bloomington, IN (Old Oaken Bucket)	L 13–21	31,000	
*Non-conference game; Rankings from AP Poll released prior to the game

== 1952 NFL draftees ==
Player	Position	Round	Pick	NFL club
Mel Becket	Center	8	87	Green Bay Packers
John Davis	Back	15	171	Chicago Cardinals
Sam Talarico	Tackle	19	225	Cleveland Browns
Bobby Robertson	Back	23	276	Cleveland Browns
Cliff Anderson	End	25	291	Chicago Cardinals
