= Don Peterson (American football) =

American football player (1928–2010)

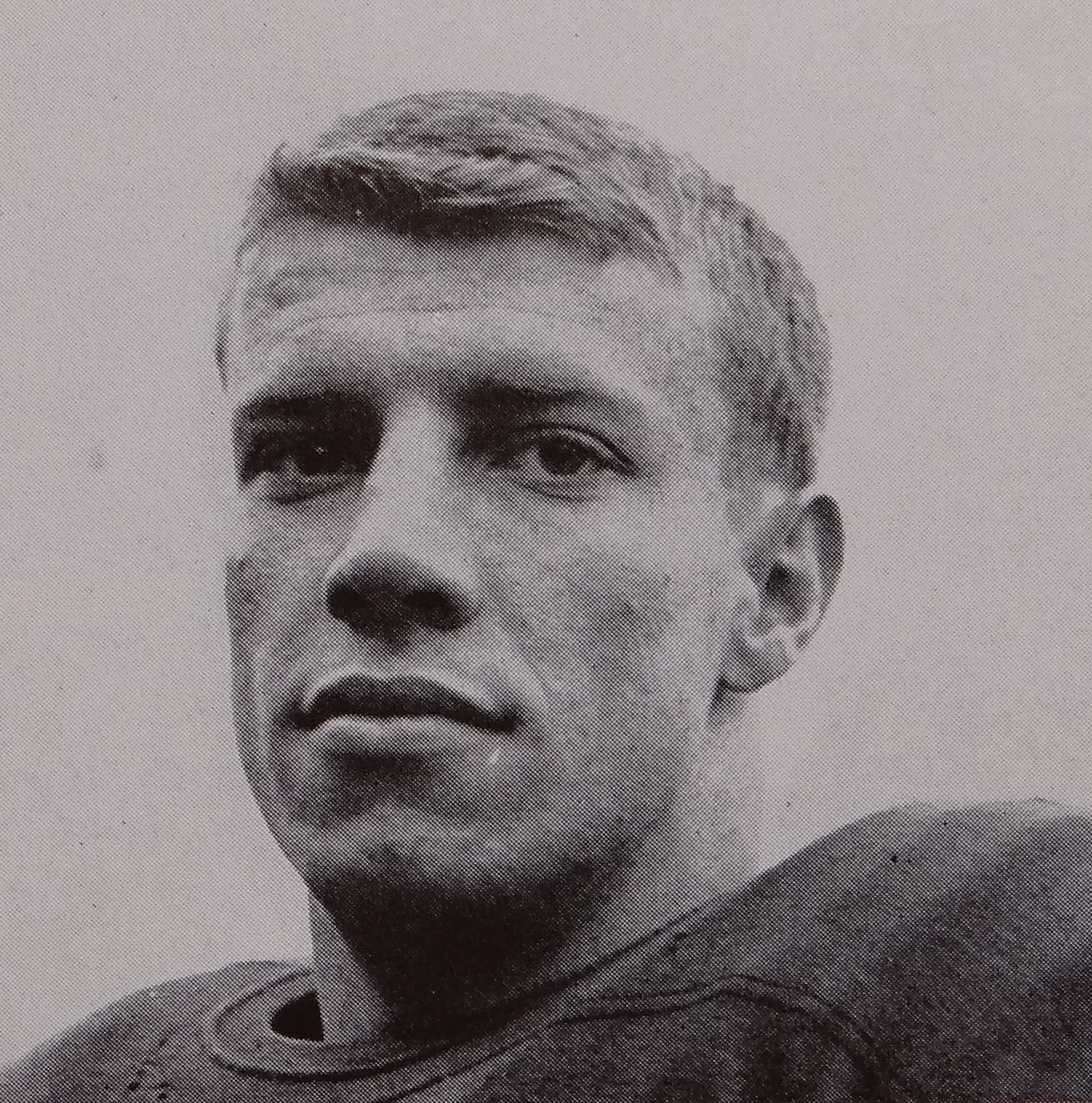
- Peterson from the 1952 Michiganensian

Profile
- Positions: Fullback, Halfback

Personal information
- Born: April 26, 1928; St. Louis, Missouri, U.S.
- Died: July 20, 2010 (aged 82)
- Listed height: 5 ft 10 in (1.78 m)
- Listed weight: 175 lb (79 kg)

Career information
- High school: St. Catherine's High School (Racine, Wisconsin)
- College: Michigan (1948–1951)

Awards and highlights
- Most Valuable Player, 1951 Michigan Wolverines football team

Donald Williams "Jiggs" Peterson (April 26, 1928 – July 20, 2010) was an American college football player He played football for the University of Michigan from 1948 to 1951 and was selected as the Most Valuable Player of the 1951 Michigan Wolverines football team

== Biography ==
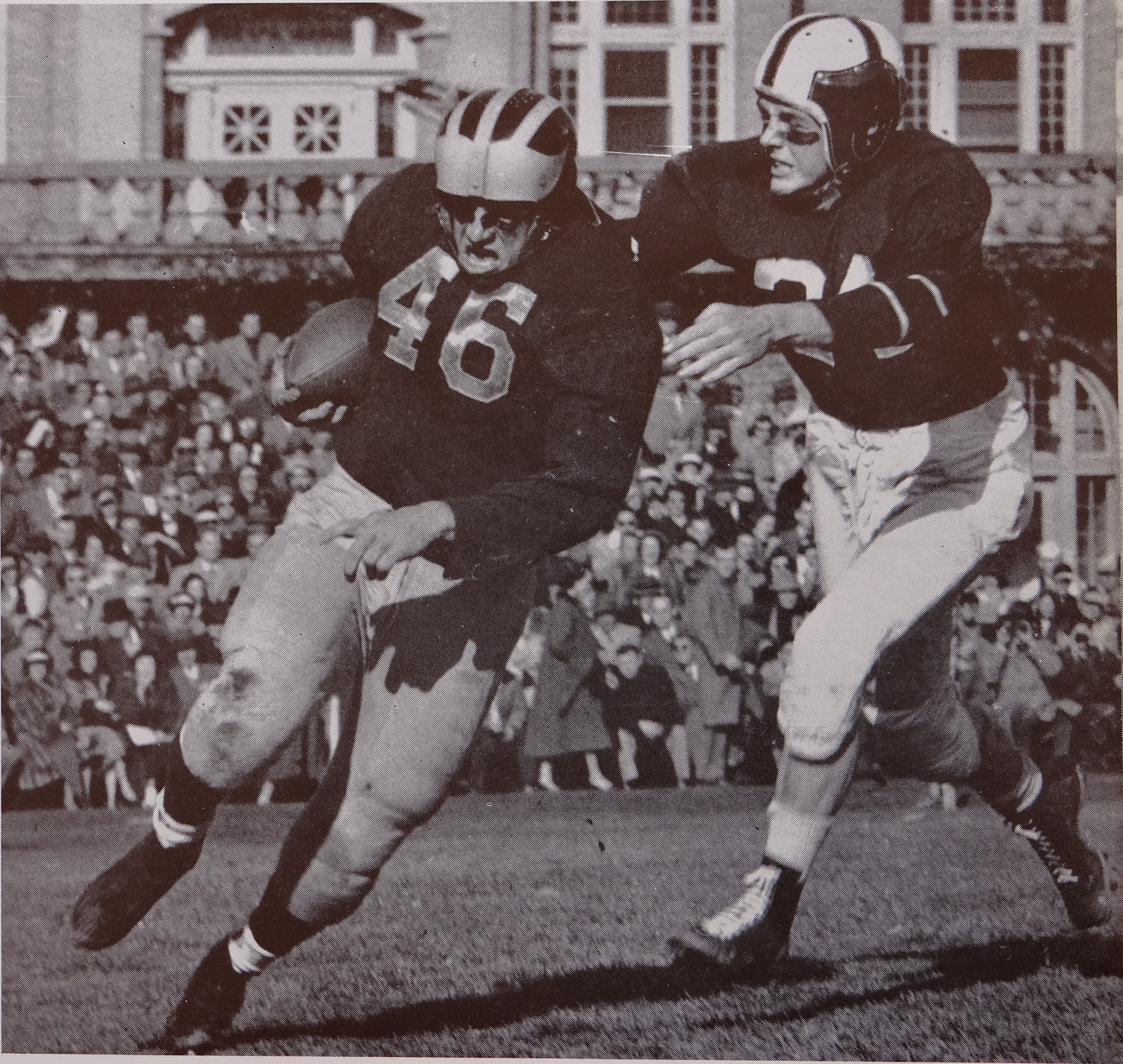
Peterson, 1951

Born in 1928 in St. Louis, Peterson was the son of Lyda and Russell Peterson. In his youth, his family moved to Racine, Wisconsin. He attended St. Catherine's High School and played football for the Angels' undefeated championship football team in 1945. After graduating, Don enlisted in the U. S. Army and served in Japan, where he organized sports activities for U. S. troops after World War II. After returning, he accepted a scholarship to play football for the University of Michigan, and played football for the Michigan Wolverines football team from 1948 to 1951. He played in the 1951 Rose Bowl game and finished the 1951 season as the fourth leading ground gamer in the Big Ten Conference. During the 1951 season, he scored two touchdowns against Iowa and rushed for a career-high 104 yards against Illinois. In his final game for Michigan, Peterson rushed for 70 yards and scored the only touchdown in a 7–0 win over Ohio State. At the end of the 1951 season, he was selected as the Most Valuable Player on the 1951 Michigan Wolverines football team and selected to play in the 1951 Blue/Grey All-Star Classic . After graduating with honors with a major in zoology, he went on to graduate from the University of Michigan, School of Dentistry. His older brother, Tom Peterson, played fullback for Michigan between 1944 and 1949. Don was selected by the Green Bay Packers in the 17th round (196th overall pick) of the 1952 NFL draft.

Peterson practiced dentistry in Ann Arbor, Michigan for more than three decades. He died on July 20, 2010.
