= Ken Jackson (gridiron football) =

American football player (1929–1998)

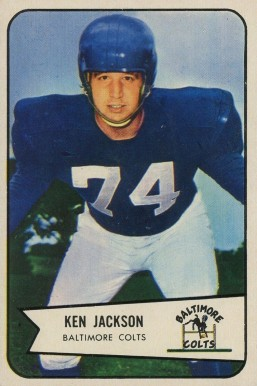
- Jackson on a 1954 Bowman football card

No. 74, 69
- Positions: Offensive guard, offensive tackle

Personal information
- Born: April 26, 1929; Thorndale, Texas, U.S.
- Died: January 28, 1998 (aged 68); Houston, Texas, U.S.
- Listed height: 6 ft 2 in (1.88 m)
- Listed weight: 236 lb (107 kg)

Career information
- High school: Stephen F. Austin (Austin, Texas)
- College: Texas (1947–1950)
- NFL draft: 1951: 2nd round, 22nd overall pick

Career history
- Dallas Texans (1952); Baltimore Colts (1953–1957); Montreal Alouettes (1958)

Awards and highlights
- First-team All-SWC (1950); 1949 Orange Bowl champion; 1951 All-Service Team

Career NFL statistics
- Games played: 71
- Games started: 43
- Fumble recoveries: 4
- Stats at Pro Football Reference

Career CFL statistics
- Games played: 8
- Military career
- Allegiance: United States
- Branch: United States Navy
- Service years: 1951–1952
- Rank: Seaman

Kenneth Gene "the Tall Texan" Jackson (April 26, 1929 – January 28, 1998) was an American professional football offensive lineman in the National Football League (NFL) and Canadian Football League (CFL). A native of Austin, Texas, Jackson played college football at The University of Texas and then pro football for seven seasons for the Dallas Texans, the Baltimore Colts and the Montreal Alouettes.

== Biography ==
Ken Jackson was born in Thorndale, Texas, and went to high school at Austin High School in Austin, Texas, from which he graduated in 1947.

He then went to the University of Texas where he played he played on the varsity team as a freshman. In 1949, he helped the team go to the Orange Bowl where they upset #8 Georgia. In 1950 he helped them win the Southwest Conference Championship and go to the 1951 Cotton Bowl Classic where they lost to Tennessee on a late game touchdown. Jackson finished his college career with an appearance in the 1951 Senior Bowl.

Jackson then joined the Navy during the Korean War. He was stationed in San Diego and played football for the Navy, making the All-Service Team.

== Pro Career ==
After his discharge, he was drafted by the New York Yankees, which then became the Dallas Texans, in the second round of the NFL draft (22nd overall). He played one season with the team as the Texans, playing in 12 games and starting 10 of them. The team moved to Baltimore and he went with them, playing 59 games with the team over the next 6 years.

He played one season with the Montreal Alouettes of the CFL in 1958, helping them to the playoffs. In the IRFU Semi-Final game he suffered a compound fracture in his left arm and then retired from football.

== Later Life ==
In 1959, he moved back to Austin and became owner and partner in Ken Jackson's Drive In for several years and then got into the pawn shop business, opening pawn shops all over Texas. He retired in Waco in 1981 and died at Methodist Hospital in Houston on January 28, 1988.

Hall of Famer Art Donovan was Jackson's teammate on the Colts and shared this anecdote: "Jackson had this fight with Big Daddy [Lipscomb] up in training camp. Actually it wasn't really a fight. Big Daddy took a sucker shot at Jackson and decked him. By the time Jackson scrambled back up into the fray, there were people already breaking it up, so Jackson never really got any licks in. But he turned to Big Daddy and said, 'I'm gonna get you, you dirty bastard. You're dead meat.' No one doubted that he meant it.

"Every year the Colts would play an intrasquad exhibition game for the benefit of various Baltimore charities—the Boys' Club and whatnot—and sixty-two thousand fans would fill Memorial Stadium. So the 1957 game was perhaps three weeks after the fight, and nothing had happened between Big Daddy and Jackson. Then, right in the middle of the game, Jackson did it. He butted Big Daddy—broke his face mask, shattered his nose, and knocked a couple of teeth out. They dragged Big Daddy off the field unconscious. And when he woke up on the bench, he began mumbling, 'I'm gonna kill that Texas bastard. I'm gonna go back in there and kill him.'

"Jackson heard about it, went over to Big Daddy on the sideline, and told him, 'I hope you come back in for more. Cause I ain't through with you yet. I'm gonna murder you.' And he had this gleam in his eyes that really shook Big Daddy. Hell, it shook me, too. We went up to Big Daddy and told him, 'Gene, stay away from that guy. He will kill you.' And from that day on, Big Daddy avoided the Tall Texan like the plague. Jackson was a crazy bastard."
