= 1951 Northwestern Wildcats football team =

American college football season

1951 Northwestern Wildcats football
- Conference: Big Ten Conference
- Record: 5–4 (2–4 Big Ten)
- Head coach: Bob Voigts (5th season)
- MVP: John Steeb
- Captain: Don MacRae
- Home stadium: Dyche Stadium

1951 Big Ten Conference football standings
	Conf.					Overall
Team	W		L		T	W		L		T
No. 4 Illinois $	5	–	0	–	1	9	–	0	–	1
Purdue	4	–	1	–	0	5	–	4	–	0
No. 8 Wisconsin	5	–	1	–	1	7	–	1	–	1
Michigan	4	–	2	–	0	4	–	5	–	0
Ohio State	2	–	2	–	2	4	–	3	–	2
Northwestern	2	–	4	–	0	5	–	4	–	0
Minnesota	1	–	4	–	1	2	–	6	–	1
Indiana	1	–	5	–	0	2	–	7	–	0
Iowa	0	–	5	–	1	2	–	5	–	2
$ – Conference champion; Rankings from AP Poll

The 1951 Northwestern Wildcats team represented Northwestern University during the 1951 Big Ten Conference football season. In their fifth year under head coach Bob Voigts, the Wildcats compiled a 5–4 record (2–4 in Big Ten, sixth), and were outscored 124 to 112.

Against Navy on October 20, Charlie Hren rushed for 218 yards to set a school record. It stood for 18 years, until Mike Adamle shattered it with 316 yards against Wisconsin in 1969.

== Schedule ==
Date	Opponent	Rank	Site	Result	Attendance	Source
September 29	Colorado*		Dyche Stadium; Evanston, IL	W 35–14	42,000	
October 6	Army*		Dyche Stadium; Evanston, IL	W 20–14	40,000	
October 13	at Minnesota		Memorial Stadium; Minneapolis, MN	W 21–7	51,915	
October 20	Navy*	No. 18	Dyche Stadium; Evanston, IL	W 16–7	40,000	
October 27	No. 14 Wisconsin	No. 13	Dyche Stadium; Evanston, IL	L 0–41	50,000	
November 3	at Ohio State		Ohio Stadium; Columbus, OH	L 0–3	71,089	
November 10	Purdue		Dyche Stadium; Evanston, IL	L 14–35	38,000	
November 17	at Michigan		Michigan Stadium; Ann Arbor, MI (rivalry)	W 6–0	57,634	
November 24	Illinois		Dyche Stadium; Evanston, IL (rivalry)	L 0–3	52,000	
*Non-conference game; Rankings from AP Poll released prior to the game
