= Dick Hightower =

American football player (1930–2007)

No. 51
- Position: Center

Personal information
- Born: August 3, 1930
- Died: December 5, 2007 (age 77); Ozona, Texas, U.S.

Career information
- High school: Tyler High School
- College: Southern Methodist University

Career history
- 1949–1951: SMU Mustangs

Awards and highlights
- Consensus All-American (1951); 2× First-team All-SWC (1950, 1951)

Richard Guy Hightower (August 3, 1930 – December 5, 2007) was an American football player. He played college football at the center position for the SMU Mustangs from 1949 to 1951. He was a consensus first-team selection on the 1951 College Football All-America Team. He also received All-Southwest Conference honors in both 1950 and 1951.

Hightower was selected by the Washington Redskins in the fourth round (43rd overall pick) of the 1952 NFL draft, but he did not appear in any regular season games in the National Football League (NFL). He was inducted into the Southern Methodist University Hall of Fame in 1982.

Hightower died in 2007 at Ozona, Texas, while on a hunting trip with friends.
