= 1950 All-Southwest Conference football team =

American college football all-star team

The 1950 All-Southwest Conference football team consists of American football players chosen by various organizations for All-Southwest Conference teams for the 1950 college football season. The selectors for the 1950 season included the Associated Press (AP) and the United Press (UP). Players selected as first-team players by both the AP and UP are designated in bold.

== All Southwest selections ==
=== Backs ===
- **Larry Isbell**, Baylor (AP-1, UP-1 [quarterback])
- **Byron Townsend**, Texas (AP-1, UP-1 [fullback])
- **Bob Smith**, Texas A&M (AP-1, UP-1 [fullback])
- **Kyle Rote**, SMU (AP-1, UP-1 [halfback])
- Gil Bartosh, Texas Christian (AP-2)
- Ben Tompkins, Texas (AP-2)
- Billy Tidwell, Texas A&M (AP-2)
- Fred Benners, SMU (AP-2)

=== Ends ===
- **Harold Riley**, Baylor (AP-1, UP-1)
- Andy Hillhouse, Texas A&M (AP-2, UP-1)
- Ben Procter, Texas (AP-1)
- Billy Howton, Rice (AP-2)

=== Tackles ===
- **Ken Jackson**, Texas (AP-1, UP-1)
- **Paul Giroski**, Rice (AP-1, UP-1)
- Bobby Collier, SMU (AP-2)
- Clarence "Red" Marable, Texas Christian (AP-2)

=== Guards ===
- **Bud McFadin**, Texas (AP-1, UP-1)
- **Dave Hanner**, Arkansas (AP-1, UP-1)
- Herschel Forester, SMU (AP-2)
- Max Greiner, Texas A&M (AP-2)

=== Centers ===
- **Dick Hightower**, SMU (AP-1, UP-1)
- Leo Stonestreet, Rice (AP-2)

== Key ==
AP = Associated Press, "selected for the Associated Press by the seven coaches"

UP = United Press

Bold = Consensus first-team selection of both the AP and UP

== See also ==
- 1950 College Football All-America Team
