= Pat O'Donahue =

American football player (1930–2017)

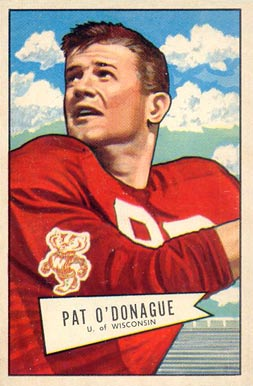
- O'Donahue on a 1952 Bowman football card

No. 83, 81
- Position: Defensive end

Personal information
- Born: October 7, 1930; Eau Claire, Wisconsin, U.S.
- Died: July 18, 2017 (aged 86) near Madison, Wisconsin, U.S.
- Listed height: 6 ft 1 in (1.85 m)
- Listed weight: 215 lb (98 kg)

Career information
- High school: Regis (Eau Claire)
- College: Wisconsin (1948–1951)
- NFL draft: 1952: 5th round, 57th overall pick

Career history
- San Francisco 49ers (1952); Green Bay Packers (1955)

Awards and highlights
- First-team All-American (1951); First-team All-Big Ten (1951)

Career NFL statistics
- Games played: 20
- Games started: 12
- Touchdowns: 1
- Stats at Pro Football Reference

James Patrick Michael O'Donahue (October 7, 1930 – July 18, 2017) was an American professional football defensive end in the National Football League (NFL). He played for the San Francisco 49ers in 1952 and the Green Bay Packers in 1955. He played at the collegiate level with the University of Wisconsin.

== Biography ==
O'Donahue was born James Patrick Michael O'Donahue on October 7, 1930, in Eau Claire, Wisconsin. He died in a nursing home near Madison, Wisconsin on July 18, 2017.
