= Fred Benners =

American football player (1930–2023)

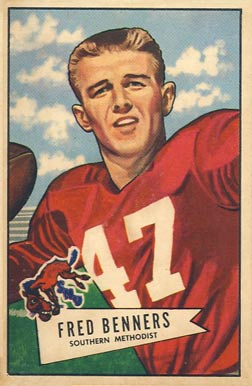
- Benners on a 1952 Bowman football card

No. 47
- Position: Quarterback

Personal information
- Born: June 22, 1930; Dallas, Texas, U.S.
- Died: January 6, 2023 (aged 92); Dallas, Texas, U.S.
- Listed height: 6 ft 3 in (1.91 m)
- Listed weight: 195 lb (88 kg)

Career information
- High school: Highland Park (TX)
- College: Sewanee (1947); SMU (1948-1951)
- NFL draft: 1951: 8th round, 97th overall pick

Career history
- New York Giants (1952)

Awards and highlights
- Second-team All-SWC (1950)

Career NFL statistics
- Passing yards: 320
- TD–INT: 0-5
- Passer rating: 25.1
- Stats at Pro Football Reference

Frederick Hagaman Benners (June 22, 1930 – January 6, 2023) was an American professional football player. He played the 1952 NFL season for the New York Giants. Benners also played at Southern Methodist University and is considered one of the greatest Mustang players of all time.

A native of Dallas, Texas, Benners attended Highland Park High School in the Dallas suburb of University Park. In 1947 he took the Scots to the Texas state final, which his team lost 22-13 to Brackenridge High School of San Antonio. Benners then attended Sewanee, and later Southern Methodist in Dallas, where he was part in one of the greatest upsets in college football history. On October 13, 1951, SMU beat University of Notre Dame 27-20 in a rare nationally televised game, powered by Benners' historic performance, as he hit on 22 passes in 44 attempts for 326 yards and four touchdowns. “No one could have been more adroit in picking the spot for a super-duper performance,” wrote The New York Times.

Already picked in the 1951 NFL draft by the New York Giants at 97th overall, Benners played his rookie season in 1952. He then, however, left the NFL, pursuing a career as lawyer in Dallas.
