= Lowell Perry =

American football player (1931–2001)

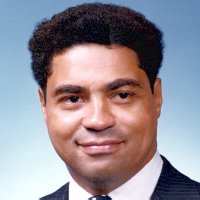
- Perry as EEOC Chairman, c. 1975

Chair of the Equal Employment Opportunity Commission
- In office May 27, 1975 – May 15, 1976
- President: Gerald Ford
- Preceded by: Ethel Bent Walsh
- Succeeded by: Ethel Bent Walsh

Personal details
- Born: December 5, 1931 Ypsilanti, Michigan, U.S.
- Died: January 7, 2001 (aged 69) Southfield, Michigan, U.S.
- Education: University of Michigan (BA); Detroit College of Law (JD)

Military service
- Branch/service: United States Air Force
- Years of service: 1954–1956
- Rank: First lieutenant
- Football career

No. 41
- Positions: End, safety

Personal information
- Listed height: 6 ft 1 in (1.85 m)
- Listed weight: 190 lb (86 kg)

Career information
- High school: Ypsilanti (Ypsilanti, Michigan)
- College: Michigan
- NFL draft: 1953: 8th round, 90th overall pick

Career history

Playing
- Pittsburgh Steelers (1956)

Coaching
- Pittsburgh Steelers (1957) Ends coach

Awards and highlights
- First-team All-American (1952); Third-team All-American (1951); First-team All-Big Ten (1951); NFL records: First African-American assistant coach in NFL history

Career NFL statistics
- Receptions: 14
- Receiving yards: 334
- Touchdowns: 2
- Stats at Pro Football Reference

Lowell Wesley Perry (December 5, 1931 – January 7, 2001) was an American professional football player and coach, government official, businessman, and broadcaster. He was the first African-American assistant coach in the National Football League (NFL), the first African American to broadcast an NFL game to a national audience, and Chrysler's first African-American plant manager. He was appointed as chairman of the federal Equal Employment Opportunity Commission (EEOC) by President Gerald Ford, holding that position from 1975 to 1976. He later served as the director of the Michigan Department of Labor from 1990 to 1996.

== Early life ==
Perry was born in Ypsilanti, Michigan. His father, Lawrence C. Perry, was a dentist who graduated from the University of Michigan in 1920. Perry was the youngest of four children. He grew up in Ypsilanti, where his father maintained a dental practice and was a respected civic leader. As a youth, Perry joined the Boy Scouts of America organization as well as the National Honor Society. He attended Ypsilanti High School where he was a standout multi-sport athlete. Perry lettered in football, basketball, baseball, and track during his high school career. At age 16, he helped lead the Ypsilanti High School football team to the Class B state championship.

== University of Michigan ==
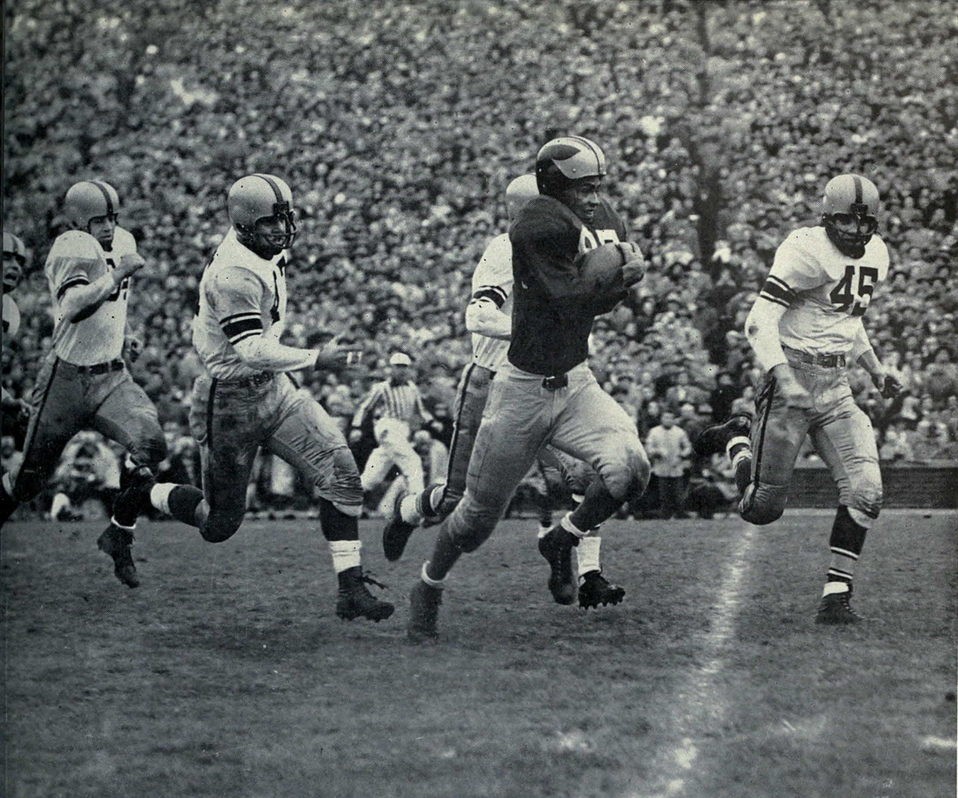
Perry (No. 85) eludes opposing players, 1951

Perry graduated from the University of Michigan where he studied history and played football for the Michigan Wolverines football team from 1950 to 1952. Perry was a two-way player who played end on offense and safety on defense and also handled punt returns for the Wolverines. After the 1951 season, he was selected as a second-team All-American by the Central Press Association and a third-team All-American by the United Press. He was considered as the best defensive back in college football during the 1951 season, and was also selected by the Associated Press as a first-team All-Big Ten Player and by the United Press as a first-team player on its All-Midwest team.

In three seasons for Michigan, Perry had 71 receptions for 1,261 yards and nine touchdowns. Perry's three-year career total of 1,261 receiving yards was not exceeded by another Michigan player for a decade until Jack Clancy totaled 1,917 yards in four years from 1963 to 1966.

Perry's highest single-game total came against Indiana in 1951, with five catches for 165 yards. He had two additional touchdown catches against Indiana in 1952. His 165-yard game against Indiana was the Michigan single-game receiving record for 15 years, until Clancy had 197 yards against Oregon State in 1966.

Perry also returned 42 punts at Michigan for 351 yards, an average of 10.9 yards per return.

== Pittsburgh Steelers and military service ==
Perry was drafted by the Pittsburgh Steelers in the eighth round (91st overall pick) of the 1953 NFL draft. His professional football career was deferred due to Reserve Officers' Training Corps (ROTC) obligations. Perry joined the United States Air Force, where he achieved the rank of second lieutenant. While serving in the Air Force, Perry played on the Bolling Air Force Team that included Al Dorow, Tommy O'Connell, and Johnny Lattner. Perry was named the outstanding football player in the military.

In 1956, Perry joined the Pittsburgh Steelers as an end. On his first play for the Steelers, Perry ran 93 yards for a touchdown in a pre-season game against the Detroit Lions. In his first six NFL games, Perry totaled 14 catches for 334 yards and two touchdowns, including a 75-yard touchdown catch against the Cleveland Browns. Perry also returned 11 punts for 127 yards and nine kickoffs for 219 yards.

In his sixth regular season game, Perry sustained a fractured pelvis and dislocated hip that forced his retirement. Football writer Mark A. Latterman later wrote about witnessing Perry's career-ending injury:

A skinny 15 year-old boy and his dad were cheering the Pittsburgh Steelers new rookie star, Lowell Perry as he roared whippet-like around the New York Giants' fabled 1956 defensive line and headed full-throttle for the open field. The boy's cheers turned to tears when Giants' star, Roosevelt Grier crunched Perry from behind and linebacker Bill Svoboda hit him from the side simultaneously, filling the stadium with a sickening 'crack' which silenced the Steelers' faithful. I will never forget my sadness as the stretcher carried my new hero from the field. Perry's pelvis was fractured, his hip dislocated and he never played pro football again.

Perry was hospitalized at Pittsburgh's Mercy Hospital for 13 weeks after the injury. In June 1957, the Steelers hired Perry as the team's ends coach, making him the NFL's first African American coach since Fritz Pollard in the 1920s. He worked as a scout for the Steelers in 1958. While working for the Steelers, Perry went to the Duquesne University law school.

== Government, broadcast, and business career ==
Perry received a Juris Doctor degree from Detroit College of Law in 1960. That same year, he became a law clerk to U.S. District Court Judge Frank A. Picard (the Michigan Wolverines' quarterback from 1909 to 1910). In 1961, he accepted a job with the Chevrolet Division of General Motors in the personnel department of the gear and axle division. In 1962, he left Chevrolet to prosecute unfair labor practice charges for the National Labor Relations Board, a position he held until 1963.

In 1963, Perry began a 17-year career with Chrysler. He started as a personnel specialist.

In April 1966, Perry was hired as a color analyst for CBS Television to broadcast Steelers games alongside play-by-play man Joe Tucker. He was the first African-American to broadcast an NFL game to a national audience.

After his stint as a television broadcaster, Perry returned to Chrysler where he became a personnel manager in 1970. In 1973, he was appointed the plant manager of Chrysler's Eldon Avenue Axle Plant in Detroit. He was the first African American to hold the plant manager position at a U.S. automobile company.

In 1975, Perry was appointed by President Gerald Ford to be chairman of the U.S. Equal Employment Opportunity Commission. At the ceremony in which Perry was sworn in, President Ford spoke and made the following comments:

He first came to my attention when I saw his prowess on the gridiron at the University of Michigan. He made it and I didn't. He was really good and played not only exceptionally well at Ann Arbor but very well for the Pittsburgh Steelers. I have known Lowell over a period of time since then. I have always looked at his career, both in Government and with private employment, as an example of what a person can do who has got ability and the desire and the dedication. I think it's, in this instance, Government's gain to have Lowell with us, and Lynn Townsend probably is losing one of his very finest young people in his Chrysler organization.

He served as EEOC commissioner until 1976. Perry resigned from the EEOC after one year and returned to Chrysler.

In 1980 he served on the board of NFL Charities, precursor to the NFL Foundation

Perry returned to government service in 1990 as director of the Michigan Department of Labor, a position he held for six years. In March 1996, Governor John Engler appointed him as the director of the Office of Urban Programs, a position that he held until his retirement in April 1999.

== Family and death ==
Perry was married in January 1954 and had a daughter and two sons, one of whom is former New York Knicks basketball executive and former University of Michigan coach Scott Perry.

Perry died of cancer at a hospital in Southfield, Michigan, in January 2001.

== See also ==
- University of Michigan Athletic Hall of Honor
