= Wayne Robinson =

American gridiron football player (1930–2015)

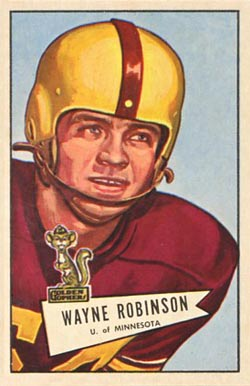
- Robinson on a 1952 Bowman football card

No. 52
- Positions: Linebacker, center

Personal information
- Born: January 14, 1930; Minneapolis, Minnesota, U.S.
- Died: December 20, 2015 (aged 85); San Diego, California, U.S.
- Listed height: 6 ft 2 in (1.88 m)
- Listed weight: 225 lb (102 kg)

Career information
- High school: North (Minneapolis)
- College: Minnesota (1948–1951)
- NFL draft: 1952: 8th round, 89th overall pick

Career history

Playing
- Philadelphia Eagles (1952–1956)

Coaching
- Winnipeg Blue Bombers (1957-1958) Assistant coach; BC Lions (1959–1961) Head coach; Iowa (1952–1956) Assistant coach; Houston Oilers (1966–1967) Assistant coach; Green Bay Packers (1968–1970) Assistant coach; Atlanta Falcons (1975–1976) Assistant coach

Awards and highlights
- 2× Pro Bowl (1954, 1955); First-team All-Big Ten (1951)

Career NFL statistics
- Games played: 58
- Games started: 57
- Fumble recoveries: 6
- Interceptions: 5
- Stats at Pro Football Reference

Wayne Lavern Robinson (January 14, 1930 – December 20, 2015) was an American professional football player who was a linebacker for the Philadelphia Eagles of the National Football League (NFL) from 1952 through 1956. He played college football for the Minnesota Golden Gophers and was selected by the Eagles in the eighth round of the 1952 NFL draft. He was selected to the Pro Bowl in 1954 and 1955.

After his playing career, he coached in the Canadian Football League for the Winnipeg Blue Bombers and the British Columbia Lions. He also coached at the University of Iowa, for the Houston Oilers, Green Bay Packers and the Atlanta Falcons before finally retiring in 1976.

He was named to the Philadelphia Eagles Top 75 players in franchise history in 2007 celebrating the team's 75th anniversary. He ranked at number 44. He died on December 20, 2015, in San Diego at the age of 85.
