= Leo Sugar =

American football player (1929–2020)

No. 84
- Position: Defensive end

Personal information
- Born: April 6, 1929; Flint, Michigan, U.S.
- Died: September 23, 2020 (aged 91); Fort Myers, Florida, U.S.
- Listed height: 6 ft 1 in (1.85 m)
- Listed weight: 214 lb (97 kg)

Career information
- High school: Flint Northern
- College: Purdue (1948–1949, 1951)
- NFL draft: 1952: 11th round, 123rd overall pick

Career history
- Chicago / St. Louis Cardinals (1954–1960); Philadelphia Eagles (1961); Detroit Lions (1962)

Awards and highlights
- 2× Pro Bowl (1958, 1960); Second-team All-American (1951); First-team All-Big Ten (1951); Second-team All-Big Ten (1950)

Career NFL statistics
- Fumble recoveries: 13
- Interceptions: 1
- Sacks: 9
- Stats at Pro Football Reference

Leo Tateusz Sugar (April 6, 1929 – September 23, 2020) was an American professional football player who was a defensive end in the National Football League (NFL) for the Chicago/St. Louis Cardinals, Philadelphia Eagles, and the Detroit Lions. He went to two Pro Bowls during his nine-year career. Sugar played college football at Purdue University, where he was an All-Big Ten Defensive End and was named to the College All-Star Game. He was named to the 1951 All-American team and was drafted in the eleventh round of the 1952 NFL draft. He was born in Flint, Michigan and played football and basketball for the Flint Northern Vikings in high school as well as a local American Legion baseball team. He died in September 2020 at the age of 91.
