= Chuck Boerio =

American football player (1930–2011)

No. 65
- Position: Linebacker

Personal information
- Born: May 9, 1930; Kincaid, Illinois, U.S.
- Died: September 30, 2011 (aged 81); Boulder, Colorado, U.S.
- Listed height: 6 ft 0 in (1.83 m)
- Listed weight: 205 lb (93 kg)

Career information
- College: Illinois
- NFL draft: 1952: 20th round, 231st overall pick

Career history
- Green Bay Packers (1952)

Awards and highlights
- First-team All-American (1951); First-team All-Big Ten (1951)
- Stats at Pro Football Reference

Charles M. Boerio (March 9, 1930 – September 30, 2011) was an American football player who played the linebacker position. He played at the college football at the University of Illinois at Urbana-Champaign where he was named All-American and All-Big Ten Conference in 1951. He was selected by the Green Bay Packers in the twentieth round of the 1952 NFL draft and was a member of the team that season.

Boerio later served two years in the United States Air Force where he played football for the Bowling Air Force Base at Washington D.C. In the late 1950s, he became a football coach, including as an assistant for the Colorado Buffaloes and the Cincinnati Bearcats.
