= Bill Putich =

American football player

Profile
- Position: Quarterback

Career information
- College: Michigan

Bill Putich was an American football player who played quarterback and halfback for the University of Michigan Wolverines football teams from 1949 to 1951.

== Playing career ==
A native of Cleveland, Ohio, Putich played only 13 minutes of a possible 540 as a sophomore in 1949. He earned the nickname 'One-Play-Putich' in Michigan's 7–3 win over Michigan State in 1949; Putich appeared for only one play in the game, throwing a touchdown pass to win the game.

Putich took over as the starting quarterback for the 1950 Michigan Wolverines football team. After a 14–7 loss to Michigan State in his first start, some questioned his selection as the starting quarterback. Sports writer John F. Mayhew wrote a column in defense of Putich, noting that he was inexperienced but showed promise. Mayhew noted:

Putich is an eager, hard-working, intelligent football player. He's good enough to have the complete faith of Backfield Coach George Ceithaml, one of Michigan's best quarterbacks and a man who should really know. Given a reasonable break, he'll prove it too.

Putich proved Mayhew correct in leading the 1950 team to a 9–3 win over Ohio State in the famed Snow Bowl game, a Big Ten Conference championship, and a 14–6 win over the University of California in the 1951 Rose Bowl. The 1950 team was ranked No. 9 in the final Associated Press poll and No. 6 in the coaches' poll.

In February 1951, Putich was ruled ineligible to compete for Michigan's basketball team due to academic deficiencies.

In the fall of 1951, with his eligibility restored, head coach Bennie Oosterbaan moved Putich from the quarterback position to the left halfback position. Putich was also the captain of the 1951 team. An October 1951 feature story "Three P's Put PUNCH in Michigan Attack," Putich was described as a "hard-driving and tricky runner."

Putich's career totals at Michigan included 668 yards passing with his longest pass completion of 55 yards against Minnesota in 1951. He also had 206 net yard rushing, 153 yards on pass receptions, and 212 yards on punt and kickoff returns.

== See also ==
- 1951 Michigan Wolverines football team
