= Hal Faverty =

American football player (1927–2008)

No. 51, 41
- Positions: Linebacker, defensive end, center

Personal information
- Born: September 26, 1927; Hammond, Indiana, U.S.
- Died: July 21, 2008 (aged 80)
- Listed height: 6 ft 2 in (1.88 m)
- Listed weight: 220 lb (100 kg)

Career information
- High school: Evanston (Evanston, Illinois)
- College: Wisconsin
- NFL draft: 1949: 15th round, 149th overall pick

Career history
- Green Bay Packers (1952); Toronto Argonauts (1953)

Awards and highlights
- First-team All-American (1951); Second-team All-Big Ten (1951)

Career NFL statistics
- Games played: 11
- Games started: 11
- Fumble recoveries: 3
- Stats at Pro Football Reference

Harold Edward Faverty (September 26, 1927 – July 21, 2008) was an American professional football player for the Green Bay Packers of the National Football League (NFL). He played college football for the Wisconsin Badgers.

== Biography ==
Faverty was born Harold Edward Faverty on September 26, 1927, in Hammond, Indiana.

== Career ==
Faverty was selected in the fifteenth round of the 1949 NFL draft by the Chicago Bears and would later play with the Green Bay Packers during the 1952 NFL season. He played at the collegiate level at the University of Wisconsin-Madison, where he was a member of the All-America team and is an inductee in the university's Athletics Hall of Fame.
