= Dick Logan (American football player) =

American football player (1930–2016)

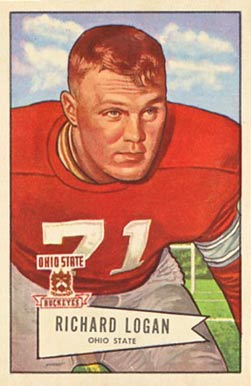

No. 67
- Positions: Guard, defensive tackle

Personal information
- Born: May 4, 1930; Mansfield, Ohio, U.S.
- Died: November 27, 2016 (aged 86); North Canton, Ohio, U.S.
- Listed height: 6 ft 2 in (1.88 m)
- Listed weight: 228 lb (103 kg)

Career information
- High school: Mansfield
- College: Ohio State
- NFL draft: 1952: 11th round, 132nd overall pick

Career history
- Green Bay Packers (1952–1953)

Awards and highlights
- First-team All-Big Ten (1951)

Career NFL statistics
- Games played: 19
- Games started: 8
- Fumble recoveries: 1
- Stats at Pro Football Reference

Richard Leroy Logan (May 4, 1930 – November 27, 2016) was an American professional football player. He played college football at Ohio State University and professionally in the National Football League (NFL) with the Green Bay Packers. Logan was drafted in the 11th round of the 1952 NFL draft by the Cleveland Browns.

== Biography ==
Logan was born in 1930 in Mansfield, Ohio.
