= Steve Ruzich =

American football player (1927–1991)

No. 61
- Positions: Guard, tackle, linebacker, defensive tackle

Personal information
- Born: December 24, 1927; Cleveland, Ohio, U.S.
- Died: November 30, 1991 (aged 63); Columbus, Ohio, U.S.
- Listed height: 6 ft 2 in (1.88 m)
- Listed weight: 228 lb (103 kg)

Career information
- High school: Groveport Madison (OH)
- College: Ohio State
- NFL draft: 1952: 14th round, 168th overall pick

Career history
- Green Bay Packers (1952–1954)

Career NFL statistics
- Games played: 36
- Games started: 20
- Fumble recoveries: 3
- Stats at Pro Football Reference

Stephen Ruzich (December 24, 1927 – November 30, 1991) was an American professional football player in the National Football League (NFL). Ruzich was born on December 24, 1927, in Cleveland, Ohio. He graduated from Groveport Madison High School before attending Ohio State University where he played as a guard for their football team. Prior to his time at Ohio State, Ruzich served in the United States Army during World War II.

Ruzich was drafted in the fourteenth round of the 1952 NFL draft by the Cleveland Browns. He later played 36 games over three seasons with the Green Bay Packers. He announced his retirement from professional football prior to the 1955 NFL season. He was ultimately released by the team in September 1955.
