= 1951 All-Big Ten Conference football team =

American college football all-star team

The 1951 All-Big Ten Conference football team consists of American football players selected to the All-Big Ten Conference teams selected by the Associated Press (AP), United Press (UP) and the International News Service (INS) for the 1951 Big Ten Conference football season.

== Offensive selections ==
=== Quarterbacks ===
- John Coatta, Wisconsin (AP-1; UP-1)

=== Halfbacks ===
- Johnny Karras, Illinois (AP-1; UP-1)
- Paul Giel, Minnesota (AP-1; UP-2)
- Vic Janowicz, Ohio State (UP-1)

=== Fullbacks ===
- Bill Reichardt, Iowa (AP-1; UP-1)

=== Ends ===
- Lowell Perry, Michigan (AP-1; UP-1)
- Rex Smith, Illinois (AP-1)
- Hal Faverty, Wisconsin (UP-2)
- Sonny Gandee, Ohio State (UP-2)

=== Tackles ===
- Tom Johnson, Michigan (AP-1; UP-1)
- Chuck Ulrich, Illinois (AP-1; UP-1)

=== Guards ===
- Don MacRae, Northwestern (AP-1; UP-1)
- Chuck Studley, Illinois (AP-1; UP-1)
- Joe Skibinski, Purdue (UP-2)

=== Centers ===
- Wayne Robinson, Minnesota (AP-1; UP-2)

== Defensive selections ==
=== Ends ===
- Pat O'Donahue, Wisconsin (AP-1)
- Leo Sugar, Purdue (AP-1; UP-1)

=== Tackles ===
- Dick Logan, Ohio State (AP-1; UP-2)
- Jerry Smith, Wisconsin (AP-1; UP-2)

=== Guards ===
- Robert Kennedy, Wisconsin (AP-1; UP-2)
- Deral Teteak, Wisconsin (AP-1)

=== Linebackers ===
- Chuck Boerio, Illinois (AP-1; UP-1)
- Roger Zatkoff, Michigan (AP-1; UP-3)

=== Backs ===
- Vic Janowicz, Ohio State (AP-1)
- Al Brosky, Illinois (AP-1)
- Fred Bruney, Ohio State (AP-1)

== Key ==
AP = Associated Press, chosen by conference coaches

UP = United Press

Bold = Consensus first-team selection of both the AP and UP

== See also ==
- 1951 College Football All-America Team
