= Fred Bruney =

American football player and coach (1931–2016)

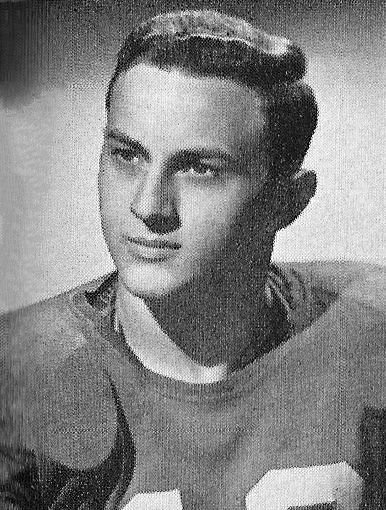

No. 45, 41, 22, 38, 47, 33
- Position: Defensive back

Personal information
- Born: December 30, 1931; Martins Ferry, Ohio, U.S.
- Died: January 22, 2016 (aged 84); Sandy Springs, Georgia, U.S.
- Listed height: 5 ft 10 in (1.78 m)
- Listed weight: 184 lb (83 kg)

Career information
- High school: Martins Ferry
- College: Ohio State
- NFL draft: 1953: 3rd round, 35th overall pick

Career history

Playing
- San Francisco 49ers (1953–1956); Pittsburgh Steelers (1956–1957); Los Angeles Rams (1958); Boston Patriots (1960–1962)

Coaching
- Boston Patriots (1960–1963) Defensive backs coach; Philadelphia Eagles (1964–1968) Defensive backs coach; Atlanta Falcons (1969–1974) Defensive backs coach; Atlanta Falcons (1975–1976) Defensive coordinator; Philadelphia Eagles (1977–1982) Defensive backs coach; Philadelphia Eagles (1983–1985) Assistant head coach/defensive backs coach; Philadelphia Eagles (1985) Interim head coach; Atlanta Falcons (1986) Defensive backs coach; Atlanta Falcons (1987–1989) Assistant head coach; Tampa Bay Buccaneers (1990) Defensive coordinator; New York Giants (1991–1992) Defensive backs coach; Indianapolis Colts (1993–1996) Defensive assistant

Awards and highlights
- 2× AFL All-Star (1961, 1962); 2× First-team All-Big Ten (1951, 1952)

Career NFL/AFL statistics
- Interceptions: 15
- Fumble recoveries: 4
- Total touchdowns: 1
- Stats at Pro Football Reference

Head coaching record
- Regular season: 1–0 (1.000)
- Coaching profile at Pro Football Reference

Frederick Karl Bruney (December 30, 1931 – January 22, 2016) was an American professional football coach and player.

== College career ==
Bruney played halfback on both the offensive and defensive sides of the ball for Ohio State from 1950 to 1952. He scored six touchdowns for the Buckeyes in the 1952 season, but he was known primarily for his defensive play. He had 17 career interceptions, which remains second in the Ohio State record book. Bruney was a first-team All-Big Ten selection in 1952.

== Professional career ==
Bruney was drafted in the third round of the 1953 NFL draft by the Cleveland Browns. On September 22, 1953, he was traded to the San Francisco 49ers to get to the regular season roster size limit. He ultimately played in the National Football League (NFL) for the San Francisco 49ers, the Pittsburgh Steelers, and the Los Angeles Rams. In 1960, he joined the Boston Patriots of the upstart American Football League. He played there for three seasons and was a two-time AFL All-Star selection.

== Coaching career ==
Bruney was appointed the interim head coach of the Philadelphia Eagles for the last game of the 1985 season after Marion Campbell was let go with one game remaining in the season. That game was a 37–35 win over the Minnesota Vikings. The Eagles' 37 points was the most they had scored in a game in over 4 years. Bruney was replaced by Buddy Ryan for the 1986 season. Bruney also served as an assistant coach throughout his long NFL career with the Philadelphia Eagles, Atlanta Falcons, Tampa Bay Buccaneers, New York Giants and Indianapolis Colts. He retired from the NFL after the 1997 season, and at the time of his retirement, he held the longest tenure as a player and coach in professional football. Bruney died in Sandy Springs, Georgia on January 22, 2016.

== Head coaching record ==
Team	Year	Regular season					Postseason			
Team	Year	Won	Lost	Ties	Win %	Finish	Won	Lost	Win %	Result
PHI	1985	1	0	0	1.000	(interim)	-	-	-	-
PHI Total		1	0	0	1.000		0	0	.000	
Total		1	0	0	1.000		0	0	.000	

== See also ==
- List of American Football League players
