= 1951 All-America college football team =

Official list of the best college football players of 1951

The 1951 All-America college football team is composed of college football players who were selected as All-Americans by various organizations and writers that chose All-America college football teams in 1951. The eight selectors recognized by the NCAA as "official" for the 1951 season are (1) the All-American Board (AAB), (2) the American Football Coaches Association (AFCA, (3) the Associated Press (AP), (4) the Football Writers Association of America (FWO/FWD), (5) the International News Service (INS), (6) the Newspaper Enterprise Association (NEA), (7) the Sporting News and (8) the United Press (UP).

== Consensus All-Americans ==
For the year 1951, the NCAA recognizes eight published All-American teams as "official" designations for purposes of its consensus determinations. The following chart identifies the NCAA-recognized consensus All-Americans and displays which first-team designations they received.

Name	Position	School	Number	Official	Other
Bill McColl	End	Stanford	8/8	AAB, AFCA, APO, FWO, INSO, NEAO, SN, UP	CP, CTO, WC
Don Coleman	Tackle	Michigan St.	8/8	AAB, AFCA, APO, FWO, INSO, NEAO, SN, UP	CP, CTO, WC
Dick Kazmaier	Halfback	Princeton	8/8	AAB, AFCA, APO, FWO, INSO, NEAO, SN, UP	CP, CTO, WC
Hank Lauricella	Halfback	Tennessee	8/8	AAB, AFCA, APO, FWO, INSO, NEAO, SN, UP	CP, CTO, WC
Jim Weatherall	Tackle	Oklahoma	8/8	AAB, AFCA, APD, FWD, INSD, NEAO, SN, UP	CP, WC
Bob Ward	Guard	Maryland	8/8	AAB, AFCA, APO, FWD, INSO, NEAO, SN, UP	CTO, WC
Les Richter	Guard	California	6/8	AAB, APD, FWD, INSO, SN, UP	CP, CTO, CTD, WC
Dick Hightower	Center	SMU	5/8	AAB, AFCA, INSO, SN, UP	CP, CTO, WC
Babe Parilli	Quarterback	Kentucky	5/8	AAB, INSD, NEAO, SN, UP	CP, CTO, WC
Johnny Karras	Halfback	Illinois	5/8	AFCA, AAB, FWO, SN, UP	CP, WC
Bob Carey	End	Michigan St.	5/8	AAB, APO, NEAO, SN, UP	CP, WC
Ray Beck (Note: Although he was named a first-team player by four of the eight official selectors, and also by the Central Press Association and Chicago Tribune, Ray Beck is not recognized by the NCAA as a consensus All-American.)	Guard	Georgia Tech	4/8	AFCA, APD, FWO, NEAD	COL, CP, CTD

== All-American selections for 1951 ==
=== Ends ===
- Bill McColl, Stanford (College Football Hall of Fame) (AAB; AFCA; APO-1; FWO-1; INSO-1; NEAO-1; SN; UP-1; CP-1; CTO-1; WC-1)
- Bob Carey, Michigan State (AAB; APO-1; NEAO-1; SN; UP-1; CP-1; WC-1)
- Pat O'Donahue, Wisconsin (APD-1; FWD-1; NEAD-1)
- Billy Howton, Rice (AFCA; APO-2; CP-3; CTO-1)
- Frank McPhee, Princeton (FWD-1 INSD-1; UP-2; CP-3)
- Dewey McConnell, Wyoming (APD-1; NEAD-1)
- Stan Williams, Baylor (FWO-1)
- Leo Sugar, Purdue (APD-2; CTD-1)
- Eddie Bell, Penn (APD-2; INSD-1)
- Doug Atkins, Tennessee (CTD-1)
- Tom McCann, Holy Cross (APO-2)
- Jim Mutscheller, Notre Dame (UP-2)
- Lowell Perry, Michigan (UP-3; CP-2)
- Ed Barker, Washington State (UP-3)
- Hal Faverty, Wisconsin (CP-2; INSO-1)

=== Tackles ===
- Don Coleman, Michigan State (College Football Hall of Fame) (AAB; AFCA; APO-1; FWO-1; INSO-1; NEAO-1; SN; UP-1; CP-1; CTO-1; WC-1)
- Jim Weatherall, Oklahoma (College Football Hall of Fame) (AAB; AFCA; APD-1; FWD-1; INSD-1; NEAO-1; SN; UP-1; CP-1; WC-1)
- Pug Pearman, Tennessee (APD-1; FWD-1; NEAD-1; UP-2; CP-3)
- Bob Toneff, Notre Dame (APO-1; UP-2; CP-2)
- Jack Little, Texas A&M (FWO-1)
- Chuck Ulrich, Illinois (INSO-1)
- Bill George, Wake Forest (CTO-1)
- Doug Conaway, Texas Christian (NEAD-1)
- Lamar Wheat, Georgia Tech (UP-3; INSD-1)
- Dick Modzelewski, Maryland (College Football Hall of Fame) (APD-2; CTD-1)
- Tom Johnson, Michigan (CTD-1)
- Ollie Spencer, Kansas (APO-2)
- Bob Werckle, Vanderbilt (APO-2)
- Hal Mitchell, UCLA (CP-2)
- John Feltch, Holy Cross (CP-3)
- Jerrell Price, Texas Tech (APD-2)

=== Guards ===
- Bob Ward, Maryland (College Football Hall of Fame) (AAB; AFCA; APO-1; FWD-1; INSO-1; NEAO-1; SN; UP-1; CTO-1; WC-1)
- Les Richter, California (College Football Hall of Fame) (AAB; APD-1; FWD-1; INSO-1; SN; UP-1; CP-1; CTO-1, CTD-1; WC-1)
- Ray Beck, Georgia Tech (College Football Hall of Fame) (AFCA; APD-1; FWO-1; NEAD-1; UP-3; CP-1; CTD-1)
- Joe Palumbo, Virginia (College Football Hall of Fame) (APD-1; NEAO-1)
- Ted Daffer, Tennessee (APD-2; INSD-1; NEAD-1; UP-2; CP-2)
- Marv Matuszak, Tulsa (APO-1)
- Nick Liotta, Villanova (FWO-1; CTD-1 (linebacker))
- Chet Millett, Holy Cross (FWD-1)
- George Mrkonic, Kansas (INSO-1)
- Jim Donarski, Arizona (APO-2)
- Norm Manoogian, Stanford (APO-2)
- John Michels, Tennessee (UP-3)
- Harley Sewell, Texas (College Football Hall of Fame) (CP-3)
- Gerald Audette, Columbia (CP-3)
- Bill Athey, Baylor (APD-2)

=== Centers ===
- Dick Hightower, Southern Methodist (SMU) (AAB; AFCA; APO-2; INSO-1; SN; UP-1; CP-1; CP-1; CTO-1; WC-1)
- Pat Cannamela, USC (APD-2; UP-2; FWD-1; INSD-1 (center); NEAD-1; CP-2 (guard))
- Doug Moseley, Kentucky (APO-1; FWO-1; UP-3; CP-3)
- Keith Flowers, Texas Christian (APD-1; CTD-1)
- Chuck Boerio, Illinois (UP-2 (center); NEAD-1)
- George Tarasovic, LSU (NEAO-1)
- Charlie Harris, California (CP-2)
- Donn Moomaw, UCLA (College Football Hall of Fame) (APD-2; UP-3)

=== Quarterbacks ===
- Babe Parilli, Kentucky (AAB; APO-2; UP-1; CP-1; INSD-1; SN; NEAO-1 (QB); CTO-1 (QB); WC-1)
- Larry Isbell, Baylor (APO-1; UP-3; FWO-1; CP-2; INSD-1)
- Gary Kerkorian, Stanford (UP-2; CP-3; INSD-1)
- Al Dorow, Michigan State (INSD-1)
- Bill Wade, Vanderbilt (APO-2)

=== Halfbacks ===
- Dick Kazmaier, Princeton (Heisman Trophy and College Football Hall of Fame) (AAB; AFCA; APO-1; FWO-1; INSO-1; NEAO-1 (HB); SN; UP-1; CP-1; CTO-1 (HB); WC-1)
- Hank Lauricella, Tennessee (College Football Hall of Fame) (AAB; AFCA; APO-1; FWO-1; INSO-1; NEAO-1 (HB); SN; UP-1; FWO-1; CP-1; CTO-1 (HB); WC-1)
- Johnny Karras, Illinois (AFCA; AAB; APO-2; FWO-1; SN; UP-1; CP-1; WC-1)
- Ed Modzelewski, Maryland (APO-2; UP-3; CP-2; INSO-1)
- Bobby Dillon, Texas (APD-1; FWD-1 (halfback); NEAD-1 (safety); CTD-1)
- Al Brosky, Illinois (APD-1; FWD-1 (safety))
- Harry Agganis, Boston U. (NEAD-1 (def. halfback))
- Jim Ellis, Michigan State (CTD-1)
- Avatus Stone, Syracuse (CTD-1)
- Johnny Bright, Drake (College and Canadian Football Hall of Fame) (UP-2; CP-3)
- Vic Janowicz, Ohio State (College Football Hall of Fame) (APD-2; UP-2; CP-2)
- Veryl Switzer, Kansas State (APD-2)
- Jim Dooley, Miami (APD-2)

=== Fullbacks ===
- Ollie Matson, San Francisco (College and Pro Football Hall of Fame) (APD-1; UP-2; FWD-1 (def. halfback); CP-2; INSO-1; NEAD-1 (def. halfback)
- Hugh McElhenny, Washington (Pro and College Football Hall of Fame) (APO-1; UP-3; CP-3; NEAO-1 (FB); CTO-1 (FB))
- Frank Gifford, USC (Pro and College Football Hall of Fame) (AFCA; UP-3; CP-3)

== Key ==
- **Bold** – Consensus All-American
- -1 – First-team selection
- -2 – Second-team selection
- -3 – Third-team selection

=== Official selectors ===
- AAB = All-America Board
- AFCA = American Football Coaches Association, published in Collier's Weekly
- APO/APD = Associated Press. The AP selected separate offensive and defensive teams. "The team was picked after the Dec. 1 games in consultation with 11 prominent sportswriters. They had the benefit of reports from hundreds of writers and broadcasters throughout the country."
- FWO/FWD = The Football Writers Association of America picked separate offensive and defensive teams: "22-man offensive and defensive all-star teams picked by Grantland Rice and the Football Writers Association of America for Look magazine
- INSO/INSD = International News Service, later merged with UP to form UPI. The INS began selecting separate offensive and defensive teams in 1948 and continued that tradition in 1951.
- NEAO/NEAD = Newspaper Enterprise Association. The NEA selected separate offensive and defensive teams.
- SN = Sporting News
- UP = United Press. The United Press did not select separate offensive and defensive teams. They selected only 11 first-team players: "Chosen by ballots from 260 sports writers and broadcasters in all sections of the nation, these players were considered the finest at their positions."

=== Other selectors ===
- CP = Central Press Association: "the 21st annual Central Press All-American football team, selected as usual with the assistance of the nation's football captains"
- CTO/CTD = Chicago Tribune's 5th annual All-Players All-America team determined based on polling of players in cooperation with the major universities and colleges throughout the United States. The results were based on a record 18,876 votes (10,086 for offense and 8,790 for defense).
- WC = Walter Camp Football Foundation

== See also ==
- 1951 All-Big Seven Conference football team
- 1951 All-Big Ten Conference football team
- 1951 All-Pacific Coast Conference football team
- 1951 All-SEC football team
- 1951 All-Skyline Conference football team
