= Bertagnolli =

Bertagnolli is a surname. Notable people with the name include:

- Giacomo Bertagnolli (born 1999), Italian alpine skier
- Júlio Sérgio Bertagnolli (born 1978), Brazilian football manager and player
- Leonardo Bertagnolli (born 1978), Italian road bicycle racer
- Libero Bertagnolli (1914–1992), American football player and coach
- Monica Bertagnolli (born 1959), American surgical oncologist

== See also ==
- Massimo Bertagnoli (born 1999), Italian footballer
