= 1951 Notre Dame Fighting Irish football team =

American college football season

1951 Notre Dame Fighting Irish football
- Conference: Independent

Ranking
- Coaches: No. 13
- Record: 7–2–1
- Head coach: Frank Leahy (9th season)
- Captain: Jim Mutscheller
- Home stadium: Notre Dame Stadium

1951 Midwestern college football independents records
	Conf.			Overall
Team	W	L	T	W		L		T
No. 2 Michigan State		–		9	–	0	–	0
Xavier		–		9	–	0	–	1
Wabash		–		7	–	0	–	1
No. 13 Notre Dame		–		7	–	2	–	1
Dayton		–		7	–	3	–	0
Michigan Tech		–		4	–	2	–	1
Toledo		–		6	–	4	–	0
Washington University		–		5	–	4	–	0
Wayne		–		5	–	4	–	0
Bowling Green		–		4	–	4	–	1
Marquette		–		4	–	6	–	1
Baldwin–Wallace		–		3	–	5	–	0
John Carroll		–		3	–	6	–	0
Rose Poly		–		2	–	5	–	0
Youngstown		–		2	–	6	–	1
Rankings from AP Poll

The 1951 Notre Dame Fighting Irish football team was an American football team that represented the University of Notre Dame as an independent during the 1951 college football season. In their ninth year under head coach Frank Leahy, the Irish compiled a 7–2–1 record, outscored opponents by a total of 241 to 122, and were ranked No. 13 in the final United Press (UP) poll. In games against ranked opponents, they lost to national champion Michigan State and defeated No. 20 USC. The Detroit game on October 6 was the first night game in the history of Notre Dame football.

Tackle Bob Toneff received first-team honors from the Associated Press (and second-team honors from the UP) on the 1951 All-America college football team. End and team captain Jim Mutscheller received second-team honors from the UP. Ralph Guglielmi and Johnny Lattner emerged as offensive stars.

The team played its home games at Notre Dame Stadium in Notre Dame, Indiana.

== Schedule ==
Date	Opponent	Rank	Site	Result	Attendance	Source
September 29	Indiana	No. 14	Notre Dame Stadium; Notre Dame, IN	W 48–6	55,790	
October 5	at Detroit	No. 5	Briggs Stadium; Detroit, MI	W 40–6	52,331	
October 13	SMU	No. 5	Notre Dame Stadium; Notre Dame, IN	L 20–27	58,240	
October 20	at Pittsburgh		Pitt Stadium; Pittsburgh, PA (rivalry)	W 33–0	60,127	
October 27	Purdue	No. 15	Notre Dame Stadium; Notre Dame, IN (rivalry)	W 30–9	57,890	
November 3	vs. Navy	No. 13	Municipal Stadium; Baltimore, MD (rivalry)	W 19–0	44,237	
November 10	at No. 5 Michigan State	No. 11	Macklin Stadium; East Lansing, MI (rivalry)	L 0–35	51,296	
November 17	at North Carolina		Kenan Memorial Stadium; Chapel Hill, NC (rivalry)	W 12–7	44,000–45,500	
November 24	Iowa		Notre Dame Stadium; Notre Dame, IN	T 20–20	40,685	
December 1	at No. 20 USC		Los Angeles Memorial Coliseum; Los Angeles, CA (rivalry)	W 19–12	55,783	
Rankings from AP Poll released prior to the game

== Personnel ==
=== Players ===
- Virgil Bardash, No. 79, tackle, junior, 6', 210 pounds, Gary, IN
- Bill Barrett, No. 37, halfback, senior, River Forest, IL
- Joseph R. Bush, No. 73, tackle, 6'3", 203 pounds, Oak Park, IL
- Walter K. Cabral, No. 88, end, freshman, Honolulu, HI
- Gene Carrabine, No. 20, freshman, Gary, IN
- David Flood, defensive halfback, junior, 5'10", 185 pounds, Pittsburgh, PA
- Fidel J. "Goose" Gander, senior, 6'1", 196 pounds Chicago
- Ralph Guglielmi, No. 3, quarterback, Columbus, OH
- Jim Hamby, No. 55, center, senior, Caruthersville, MO
- Joseph Heap, halfback, freshman, 5'11", 175 pounds, New Orleans, LA
- Albert Kohanowich, end, junior, 6'1", 189 pounds, Hempstead, Long Island, New York
- Arthur J. Hunter, center, sophomore, 6'3", 213 pounds, Akron, OH
- Johnny Lattner, No. 14, halfback, sophomore, Chicago
- Frank F. "Fred" Mangialardi, end, sophomore, 6'1", 195 pounds, Chicago
- Menil "Minnie" Mavraides, No. 71, placekicker, 6'1", 202 pounds, Lowell, MA
- John Mazur, No. 1, quarterback, senior, Plymouth, PA
- Jim Mutscheller, No. 85, end and captain, 6'1", 198 pounds, Beaver Falls, PA
- Robert M. O'Neil, end, junior, 6'1", 193 pounds, Bridgeville, PA
- Chet Ostrowski, No. 63, end and guard, 6'1", 197 pounds, Chicago
- Donald Francis Penza, end, sophomore, Kenosha, WI
- John Petitbon, No. 23, halfback, senior, 190 pounds
- Frederick C. Poehler, No. 76, sophomore, 6'4", 210 pounds, Jackson, MI
- Paul Reynolds, halfback, freshman, Springfield, IL
- Dan Shannon, No. 33, linebacker/fullback, freshman, 6'0", 190 pounds, Chicago
- Dick Szymanski, No. 52, linebacker, Toledo, OH
- Bob Toneff, No. 75, tackle, 6'1", 235 pounds, Barberton, OH
- Neil Worden, No. 48, fullback, sophomore, 5'11", 187 pounds, Milwaukee, WI

=== Coaching staff ===
- Head coach: Frank Leahy
- Athletic director: Edward W. Krause
- Assistant coaches: Bernie Crimmins (backfield), William Joseph Earley, John F. Druze (ends), Joseph Andrew McArdle (guards), Walter John Ziemba (centers), Robert James McBride (tackles)

== 1951 NFL draft ==
The following Notre Dame players were selected in the 1951 NFL draft.

Player	Position	Round	Pick	Franchise
Bob Toneff	Tackle	2	22	San Francisco 49ers
John Petitbon	Halfback	7	74	New York Yanks
Chet Ostrowski	Defensive End	10	115	Washington Redskins
Jim Mutscheller	Defensive End	12	134	New York Yanks
Dave Flood	Defensive Back	13	150	Pittsburgh Steelers
Paul Burns	Guard	16	191	New York Giants
Billy Barrett	Halfback	28	327	Green Bay Packers
