= Schaake =

Schaake is the family name of:

- Bill Schaake (1930–2017), American football coach
- Elmer Schaake (1911–1966), American athlete and coach
- Katrin Schaake (born 1931), German actress
- Marietje Schaake (born 1978), Dutch politician
