= Claire Dunn =

American football coach (1915–1996)

Biographical details
- Born: May 17, 1915; Genoa, Ohio, U.S.
- Died: April 1, 1996 (aged 80); Athens, Ohio, U.S.

Playing career
- 1934–1936: Ohio
- Position: Fullback

Coaching career (HC unless noted)
- 1939–1949: Waite HS (OH) (assistant)
- 1951: Toledo (assistant)
- 1951–1953: Toledo

Head coaching record
- Overall: 9–12

Accomplishments and honors

Championships
- High school football national championship (1932)

Claire C. Dunn (May 17, 1915 – April 1, 1996) was an American football coach. He served as the head football coach at the University of Toledo from 1951 to 1953, compiling a record of 9–12.

== Early life ==
Dunn was born on May 17, 1915 in Genoa, Ohio to George C. and Evelyn (Moore) Dunn. He was one of five brothers who were standout football players in Ohio. Dunn played three seasons at Genoa Area High School before transferring to Waite High School for his senior season. He played fullback and linebacker for the 1932 Waite team that defeated Miami Senior High School to win the national championship.

Dunn played three seasons of varsity football for Ohio University and was a member of the Bobcat teams that won back-to-back Buckeye Athletic Association championships in 1935 and 1936. He received his bachelor's degree from OU in 1937 and his master's degree from the same school a year later. On June 17, 1939, he married Adelaide M. Stright and they had four daughters.

== Coaching ==
From 1939 to 1949, Dunn was an assistant football coach at Waite High School, where he also taught history and coached swimming and track. On February 25, 1947, Dunn was driving his nephew and four other Lott Day School students to school when a semi-trailer truck hit a patch of ice, skidded, and collided with his vehicle. Dunn suffered multiple fractures, but all five children were killed.

In 1951, Dunn became a volunteer assistant at Toledo under Don Greenwood while continuing to teach at Waite. When Greenwood resigned following a brawl in a game against Bowling Green, Dunn succeeded him on an acting basis. Dunn's position as head coach was made permanent in January 1952. Toledo went 4–5 in 1952 and following a disappointing 3–6 1953 season that included an 81–0 loss to Miami of Ohio, president Asa S. Knowles asked Dunn to resign or be fired. Dunn chose to resign.

== Later life ==
After leaving Toledo, Dunn returned to Waite and taught history and sociology until his retirement in 1976. From 1972 until his death, Dunn owned and operated the Indian Mound Campground in Athens, Ohio. He died unexpectedly on April 1, 1996 at O'Bleness Memorial Hospital in Athens.

== Head coaching record ==
Year	Team	Overall	Conference	Standing	Bowl/playoffs
Toledo Rockets (Independent) (1951)
1951	Toledo	2–1 (Note: Don Greenwood served as head coach for the first seven games of the season, leading Toledo to a record of 4–3 before he resigned. The Rockets finished the season with an overall record of 6–4.)			
Toledo Rockets (Mid-American Conference) (1952–1953)
1952	Toledo	4–5	1–4	T–6th	
1953	Toledo	3–6	2–3	4th	
Toledo:		9–12	3–7		
Total:		9–12			
