= 1951 Bradley Braves football team =

American college football season

1951 Bradley Braves football
- Conference: Missouri Valley Conference
- Record: 4–5 (0–3 MVC)
- Head coach: Bus Mertes (1st season)
- Home stadium: Peoria Stadium

1951 Missouri Valley Conference football standings
	Conf.					Overall
Team	W		L		T	W		L		T
Tulsa $	4	–	0	–	0	9	–	2	–	0
Drake	3	–	1	–	0	7	–	2	–	0
Oklahoma A&M	3	–	2	–	0	3	–	7	–	0
Houston	2	–	2	–	0	6	–	5	–	0
Detroit	2	–	4	–	0	4	–	7	–	0
Wichita	2	–	4	–	0	2	–	7	–	0
Bradley	0	–	3	–	0	4	–	5	–	0
$ – Conference champion

The 1951 Bradley Braves football team was an American football team that represented Bradley University as a member of the Missouri Valley Conference (MVC) during the 1951 college football season. Led by first-year head coach Bus Mertes, the Braves compiled an overall record of 4–5 with a mark of 0–3 in conference play, placing last out of seven teams in the MVC.

Following the season, Bradley withdrew from Missouri Valley Conference in solidarity with Drake University, who left the conference in protest over the Johnny Bright incident, in which Johnny Bright, star halfback for the Drake Bulldogs, was assaulted by an Oklahoma A&M player during a game in October of that year. Bradley officials explained that the school's difficulty in scheduling games with conference members and the MVC's voiding of Bradley's championships in basketball and baseball following a point-fixing scandal also contributed to the decision to withdraw.

== Schedule ==
Date	Opponent	Site	Result	Attendance	Source
September 22	Tampa*	Peoria Stadium; Peoria, IL	W 32–6	8,000	
September 29	Drake	Peoria Stadium; Peoria, IL	L 14–20		
October 6	at Wichita	Veterans Field; Wichita, KS	L 6–15	9,300	
October 13	at Wayne*	University of Detroit Stadium; Detroit, MI	W 34–27	3,021	
October 20	New Mexico A&M*^{†}	Peoria Stadium; Peoria, IL	W 34–6	4,500	
October 27	at Brandeis*	Waltham, MA	W 47–0		
November 3	Detroit	Peoria Stadium; Peoria, IL	L 6–7	1,500	
November 10	at Toledo*	Glass Bowl; Toledo, OH	L 13–38	4,800	
November 17	Bowling Green*	Peoria Stadium; Peoria, IL	L 6–20		
*Non-conference game; ^{†}Homecoming
