= 1951 Michigan State Spartans football team =

American college football season

1951 Michigan State Spartans football

National champion (Billingsley, Helms, Poling)
- Conference: Independent

Ranking
- Coaches: No. 2
- AP: No. 2
- Record: 9–0
- Head coach: Biggie Munn (5th season)
- MVP: Don Coleman
- Captain: LeRoy R. Crane
- Home stadium: Macklin Stadium

1951 Midwestern college football independents records
	Conf.			Overall
Team	W	L	T	W		L		T
No. 2 Michigan State		–		9	–	0	–	0
Xavier		–		9	–	0	–	1
Wabash		–		7	–	0	–	1
No. 13 Notre Dame		–		7	–	2	–	1
Dayton		–		7	–	3	–	0
Michigan Tech		–		4	–	2	–	1
Toledo		–		6	–	4	–	0
Washington University		–		5	–	4	–	0
Wayne		–		5	–	4	–	0
Bowling Green		–		4	–	4	–	1
Marquette		–		4	–	6	–	1
Baldwin–Wallace		–		3	–	5	–	0
John Carroll		–		3	–	6	–	0
Rose Poly		–		2	–	5	–	0
Youngstown		–		2	–	6	–	1
Rankings from AP Poll

The 1951 Michigan State Spartans football team was an American football team that represented Michigan State College as an independent during the 1951 college football season. In their fifth season under head coach Biggie Munn, the Spartans compiled a perfect 9–0 record and outscored opponents by a total of 270 to 114. The Spartans played their home games at Macklin Stadium (now known as Spartan Stadium) in East Lansing, Michigan.

In the final AP and UPI coaches polls, both released on December 3, 1951, Michigan State was ranked No. 2 behind No. 1 Tennessee. Tennessee went on to lose to No. 3 Maryland in the 1952 Sugar Bowl. However, neither the AP nor UPI took post-bowl polls in this time period. In later rankings and analyses, Michigan State was recognized as the 1951 national champion by three NCAA-recognized selectors: Billingsley Report, Helms Athletic Foundation, and Poling System. Other selectors have designated Maryland as the national champion.

Two Michigan State players, end Bob Carey and tackle Don Coleman, were recognized as consensus first-team players on the 1951 College Football All-America Team. Two other Spartans were designated as first-team All-Americans by one or more selectors: Al Dorow (first-team defensive back selected by the International News Service) and Jim Ellis (first-team defensive back selected by the Chicago Tribune.

Program for the 1951 season opener.

== Schedule ==
Date	Opponent	Rank	Site	Result	Attendance	Source
September 22	Oregon State	No. 2	Macklin Stadium; East Lansing, MI	W 6–0	33,373	
September 29	at Michigan	No. 2	Michigan Stadium; Ann Arbor, MI (rivalry)	W 25–0	97,239	
October 6	at No. 7 Ohio State	No. 1	Ohio Stadium; Columbus, OH	W 24–20	82,640	
October 13	Marquette	No. 1	Macklin Stadium; East Lansing, MI	W 20–14	39,251	
October 20	at Penn State	No. 3	New Beaver Field; University Park, PA (rivalry)	W 32–21	30,684	
October 27	Pittsburgh^{†}	No. 2	Macklin Stadium; East Lansing, MI	W 53–26	42,163	
November 10	No. 11 Notre Dame	No. 5	Macklin Stadium; East Lansing, MI (rivalry)	W 35–0	51,296	
November 17	at Indiana	No. 1	Memorial Stadium; Bloomington, IN (rivalry)	W 30–26	16,000	
November 24	Colorado	No. 2	Macklin Stadium; East Lansing, MI	W 45–7	29,987	
^{†}Homecoming; Rankings from AP Poll released prior to the game
