= 1951 Kansas State Wildcats football team =

American college football season

1951 Kansas State Wildcats football
- Conference: Big Seven Conference
- Record: 0–9 (0–6 Big 7)
- Head coach: Bill Meek (1st season)
- Home stadium: Memorial Stadium

1951 Big Seven Conference football standings
	Conf.					Overall
Team	W		L		T	W		L		T
No. 10 Oklahoma $	6	–	0	–	0	8	–	2	–	0
Colorado	5	–	1	–	0	7	–	3	–	0
Kansas	4	–	2	–	0	8	–	2	–	0
Iowa State	2	–	4	–	0	4	–	4	–	1
Nebraska	2	–	4	–	0	2	–	8	–	0
Missouri	2	–	4	–	0	3	–	7	–	0
Kansas State	0	–	6	–	0	0	–	9	–	0
$ – Conference champion; Rankings from AP Poll

The 1951 Kansas State Wildcats football team represented Kansas State University in the 1951 college football season. The team's head football coach was Bill Meek, in his first season at the helm of the Wildcats. The Wildcats played their home games in Memorial Stadium. 1951 saw the team finish with a record of 0–9, and a 0–6 record in Big Seven Conference play. The Wildcats scored just 73 points while giving up 212. They finished in seventh place in the Big Seven Conference.

Kansas State's record was 1–7–1 at the end of the season, including a 6–6 tie with Nebraska and a 14–12 victory over Missouri. However, when head coach Bill Meek learned after the season that an ineligible player had participated, he immediately self-reported the violation to the NCAA and the school voluntarily forfeited the win and the tie.

== Schedule ==
Date	Opponent	Site	Result	Attendance
September 22	Cincinnati*	Memorial Stadium; Manhattan, KS	L 0–34	12,000
September 29	at Iowa*	Iowa Stadium; Iowa City, IA	L 0–16	29,700
October 6	Nebraska	Memorial Stadium; Manhattan, KS (rivalry)	F 6–6 (forfeit)	12,000
October 1	at Iowa State	Clyde Williams Field; Ames, IA (rivalry)	L 6–32	15,789
October 20	Colorado^{†}	Memorial Stadium; Manhattan, KS (rivalry)	L 7–20	14,523
October 27	at Kansas	Memorial Stadium; Lawrence, KS (rivalry)	L 14–33	20,000
November 3	No. 17 Oklahoma	Memorial Stadium; Manhattan, KS	L 0–33	11,248
November 10	at Tulsa*	Skelly Stadium; Tulsa, OK	L 26–42	13,226
November 17	at Missouri	Memorial Stadium; Columbia, MO	F 14–12 (forfeit)	13,545
*Non-conference game; ^{†}Homecoming; Rankings from AP Poll released prior to the game

== Game summaries ==
=== Iowa ===
Team	1	2	3	4	Total
Kansas State	0	0	0	0	0
• #9 Iowa	2	0	7	7	16

- Date: September 29
- Location: Iowa Stadium
  Iowa City, IA
- Game attendance: 29,700

Iowa had eight scoring opportunities in the game but only came away with 16 points because of fumbles and penalties. Kansas State came closest to score in the second quarter, reaching Iowa 19 yard line.
