= 1951 Illinois Wesleyan Titans football team =

American college football season

1951 Illinois Wesleyan Titans football

CCI champion
- Conference: College Conference of Illinois
- Record: 8–0 (5–0 CCI)
- Head coach: Libero Bertagnolli (1st season)
- Home stadium: Illinois Wesleyan Stadium

1951 College Conference of Illinois football standings
| | Conf. | | | | | Overall |
| Team | W | | L | | T | W | | L | | T |
|---|---|---|---|---|---|---|---|---|---|---|
| Illinois Wesleyan $ | 5 | – | 0 | – | 0 | 8 | – | 0 | – | 0 |
| Wheaton (IL) | 3 | – | 1 | – | 0 | 6 | – | 2 | – | 0 |
| Lake Forest | 3 | – | 2 | – | 0 | 3 | – | 4 | – | 1 |
| Millikin | 3 | – | 2 | – | 0 | 3 | – | 4 | – | 0 |
| Illinois College | 3 | – | 3 | – | 0 | 4 | – | 4 | – | 0 |
| Augustana (IL) | 2 | – | 3 | – | 0 | 3 | – | 4 | – | 1 |
| North Central (IL) | 2 | – | 3 | – | 0 | 3 | – | 5 | – | 0 |
| Elmhurst | 1 | – | 3 | – | 0 | 4 | – | 4 | – | 0 |
| Carthage | 0 | – | 5 | – | 0 | 0 | – | 9 | – | 0 |
$ – Conference champion

The 1951 Illinois Wesleyan Titans football team represented Illinois Wesleyan University as a member of the College Conference of Illinois (CCI) during the 1951 college football season. Led by first-year head coach Libero Bertagnolli, the Titans compiled a perfect overall record of 8–0 with a mark of 5–0 in conference, winning the CCI title. The team played home games at Illinois Wesleyan Stadium in Bloomington, Illinois.

== Schedule ==
| Date | Time | Opponent | Site | Result | Attendance | Source |
|---|---|---|---|---|---|---|
| September 22 | 8:00 p.m. | Ripon* | Illinois Wesleyan Stadium; Bloomington, IL | W 21–12 | 2,500 | |
| September 29 | 2:00 p.m. | at Augustana (IL) | Illinois Wesleyan Stadium; Rock Island, IL | W 13–12 | | |
| October 6 | 2:00 p.m. | at Illinois State Normal* | McCormick Field; Normal, IL | W 13–6 | | |
| October 13 | 8:00 p.m. | Elmhurst | Illinois Wesleyan Stadium; Bloomington, IL | W 14–13 | | |
| October 20 | 1:30 p.m. | at Millikin | J.M.U. Field; Decatur, IL | W 26–7 | 3,811 | |
| October 27 | 2:00 p.m. | Illinois College^{†} | Illinois Wesleyan Stadium; Bloomington, IL | W 27–20 | 4,600 | |
| November 3 | | at Lake Forest | Farwell Field; Lake Forest, IL | W 20–12 | | |
| November 17 | 1:30 p.m. | Washington University* | Illinois Wesleyan Stadium; Bloomington, IL | W 14–7 | | |
*Non-conference game; ^{†}Homecoming; All times are in Central time
