= 1951 Nebraska Cornhuskers football team =

American college football season

1951 Nebraska Cornhuskers football
- Conference: Big Seven Conference
- Record: 2–8 (2–4 Big 7)
- Head coach: Bill Glassford (3rd season)
- Offensive scheme: T formation, spread
- Home stadium: Memorial Stadium

1951 Big Seven Conference football standings
	Conf.					Overall
Team	W		L		T	W		L		T
No. 10 Oklahoma $	6	–	0	–	0	8	–	2	–	0
Colorado	5	–	1	–	0	7	–	3	–	0
Kansas	4	–	2	–	0	8	–	2	–	0
Iowa State	2	–	4	–	0	4	–	4	–	1
Nebraska	2	–	4	–	0	2	–	8	–	0
Missouri	2	–	4	–	0	3	–	7	–	0
Kansas State	0	–	6	–	0	0	–	9	–	0
$ – Conference champion; Rankings from AP Poll

The 1951 Nebraska Cornhuskers football team was the representative of the University of Nebraska and member of the Big Seven Conference in the 1951 college football season. The team was coached by Bill Glassford and played their home games at Memorial Stadium in Lincoln, Nebraska.

Nebraska was ranked at No. 93 in the 1951 Litkenhous Ratings.

== Before the season ==
Coach Glassford's third year at the helm commenced with hopeful expectations after the turnaround season of 1950 that produced Nebraska's first winning record in ten years. The Cornhuskers had finished out the previous season ranked #17 by the AP Poll, following a competitive 35–49 loss to the national champion Oklahoma Sooners, and it looked like the train was finally back on the tracks in Lincoln. Returning for 1951 was the entire coaching staff of the previous season, and the AP shined favorably on Nebraska by introducing the Cornhuskers at #12 to open the 1951 slate.

== Schedule ==
Date	Time	Opponent	Rank	Site	Result	Attendance	Source
September 29	2:00 pm	TCU*	No. 12	Memorial Stadium; Lincoln, NE	L 7–28	38,000	
October 6	2:00 pm	at Kansas State		Memorial Stadium; Manhattan, KS (rivalry)	W 6–6 (forfeit)	12,000	
October 13	2:00 pm	Penn State*		Memorial Stadium; Lincoln, NE	L 7–15	39,000	
October 20	1:30 pm	at Minnesota*		Memorial Stadium; Minneapolis, MN (rivalry)	L 20–39	54,625	
October 27	2:00 pm	at Missouri		Faurot Field; Columbia, MO (rivalry)	L 19–35		
November 3	2:00 pm	Kansas^{†}		Memorial Stadium; Lincoln, NE (rivalry)	L 7–27	34,000–34,500	
November 10	2:00 pm	at Iowa State		Clyde Williams Field; Ames, IA (rivalry)	W 34–27	15,519	
November 17	2:00 pm	Colorado		Memorial Stadium; Lincoln, NE (rivalry)	L 14–36	31,000	
November 24	2:00 pm	No. 12 Oklahoma		Memorial Stadium; Lincoln, NE (rivalry)	L 0–27	33,698	
November 30	7:00 pm	at Miami (FL)*		Burdine Stadium; Miami, FL (rivalry)	L 7–19	32,283	
*Non-conference game; ^{†}Homecoming; Rankings from AP Poll released prior to the game

== Roster ==
Official Roster
83 Bauer, George E (Fr.); 63 Bingham, Gerald G (So.); 72 Boll, Don T (Jr.); 20 Bordogna, John QB (So.); 65 Brasee, Carl G (Jr.); 41 Brown, Dan QB (Fr.); 11 Cederdahl, James QB (Fr.); 23 Cifra, George FB (Fr.); 79 Connor, Ted T (So.); 61 Curtis, Clayton G (Jr.); 69 Dale, Cliff G (So.); 19 Decker, Robert HB (So.); 89 Emanuel, Dennis E (So.); 44 Fredstrom, Paul E (Fr.); 80 Giles, William E (So.); 78 Goll, Dick E (Jr.); 75 Goth, Harvey T (So.); 71 Handshy, Wayne T (Jr.); 40 Hopp, Cliff FB (Jr.); 77 Husmann, Ed G (Jr.); 88 James, Ted E (So.); 68 Jones, James G (So.); 29 Kennedy, Max HB (So.); 27 Korinek, Dennis HB (Fr.); 32 Levendusky, James HB (Jr.); 73 Minnick, Jerry T (So.); 14 Moore, Kenneth HB (Fr.); 67 Morgan, Russell G (So.)	74 Mullen, Robert T (Sr.); 30 Norris, Don QB (So.); 33 Novak, Ray FB (So.); 55 Oberlin, Bob C (Fr.); 53 Oliver, Jim T (So.); 84 Paulson, Jerry E (So.); 82 Paynich, George E (Jr.); 64 Ponsiego, Joe G (Sr.); 76 Prochaska, George T (Jr.); 16 Radik, Emil HB (Fr.); 35 Rankin, Duane QB (Fr.); 70 Regier, Dick E (Sr.); 12 Reynolds, Bobby HB (Jr.); 87 Robertson, Harold E (So.); 50 Schabacker, William E (So.); 56 Schroeder, Ken C (Jr.); 52 Scott, Verl C (Jr.); 43 Sebold, John T (Fr.); 81 Simon, Frank E (Sr.); 17 Smith, Robert HB (Fr.); 15 Sommers, James HB (Jr.); 85 Tangdall, Jim E (So.); Thayer, Bill HB (Fr.); 54 Watson, Dick C (Fr.); 18 Westin, Dick HB (So.); 62 Winey, Leo G (Jr.); 86 Yeager, Jerry E (So.); 34 Yeisley, James HB (Fr.)

== Coaching staff ==
Name	Title	First year in this position	Years at Nebraska	Alma mater
Bill Glassford	Head coach	1949	1949–1955	Pittsburgh
L. F. "Pop" Klein	Assistant coach	1945	1945–1958	
Ray Prochaska	Ends coach	1950	1947–1948, 1950–1954	Nebraska
Ike Hanscomb	Freshman coach	1948	1948–1953	
Bob Davis	Backfield coach	1949	1949–1955	
Peter Janetos	Freshman coach	1949	1949–1952	
Marvin Franklin	Defensive coach	1950	1949–1951	Vanderbilt
Ralph Fife	Offensive Line coach	1950	1950–1952	
Neal Mehring	Defensive coach	1950	1950–1951	

Bob Tritsch – Student Manager 1948–1951, Senior Student Manager 1950–51

== Game summaries ==
=== TCU ===
Team	1	2	Total
• TCU			28
#12 Nebraska			7

- Date: September 29
- Location: Memorial Stadium • Lincoln, Nebraska
- Game attendance: 36,000

The 1951 Cornhuskers stumbled out of the gate, falling to Texas Christian in Lincoln in the first-ever meeting of these teams. The combination of a new and innovative TCU offensive formation with ill-timed Nebraska turnovers gave the Horned Frogs a relatively easy win. TCU went on the finish the season 6–4–0 and ranked #11 by the AP Poll.

=== Kansas State ===
Team	1	2	3	4	Total
Nebraska	6	0	0	0	6
Kansas State	0	0	6	0	6

- Date: October 6
- Location: Memorial Stadium, Manhattan, Kansas
- Game attendance: 12,000
- Game weather: Rain

A large contingent of Cornhusker fans traveled to Manhattan for the season's road-opening game, braving the wet weather and with hopes of another easy win over the beleaguered Kansas State team. The Wildcats succeeded in slowing the Nebraska attack following the first touchdown of the day, and managed to tie the game after the half and hold on the finish the game at an even 6–6. Nebraska returned to Lincoln without an outright win in the series for the first time in the last nine meetings, but the Wildcats were later penalized for using an ineligible player for the game and had to forfeit the resulting tie. The official final recorded score for the game was later revised, to a 1–0 Nebraska victory, moving the Cornhuskers to 29–4–2 against Kansas State to date.

=== Penn State ===
Team	1	2	Total
• Penn State			15
Nebraska			7

- Date: October 13
- Location: Memorial Stadium • Lincoln, Nebraska
- Game attendance: 39,000

After a lackluster opening to the season, Coach Glassford reorganized his personnel in preparation for the visit by Penn State. The Nittany Lions scored first, but the Cornhuskers made it a battle by firing right back to go up 7–6. Scoring was sparse on the day, but Nebraska was unable to answer a later touchdown by Penn State and fell to 1–3 in the series.

=== Minnesota ===
Team	1	2	Total
Nebraska			20
• Minnesota			39

- Date: October 20
- Location: Memorial Stadium • Minneapolis
- Game attendance: 54,625

Minnesota hosted the Cornhuskers in Minneapolis and successfully avenged their rare loss to Nebraska by taking advantage of a series of Cornhusker miscues just prior to the halftime break. Until the shift of momentum, it appeared that Nebraska might be able to make a fight out of the contest, but the Golden Gophers were once again triumphant, advancing their commanding lead in the series to 26–5–2.

Minnesota Game starters

Position	Player
Quarterback	Don Norris
Left Back	Robert Smith
Right back	John Bordogna
Fullback	Ray Novak
Right End	Bill Giles
Right Tackle	Dick Regier
Left Tackle	George Handshy
Right Guard	Joe Ponsiego
Center	Verl Scott
Left Guard	George Prochaska
Left End	Frank Simon

Position	Player
Left End	Dick Goll
Left Tackle	Jerry Minnick
Left Guard	Ed Husmann
Right Guard	Carl Brasee
Right Tackle	Don Boll
Right End	Ted Connor
Linebacker	Cliff Hopp
Linebacker	George Cifra
Cornerback	James Levendusky
Cornerback	James Yeisley
Safety	Robert Decker

=== Missouri ===
Team	1	2	Total
Nebraska			19
• Missouri			35

- Date: October 27
- Location: Faurot Field • Columbia, Missouri

For the second week in a row, second-quarter mistakes proved costly to the Cornhuskers, as a 7–7 tie was broken open with two quick Missouri touchdowns before the half. By falling to the Tigers, who had as yet not won a game themselves, the Cornhusker season now seemed to be spiraling out of control, bringing back visions of the painful 1940s. Nebraska's lead in the series slipped to 25–16–3, and Missouri took back the Victory Bell for the year.

Missouri Game starters

Position	Player
Quarterback	Don Norris
Left Back	Bobby Reynolds
Right back	John Bordogna
Fullback	Ray Novak
Right End	Dick Regier
Right Tackle	Harvey Goth
Left Tackle	George Prochaska
Right Guard	Cliff Dale
Center	Verl Scott
Left Guard	Joe Ponsiego
Left End	Frank Simon

Position	Player
Left End	Dick Goll
Left Tackle	Robert Mullen
Left Guard	Carl Brasee
Right Guard	Verl Scott
Right Tackle	Don Boll
Right End	Bill Schabacker
Linebacker	Cliff Hopp
Linebacker	Ken Schroeder
Cornerback	Robert Smith
Cornerback	James Yeisley
Safety	Robert Decker

=== Kansas ===
Team	1	2	Total
• Kansas			27
Nebraska			7

- Date: November 3
- Location: Memorial Stadium • Lincoln, Nebraska
- Game attendance: 34,500
- Game weather: Windy

Homecoming week brought the Kansas Jayhawks to Lincoln, but more Cornhusker turnovers spelled doom for hopes of the season's first outright victory. Five of Nebraska's six fumbles were lost to Kansas, making little work for the Jayhawks to pick up the win and disappoint the homecoming crowd. Nebraska remained ahead in the series 41–13–3, but remained winless on the field in all six games of the season so far

Kansas Game starters

Position	Player
Quarterback	Don Norris
Left Back	Bobby Reynolds
Right back	Jim Cederdahl
Fullback	Ray Novak
Right End	Dick Regier
Right Tackle	Wayne Hanshy
Left Tackle	George Prochaska
Right Guard	Joe Ponsiego
Center	Verl Scott
Left Guard	Clayton Curtis
Left End	Frank Simon

Position	Player
Left End	Bill Schabacker
Left Tackle	Jerry Minnick
Left Guard	Don Boll
Right Guard	Ed Husmann
Right Tackle	Carl Brasee
Right End	Dennis Emanuel
Linebacker	Cliff Hopp
Linebacker	Robert Mullen
Cornerback	Robert Smith
Cornerback	James Yeisley
Safety	Robert Decker

=== Iowa State ===
Team	1	2	Total
• Nebraska			34
Iowa State			27

- Date: November 10
- Location: Clyde Williams Field • Ames, Iowa
- Game attendance: 15,519

Coach Glassford again implemented changes, installing elements of the spread formation presented by the Texas Christian team in Nebraska's season-opening loss, and successfully managed to snatch the season's first victory against the Cyclones. The turnover battle was also won by the Cornhuskers on the field, as Iowa State gave up six interceptions and failed to take away either of Nebraska's two fumbles on the day. Thus an outright winning streak was kept alive as the Cornhuskers left Ames with six straight decisions over the Cyclones and improved to 36–8–1 in the series.

Iowa State Game starters

Position	Player
Quarterback	John Bordogna
Left Back	Bobby Reynolds
Right back	Robert Smith
Fullback	Ray Novak
Right End	Dick Regier
Right Tackle	Wayne Hanshy
Left Tackle	George Prochaska
Right Guard	Joe Ponsiego
Center	Ken Schroeder
Left Guard	Clayton Curtis
Left End	Frank Simon

Position	Player
Left End	Bill Schabacker
Left Tackle	Jerry Minnick
Left Guard	Don Boll
Right Guard	Ed Husmann
Right Tackle	Carl Brasee
Right End	Dennis Emanuel
Linebacker	Robert Mullen
Linebacker	James Yeisley
Cornerback	Robert Smith
Cornerback	Robert Decker
Safety	Bobby Reynolds

=== Colorado ===
Team	1	2	Total
• Colorado			36
Nebraska			14

- Date: November 17
- Location: Memorial Stadium • Lincoln, Nebraska
- Game attendance: 31,000
- Game weather: Cold

Nebraska again attacked using the new spread formation, but found less success than the previous week, and once again the Cornhuskers were set back by miscues in the 2nd quarter. With key injuries taking a toll, Nebraska reverted to the T formation against the Buffaloes but was unable to produce meaningful results and fell before the visiting Colorado squad for the second year in a row, slipping to 6–4 in the series to date.

Colorado Game starters

Position	Player
Quarterback	John Bordogna
Left Back	Bobby Reynolds
Right back	Jim Cederdahl
Fullback	Ray Novak
Right End	Dick Regier
Right Tackle	George Prochaska
Left Tackle	Harvey Goth
Right Guard	Joe Ponsiego
Center	Ken Schroeder
Left Guard	Jerry Paulsen
Left End	Frank Simon

Position	Player
Left End	Bill Schabacker
Left Tackle	Jerry Minnick
Left Guard	Don Boll
Right Guard	Ed Husmann
Right Tackle	Carl Brasee
Right End	Dennis Emanuel
Linebacker	Cliff Hopp
Linebacker	Robert Mullen
Cornerback	James Yeisley
Cornerback	Robert Decker
Safety	Bobby Reynolds

=== Oklahoma ===
Team	1	2	Total
• #12 Oklahoma			27
Nebraska			0

- Date: November 24
- Location: Memorial Stadium • Lincoln, Nebraska
- Game attendance: 33,698

Reigning league champion Oklahoma arrived in Lincoln ranked at #12 by the AP Poll, and set to the task of closing Nebraska's home field season with another Cornhusker loss. The Nebraska defense made a fight out of the event for much of the game before collapsing in the 4th quarter. No offensive look managed to get past the Sooners as the Cornhuskers were shut out for the first time of the season, giving up another decision to Oklahoma, yet still holding on to the series lead at 16–12–3. The nine straight losses against the Sooners again extended Nebraska's record losing streak to any single team. Oklahoma finished the season as undefeated Big 7 champions, 8–2–0 overall, and ranked #10.

== Game Starters ==
Defense Starters
S Robert Decker
	LB / LB; Robert Mullen / Cliff Hopp
CB Robert Smith	RE / RT / RG / LG / LT / LE; Dennis Emanuel / Carl Brasee / Ed Husmann / Don Boll / Jerry Minnick / Bill Schabacker	CB James Yeisley

Offensive starters

LE Frank Simon	LG / C / RG / LT / RT; Clayton Curtis / Ken Schroeder / Joe Ponsiego / George Prochaska / Wayne Handshy	RE Dick Regier

QB
Jim Cederdahl

LB	RB	FB
Bobby Reynolds	Georgie Cifra	Ray Novak

=== Miami ===
Team	1	2	Total
Nebraska			7
• Miami			19

- Date: November 30
- Location: Burdine Stadium • Miami
- Game attendance: 32,283

The Cornhuskers traveled to Miami for the first-ever meeting of these teams, and fan expectation was not high for success. Surprisingly, the Cornhuskers came out swinging and were actually leading the game 7–6 by halftime, avoiding the "2nd quarter jinx" that had haunted the squad for much of the season. The second half told a different story as Nebraska's scoring came to a halt and the Hurricanes tacked on two more touchdowns to close out a very disappointing Cornhusker campaign.

Miami Game starters

Position	Player
Quarterback	John Bordogna
Left Back	Bobby Reynolds
Right back	Robert Smith
Fullback	Ray Novak
Right End	Dick Regier
Right Tackle	Wayne Handshy
Left Tackle	George Prochaska
Right Guard	Joe Ponsiego
Center	Ken Schroede
Left Guard	Clayton Curtis
Left End	Frank Simon

Position	Player
Left End	Bill Schabacker
Left Tackle	Jerry Minnick
Left Guard	Don Boll
Right Guard	Ed Husmann
Right Tackle	Carl Brasee
Right End	Dennis Emanuel
Linebacker	Cliff Hopp
Linebacker	Robert Mullen
Cornerback	James Yeisley
Cornerback	Robert Smith
Safety	Robert Decker

== Rankings ==
Ranking movements Legend: ██ Increase in ranking ██ Decrease in ranking — = Not ranked
	Week											
Poll	Pre	1	2	3	4	5	6	7	8	9	10	Final
AP	12	—	—	—	—	—	—	—	—	—	—	—

== After the season ==
The brief successful fire seen in Nebraska's 1950 8–2 season was just as quickly darkened when the 1951 campaign fell flat. Although the season eventually would be recorded as a dismal 2–8–0 after being revised because of the Kansas State forfeit, this was of no meaningful improvement over the original 1–8–1 end-of-season tally, and was significantly worse than coach Glassford's initial 5–4 record in his first year. One bright spot looking to the future was the return of future NFL draft picks Bobby Reynolds and Ed Hussman, both set to play for one more year.

The disappointing close to 1951 brought coach Glassford's career record down to 9–9–0 (.500) in the Big 7, and dropped his previously winning overall record to 12–15–1 (.446). The Nebraska program endured another hit to its legacy by slipping to 328–163–32 (.658) all time and 129–46–11 (.723) in conference play.

== Future NFL and other professional league players ==
- Ed Husmann, 1953 9th-round pick of the Chicago Cardinals
- Jerry Minnick, 1954 9th-round pick of the Washington Redskins
- Bobby Reynolds, 1953 7th-round pick of the Los Angeles Rams
