= 1952 Salad Bowl =

| Dayton Flyers | Houston Cougars |
| (7–2) | (5–5) |
| 21 | 26 |
| Head coach: Joe Gavin | Head coach: Clyde Lee |
| | 1 | 2 | 3 | 4 | Total |
|---|---|---|---|---|---|
| Dayton | 7 | 14 | 0 | 0 | 21 |
| Houston | 6 | 7 | 13 | 0 | 26 |
- Date: January 1, 1952
- Season: 1951
- Stadium: Montgomery Stadium
- Location: Phoenix, Arizona
- MVP: RB Gene Shannon
- Attendance: 17,000

The 1952 Salad Bowl was a college football postseason bowl game between the Houston Cougars and the Dayton Flyers.

== Background ==
The Cougars finished 4th in the Missouri Valley Conference in their first season and earned a trip to their first bowl game. The Flyers were an independent school.

== Game summary ==
Bobby Recker gave Dayton a 7–0 lead on his touchdown run. With :10 remaining in the first quarter, Gene Shannon rushed for a touchdown to narrow the lead to 1. Recker caught a 25-yard pass from Frank Siggins to give Dayton a 14–6 lead. Less than five minutes later, Shannon rushed for his second touchdown to narrow the lead once again. Dayton increased their lead on Siggins' pass to Jim Currin to take a 21–13 lead with :44 remaining in the half. After halftime, the Cougars limited the Flyers to five rushing yards in the second half while forcing three turnovers. Shannon narrowed the lead once again on a 1-yard touchdown run to make it 21–20. Less than two minutes later, Shannon's 10-yard run with 7:50 in the third proved to be the go-ahead touchdown as the two teams failed to score in the fourth quarter, giving Houston their first bowl win. Shannon rushed for 175 yards on 28 carries with four touchdowns, including 129 yards in the first half.

== Aftermath ==
The Cougars wound up winning the conference the next year, finishing at #19 in the polls, though they would not play another bowl game until 1962. Dayton soon dropped down below Division I, now in the Football Championship Subdivision (FCS). After this Salad Bowl, the opponents would consist of high school teams and All-Stars, not involving college teams.

== Statistics ==
| Statistics | Houston | Dayton |
|---|---|---|
| First downs | 21 | 11 |
| Yards rushing | 341 | 124 |
| Yards passing | 124 | 183 |
| Total yards | 465 | 307 |
| Punts-Average | 4-34.7 | 6-45.8 |
| Fumbles-Lost | 6-3 | 3-1 |
| Interceptions | 1 | 2 |
| Penalties-Yards | 7-35 | 5-45 |
