= 1951 Oklahoma A&M Cowboys football team =

American college football season

1951 Oklahoma A&M Cowboys football
- Conference: Missouri Valley Conference
- Record: 3–7 (3–2 MVC)
- Head coach: Jennings B. Whitworth (2nd season)
- Home stadium: Lewis Field

1951 Missouri Valley Conference football standings
| | Conf. | | | | | Overall |
| Team | W | | L | | T | W | | L | | T |
|---|---|---|---|---|---|---|---|---|---|---|
| Tulsa $ | 4 | – | 0 | – | 0 | 9 | – | 2 | – | 0 |
| Drake | 3 | – | 1 | – | 0 | 7 | – | 2 | – | 0 |
| Oklahoma A&M | 3 | – | 2 | – | 0 | 3 | – | 7 | – | 0 |
| Houston | 2 | – | 2 | – | 0 | 6 | – | 5 | – | 0 |
| Detroit | 2 | – | 4 | – | 0 | 4 | – | 7 | – | 0 |
| Wichita | 2 | – | 4 | – | 0 | 2 | – | 7 | – | 0 |
| Bradley | 0 | – | 3 | – | 0 | 4 | – | 5 | – | 0 |
$ – Conference champion

The 1951 Oklahoma A&M Cowboys football team represented Oklahoma Agricultural and Mechanical College (later renamed Oklahoma State University–Stillwater) in the Missouri Valley Conference during the 1951 college football season. In their second season under head coach Whitworth, the Cowboys compiled a 3–7 record (3–2 against conference opponents), finished in third place in the conference, and were outscored by opponents by a combined total of 251 to 168. The team was ranked at No. 84 in the 1951 Litkenhous Ratings.

On offense, the 1951 team averaged 16.8 points, 171.0 rushing yards, and 159.7 passing yards per game. On defense, the team allowed an average of 25.1 points, 213.8 rushing yards and 131.4 passing yards per game. The team's statistical leaders included Ron Bennett with 385 rushing yards, Don Babers with 1,352 passing yards, George Wooden with 502 receiving yards, Roy Seeman with 48 points scored, and Bill Bredde with six interceptions.

End George Wooden received first-team All-Missouri Valley Conference honors.

The team played its home games at Lewis Field in Stillwater, Oklahoma.

== Schedule ==
| Date | Opponent | Site | Result | Attendance | Source |
|---|---|---|---|---|---|
| September 22 | Arkansas* | Lewis Field; Stillwater, OK | L 7–42 | 25,000 | |
| September 29 | at Missouri* | Memorial Stadium; Columbia, MO | L 26–27 | | |
| October 5 | at Washington State* | Rogers Field; Spokane, WA | L 13–27 | 18,000 | |
| October 13 | Wichita State | Lewis Field; Stillwater, OK | W 43–0 | | |
| October 20 | Drake | Lewis Field; Stillwater, OK (Johnny Bright incident) | W 27–14 | | |
| October 26 | at Detroit | University of Detroit Stadium; Detroit, MI | W 20–7 | 12,680 | |
| November 3 | Tulsa | Lewis Field; Stillwater, OK (rivalry) | L 7–35 | 28,000 | |
| November 17 | Kansas*^{†} | Lewis Field; Stillwater, OK | L 12–27 | 17,000 | |
| November 24 | at Houston | Rice Stadium; Houston, TX | L 7–31 | 12,500 | |
| December 1 | at Oklahoma* | Oklahoma Memorial Stadium; Norman OK (Bedlam Series) | L 6–41 | 33,103 | |
*Non-conference game; ^{†}Homecoming

== After the season ==
The 1952 NFL draft was held on January 17, 1952. The following Cowboys were selected.

| Round | Pick | Player | Position | NFL team |
|---|---|---|---|---|
| 17 | 197 | John Weigle | End | Philadelphia Eagles |
| 27 | 321 | Waldo Schaaf | Tackle | San Francisco 49ers |
