= 1951 Ohio Bobcats football team =

American college football season

1951 Ohio Bobcats football
- Conference: Mid-American Conference
- Record: 5–4–1 (2–2 MAC)
- Head coach: Carroll Widdoes (3rd season)
- Home stadium: Peden Stadium

1951 Mid-American Conference football standings
	Conf.					Overall
Team	W		L		T	W		L		T
Cincinnati $	3	–	0	–	0	10	–	1	–	0
Miami (OH)	3	–	1	–	0	7	–	3	–	0
Kent State	2	–	1	–	0	4	–	3	–	2
Ohio	2	–	2	–	0	5	–	4	–	1
Western Reserve	1	–	3	–	0	2	–	6	–	1
Western Michigan	0	–	4	–	0	4	–	4	–	0
$ – Conference champion

The 1951 Ohio Bobcats football team was an American football team that represented Ohio University in the Mid-American Conference (MAC) during the 1951 college football season. In their third season under head coach Carroll Widdoes, the Bobcats compiled a 5–4–1 record (2–2 against MAC opponents), finished in fourth place in the MAC, and outscored all opponents by a combined total of 167 to 141. They played their home games in Peden Stadium in Athens, Ohio.

The team's statistical leaders included Ed Roberts with 564 rushing yards, Larry Lawrence with 407 passing yards, and Gene Nuxhall with 236 receiving yards. Offensive tackle Al Scheide was named to the Little All-America Team.

== Schedule ==
Date	Opponent	Site	Result	Attendance	Source
September 22	at Morris Harvey*	Laidley Field; Charleston, WV	W 26–0		
September 29	Akron*	Peden Stadium; Athens, OH	W 40–7		
October 6	at Western Michigan	Waldo Stadium; Kalamazoo, MI	W 13–0	1,500	
October 13	Bowling Green*	Peden Stadium; Athens, OH	W 28–7		
October 20	at Miami (OH)	Miami Field; Oxford, OH (rivalry)	L 0–7		
October 27	Kent State	Peden Stadium; Athens, OH	W 28–27	12,000	
November 3	at Toledo*	Glass Bowl; Toledo, OH	L 6–13		
November 10	Cincinnati	Peden Stadium; Athens, OH	L 0–40		
November 17	Eastern Kentucky*	Peden Stadium; Athens, OH	L 13–27		
November 22	at Marshall*	Fairfield Stadium; Huntington, WV (rivalry)	T 13–13		
*Non-conference game
