= 1951 Detroit Titans football team =

American college football season

1951 Detroit Titans football
- Conference: Missouri Valley Conference
- Record: 4–7 (2–4 MVC)
- Head coach: Dutch Clark (1st season)
- Home stadium: University of Detroit Stadium

1951 Missouri Valley Conference football standings
	Conf.					Overall
Team	W		L		T	W		L		T
Tulsa $	4	–	0	–	0	9	–	2	–	0
Drake	3	–	1	–	0	7	–	2	–	0
Oklahoma A&M	3	–	2	–	0	3	–	7	–	0
Houston	2	–	2	–	0	6	–	5	–	0
Detroit	2	–	4	–	0	4	–	7	–	0
Wichita	2	–	4	–	0	2	–	7	–	0
Bradley	0	–	3	–	0	4	–	5	–	0
$ – Conference champion

The 1951 Detroit Titans football team represented the University of Detroit in the Missouri Valley Conference (MVC) during 1951 college football season. The team compiled a 4–7 record (2–4 against conference opponents), tied for fifth place in the MWC, and was outscored by opponents by a combined total of 263 to 156.

In February 1951, Dutch Clark, later inducted into both the Pro and College Football Halls of Fame, was hired as the school's athletic director and head football coach. He had served as the team's backfield coach under head coach Chuck Baer in 1951.

== Schedule ==
Date	Opponent	Site	Result	Attendance	Source
September 22	Toledo*	University of Detroit Stadium; Detroit, MI	W 34–32	17,391	
September 28	Houston	University of Detroit Stadium; Detroit, MI	L 7–33	13,521	
October 5	No. 5 Notre Dame*	Briggs Stadium; Detroit, MI	L 6–40	52,371	
October 12	at Drake	Drake Stadium; Des Moines, IA	L 6–26	15,000	
October 19	at Boston College*	Braves Field; Boston, MA	W 19–13	10,130	
October 26	Oklahoma A&M	University of Detroit Stadium; Detroit, MI	L 7–20	12,680	
November 3	at Bradley	Peoria, IL	W 7–6	1,500	
November 10	at Villanova*	Shibe Park; Philadelphia, PA	L 7–26	7,500	
November 17	at Marquette*	Marquette Stadium; Milwaukee, WI	L 13–26	8,000	
November 22	at Wichita	Veterans Field; Wichita, KS	W 9–7	5,689	
December 1	at Tulsa	Skelly Stadium; Tulsa, OK	L 20–34		
*Non-conference game; Rankings from AP Poll released prior to the game

== See also ==
- 1951 in Michigan
