= 1951 Western Reserve Red Cats football team =

American college football season

1951 Western Reserve Red Cats football
- Conference: Mid-American Conference
- Record: 2–6–1 (1–3 MAC)
- Head coach: Edward L. Finnigan (1st season)
- Home stadium: Clarke Field

1951 Mid-American Conference football standings
	Conf.					Overall
Team	W		L		T	W		L		T
Cincinnati $	3	–	0	–	0	10	–	1	–	0
Miami (OH)	3	–	1	–	0	7	–	3	–	0
Kent State	2	–	1	–	0	4	–	3	–	2
Ohio	2	–	2	–	0	5	–	4	–	1
Western Reserve	1	–	3	–	0	2	–	6	–	1
Western Michigan	0	–	4	–	0	4	–	4	–	0
$ – Conference champion

The 1951 Western Reserve Red Cats football team represented the Western Reserve University—now known as Case Western Reserve University—as a member of the Mid-American Conference (MAC) during the 1951 college football season. Led by first-year head coach Edward L. Finnigan, the Red Cats compiled an overall record of 2–6–1 with a mark of 1–3 in conference play, placing fifth in the MAC. Wes Stevens served as the team's line coach.

As the new home stadium, the expanded Clarke Field officially opened October 6, 1951 against the Kent State Golden Flashes. The new stadium had a capacity of 10,000 and the press box accommodated 100.

== Schedule ==
Date	Opponent	Site	Result	Attendance	Source
September 29	at Butler*	Butler Bowl; Indianapolis, IN	L 6–7	3,000	
October 6	Kent State	Clarke Field; Cleveland, OH	L 20–42		
October 13	Colgate*	Clarke Field; Cleveland, OH	L 7–28	6,500	
October 20	at Cincinnati	Nippert Stadium; Cincinnati, OH	L 0–41		
October 27	at Washington University*	Francis Field; St. Louis, MO	W 15–12	7,000	
November 3	at West Virginia*	Mountaineer Field; Morgantown, WV	L 7–35	5,000	
November 10	Western Michigan	Clarke Field; Cleveland, OH	W 27–26	4,100	
November 17	at Miami (OH)	Miami Field; Oxford, OH	L 7–34		
November 22	vs. Case Tech*	Shaw Stadium; East Cleveland, OH	T 13–13	7,263	
*Non-conference game
