= Joe Gavin =

American football coach (born 1908)

Joseph J. Gavin
Biographical details
- Born: March 20, 1908; Cleveland, Ohio, U.S.
- Died: May 31, 1955 (aged 47); Dayton, Ohio, U.S.
- Education: University of Notre Dame

Coaching career (HC unless noted)
- 1932–1946: Holy Name HS (OH)
- 1947–1953: Dayton

Head coaching record
- Overall: 84–37–13 (high school); 39–26–2 (college)
- Bowls: 0–1

Joseph J. Gavin (March 20, 1908 – May 31, 1955) was an American former football coach. He served as the head football coach at Holy Name High School from 1932 to 1946 and ay the University of Dayton from 1947 to 1953. He complied an overall record of 84–37–13 as a high school and of 39–26–2 as a college coach.

Gavin was murdered on May 31, 1955 when he was shot by a gunman at the Third National Bank in Dayton, Ohio.

== Head coaching record ==
=== College ===
Year	Team	Overall	Conference	Standing	Bowl/playoffs
Dayton Flyers (Independent) (1947–1953)
1947	Dayton	6–3			
1948	Dayton	7–2–1			
1949	Dayton	6–3			
1950	Dayton	4–6			
1951	Dayton	7–3			L Salad
1952	Dayton	6–5			
1953	Dayton	3–5–1			
Dayton:		39–26–2			
Total:		39–26–2			
