= 1951 Ohio Wesleyan Battling Bishops football team =

American college football season

1951 Ohio Wesleyan Battling Bishops football

OAC champion
- Conference: Ohio Athletic Conference
- Record: 8–1 (6–0 OAC)
- Head coach: Glenn Fraser (5th season)
- MVP: Dale Bruce
- Captain: Wally Cross

1951 Ohio Athletic Conference football standings
	Conf.					Overall
Team	W		L		T	W		L		T
Ohio Wesleyan $	6	–	0	–	0	8	–	1	–	0
Heidelberg	3	–	0	–	1	7	–	1	–	1
Mount Union	2	–	1	–	0	3	–	4	–	1
Muskingum	3	–	2	–	1	5	–	2	–	1
Denison	3	–	2	–	1	4	–	3	–	1
Oberlin	2	–	2	–	0	4	–	4	–	0
Otterbein	2	–	2	–	1	2	–	4	–	2
Wooster	2	–	3	–	0	6	–	3	–	0
Akron	1	–	3	–	0	1	–	8	–	0
Wittenberg	1	–	5	–	0	4	–	6	–	0
Capital	0	–	2	–	1	2	–	4	–	1
Marietta	0	–	3	–	1	2	–	4	–	1
$ – Conference champion

The 1951 Ohio Wesleyan Battling Bishops football team represented Ohio Wesleyan University as a member of the Ohio Athletic Conference (OAC) during the 1951 college football season. Led by fifth-year head coach Glenn Fraser, the Battling Bishops compiled an overall record of 8–1 with a mark of 6–0 in conference play, winning the OAC title.

== Schedule ==
Date	Time	Opponent	Site	Result	Attendance	Source
September 22		at Bowling Green*	University Stadium; Bowling Green, OH	L 13–23		
September 29		Otterbein	Delaware, OH	W 20–0		
October 5		at Buffalo*	Civic Stadium; Buffalo, NY	W 21–0	3,300	
October 13		Case Tech*	Delaware, OH	W 17–14		
October 20		Denison	Delaware, OH	W 21–14		
October 27		at Oberlin	Oberlin, OH	W 20–13		
November 3		at Mount Union	Alliance, OH	W 13–12		
November 10	2:00 p.m.	at Muskingum	New Concord, OH	W 69–6		
November 17		Wittenberg	Delaware, OH	W 34–0		
*Non-conference game; All times are in Eastern time
