= 1951 Houston Cougars football team =

American college football season

1951 Houston Cougars football

Salad Bowl champion

Salad Bowl, W 26–21 vs. Dayton
- Conference: Missouri Valley Conference
- Record: 6–5 (2–2 MVC)
- Head coach: Clyde Lee (4th season)
- Captains: Gene Shannon; John O'Hara; Buck Miller
- Home stadium: Rice Stadium

1951 Missouri Valley Conference football standings
| | Conf. | | | | | Overall |
| Team | W | | L | | T | W | | L | | T |
|---|---|---|---|---|---|---|---|---|---|---|
| Tulsa $ | 4 | – | 0 | – | 0 | 9 | – | 2 | – | 0 |
| Drake | 3 | – | 1 | – | 0 | 7 | – | 2 | – | 0 |
| Oklahoma A&M | 3 | – | 2 | – | 0 | 3 | – | 7 | – | 0 |
| Houston | 2 | – | 2 | – | 0 | 6 | – | 5 | – | 0 |
| Detroit | 2 | – | 4 | – | 0 | 4 | – | 7 | – | 0 |
| Wichita | 2 | – | 4 | – | 0 | 2 | – | 7 | – | 0 |
| Bradley | 0 | – | 3 | – | 0 | 4 | – | 5 | – | 0 |
$ – Conference champion

The 1951 Houston Cougars football team was an American football team that represented the University of Houston in the Missouri Valley Conference (MVC) during the 1951 college football season. In its fourth season under head coach Clyde Lee, the team compiled a 6–5 record, finished fourth in the MVC, and defeated Dayton in the 1952 Salad Bowl. Gene Shannon, John O'Hara, and Buck Miller were the team captains. The team was ranked at No. 63 in the 1951 Litkenhous Ratings.

The team played its home games at Rice Stadium in Houston.

== Schedule ==
| Date | Opponent | Site | Result | Attendance | Source |
|---|---|---|---|---|---|
| September 22 | No. 13 Baylor*^{†} | Rice Stadium; Houston, TX (rivalry) | L 0–19 | 55,000–60,000 | |
| September 28 | at Detroit | University of Detroit Stadium; Detroit, MI | W 33–7 | 13,521 | |
| October 6 | Texas Tech* | Rice Stadium; Houston, TX (rivalry) | W 6–0 | 15,000–24,000 | |
| October 13 | at Tulsa | Skelly Field; Tulsa, OK | L 27–46 | 14,651–15,000 | |
| October 20 | Hardin–Simmons* | Rice Stadium; Houston, TX | W 35–27 | 15,000 | |
| October 27 | Villanova* | Rice Stadium; Houston, TX | L 27–33 | 15,000 | |
| November 3 | at Wichita | Veterans Field; Wichita, KS | L 14–19 | 5,676 | |
| November 10 | at Louisville* | duPont Manual Stadium; Louisville, KY | L 28–35 | 2,500–3,000 | |
| November 24 | Oklahoma A&M | Rice Stadium; Houston, TX | W 31–7 | 12,500 | |
| November 30 | at North Texas State* | Eagle Field; Denton, TX | W 20–14 | | |
| January 1, 1952 | vs. Dayton* | Montgomery Stadium; Phoenix, AZ (Salad Bowl) | W 26–21 | 17,000 | |
*Non-conference game; ^{†}Homecoming; Rankings from AP Poll released prior to the game
