= 1951 Wichita Shockers football team =

American college football season

1951 Wichita Shockers football
- Conference: Missouri Valley Conference
- Record: 2–7 (2–4 MVC)
- Head coach: Bob Carlson (1st season)
- Home stadium: Veterans Field

1951 Missouri Valley Conference football standings
	Conf.					Overall
Team	W		L		T	W		L		T
Tulsa $	4	–	0	–	0	9	–	2	–	0
Drake	3	–	1	–	0	7	–	2	–	0
Oklahoma A&M	3	–	2	–	0	3	–	7	–	0
Houston	2	–	2	–	0	6	–	5	–	0
Detroit	2	–	4	–	0	4	–	7	–	0
Wichita	2	–	4	–	0	2	–	7	–	0
Bradley	0	–	3	–	0	4	–	5	–	0
$ – Conference champion

The 1951 Wichita Shockers football team was an American football team that represented Wichita University (now known as Wichita State University) as a member of the Missouri Valley Conference during the 1951 college football season. In its first season under head coach Bob Carlson, the team compiled a 2–7 record (2–4 against conference opponents), tied for fifth place out of seven teams in the MVC, and was outscored by a total of 200 to 74. The team played its home games at Veterans Field, now known as Cessna Stadium.

== Schedule ==
Date	Opponent	Site	Result	Attendance	Source
September 22	Miami (OH)*	Veterans Field; Wichita, KS	L 13–21		
September 28	at Utah State*	Romney Stadium; Logan, UT	L 7–21		
October 6	Bradley	Veterans Field; Wichita, KS	W 15–6	9,300	
October 13	at Oklahoma A&M	Lewis Field; Stillwater, OK	L 0–43		
October 27	Tulsa	Veterans Field; Wichita, KS	L 0–33	8,082	
November 3	Houston*	Veterans Field; Wichita, KS	W 19–14	6,000	
November 10	Drake	Veterans Field; Wichita, KS	L 7–14		
November 17	at Boston University	Fenway Park; Boston, MA	L 6–39	8,442	
November 23	Detroit	Veterans Field; Wichita, KS	L 7–9	5,689	
*Non-conference game
