= 1951 Drake Bulldogs football team =

American college football season

1951 Drake Bulldogs football
- Conference: Missouri Valley Conference
- Record: 7–2 (3–1 MVC)
- Head coach: Warren Gaer (3rd season)
- Home stadium: Drake Stadium

1951 Missouri Valley Conference football standings
	Conf.					Overall
Team	W		L		T	W		L		T
Tulsa $	4	–	0	–	0	9	–	2	–	0
Drake	3	–	1	–	0	7	–	2	–	0
Oklahoma A&M	3	–	2	–	0	3	–	7	–	0
Houston	2	–	2	–	0	6	–	5	–	0
Detroit	2	–	4	–	0	4	–	7	–	0
Wichita	2	–	4	–	0	2	–	7	–	0
Bradley	0	–	3	–	0	4	–	5	–	0
$ – Conference champion

The 1951 Drake Bulldogs football team was an American football team that represented Drake University as a member of the Missouri Valley Conference during the 1951 college football season. In its third season under head coach Warren Gaer, the team compiled a 7–2 record (3–1 against MVC opponents), tied for fourth place in the conference, and outscored opponents by a total of 247 to 117. The team was ranked at No. 80 in the 1951 Litkenhous Ratings.

On October 20, 1951, Drake halfback Johnny Bright, an African-American athlete and Heisman Trophy candidate, was assaulted by a white player during a game against Oklahoma A&M. The assault resulted in a broken jaw to Bright. When the Missouri Valley Conference refused to discipline Oklahoma A&M, despite evidence of a concerted and racially motivated plan to injure Bright, Drake withdrew from the conference in protest. In 2005, Oklahoma State's president issued a letter of apology for the incident which has become known at the Johnny Bright incident.

Bright had led the nation in total offense in both 1949 and 1950. See List of NCAA major college football yearly total offense leaders. At the end of the 1951 season, he was selected by the United Press, based on voting from 260 sports writers and broadcasters, as a second-team player on the 1951 College Football All-America Team. Bright later played 11 seasons in the Canadian Football League and was inducted into both the College Football Hall of Fame and the Canadian Football Hall of Fame.

The team played its home games at Drake Stadium in Des Moines, Iowa.

== Schedule ==
Date	Opponent	Site	Result	Attendance	Source
September 14	Abilene Christian*	Drake Stadium; Des Moines, IA	W 19–7	8,000	
September 22	at Denver*	Hilltop Stadium; Denver, CO	W 20–7	15,680	
September 29	at Bradley	Peoria Stadium; Peoria, IL	W 20–14		
October 6	Iowa State Teachers*	Drake Stadium; Des Moines, IA (rivalry)	W 39–6		
October 12	Detroit	Drake Stadium; Des Moines, IA	W 26–6	15,000	
October 20	at Oklahoma A&M	Lewis Field; Stillwater, OK	L 14–27		
October 27	Iowa State*	Drake Stadium; Des Moines, IA	L 0–13		
November 3	Great Lakes Navy*	Drake Stadium; Des Moines, IA	W 35–20		
November 10	at Wichita	Cessna Stadium; Wichita, KS	W 14–7		
*Non-conference game
