= 1951 Toledo Rockets football team =

American college football season

1951 Toledo Rockets football
- Conference: Independent
- Record: 6–4
- Head coach: Don Greenwood (1st season; first 7 games); Claire Dunn (1st season, final 3 games)
- Home stadium: Glass Bowl

1951 Midwestern college football independents records
	Conf.			Overall
Team	W	L	T	W		L		T
No. 2 Michigan State		–		9	–	0	–	0
Xavier		–		9	–	0	–	1
Wabash		–		7	–	0	–	1
No. 13 Notre Dame		–		7	–	2	–	1
Dayton		–		7	–	3	–	0
Michigan Tech		–		4	–	2	–	1
Toledo		–		6	–	4	–	0
Washington University		–		5	–	4	–	0
Wayne		–		5	–	4	–	0
Bowling Green		–		4	–	4	–	1
Marquette		–		4	–	6	–	1
Baldwin–Wallace		–		3	–	5	–	0
John Carroll		–		3	–	6	–	0
Rose Poly		–		2	–	5	–	0
Youngstown		–		2	–	6	–	1
Rankings from AP Poll

The 1951 Toledo Rockets football team was an American football team that represented Toledo University during the 1951 college football season. In their first season under head coaches Don Greenwood (games 1–7) and Claire Dunn (games 8–10), the Rockets compiled a 6–4 record and outscored their opponents by a combined total of 260 to 178.

The team's statistical leaders (through nine games) included Steve Piskach with 493 passing yards and A. C. Jenkins with 899 rushing yards.

Toledo was ranked at No. 100 in the 1951 Litkenhous Ratings.

== Schedule ==
Date	Opponent	Site	Result	Attendance	Source
September 15	Davis & Elkins	Glass Bowl; Toledo, OH	W 88–0		
September 22	at Detroit	University of Detroit Stadium; Detroit, MI	L 32–34	17,391	
September 29	Western Michigan	Glass Bowl; Toledo, OH	L 6–14		
October 6	John Carroll	Glass Bowl; Toledo, OH	W 26–12		
October 13	at Dayton	Dayton, OH	L 7–47		
October 20	Marshall	Glass Bowl; Toledo, OH	W 32–14		
October 27	at Bowling Green	Bowling Green, OH (rivalry)	W 12–6		
November 3	Ohio	Glass Bowl; Toledo, OH	W 13–6		
November 10	Bradley	Glass Bowl; Toledo, OH	W 38–13	4,800	
November 22	at Xavier	Xavier Stadium; Cincinnati, OH	L 6–32	6,500	
