= 1951 Tulsa Golden Hurricane football team =

American college football season

1951 Tulsa Golden Hurricane football

MVC champion
- Conference: Missouri Valley Conference
- Record: 9–2 (4–0 MVC)
- Head coach: Buddy Brothers (6th season)
- Home stadium: Skelly Field

1951 Missouri Valley Conference football standings
	Conf.					Overall
Team	W		L		T	W		L		T
Tulsa $	4	–	0	–	0	9	–	2	–	0
Drake	3	–	1	–	0	7	–	2	–	0
Oklahoma A&M	3	–	2	–	0	3	–	7	–	0
Houston	2	–	2	–	0	6	–	5	–	0
Detroit	2	–	4	–	0	4	–	7	–	0
Wichita	2	–	4	–	0	2	–	7	–	0
Bradley	0	–	3	–	0	4	–	5	–	0
$ – Conference champion

The 1951 Tulsa Golden Hurricane football team represented the University of Tulsa during the 1951 college football season. In their sixth year under head coach Buddy Brothers, the Golden Hurricane compiled a 9–2 record, 4–0 against conference opponents, and won the Missouri Valley Conference championship. The team's losses were against Cincinnati (47–35) and Arkansas (24–7) The team was ranked at No. 32 in the 1951 Litkenhous Ratings.

== Schedule ==
Date	Opponent	Site	Result	Attendance	Source
September 22	Hawaii*	Skelly Field; Tulsa, OK	W 58–0	14,479	
September 29	at Cincinnati*	Nippert Stadium; Cincinnati, OH	L 35–47	19,000–25,000	
October 13	Houston	Skelly Field; Tulsa, OK	W 46–27	14,651–15,000	
October 20	Marquette*	Skelly Field; Tulsa, OK	W 27–21	17,500	
October 27	at Wichita	Veterans Field; Wichita, KS	W 33–0	8,082	
November 3	at Oklahoma A&M	Lewis Field; Stillwater, OK (rivalry)	W 35–7	28,000	
November 10	Kansas State*^{†}	Skelly Field; Tulsa, OK	W 42–26	13,226	
November 17	Texas Tech*	Skelly Field; Tulsa, OK	W 21–14	9,984–12,000	
November 24	at Arkansas*	War Memorial Stadium; Little Rock, AR	L 7–24	11,500	
December 1	Detroit	Skelly Field; Tulsa, OK	W 34–20	8,025	
December 8	Hardin–Simmons*	Skelly Field; Tulsa, OK	W 33–14	5,282	
*Non-conference game; ^{†}Homecoming

== After the season ==
=== 1952 NFL draft ===
The following Golden Hurricane players were in the selected in the 1952 NFL draft following the season.

Round	Pick	Player	Position	NFL club
6	70	Jim Beasley	Center	San Francisco 49ers
12	145	Jake Roberts	Back	Los Angeles Rams
14	161	Bob Stringer	Linebacker	Philadelphia Eagles
