= 1951 Washington University Bears football team =

American college football season

1951 Washington University Bears football
- Conference: Independent
- Record: 5–4
- Head coach: Irwin Uteritz (3rd season)
- Home stadium: Francis Field

1951 Midwestern college football independents records
	Conf.			Overall
Team	W	L	T	W		L		T
No. 2 Michigan State		–		9	–	0	–	0
Xavier		–		9	–	0	–	1
Wabash		–		7	–	0	–	1
No. 13 Notre Dame		–		7	–	2	–	1
Dayton		–		7	–	3	–	0
Michigan Tech		–		4	–	2	–	1
Toledo		–		6	–	4	–	0
Washington University		–		5	–	4	–	0
Wayne		–		5	–	4	–	0
Bowling Green		–		4	–	4	–	1
Marquette		–		4	–	6	–	1
Baldwin–Wallace		–		3	–	5	–	0
John Carroll		–		3	–	6	–	0
Rose Poly		–		2	–	5	–	0
Youngstown		–		2	–	6	–	1
Rankings from AP Poll

The 1951 Washington University Bears football team represented Washington University in St. Louis as an independent during the 1951 college football season. Led by third-year head coach Irwin Uteritz, the Bears compiled a record of 5–4. Washington University played home games at Francis Field in St. Louis.

== Schedule ==
Date	Time	Opponent	Site	Result	Attendance	Source
September 29		Missouri Mines	Francis Field; St. Louis, MO	W 21–8	6,241	
October 6		Central (MO)	Francis Field; St. Louis, MO	W 33–0	3,500	
October 13	2:00 p.m.	Southern Illinois	Francis Field; St. Louis, MO	W 25–6	4,000	
October 20		at Western Michigan	Waldo Stadium; Kalamazoo, MI	L 7–12	8,000	
October 27		Western Reserve^{†}	Francis Field; St. Louis, MO	L 12–15	7,000	
November 3		at Wayne	University of Detroit Stadium; Detroit, MI	L 7–21	3,211	
November 10		Butler	Francis Field; St. Louis, MO	W 20–13	2,000	
November 17	1:30 p.m.	at Illinois Wesleyan	Illinois Wesleyan Stadium; Bloomington, IL	L 7–14		
November 24	2:00 p.m.	Sewanee	Francis Field; St. Louis, MO	W 31–13		
^{†}Homecoming; All times are in Central time
