= 1951 Cincinnati Bearcats football team =

American college football season

1951 Cincinnati Bearcats football

MAC champion
- Conference: Mid-American Conference
- Record: 10–1 (3–0 MAC)
- Head coach: Sid Gillman (3rd season)
- Captains: Ralph Staub; Nick Shundrich
- Home stadium: Nippert Stadium

1951 Mid-American Conference football standings
	Conf.					Overall
Team	W		L		T	W		L		T
Cincinnati $	3	–	0	–	0	10	–	1	–	0
Miami (OH)	3	–	1	–	0	7	–	3	–	0
Kent State	2	–	1	–	0	4	–	3	–	2
Ohio	2	–	2	–	0	5	–	4	–	1
Western Reserve	1	–	3	–	0	2	–	6	–	1
Western Michigan	0	–	4	–	0	4	–	4	–	0
$ – Conference champion

The 1951 Cincinnati Bearcats football team was an American football team that represented the University of Cincinnati as a member of the Mid-American Conference (MAC) during the 1951 college football season. In their third year under head coach Sid Gillman, the Bearcats compiled a 10–1 record and won the MAC championship. Dick Forbes in The Cincinnati Enquirer called it the Bearcats' "greatest season of all time"

Key players included halfbacks Frank "Dix" Anthony and Jack Gordon, quarterback Gene Rossi, fullback Bob Dougherty (the "Bellevue Bulldozer"), ends Ralph Staub and Dick Jarvis, and guard Bill Shalosky.

The team was ranked No. 34 in the 1951 Litkenhous Ratings.

The team played its home games at Nippert Stadium in Cincinnati, Ohio.

== Schedule ==
Date	Time	Opponent	Rank	Site	Result	Attendance	Source
September 15		VMI*		Nippert Stadium; Cincinnati, OH	W 26–7	24,000	
September 22		at Kansas State*		Memorial Stadium; Manhattan, KS	W 34–0		
September 29		Tulsa*		Nippert Stadium; Cincinnati, OH	W 47–35	19,000–25,000	
October 6		Hawaii*		Nippert Stadium; Cincinnati, OH	W 34–0	20,000	
October 13	8:30 p.m.	Louisville*		Nippert Stadium; Cincinnati, OH	W 38–0	16,000	
October 20		Western Reserve		Nippert Stadium; Cincinnati, OH	W 41–0		
October 27		Texas Western*^{†}		Nippert Stadium; Cincinnati, OH	W 53–18	16,000	
November 3		at Hardin–Simmons*		Fair Park Stadium; Abilene, TX	W 13–12	8,000	
November 10		at Ohio		Peden Stadium; Athens, OH	W 40–0		
November 17		Xavier*	No. 20	Nippert Stadium; Cincinnati, OH (Rivalry)	L 0–26	> 30,000	
November 24		Miami (OH)		Nippert Stadium; Cincinnati, OH (Victory Bell)	W 19–14	17,000	
*Non-conference game; ^{†}Homecoming; Rankings from Coaches' Poll released prior to the game; All times are in Eastern time
