= 1951 Morris Harvey Golden Eagles football team =

American college football season

1951 Morris Harvey Golden Eagles football

WVIAC champion Burley Bowl champion

Burley Bowl, W 27–20 vs. Lebanon Valley
- Conference: West Virginia Intercollegiate Athletic Conference
- Record: 6–3–1 (4–0 WVIAC)
- Head coach: Eddie King (6th season)
- Home stadium: Laidley Field

1951 West Virginia Intercollegiate Athletic Conference football standings
	Conf.					Overall
Team	W		L		T	W		L		T
Morris Harvey $	4	–	0	–	0	6	–	3	–	1
West Virginia Tech	5	–	1	–	0	7	–	1	–	0
Potomac State	3	–	1	–	0	4	–	1	–	0
Fairmont State	4	–	2	–	0	6	–	3	–	0
Davis & Elkins	4	–	2	–	0	4	–	4	–	0
West Liberty State	2	–	2	–	0	3	–	5	–	0
Glenville State	3	–	4	–	0	3	–	4	–	0
Shepherd	1	–	3	–	0	3	–	5	–	0
Concord	1	–	5	–	0	1	–	7	–	0
Salem	0	–	6	–	0	0	–	8	–	0
Bethany (WV) *	0	–	1	–	0	3	–	5	–	0
$ – Conference champion; * – Did not qualify for conference standings Conference standings based on power ratings

The 1951 Morris Harvey Golden Eagles football team represented the Morris Harvey College—now known as the University of Charleston as a member of the West Virginia Intercollegiate Athletic Conference (WVIAC) during the 1951 college football season. Led by sixth-year head coach Eddie King, the Golden Eagles compiled an overall record of 6–3–1 with a mark of 4–0 in conference play, winning the WVIAC title. Morris Harvey was invited to the Burley Bowl, where the Golden Eagles defeated Lebanon Valley. The team played home games at Laidley Field in Charleston, West Virginia.

== Schedule ==
Date	Time	Opponent	Site	Result	Attendance	Source
September 22		Ohio*	Laidley Field; Charleston, WV	L 0–26		
September 29		vs. West Liberty State	Wheeling, WV	W 34–0		
October 6		Concord	Laidley Field; Charleston, WV	W 56–0		
October 13		West Virginia Tech	Laidley Field; Charleston, WV	W 28–7	8,000	
October 20		at Kent State*	Memorial Stadium; Kent, OH	T 14–14		
October 27		Marshall*^{†}	Laidley Field; Charleston, WV	L 0–19	9,000	
November 3		at Heidelberg*	Tiffin, OH	W 21–20		
November 10		Davis & Elkins	Laidley Field; Charleston, WV	W 23–0		
November 17		at Camp Lejeune*	Camp Lejeune, NC	L 7–21		
November 22	2:15 p.m.	vs. Lebanon Valley*	Roosevelt Memorial Stadium; Johnson City, TN (Burley Bowl)	W 27–20	9,000	
*Non-conference game; ^{†}Homecoming; All times are in Eastern time
