= 1951 Colorado Buffaloes football team =

American college football season

1951 Colorado Buffaloes football
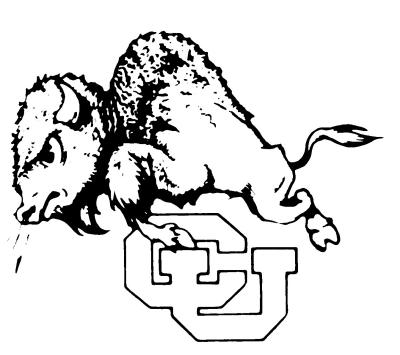
- Conference: Big Seven Conference
- Record: 7–3 (5–1 Big 7)
- Head coach: Dallas Ward (4th season)
- Captain: Game captains
- Home stadium: Folsom Field

1951 Big Seven Conference football standings
	Conf.					Overall
Team	W		L		T	W		L		T
No. 10 Oklahoma $	6	–	0	–	0	8	–	2	–	0
Colorado	5	–	1	–	0	7	–	3	–	0
Kansas	4	–	2	–	0	8	–	2	–	0
Iowa State	2	–	4	–	0	4	–	4	–	1
Nebraska	2	–	4	–	0	2	–	8	–	0
Missouri	2	–	4	–	0	3	–	7	–	0
Kansas State	0	–	6	–	0	0	–	9	–	0
$ – Conference champion; Rankings from AP Poll

The 1951 Colorado Buffaloes football team was an American football team that represented the University of Colorado as a member of the Big Seven Conference during the 1951 college football season. Led by fourth-year head coach Dallas Ward, the Buffaloes compiled an overall record of 7–3 with a mark of 5–1 in conference play, placing second in the Big 7.

== Schedule ==
Date	Opponent	Site	Result	Attendance	Source
September 22	Colorado A&M*	Folsom Field; Boulder, CO (rivalry)	W 28–13	18,913	
September 29	at Northwestern*	Dyche Stadium; Evanston, IL	L 14–35	42,000	
October 6	No. 20 Kansas	Folsom Field; Boulder, CO	W 35–27	29,367	
October 13	Missouri	Folsom Field; Boulder, CO	W 34–13	21,331	
October 20	at Kansas State	Memorial Stadium; Manhattan, KS (rivalry)	W 20–7	14,523	
October 27	at Oklahoma	Oklahoma Memorial Stadium; Norman, OK	L 14–55	46,686	
November 3	Iowa State^{†}	Folsom Field; Boulder, CO	W 47–20	23,462	
November 10	Utah*	Folsom Field; Boulder, CO (rivalry)	W 54–0	14,048	
November 17	at Nebraska	Memorial Stadium; Lincoln, NE (rivalry)	W 36–14	34,000	
November 24	at No. 2 Michigan State*	Macklin Stadium; East Lansing, MI	L 7–45	29,987	
*Non-conference game; ^{†}Homecoming; Rankings from AP Poll released prior to the game

== After the season ==
=== NFL draft ===
The following Buffaloes were selected in 1952 NFL draft following the season.

Round	Pick	Player	Position	NFL club
4	38	Merwin Hodel	Back	New York Giants
5	50	Jack Jorguson	Tackle	New York Yanks
29	345	Chuck Mosher	End	San Francisco 49ers
