= 1951 Oklahoma Sooners football team =

American college football season

1951 Oklahoma Sooners football

Big 7 champion
- Conference: Big Seven Conference

Ranking
- Coaches: No. 11
- AP: No. 10
- Record: 8–2 (6–0 Big 7)
- Head coach: Bud Wilkinson (5th season)
- Captains: Bert Clark; Jim Weatherall
- Home stadium: Oklahoma Memorial Stadium

1951 Big Seven Conference football standings
	Conf.					Overall
Team	W		L		T	W		L		T
No. 10 Oklahoma $	6	–	0	–	0	8	–	2	–	0
Colorado	5	–	1	–	0	7	–	3	–	0
Kansas	4	–	2	–	0	8	–	2	–	0
Iowa State	2	–	4	–	0	4	–	4	–	1
Nebraska	2	–	4	–	0	2	–	8	–	0
Missouri	2	–	4	–	0	3	–	7	–	0
Kansas State	0	–	6	–	0	0	–	9	–	0
$ – Conference champion; Rankings from AP Poll

The 1951 Oklahoma Sooners football team represented the University of Oklahoma during the 1951 college football season. They played their home games at Oklahoma Memorial Stadium and competed as members of the Big Seven Conference. They were coached by head coach Bud Wilkinson.

== Schedule ==
Date	Opponent	Rank	Site	Result	Attendance	Source
September 29	William & Mary*	No. 4	Oklahoma Memorial Stadium; Norman, OK	W 49–7	39,184	
October 6	at No. 10 Texas A&M*	No. 4	Kyle Field; College Station, TX	L 7–14	34,789–40,000	
October 13	vs. No. 6 Texas*		Cotton Bowl; Dallas, TX (Red River Shootout)	L 7–9	75,080	
October 20	Kansas	No. 19	Oklahoma Memorial Stadium; Norman, OK	W 33–21	44,462	
October 27	Colorado		Oklahoma Memorial Stadium; Norman, OK	W 55–14	46,686	
November 3	at Kansas State	No. 17	Memorial Stadium; Manhattan, KS	W 33–0	11,248	
November 10	at Missouri	No. 14	Memorial Stadium; Columbia, MO (rivalry)	W 34–20	23,198	
November 17	Iowa State	No. 12	Oklahoma Memorial Stadium; Norman, OK	W 35–6	34,761	
November 24	at Nebraska	No. 12	Memorial Stadium; Lincoln, NE (rivalry)	W 27–0	33,698	
December 1	Oklahoma A&M*	No. 10	Oklahoma Memorial Stadium; Norman, OK (Bedlam Series)	W 41–6	33,103	
*Non-conference game; Rankings from AP Poll released prior to the game

== Rankings ==
Ranking movements Legend: ██ Increase in ranking ██ Decrease in ranking — = Not ranked ( ) = First-place votes
	Week												
Poll	Pre	1	2	3	4	5	6	7	8	9	10	11	Final
AP	4 (16)	4 (16)	4 (16)	4 (18)	11	19	—	17 (1)	14 (1)	12 (1)	12	10 (2)	10 (4)

== Roster ==
- QB Eddie Crowder, Jr.
- G J. D. Roberts, So.
- HB Billy Vessels, Jr.
- T Jim Weatherall, Sr.
- E Carl Allison, Fr.

== NFL draft ==
The following players were drafted into the National Football League following the season.

Round	Pick	Player	Position	NFL team
2	17	Jim Weatherall	Tackle	Philadelphia Eagles
16	192	Ed Rowland	Tackle	Cleveland Browns
