= 1951 Missouri Tigers football team =

American college football season

1951 Missouri Tigers football
- Conference: Big Seven Conference
- Record: 3–7 (2–4 Big 7)
- Head coach: Don Faurot (14th season)
- Home stadium: Memorial Stadium

1951 Big Seven Conference football standings
	Conf.					Overall
Team	W		L		T	W		L		T
No. 10 Oklahoma $	6	–	0	–	0	8	–	2	–	0
Colorado	5	–	1	–	0	7	–	3	–	0
Kansas	4	–	2	–	0	8	–	2	–	0
Iowa State	2	–	4	–	0	4	–	4	–	1
Nebraska	2	–	4	–	0	2	–	8	–	0
Missouri	2	–	4	–	0	3	–	7	–	0
Kansas State	0	–	6	–	0	0	–	9	–	0
$ – Conference champion; Rankings from AP Poll

The 1951 Missouri Tigers football team was an American football team that represented the University of Missouri in the Big Seven Conference (Big 7) during the 1951 college football season. The team compiled a 3–7 record (2–4 against Big 7 opponents, *Kansas St. was forced to forfeit due to use of ineligible players), finished in a tie for fourth place in the Big 7, and was outscored by all opponents by a combined total of 292 to 169. Don Faurot was the head coach for the 14th of 19 seasons. Missouri was ranked at No. 86 in the 1951 Litkenhous Ratings.

The team's statistical leaders included Junior Wren with 451 rushing yards and 708 yards of total offense, Tony Scardino with 653 passing yards, Harold Carter with 456 receiving yards, and James Hook with 36 points scored.

The team played its home games at Memorial Stadium in Columbia, Missouri.

== Schedule ==
Date	Opponent	Site	Result	Attendance	Source
September 22	Fordham*	Memorial Stadium; Columbia, MO	L 20–34	18,000	
September 29	Oklahoma A&M*	Memorial Stadium; Columbia, MO	W 27–26		
October 6	at SMU*	Cotton Bowl; Dallas, TX	L 0–34	40,000	
October 13	at Colorado	Folsom Field; Boulder, CO	L 13–34	21,331	
October 20	at Iowa State	Clyde Williams Field; Ames, IA (rivalry)	L 14–21	9,264	
October 27	Nebraska	Memorial Stadium; Columbia, MO (rivalry)	W 35–19		
November 3	at No. 4 Maryland*	Byrd Stadium; College Park, MD	L 0–35	23,612	
November 10	No. 14 Oklahoma	Memorial Stadium; Columbia, MO (rivalry)	L 20–34	23,198	
November 17	Kansas State	Memorial Stadium; Columbia, MO	W 12–14 (Kansas State forfeit)	13,545	
December 1	at Kansas	Memorial Stadium; Lawrence, KS (Border War)	L 28–41	35,000	
*Non-conference game; Rankings from AP Poll released prior to the game
