= Don Coleman (offensive tackle) =

American football player (1928–2017)

- Coleman in 1951

No. 78
- Position: Offensive tackle

Personal information
- Born: May 4, 1928; Ponca City, Oklahoma, U.S.
- Died: January 30, 2017 (aged 88)
- Listed height: 5 ft 10 in (1.78 m)
- Listed weight: 180 lb (82 kg)

Career information
- High school: Central (Flint, Michigan)
- College: Michigan State (1949–1951)

Awards and highlights
- National champion (1951); Unanimous All-American (1951); Michigan State Spartans No. 78 retired
- College Football Hall of Fame

Don Edwin Coleman (May 4, 1928 – January 30, 2017) was an American college football player. He played for Michigan State Spartans, where he was a unanimous All-American in 1951, the first African-American All-American football player at Michigan State. He was also the first Michigan State player to have his jersey number retired by the school. In 1968, he also became the first African-American to serve on the coaching staff at Michigan State. Coleman was elected to the College Football Hall of Fame in 1975 as a player.

== Early life ==
Coleman was born in Ponca City, Oklahoma in 1928 and moved with his family to Flint, Michigan before his freshman year in high school. His father shined shoes at Flint's Durant Hotel, worked as a hotel porter, and worked in the automobile factories.

Coleman did not play football until his senior year at Flint Central High School. Two of Coleman's older brothers had died in their youth, one from drowning and the other from pneumonia. Coleman's mother did not want her youngest son to be injured playing football. Accordingly, Coleman played No.1 trumpet in the high school band and competed in swimming for three years. When Flint Central had a swim meet with Royal Oak High School, the Royal Oak coach "made it known Coleman would not be allowed to swim because a black swimmer had never been in their pool." Flint Central swim coach, Bob Richardson, stood behind Coleman and told the Royal Oak coach that, "if Don Coleman couldn't swim, then the rest of the Flint Central team would not swim." Coleman became the first black swimmer to enter Royal Oak's pool.

As a senior in 1947, Coleman's mother finally agreed to allow her son to play football. In his first year of football, he was selected as an all-state guard and led Flint Central to the state championship.

== Michigan State football player ==
After graduating from Flint Central, Coleman enrolled at Michigan State University, then known as Michigan State College. He played principally at the tackle position for Biggie Munn's Michigan State Spartans from 1949 to 1951. At 178 pounds, he was the lightest player on the 1949 Michigan State football team. Coleman made up for what he lacked in size with quickness and intensity. Long-time Michigan State sports information director Fred Stabley in 1972 named Coleman as one of the two best players he saw at Michigan State and recalled that, despite his size, Coleman was "so quick and played with such intensity. He loved to play against big men. The 250 pounders were his meat." In 1952, the Chicago Daily Tribune wrote that Coleman "probably is packed with more football per pound than any man in the United States."

Coleman was also Michigan States's first unanimous All-American football player and its first African-American All-American. Michigan State under Biggie Munn and Duffy Daugherty earned a reputation as one of the leaders in racial integration of football, and Coleman was the first of many great African-American stars to play for the Spartans. In 1953, a feature story on racial integration of football cited the example of Coleman:

"In 1951, for instance, as for two years previously, their watch-charm tackle, Don Coleman, was one of the world's best football players. Weighing only 180 pounds, Coleman employed quickness, agility, brains and courage to win unanimous selection as an All-American in 1951. At Michigan State, he is perpetually nominated as one of the greatest football players of all time."

Interviewed in 1996 about Michigan State's role in integrating the sport, Coleman noted, "We changed the rules, changed the game and changed some attitudes. What we did at Michigan State helped everyone take a step closer to better understanding those who before that had no prior contact with one another."

As a junior in 1950, Coleman played at every position on the left side of the line for Michigan State and was selected as the Midwest lineman of the week following a season-opening win over the Michigan Wolverines. Michigan coach Bennie Oosterbaan said that Coleman's only rival among Big Ten lineman was Bronko Nagurski. Oosterbaan added, "Pound for pound, the Big Ten has never seen a better tackler than Don Coleman, who was smart, quick as a cat, and a deadly, fearless tackler."

As a senior year in 1951, Coleman was selected as the Most Valuable Player on the undefeated 1951 Michigan State Spartans football team and received the Governor of Michigan Award. In presenting Coleman with the award, Michigan Governor Mennen Williams said, "A couple of those tackles I saw you make in the Notre Dame game were enough to convince me." Coleman was credited with being the key to the Michigan State offense in 1951. Line coach Duffy Daugherty pointed to a Coleman blocks in the Marquette game as "one of the greatest plays by an offensive lineman that I've ever seen." According to Daugherty, Coleman was knocked to the ground, but got up, caught and passed the Michigan State ball carrier (Leroy Bolden) and "still made the key block that let him go for 33 yards." Daugherty later credited Coleman with "changing the concept of offensive football at Michigan State" and added, "He gave me a lesson which made football a winning proposition at the school for ten of the next twelve years." Daugherty went even further in 1954 with the following words of praise for Coleman:

"If you want to pick a player on the basis of how close to perfection he is in whatever position he plays, I'll say Coleman was the greatest."

Coleman was also a talented special teams player. Against Michigan in 1951, he tackled the Michigan kick returner on the nine yard line on the opening kickoff. Against Ohio State that same year, he tackled the return man at the seven yard line on the opening kickoff.

At the end of the 1951 season, Coleman was selected as a first-team All-American on 13 All-American teams, including teams selected by the Associated Press and United Press. In choosing him for its All-American team, the Associated Press referred to Coleman as "the catlike tackle."

Coleman was also the runner-up to Oklahoma's Jim Weatherall for the Outland Trophy. At the Outland Trophy award ceremony, Coleman met Kentucky football coach Paul "Bear" Bryant. Bryant, whose Kentucky Wildcats team was segregated at the time, told Coleman, "You can play on my team anytime."

Coleman was also selected to play in three post-season honor games, including the East-West Shrine Game, the Hula Bowl and the College All-Star Game. In an interview with the Chicago Daily Tribune prior to the College All-Star Game in August 1952, Coleman emphasized his pride in being an All-American both athletically and scholastically. He noted, "I think it's wonderful that football gave me a college education."

In February 1953, an investigation by the Big Ten Conference revealed that a Michigan State booster organization known as the "Spartan Foundation" had either given or loaned a total of $3,183 to ten players on the 1951 football team, including Coleman. As a result of the finding, the Conference placed Michigan State on probation for one year.

In 1956, the Associated Press reported that the No. 7 position on the short side of the Michigan State line was still being called "The Coleman Tackle." Starting with Coleman, Michigan State played only one lineman on the short side between the center and end positions. With Coleman on the short side, "with his speed and ability to knock down a couple of men on any given play," Michigan State placed an emphasis on plays developing from the short side. One of the Michigan State coaches said, "Coleman taught us things about playing tackle we never thought could be done."

== Professional football and military service ==
Coleman was drafted by the Chicago Cardinals in the eighth round (88th overall pick) of the 1952 NFL draft. Coleman initially "turned down all offers" from the Cardinals, saying that he felt he was too small at 185 pounds to make much of a showing in professional football. In August 1952, Coleman noted that any thought he may have had of playing for the Cardinals vanished when he was drafted into the U.S. Army. He was required to report to Fort Lee, Virginia, after appearing in the College All-Star Game in August 1952. Coleman served for two years in the U.S. Army, including one year in Korea.

After being discharged from the Army, Coleman signed with the Cardinals and reported to training camp in August 1954. He appeared in the Cardinals' starting lineup for an exhibition game against the Green Bay Packers at Minneapolis. On September 1, 1954, the Cardinals traded Coleman to the Green Bay Packers for defensive halfback Marvin Johnson. Coleman chose not to play for the Packers and instead returned to Flint, Michigan as a school teacher. Interviewed in 2007, Coleman expressed no regrets at passing on the opportunity: "I haven't regretted anything I've done, including saying no to the Green Bay Packers. Giving up football gave me a chance to get started working with communities. I hope I've been a Jackie Robinson on a smaller scale. I always wanted to set an example and do the right thing. And nothing feels better than when someone says, 'I always wanted to be a Don Coleman.'"

== Teacher ==
Following his retirement from football, Coleman became a teacher at Flint Central High School. He was the first African-American teacher at Flint Central, and eventually became the position of dean of students at the school.

== Michigan State coach and administrator ==
In April 1968, Coleman left his position as a school principal in Flint to join Duffy Daugherty's coaching staff as an assistant coach. He was the first African-American on Michigan State's coaching staff. That same month, a group of African-American athletes at Michigan State had announced plans to boycott all sports at the university in protest against the lack of African-Americans in coaching, counseling and administration positions. According to a report in the Washington Afro-American, Michigan State was forced to leave its "lily-white hiring" by the "quiet but firm demands of a militant, forward looking student organization. Coleman resigned his coaching position at Michigan State in January 1969 and accepted a new position in the school's residence hall program. At the time of his resignation, Coleman said, "Frankly, I found football coaching was not for me ... During the years I had been out of football, the game had changed so drastically that I feel lost." After his resignation from the coaching staff, Coleman held ten different assignments at Michigan State, including assistant dean of the graduate school, counselor and director of minority comprehensive support programs at the Michigan State College of Osteopathic Medicine, and professor emeritus.

== Health and family ==
In November 1992, Coleman underwent quadruple bypass surgery. While recovering from the surgery, Coleman suffered a heart attack on Christmas Day 1992. After the heart attack, Coleman worked to maintain his cardiovascular health. Eighteen years after suffering the heart attack, Coleman, at age 81, told an interviewer, "Since then, my cardiovascular experience has gone well."

Coleman had been married to his wife, Geraldine, for more than 50 years. They had a daughter, Stephanie. Coleman died on January 30, 2017, at age 88.

== Honors and awards ==
Coleman was the first Michigan State football player to have his number retired. On December 14, 1951, Biggie Munn announced that Coleman's No. 78 would never again be used on a Spartan uniform. An executive from General Motors presented Coleman with a check for $500 on behalf of the people of Flint, Michigan.

Coleman has also received numerous other honors and awards, including the following:

- Coleman was one of the charter members of the Flint Hall of Fame.
- In January 1970, Coleman was named to the All-Time Michigan State football team based on ballots collected by the Michigan State Alumni Magazine and Michigan State News. He was also named as the best all-time interior lineman in Michigan State history.
- In January 1971, Coleman was named to the all-time Hula Bowl team and was named as the outstanding college lineman in the 25-year history of the Hula Bowl.
- In February 1975, Coleman was inducted into the College Football Hall of Fame. At the time of his induction, Coleman was working as a counselor and director of minority comprehensive support programs in the MSU College of Osteopathic Medicine. On learning of the honor, Coleman said, "This is the greatest honor I've ever received."
- In 1992, Coleman was a charter inductee into the Michigan State Hall of Fame.
- In December 1996, Coleman was selected by the Michigan Hall of Fame as the recipient of its second annual Legends Award.
