= 1951 Marquette Hilltoppers football team =

American college football season

1951 Marquette Hilltoppers football
- Conference: Independent
- Record: 4–6–1
- Head coach: Lisle Blackbourn (2nd season)
- Home stadium: Marquette Stadium

1951 Midwestern college football independents records
	Conf.			Overall
Team	W	L	T	W		L		T
No. 2 Michigan State		–		9	–	0	–	0
Xavier		–		9	–	0	–	1
Wabash		–		7	–	0	–	1
No. 13 Notre Dame		–		7	–	2	–	1
Dayton		–		7	–	3	–	0
Michigan Tech		–		4	–	2	–	1
Toledo		–		6	–	4	–	0
Washington University		–		5	–	4	–	0
Wayne		–		5	–	4	–	0
Bowling Green		–		4	–	4	–	1
Marquette		–		4	–	6	–	1
Baldwin–Wallace		–		3	–	5	–	0
John Carroll		–		3	–	6	–	0
Rose Poly		–		2	–	5	–	0
Youngstown		–		2	–	6	–	1
Rankings from AP Poll

The 1951 Marquette Hilltoppers football team was an American football team that represented Marquette University as an independent during the 1951 college football season. In its second season under head coach Lisle Blackbourn, the team compiled a 4–6–1 record and outscored opponents by a total of 223 to 213. The team was ranked at No. 53 in the 1951 Litkenhous Ratings.

The team played its home games at Marquette Stadium in Milwaukee.

== Schedule ==
Date	Opponent	Site	Result	Attendance	Source
September 22	South Dakota	Marquette Stadium; Milwaukee, WI	W 48–6	8,000	
September 29	at No. 15 Wisconsin	Camp Randall Stadium; Madison, WI	L 6–22	45,450	
October 6	Iowa State	Marquette Stadium; Milwaukee, WI	T 6–6	4,748	
October 13	at No. 1 Michigan State	Macklin Stadium; East Lansing, MI	L 14–20	39,251	
October 20	at Tulsa	Skelly Stadium; Tulsa, OK	L 21–27	17,500	
October 27	at Miami (OH)	Miami Field; Oxford, OH	W 27–7		
November 2	Pacific (CA)	Marquette Stadium; Milwaukee, WI	L 27–39		
November 10	at Holy Cross	Fitton Field; Worcester, MA	L 13–39	18,000	
November 17	Detroit	Marquette Stadium; Milwaukee, WI	W 26–13	17,391	
November 25	vs. Santa Clara	Charles C. Hughes Stadium; Sacramento, CA	L 14–27	10,000	
December 1	at San Jose State	Spartan Stadium; San Jose, CA	W 21–7		
Rankings from AP Poll released prior to the game
