= 1951 Xavier Musketeers football team =

American college football season

1951 Xavier Musketeers football
- Conference: Independent
- Record: 9–0–1
- Head coach: Ed Kluska (5th season)
- Home stadium: Xavier Stadium

1951 Midwestern college football independents records
	Conf.			Overall
Team	W	L	T	W		L		T
No. 2 Michigan State		–		9	–	0	–	0
Xavier		–		9	–	0	–	1
Wabash		–		7	–	0	–	1
No. 13 Notre Dame		–		7	–	2	–	1
Dayton		–		7	–	3	–	0
Michigan Tech		–		4	–	2	–	1
Toledo		–		6	–	4	–	0
Washington University		–		5	–	4	–	0
Wayne		–		5	–	4	–	0
Bowling Green		–		4	–	4	–	1
Marquette		–		4	–	6	–	1
Baldwin–Wallace		–		3	–	5	–	0
John Carroll		–		3	–	6	–	0
Rose Poly		–		2	–	5	–	0
Youngstown		–		2	–	6	–	1
Rankings from AP Poll

The 1951 Xavier Musketeers football team was an American football team that represented Xavier University as an independent during the 1951 college football season. In its fifth season under head coach Ed Kluska, the team compiled a 9–0–1 record and outscored opponents by a total of 305 to 46. The team was ranked at No. 24 in the 1951 Litkenhous Ratings.

The team played its home games at Xavier Stadium in Cincinnati.

== Schedule ==
Date	Opponent	Site	Result	Attendance	Source
September 16	Quantico Marines	Xavier Stadium; Cincinnati, OH	W 12–7	13,500	
September 23	at St. Bonaventure	Forness Stadium; Olean, NY	W 40–6	9,500	
September 29	at Camp Lejeune	Jacksonville, NC	T 7–7		
October 6	at Miami (OH)	Miami Field; Oxford, OH	W 32–14	13,000	
October 13	Youngstown	Xavier Stadium; Cincinnati, OH	W 48–0		
October 19	at Louisville	duPont Manual Stadium; Louisville, KY	W 47–6	6,000	
October 28	Dayton	Xavier Stadium; Cincinnati, OH	W 20–0	17,261	
November 10	John Carroll	Xavier Stadium; Cincinnati, OH	W 41–0		
November 17	at Cincinnati	Nippert Stadium; Cincinnati, OH	W 26–0	> 30,000	
November 22	Toledo	Xavier Stadium; Cincinnati, OH	W 32–6	6,500	
