= 1951 Western Michigan Broncos football team =

American college football season

1951 Western Michigan Broncos football
- Conference: Mid-American Conference
- Record: 4–4 (0–4 MAC)
- Head coach: John Gill (10th season)
- MVP: Ron Gow
- Captain: Bill Pitkin
- Home stadium: Waldo Stadium

1951 Mid-American Conference football standings
	Conf.					Overall
Team	W		L		T	W		L		T
Cincinnati $	3	–	0	–	0	10	–	1	–	0
Miami (OH)	3	–	1	–	0	7	–	3	–	0
Kent State	2	–	1	–	0	4	–	3	–	2
Ohio	2	–	2	–	0	5	–	4	–	1
Western Reserve	1	–	3	–	0	2	–	6	–	1
Western Michigan	0	–	4	–	0	4	–	4	–	0
$ – Conference champion

The 1951 Western Michigan Broncos football team represented Michigan College of Education (later renamed Western Michigan University) in the Mid-American Conference (MAC) during the 1951 college football season. In their 10th season under head coach John Gill, the Broncos compiled a 4–4 record (0–4 against MAC opponents), finished in sixth place in the MAC, and outscored their opponents, 164 to 160. The team played its home games at Waldo Stadium in Kalamazoo, Michigan.

Tackle Bill Pitkin was the team captain. Offensive guard Ron Gow received the team's most outstanding player award.

== Schedule ==
Date	Opponent	Site	Result	Attendance	Source
September 22	Kent State	Waldo Stadium; Kalamazoo, MI	L 19–49		
September 29	at Toledo*	Glass Bowl; Toledo, OH	W 14–6		
October 6	Ohio	Waldo Stadium; Kalamazoo, MI	L 0–13	1,500	
October 13	Miami (OH)	Waldo Stadium; Kalamazoo, MI	L 27–34	5,000	
October 20	Washington University*	Waldo Stadium; Kalamazoo, MI	W 12–7	8,000	
November 3	at Butler*	Fairview Bowl; Indianapolis, IN	W 20–0		
November 10	at Western Reserve	Clarke Field; Cleveland, OH	L 26–27	4,100	
November 17	at Central Michigan*	Waldo Stadium; Kalamazoo, MI (rivalry)	W 46–25		
*Non-conference game
