= 1951 Kent State Golden Flashes football team =

American college football season

1951 Kent State Golden Flashes football
- Conference: Mid-American Conference
- Record: 4–3–2 (2–1 MAC)
- Head coach: Trevor J. Rees (6th season)
- Home stadium: Memorial Stadium

1951 Mid-American Conference football standings
	Conf.					Overall
Team	W		L		T	W		L		T
Cincinnati $	3	–	0	–	0	10	–	1	–	0
Miami (OH)	3	–	1	–	0	7	–	3	–	0
Kent State	2	–	1	–	0	4	–	3	–	2
Ohio	2	–	2	–	0	5	–	4	–	1
Western Reserve	1	–	3	–	0	2	–	6	–	1
Western Michigan	0	–	4	–	0	4	–	4	–	0
$ – Conference champion

The 1951 Kent State Golden Flashes football team was an American football team that represented Kent State University in the Mid-American Conference (MAC) during the 1951 college football season. In their sixth season under head coach Trevor J. Rees, the Golden Flashes compiled a 4–3–2 record (2–1 against MAC opponents), finished in third place in the MAC, and outscored all opponents by a combined total of 241 to 162.

The team averaged 292.8 rushing yards per game, which remains one of the highest totals in Kent State football history.

The team's statistical leaders included Jack Mancos with 778 rushing yards, Nick Dellerba with 991 yards of total offense, and Bob Scott with 154 receiving yards. Three Kent State players received first-team honors on the All-Mid-American Conference football team: halfback Jack Mancos, defensive tackle Dick Raidel, and defensive guard Williard Divincenzo.

== Schedule ==
Date	Opponent	Site	Result	Attendance	Source
September 22	at Western Michigan	Waldo Stadium; Kalamazoo, MI	W 48–19		
September 28	Mount Union*	Memorial Stadium; Kent, OH	W 28–27		
October 6	at Western Reserve	Clarke Field; Cleveland, OH	W 42–20		
October 13	Bucknell*	Memorial Stadium; Kent, OH	L 7–13		
October 20	Morris Harvey*	Memorial Stadium; Kent, OH	T 14–14		
October 27	at Ohio	Peden Stadium; Athens, OH	L 27–28	12,000	
November 3	at Bowling Green*	Bowling Green, OH (rivalry)	T 27–27	5,200	
November 10	Akron*^{†}	Memorial Stadium; Kent, OH (Wagon Wheel)	W 48–7	8,000	
November 17	New Hampshire*	Memorial Stadium; Kent, OH	L 0–7	1,000	
*Non-conference game; ^{†}Homecoming
