= 1951 Miami Redskins football team =

American college football season

1951 Miami Redskins football
- Conference: Mid-American Conference
- Record: 7–3 (3–1 MAC)
- Head coach: Ara Parseghian (1st season)
- Captain: Donald Green
- Home stadium: Miami Field

1951 Mid-American Conference football standings
	Conf.					Overall
Team	W		L		T	W		L		T
Cincinnati $	3	–	0	–	0	10	–	1	–	0
Miami (OH)	3	–	1	–	0	7	–	3	–	0
Kent State	2	–	1	–	0	4	–	3	–	2
Ohio	2	–	2	–	0	5	–	4	–	1
Western Reserve	1	–	3	–	0	2	–	6	–	1
Western Michigan	0	–	4	–	0	4	–	4	–	0
$ – Conference champion

The 1951 Miami Redskins football team was an American football team that represented Miami University in the Mid-American Conference (MAC) during the 1951 college football season. In its first season under head coach Ara Parseghian, Miami compiled a 7–3 record (3–1 against MAC opponents), finished in second place in the MAC, and outscored all opponents by a combined total of 229 to 159. The Redskins were ranked at No. 83 in the 1951 Litkenhous Ratings.

Donald Green was the team captain. The team's statistical leaders included John Pont with 883 rushing yards, Jim Root with 894 passing yards, and Clive Rush with 398 receiving yards.

== Schedule ==
Date	Opponent	Site	Result	Source
September 22	at Wichita*	Veterans Field; Wichita, KS	W 21–13	
September 29	Bowling Green*	Miami Field; Oxford, OH	W 46–7	
October 6	Xavier*	Miami Field; Oxford, OH	L 14–32	
October 13	at Western Michigan	Waldo Stadium; Kalamazoo, MI	W 34–27	
October 20	Ohio	Miami Field; Oxford, OH (rivalry)	W 7–0	
October 27	Marquette*	Miami Field; Oxford, OH	L 7–27	
November 3	Buffalo*	Miami Field; Oxford, OH	W 27–7	
November 10	at Dayton*	UD Stadium; Dayton, OH	W 21–20	
November 17	Western Reserve	Miami Field; Oxford, OH	W 34–7	
November 24	at Cincinnati	Nippert Stadium; Cincinnati, OH (rivalry)	L 14–19	
*Non-conference game
