= 1951 Iowa State Cyclones football team =

American college football season

1951 Iowa State Cyclones football
- Conference: Big Seven Conference
- Record: 4–4–1 (2–4 Big 7)
- Head coach: Abe Stuber (5th season)
- Captain: Stan Campbell
- Home stadium: Clyde Williams Field

1951 Big Seven Conference football standings
	Conf.					Overall
Team	W		L		T	W		L		T
No. 10 Oklahoma $	6	–	0	–	0	8	–	2	–	0
Colorado	5	–	1	–	0	7	–	3	–	0
Kansas	4	–	2	–	0	8	–	2	–	0
Iowa State	2	–	4	–	0	4	–	4	–	1
Nebraska	2	–	4	–	0	2	–	8	–	0
Missouri	2	–	4	–	0	3	–	7	–	0
Kansas State	0	–	6	–	0	0	–	9	–	0
$ – Conference champion; Rankings from AP Poll

The 1951 Iowa State Cyclones football team represented Iowa State College of Agricultural and Mechanic Arts (later renamed Iowa State University) in the Big Seven Conference during the 1951 college football season. In their fifth year under head coach Abe Stuber, the Cyclones compiled a 4–4–1 record (2–4 against conference opponents), tied for fourth place in the conference, and were outscored by their opponents by a combined total of 216 to 211. The team was ranked at No. 74 in the 1951 Litkenhous Ratings.

The team's regular starting lineup on offense consisted of left end Mal Schmidt, left tackle Jack Lessin, left guard Stan Campbell, center Rollie Arns, right guard Carl Brettschneider, right tackle Bob Mateson, right end Bob Voetberg, quarterback Dick Mann, left halfback Dick Cherpinsky, right halfback Frank Congiardo, and fullback Maury Schnell. Stan Campbell was the team captain.

The team's statistical leaders included Frank Congiardo with 315 rushing yards, Rich Mann with 1,296 passing yards, Mal Schmidt with 547 receiving yards, and Stan Cozzi with 36 points (six touchdowns) each. Three Iowa State players were selected as first-team all-conference players: Stan Campbell, Rich Mann, and Mal Schmidt.

The team played its home games at Clyde Williams Field in Ames, Iowa.

== Schedule ==
Date	Time	Opponent	Site	TV	Result	Attendance	Source
September 22	2:00 pm	Wayne*	Clyde Williams Field; Ames, IA		W 53–21	9,145–10,000	
September 29	2:00 pm	at Kansas	Memorial Stadium; Lawrence, KS		L 33–53	25,000–26,000	
October 6	8:00 pm	at Marquette*	Marquette Stadium; Milwaukee, WI		T 6–6	4,748	
October 13	2:00 pm	Kansas State^{†}	Clyde Williams Field; Ames, IA (rivalry)		W 32–6	15,789	
October 20	2:00 pm	Missouri	Clyde Williams Field; Ames, IA (rivalry)	WOI	W 21–14	9,264	
October 27	1:30 pm	at Drake*	Drake Stadium; Des Moines, IA		W 13–0	15,627	
November 3	3:00 pm	at Colorado	Folsom Field; Boulder, CO		L 20–47	23,462	
November 10	2:00 pm	Nebraska	Clyde Williams Field; Ames, IA (rivalry)		L 27–34	15,519	
November 17	2:00 pm	at No. 12 Oklahoma	Oklahoma Memorial Stadium; Norman, OK		L 6–35	34,761	
*Non-conference game; ^{†}Homecoming; Rankings from AP Poll released prior to the game; All times are in Central time
