= 1951 Kansas Jayhawks football team =

American college football season

1951 Kansas Jayhawks football
- Conference: Big Seven Conference

Ranking
- Coaches: No. 20
- Record: 8–2 (4–2 Big 7)
- Head coach: Jules V. Sikes (4th season)
- Captains: Aubrey Linville; Bill Schaake
- Home stadium: Memorial Stadium

1951 Big Seven Conference football standings
	Conf.					Overall
Team	W		L		T	W		L		T
No. 10 Oklahoma $	6	–	0	–	0	8	–	2	–	0
Colorado	5	–	1	–	0	7	–	3	–	0
Kansas	4	–	2	–	0	8	–	2	–	0
Iowa State	2	–	4	–	0	4	–	4	–	1
Nebraska	2	–	4	–	0	2	–	8	–	0
Missouri	2	–	4	–	0	3	–	7	–	0
Kansas State	0	–	6	–	0	0	–	9	–	0
$ – Conference champion; Rankings from AP Poll

The 1951 Kansas Jayhawks football team represented the University of Kansas in the Big Seven Conference during the 1951 college football season. In their fourth season under head coach Jules V. Sikes, the Jayhawks compiled an 8–2 record (4–2 against conference opponents), finished third in the Big Seven Conference, and outscored all opponents by a combined total of 316 to 208. The team was ranked at No. 38 in the 1951 Litkenhous Ratings.

The team's statistical leaders included Bob Brandeberry with 649 rushing yards, Bud Laughlin with 78 points scored, and Jerry Robertson with 925 passing yards. Aubrey Linville and Bill Schaake were the team captains.

They played their home games at Memorial Stadium in Lawrence, Kansas.

== Schedule ==
Date	Opponent	Rank	Site	Result	Attendance	Source
September 22	at TCU*		Amon G. Carter Stadium; Fort Worth, TX	W 27–13	28,000	
September 29	Iowa State		Memorial Stadium; Lawrence, KS	W 53–33	25,000–26,000	
October 6	at Colorado	No. 20	Folsom Field; Boulder, CO	L 27–35	29,367	
October 13	Utah*		Memorial Stadium; Lawrence, KS	W 26–7	20,000	
October 20	at No. 19 Oklahoma		Oklahoma Memorial Stadium; Norman, OK	L 21–33	44,462	
October 27	Kansas State		Memorial Stadium; Lawrence, KS (rivalry)	W 33–14	20,000	
November 3	at Nebraska		Memorial Stadium; Lincoln, NE (rivalry)	W 27–7	34,000–34,500	
November 10	Loyola (CA)*		Memorial Stadium; Lawrence, KS	W 34–26	18,000	
November 17	at Oklahoma A&M*		Lewis Field; Stillwater, OK	W 27–12	17,000	
December 1	Missouri^{†}		Memorial Stadium; Lawrence, KS (Border War)	W 41–28	35,000	
*Non-conference game; ^{†}Homecoming; Rankings from AP Poll released prior to the game

== Game summaries ==
Iowa State

Team	1	2	3	4	Total
Iowa State	12	14	0	7	33
• #9 Kansas	7	14	13	19	53

- Date: September 29
- Location: Memorial Stadium
  Lawrence, KS
- Game attendance: 25,000

Thanks to powerful running attack, the Iowa State Cyclone where able to take a 26-7 lead midway into second quarter. A long touchdown at the end of the half, kept Kansas in the game, trailing 26-21. Kansas defense stiffened up in the second half and only allowed a single touch down while the offense scored 32 points. This was the highest scoring game in the series up to that point.
