= 1951 Akron Zips football team =

American college football season

1951 Akron Zips football
- Conference: Ohio Athletic Conference
- Record: 1–8 (1–3 OAC)
- Head coach: William Houghton (4th season)
- Captains: Joe Mazzaferro; Paul Scarpitti
- Home stadium: Rubber Bowl

1951 Ohio Athletic Conference football standings
	Conf.					Overall
Team	W		L		T	W		L		T
Ohio Wesleyan $	6	–	0	–	0	8	–	1	–	0
Heidelberg	3	–	0	–	1	7	–	1	–	1
Mount Union	2	–	1	–	0	3	–	4	–	1
Muskingum	3	–	2	–	1	5	–	2	–	1
Denison	3	–	2	–	1	4	–	3	–	1
Oberlin	2	–	2	–	0	4	–	4	–	0
Otterbein	2	–	2	–	1	2	–	4	–	2
Wooster	2	–	3	–	0	6	–	3	–	0
Akron	1	–	3	–	0	1	–	8	–	0
Wittenberg	1	–	5	–	0	4	–	6	–	0
Capital	0	–	2	–	1	2	–	4	–	1
Marietta	0	–	3	–	1	2	–	4	–	1
$ – Conference champion

The 1951 Akron Zips football team was an American football team that represented the University of Akron in the Ohio Athletic Conference (OAC) during the 1951 college football season. In its fourth and final season under head coach William Houghton, the team compiled a 1–8 record (1–3 against OAC opponents) and was outscored by a total of 252 to 116. Joe Mazzaferro and Paul Scarpitti were the team captains. The team played its home games at the Rubber Bowl in Akron, Ohio.

== Schedule ==
Date	Opponent	Site	Result	Attendance	Source
September 22	Case Tech*	Rubber Bowl; Akron, OH	L 14–21	3,000	
September 29	at Ohio*	Peden Stadium; Athens, OH	L 7–40		
October 6	Baldwin–Wallace*	Rubber Bowl; Akron, OH	L 16–20		
October 13	Carnegie Tech*	Rubber Bowl; Akron, OH	L 32–42		
October 20	Mount Union	Rubber Bowl; Akron, OH	L 7–46		
October 27	at Wooster	Wooster, OH	L 6–7	800	
November 10	at Kent State*	Memorial Stadium; Kent, OH (Wagon Wheel)	L 7–48		
November 16	at Heidelberg	Tiffin, OH	L 13–21		
November 22	at Wittenberg	Springfield, OH	W 13–7		
*Non-conference game
