= 1951 Dayton Flyers football team =

American college football season

1951 Dayton Flyers football

Salad Bowl, L 21–26 vs. Houston
- Conference: Independent
- Record: 7–3
- Head coach: Joe Gavin (5th season)
- Captain: Lou Cannaroni
- Home stadium: University of Dayton Stadium

1951 Midwestern college football independents records
	Conf.			Overall
Team	W	L	T	W		L		T
No. 2 Michigan State		–		9	–	0	–	0
Xavier		–		9	–	0	–	1
Wabash		–		7	–	0	–	1
No. 13 Notre Dame		–		7	–	2	–	1
Dayton		–		7	–	3	–	0
Michigan Tech		–		4	–	2	–	1
Toledo		–		6	–	4	–	0
Washington University		–		5	–	4	–	0
Wayne		–		5	–	4	–	0
Bowling Green		–		4	–	4	–	1
Marquette		–		4	–	6	–	1
Baldwin–Wallace		–		3	–	5	–	0
John Carroll		–		3	–	6	–	0
Rose Poly		–		2	–	5	–	0
Youngstown		–		2	–	6	–	1
Rankings from AP Poll

The 1951 Dayton Flyers football team was an American football team that represented the University of Dayton as an independent during the 1951 college football season. In their fifth season under head coach Joe Gavin, the Flyers compiled a 7–3 record and lost to Houston in the 1952 Salad Bowl. The team was ranked at No. 71 in the 1951 Litkenhous Ratings.

== Schedule ==
Date	Opponent	Site	Result	Attendance	Source
September 22	Quantico Marines	UD Stadium; Dayton, OH	W 21–14		
September 30	St. Bonaventure	UD Stadium; Dayton, OH	W 35–14		
October 5	at Youngstown	Rayen Stadium; Youngstown, OH	W 27–7		
October 13	Toledo	UD Stadium; Dayton, OH	W 47–7		
October 20	Chattanooga	UD Stadium; Dayton, OH	W 21–6		
October 28	at Xavier	Xavier Stadium; Cincinnati, OH	L 0–20	17,261	
November 4	at John Carroll	Cleveland, OH	W 36–0		
November 10	Miami (OH)	UD Stadium; Dayton, OH	L 20–21		
November 17	at Marshall	Fairfield Stadium; Huntington, WV	W 34–13		
January 1, 1952	vs. Houston	Montgomery Stadium; Phoenix, AZ (Salad Bowl)	L 21–26	17,000	
