= 1951 Bowling Green Falcons football team =

American college football season

1951 Bowling Green Falcons football
- Conference: Independent
- Record: 4–4–1
- Head coach: Robert Whittaker (11th season)
- MVP: Fred Durig
- Captains: Ollie Glass; Eugene Aldridge
- Home stadium: University Stadium

1951 Midwestern college football independents records
	Conf.			Overall
Team	W	L	T	W		L		T
No. 2 Michigan State		–		9	–	0	–	0
Xavier		–		9	–	0	–	1
Wabash		–		7	–	0	–	1
No. 13 Notre Dame		–		7	–	2	–	1
Dayton		–		7	–	3	–	0
Michigan Tech		–		4	–	2	–	1
Toledo		–		6	–	4	–	0
Washington University		–		5	–	4	–	0
Wayne		–		5	–	4	–	0
Bowling Green		–		4	–	4	–	1
Marquette		–		4	–	6	–	1
Baldwin–Wallace		–		3	–	5	–	0
John Carroll		–		3	–	6	–	0
Rose Poly		–		2	–	5	–	0
Youngstown		–		2	–	6	–	1
Rankings from AP Poll

The 1951 Bowling Green Falcons football team was an American football team that represented Bowling Green State University as an independent during the 1951 college football season. In their 11th season under head coach Robert Whittaker, the Falcons compiled a 4–4–1 record and were outscored by all opponents by a combined total of 178 to 150.

The team's statistical leaders were Rex Simonds with 506 passing yards, fullback Fred Durig with 1,444 rushing yards, and Jim Ladd with 236 receiving yards. Durig's 1,444 rushing yards stood as a Bowling Green single season record until 1974. Ollie Glass and Eugene Aldridge were the team captains. Durig received the team's Most Valuable Player award.

== Schedule ==
Date	Opponent	Site	Result	Attendance	Source
September 22	Ohio Wesleyan	University Stadium; Bowling Green, OH	W 23–13		
September 29	at Miami (OH)	Miami Field; Oxford, OH	L 7–46		
October 6	Mount Union	University Stadium; Bowling Green, OH	L 13–26		
October 13	at Ohio	Peden Stadium; Athens, OH	L 7–28		
October 20	at Baldwin–Wallace	Berea, OH	W 27–20		
October 27	Toledo	University Stadium; Bowling Green, OH (rivalry)	L 6–12		
November 3	Kent State^{†}	University Stadium; Bowling Green, OH (rivalry)	T 27–27	5,200	
November 10	at Youngstown	Rayen Stadium; Youngstown, OH	W 20–0		
November 17	at Bradley	Peoria Stadium; Peoria, IL	W 20–6		
^{†}Homecoming
