= Chet Ostrowski =

American football player (1930–2001)

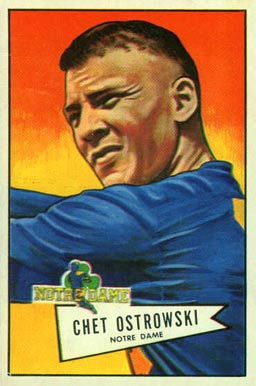
- Ostrowski on a 1952 Bowman football card

No. 88
- Position: Defensive end

Personal information
- Born: April 8, 1930; Chicago, Illinois, U.S.
- Died: October 10, 2001 (aged 71); Orland Park, Illinois, U.S.
- Listed height: 6 ft 1 in (1.85 m)
- Listed weight: 232 lb (105 kg)

Career information
- High school: Weber (Chicago)
- College: Notre Dame
- NFL draft: 1952: 10th round, 115th overall pick

Career history
- Washington Redskins (1954–1959)

Awards and highlights
- National champion (1949)

Career NFL statistics
- Interceptions: 2
- Fumble recoveries: 4
- Stats at Pro Football Reference

Chester Casmir Ostrowski (April 8, 1930 – October 10, 2001) was an American professional football defensive end in the National Football League (NFL) for the Washington Redskins. He played college football at the University of Notre Dame, where he received BA in history, and was selected in the tenth round of the 1952 NFL draft with the 115th overall pick.
