= Bill Schaake =

American football coach (1930–2017)

Biographical details
- Born: July 30, 1930; Perry, Kansas, U.S.
- Died: September 8, 2017 (aged 87); Ellensburg, Washington, U.S.

Playing career

Football
- 1949–1951: Kansas

Basketball
- 1950–1951: Kansas
- Position: End (football)

Coaching career (HC unless noted)

Football
- 1954–1956: Abilene HS (KS)
- 1957: Shawnee Mission North HS (KS)
- 1958: Shawnee Mission East HS (KS)
- 1959: Wichita (OL)
- 1960–1964: Goodland HS (KS)
- 1965: Minot State
- 1966: Kansas (assistant)
- 1967–1968: Washburn
- 1972: Syracuse HS (KS)
- 1973–1975: Evergreen HS (CO)

Head coaching record
- Overall: 7–18–1 (college)

Accomplishments and honors

Awards
- First-team All-Big Seven (1951)

William Schaake (July 30, 1930 – September 8, 2017) was an American football coach active at the high school and college levels between 1954 and 1975. He served as the head football coach at Minot State Teachers College—now known as Minot State University—in 1965 and at Washburn University from 1967 to 1968, compiling a career college football head coaching record of 7–18–1.

== Early life and playing career ==
Schaake attended Lawrence High School in Lawrence, Kansas, where the played on state championship teams in football and basketball. He then moved on the University of Kansas, where he lettered in football and basketball, and was the captain of the 1951 Kansas Jayhawks football team.

== Coaching career ==
After serving in the United States Air Force, Schaake began his coaching career in 1954 when he was hired as head football coach at Abilene High School in Abilene, Kansas. In 1957, he was appointed head football coach Shawnee Mission North High School in Overland Park, Kansas. The next year, took on the same position at Shawnee Mission East High School in Prairie Village, Kansas, leading his team to a record of 5–3–1 in the fall of 1958. The following spring, he was hired as offensive line coach at the University of Wichita—now known as Wichita State University—under head football coach Woody Woodard.

== Later life and death ==
Schaake and his wife, Darlene, retired to Ellensburg, Washington. He died there, on September 8, 2017.

== Head coaching record ==
=== College ===
| Year | Team | Overall | Conference | Standing | Bowl/playoffs |
|---|---|---|---|---|---|
Minot State Beavers (North Dakota College Athletic Conference) (1965)
| 1965 | Minot State | 5–2–1 | 4–2 | 3rd | |
| Minot State: | | 5–2–1 | 4–2 | | |
Washburn Ichabods (Central Intercollegiate Conference) (1967–1968)
| 1967 | Washburn | 0–9 | 0–4 | 5th | |
| 1968 | Washburn | 2–7 | 1–3 | 4th | |
| Washburn: | | 2–16 | 1–7 | | |
| Total: | | 7–18–1 | | | |
