= Johnny Bright incident =

1951 on-field assault during an American college football game

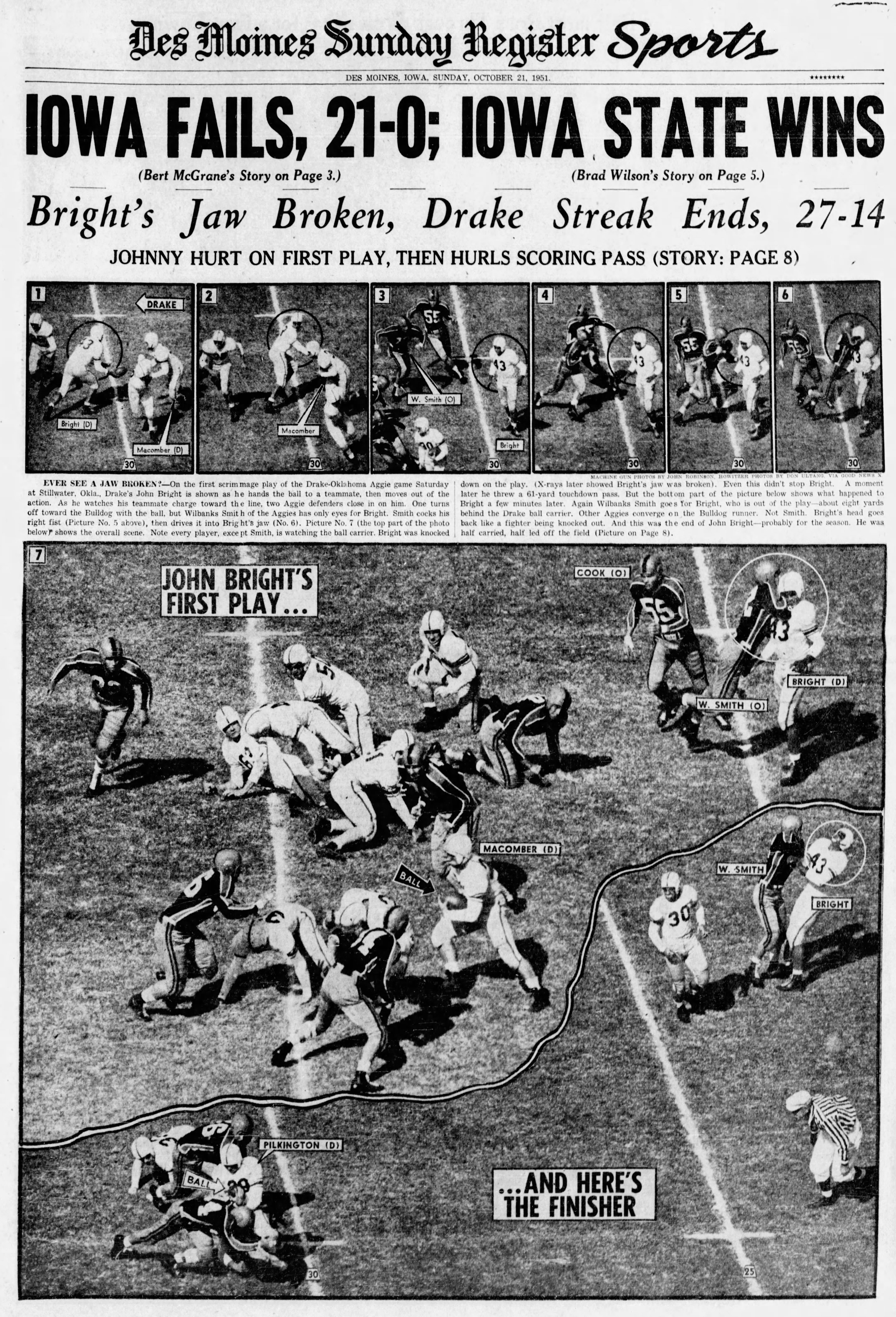
Johnny Bright Incident – October 21, 1951 Des Moines Register newspaper page showing Robinson and Ultang photo sequence

The Johnny Bright incident was a violent on-field assault against African-American player Johnny Bright by Wilbanks Smith, a white opposing player during an American college football game held on October 20, 1951, in Stillwater, Oklahoma. The game was significant in itself as it marked the first time that an African-American athlete with a national profile and of critical importance to the success of his team, the Drake Bulldogs, had played against Oklahoma A&M College (now Oklahoma State University) at Oklahoma A&M's Lewis Field. Bright's injury also highlighted the racial tensions of the times and assumed notoriety when it was captured in what was later to become both a widely disseminated and eventually Pulitzer Prize–winning photo sequence.

== Assault ==
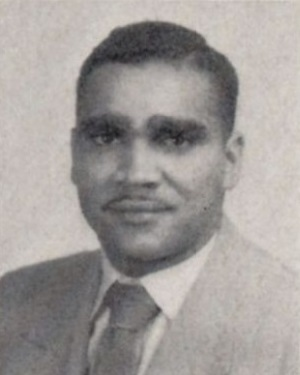
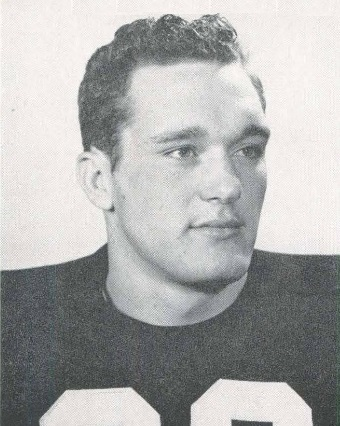
The players involved in the incident, Drake quarterback Johnny Bright (left) and Oklahoma A&M guard Wilbanks Smith (right)

Bright's participation as a halfback and quarterback in the game between the Drake Bulldogs and Oklahoma A&M Cowboys on October 20, 1951, at Lewis Field was controversial even before it began. Bright had been the first African-American football player to play at Lewis Field two years prior without incident. In 1951, Bright was a pre-season Heisman Trophy candidate and led the nation in total offense. Bright had never played for a losing team in his college career. Coming into the contest, Drake carried a five-game winning streak, owing much to Bright's rushing and passing abilities.

It was an open secret that Oklahoma A&M players were targeting Bright. Both Oklahoma A&M's student newspaper, The Daily O'Collegian, and the local newspaper, The News Press, reported that Bright was a marked man, and several A&M students were openly claiming that Bright "would not be around at the end of the game". Although Oklahoma A&M had integrated in 1949, the Jim Crow spirit was still very much alive on campus.

During the first seven minutes of the game, Bright was knocked unconscious three times by blows from Oklahoma A&M defensive tackle Wilbanks Smith. Bright later reported that Smith's first punch broke his jaw. Despite that, he was still able to complete a 61-yard touchdown pass to Drake halfback Jim Pilkington a few plays later. Soon afterward, the injury forced him to leave the game. Subsequent X-rays confirmed his jaw had been broken. Bright finished the game with less than 100 yards, the first time in his three-year collegiate career. Oklahoma A&M eventually won 27–14.

Bob Spiegel, a reporter with the Des Moines Tribune, interviewed several spectators after the game, eventually publishing a report on the incident in the October 30, 1951, issue of the newspaper. According to Spiegel's report, several of the Oklahoma A&M students he interviewed overheard an Oklahoma A&M coach repeatedly say "Get that nigger" whenever the A&M practice squad ran Drake plays against the Oklahoma A&M starting defense prior to the October 20 game. Spiegel also recounted the experiences of a businessman and his wife, who were seated behind a group of Oklahoma A&M practice squad players. At the beginning of the game, one of the players turned around and said, "We're gonna get that nigger." After the first blow to Bright was delivered by Smith, the same player again turned around and told the businessman, "See that knot on my jaw? That same guy gave me that the very same way in practice."

== Photographic sequence ==
A six-photograph sequence of the incident captured by Des Moines Register cameraman John Robinson clearly showed Smith's first, jaw-breaking blow was thrown well after Bright had handed the ball off to Drake fullback Gene Macomber and was well behind the play. Robinson and Don Ultang had set up cameras to focus on Bright before the game after the rumors of his targeting became too loud to ignore. They rushed the film to Des Moines as soon as Bright was knocked out of the game several plays later. Ultang said years later that they were very lucky that the incident took place when it did; they had only planned to stay through the first quarter so they could have enough time to develop the pictures before the newspaper's publication deadline. Robinson and Ultang's photographs won the 1952 Pulitzer Prize for Photography, and eventually made it into the November 5, 1951, issue of Life.

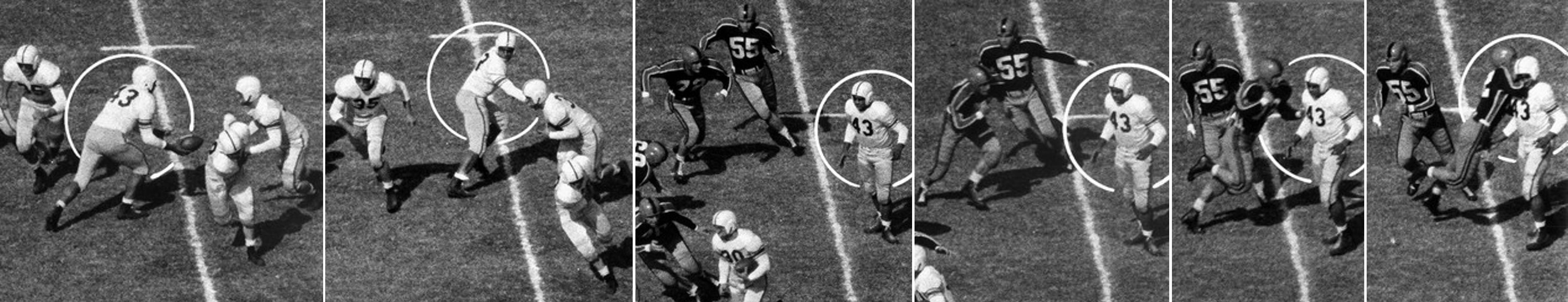
The Pulitzer Prize–winning sequence of photos showing the first hit on Johnny Bright by Wilbanks Smith

== Aftermath ==
Oklahoma A&M's president, Oliver Willham, denied anything happened even after evidence of the incident was published nationwide. This began a cover-up that would last over half a century; during that time, whenever the story was discussed, the standard response from A&M/OSU was "no comment". The determination to gloss over the affair was so strong that when Robert B. Kamm succeeded Willham in 1966, he knew that he could not even discuss the matter even though he had been Drake's dean of men at the time of the incident.

When it became apparent that neither Oklahoma A&M nor the Missouri Valley Conference (MVC), to which both Drake and Oklahoma A&M belonged, would take any disciplinary action against Smith, Drake withdrew from the MVC in protest. The Bulldogs did not return to the MVC until 1956 for non-football sports, and did not return for football until 1971. Fellow member Bradley University pulled out of the league in solidarity with Drake and did not return for non-football sports until 1955; its football team never played another down in the MVC. (Bradley dropped football in 1970.)

The incident eventually provoked changes in NCAA football rules regarding illegal blocking, and mandated the use of more protective helmets with face guards.

=== Johnny Bright ===
Bright's broken jaw limited his effectiveness for the remainder of his senior season at Drake, but he earned 70 percent of the yards the Bulldogs gained and scored 70 percent of the team's points, despite missing the better part of the final three games of the season. Bright finished fifth in the balloting for the 1951 Heisman Trophy, and played in the post-season East–West Shrine Game and the Hula Bowl.

Following his 1952 graduation from Drake, Bright went on to enjoy a 12-year professional football career in the Canadian Football League, retiring in 1964 as the CFL's all-time leading rusher, and was inducted into the Canadian Football Hall of Fame in 1970.

Recalling the incident without apparent bitterness in a 1980 Des Moines Register interview three years before his death, Bright commented: "There's no way it couldn't have been racially motivated." Bright went on to add: "What I like about the whole deal now, and what I'm smug enough to say, is that getting a broken jaw has somehow made college athletics better. It made the NCAA take a hard look and clean up some things that were bad."

When asked about Smith, whom he had not seen since the incident, Bright said he felt "null and void" about Smith, but added: "The thing has been a great influence on my life. My total philosophy of life now is that, whatever a person's bias and limitation, they deserve respect. Everyone's entitled to their own beliefs."

=== Wilbanks Smith ===
Wilbanks Smith received over 1,000 letters regarding the incident. Most of the mail was hate mail or death threats, but some were congratulatory and thankful. Smith maintained that he was not racist, the hit was "not a racial incident," and that he had landed "the same hit" on a white player earlier in the game. He never apologized for the incident, but said in 2012, that he was glad the incident had helped to integrate college football, saying "It took me a long time before I could smile about it. But now I can. I think it was a tool [Civil Rights'] organizations used, and it was very effective." Smith died on January 14, 2020, at the age of 89.

=== OSU apology ===
On September 28, 2005, Oklahoma State University President David J. Schmidly wrote a letter to Drake President David Maxwell formally apologizing for the incident. The apology came 22 years after Bright's death. Schmidly, reiterating a conversation earlier in the month over the phone, called the team's behavior that day "an ugly mark on Oklahoma State University and college football".

== See also ==
- History of African Americans in the Canadian Football League
- Jack Trice
