= Libero Bertagnolli =

American football player and coach (1914–1992)

Biographical details
- Born: November 13, 1914; Benld, Illinois, U.S.
- Died: September 14, 1992 (aged 77); Bloomington, Illinois, U.S.

Playing career
- 1935–1937: Washington University
- 1942: Chicago Cardinals
- c. 1943: Great Lakes Navy
- 1945: Chicago Cardinals
- Position: Guard

Coaching career (HC unless noted)
- 1951–1953: Illinois Wesleyan
- ?: Bloomington HS (IL)

Head coaching record
- Overall: 11–12–2 (college)

Accomplishments and honors

Championships
- 1 CCI (1951)

Libero Lorenz "Bert" Bertagnolli (November 13, 1914 – September 14, 1992) was an American football player and coach. He played college football at Washington University in St. Louis and professionally in the National Football League (NFL) with the Chicago Bears, in 1942 and 1945. Bertagnolli was the head football coach at Illinois Wesleyan University in Bloomington, Illinois from 1951 to 1953, compiling a record of 11–12–2. He served in the United States Navy during World War II. Bertagnolli later coached football, swimming, and tennis, at Bloomington High School in Bloomington, Illinois. He died on September 14, 1992, at BroMenn Regional Medical Center, in Bloomington, Illinois.

== Head coaching record ==
=== College ===
Year	Team	Overall	Conference	Standing	Bowl/playoffs
Illinois Wesleyan Titans (College Conference of Illinois) (1951–1953)
1951	Illinois Wesleyan	8–0	5–0	1st	
1952	Illinois Wesleyan	2–5–1	2–2	5th	
1952	Illinois Wesleyan	1–7–1	1–3–1	6th	
Illinois Wesleyan:		11–12–2	8–5–1		
Total:		11–12–2			
National championship Conference title Conference division title or championship game berth
