= List of Eastern Kentucky Colonels men's basketball head coaches =

The following is a list of Eastern Kentucky Colonels men's basketball head coaches. There have been 20 head coaches of the Colonels in their 111-season history.

Eastern Kentucky's current head coach is A. W. Hamilton. He was hired as the Colonels' head coach in March 2018, replacing Dan McHale, who was fired after the 2017–18 season.

No.	Tenure	Coach	Years	Record	Pct.
1	1909–1912	Clyde H. Wilson	3	10–11	.476
2	1912–1913	Charles A. Keith	1	9–3	.750
3	1913–1917	Ben Barnard	4	14–10	.583
4	1919–1920	Charles F. Miller and Clyde McCoy	1	3–4	.429
5	1920–1929	George Hembree	9	49–88	.358
6	1929–1935	Turkey Hughes	6	68–40	.630
7	1935–1946 (Note: Eastern Kentucky did not field a team for the 1943–44 season)	Rome Rankin	10	135–53	.718
8	1946–1962 (Note: McBrayer left Eastern Kentucky after eight games in the 1961–62 season. Baechtold replaced him on a permanent basis.)	Paul McBrayer	16	214–142	.601
9	1962–1967	Jim Baechtold	6	70–57	.551
10	1967–1973	Guy R. Strong	6	78–65	.545
11	1973–1976	Bob Mulcahy	3	25–48	.342
12	1976–1981	Ed Byhre	5	69–63	.523
13	1981–1989	Max Good	8	96–129	.427
14	1989–1992	Mike Pollio	3	51–41	.554
15	1992–1997	Mike Calhoun	5	58–77	.430
16	1997–2000	Scott Perry	3	19–61	.238
17	2000–2005	Travis Ford	5	61–80	.433
18	2005–2015	Jeff Neubauer	10	188–134	.584
19	2015–2018	Dan McHale	3	38–55	.409
20	2018–present	A. W. Hamilton	5	87–74	.540
Totals		20 coaches	111 seasons	1,342–1,235	.521
Records updated through end of 2022–23 season Source
