= 1951 Alabama Crimson Tide football team =

American college football season

1951 Alabama Crimson Tide football
- Conference: Southeastern Conference
- Record: 5–6 (3–5 SEC)
- Head coach: Harold Drew (5th season)
- Captain: Jack Brown
- Home stadium: Denny Stadium; Legion Field; Ladd Stadium; Cramton Bowl

1951 Southeastern Conference football standings
	Conf.					Overall
Team	W		L		T	W		L		T
No. 5 Georgia Tech +	7	–	0	–	0	11	–	0	–	1
No. 1 Tennessee +	5	–	0	–	0	10	–	1	–	0
LSU	4	–	2	–	1	7	–	3	–	1
Ole Miss	4	–	2	–	1	6	–	3	–	1
No. 15 Kentucky	3	–	3	–	0	8	–	4	–	0
Auburn	3	–	4	–	0	5	–	5	–	0
Vanderbilt	3	–	5	–	0	6	–	5	–	0
Alabama	3	–	5	–	0	5	–	6	–	0
Florida	2	–	4	–	0	5	–	5	–	0
Georgia	2	–	4	–	0	5	–	5	–	0
Mississippi State	2	–	5	–	0	4	–	5	–	0
Tulane	1	–	5	–	0	4	–	6	–	0
+ – Conference co-champions; Rankings from AP Poll

The 1951 Alabama Crimson Tide football team (variously "Alabama", "UA" or "Bama") represented the University of Alabama in the 1951 college football season. It was the Crimson Tide's 57th overall and 18th season as a member of the Southeastern Conference (SEC). The team was led by head coach Harold Drew, in his fifth year, and played their home games at Denny Stadium in Tuscaloosa, Legion Field in Birmingham, Ladd Stadium in Mobile and at the Cramton Bowl in Montgomery, Alabama. They finished with a record of five wins and six losses (5–6 overall, 3–5 in the SEC).

The Crimson Tide opened the season with an 89–0 victory over Delta State, and the 89 points were the most scored by an Alabama team since the 1922 squad defeated Marion Military Institute 110–0. However, the Tide followed the victory up with a four-game losing streak that included losses against LSU, Vanderbilt, Villanova and Tennessee. Alabama then evened its record at 4–4 with victories over Mississippi State, Georgia and Mississippi Southern, but then lost to Georgia Tech and Florida to secure their first losing season since 1903. The Crimson Tide then closed the season with a 25–7 victory over Auburn.

The game against Delta State at Cramton Bowl in Montgomery marked the first year of a four-year period in which Alabama, which was already regularly playing games in Mobile and Birmingham as well as Tuscaloosa, began playing "home" games in four different cities.

== Schedule ==
Date	Opponent	Rank	Site	TV	Result	Attendance
September 21	Delta State*	No. 9	Cramton Bowl; Montgomery, AL		W 89–0	9,000
September 29	LSU	No. 9	Ladd Stadium; Mobile, AL (rivalry)		L 7–13	32,169
October 6	at Vanderbilt		Dudley Field; Nashville, TN		L 20–22	25,000
October 12	Villanova*		Denny Stadium; Tuscaloosa, AL		L 18–41	15,000
October 20	No. 2 Tennessee		Legion Field; Birmingham, AL (Third Saturday in October)	ABC	L 13–27	44,000
October 27	at Mississippi State		Scott Field; Starkville, MS (rivalry)		W 7–0	20,000
November 3	at Georgia		Sanford Stadium; Athens, GA (rivalry)		W 16–14	32,000
November 10	Mississippi Southern*		Denny Stadium; Tuscaloosa, AL		W 40–7	13,000
November 17	No. 7 Georgia Tech		Legion Field; Birmingham, AL (rivalry)		L 7–27	35,000
November 24	Florida^{†}		Denny Stadium; Tuscaloosa, AL (rivalry)		L 21–30	23,000
December 1	vs. Auburn		Legion Field; Birmingham, AL (Iron Bowl)		W 25–7	42,000
*Non-conference game; ^{†}Homecoming; Rankings from AP Poll released prior to the game

== Game summaries ==
=== Delta State ===
Team	1	2	3	4	Total
Delta State	0	0	0	0	0
• #9 Alabama	21	14	28	26	89

- Date: September 21
- Location: Cramton Bowl
  Montgomery, AL
- Game attendance: 9,000

To open the 1951 season, Alabama shutout the Delta State Statesmen 89–0 at the Cramton Bowl in the only all-time meeting between the schools. The Crimson Tide scored multiple touchdowns in all four quarters in what was the largest margin of victory for Alabama since a 110–0 win over the Marion Military Institute to open the 1922 season. In the first quarter, touchdowns were scored on a 30-yard Bobby Marlow run, a 27-yard James Melton run and an 11-yard Clell Hobson pass to Joe Curtis for a 21–0 lead. In the second quarter, touchdowns were scored on a 36-yard Larry Chiodetti run and a three-yard Joe Compton run for a 35–0 halftime lead. In the third quarter, touchdowns were scored on a 51-yard Marlow run, a 15-yard George McCain pass to Chiodetti, a one-yard Bobby Luna run and a 46-yard Luna pass to Thomas Tharp for a 63–0 lead. In the fourth quarter, touchdowns were scored on a 63-yard Tommy Lewis run, a 44-yard Luna run, an 11-yard Tharp run and a 19-yard Hobson run to make the final score 89–0. In total, the Crimson Tide outgained the Statesmen in total offense 553 to 163 yards.

=== LSU ===
Team	1	2	3	4	Total
• LSU	0	6	7	0	13
#9 Alabama	0	0	7	0	7

- Date: September 29
- Location: Ladd Stadium
  Mobile, AL
- Game attendance: 32,169

To open conference play for the 1951 season, Alabama was defeated by LSU 13–7 at Ladd Stadium in Mobile. After a scoreless first quarter, LSU took a 6–0 halftime lead when James Barton threw a 20-yard touchdown pass to Warren Virgets. The Crimson Tide responded to take a 7–6 lead in the third after Bobby Marlow scored on a one-yard touchdown run. However, their lead was short lived as Leroy Labat scored the game-winning touchdown for the Tigers on an 18-yard run for the 13–7 victory.

=== Vanderbilt ===
Team	1	2	3	4	Total
Alabama	7	6	0	7	20
• Vanderbilt	0	12	10	0	22

- Date: October 6
- Location: Dudley Field
  Nashville, TN
- Game attendance: 25,000

In what was their first road game of the season, the Crimson Tide lost to the Vanderbilt Commodores by a final score of 22–20 in Nashville. After Alabama took a 7–0 lead in the first quarter on a one-yard James Melton run, Vanderbilt took a 12–7 lead in the second quarter on a Richard Foster run and a four-yard Charles Wade pass to Ted Kirkland. The Crimson Tide responded with a one-yard Bobby Marlow touchdown run late in the second to take a 13–12 halftime lead. The Commodores rebounded in the third to retake the lead 22–13 after Foster scored on a 10-yard run and later kick a 46-yard field goal. A four-yard Marlow touchdown in the fourth made the final score 22–20 in favor of the Commodores.

=== Villanova ===
Team	1	2	3	4	Total
• Villanova	0	21	7	13	41
Alabama	0	0	6	12	18

- Date: October 12
- Location: Denny Stadium
  Tuscaloosa, AL
- Game attendance: 15,000

On a Friday night in the first Tuscaloosa game of the season, Alabama was defeated by the Villanova Wildcats, 41–18, at Denny Stadium in the only all-time meeting between the schools. After a scoreless first quarter, Villanova took a 21–0 lead into halftime with touchdowns scored on touchdown runs of eight-yards by Robert Haner, two-yards by Dick Bedesem and 38-yards by Benjamin Addiego. Alabama opened the third with their first points of the game on a two-yard Bobby Marlow touchdown run. However, the Wildcats responded with a four-yard William Brannau touchdown pass to Joseph Rilo to make the score 28–6 as the teams entered the fourth quarter.

In the fourth quarter, each team scored a pair of touchdowns and made the final score 41–18 in favor of the Wildcats. Alabama scored on a pair of long touchdown passes from Clell Hobson to George MacAfee from 75 and 67 yards and Villanova scored on touchdown runs of one yard by Bedesem and five yards by Addiego. The loss marked the first time the Crimson Tide lost three consecutive games since the 1927 season, ended a 20-game winning streak at Denny Stadium and the 41 points allowed to the Wildcats were the most scored by an Alabama opponent since a 54–4 loss to Sewanee in 1907.

=== Tennessee ===
Third Saturday in October

Team	1	2	3	4	Total
• #2 Tennessee	0	7	7	13	27
Alabama	7	0	0	6	13

- Date: October 20
- Location: Legion Field
  Birmingham, AL
- Game attendance: 44,000
- Television network: ABC

Alabama lost 27–13 to the rival Tennessee Volunteers and it marked both their first loss to Tennessee at Legion Field since the 1940 season and the first four-game losing streak for the Crimson Tide since the 1910 season. Alabama took a 7–0 first quarter lead on a one-yard Bobby Marlow run only to see Tennessee tie the game 7–7 at halftime after Bert Rechichar scored on a 20-yard Hank Lauricella touchdown pass in the second quarter. The Volunteers then took a 14–7 lead in the third on a three-yard Dick Ernsberger run before they closed the game with a pair of touchdowns in the fourth. In the final period Tennessee touchdowns were scored by Lauricella on a 35-yard run and on a 20-yard Harold Payne pass to Vince Kaseta; the lone Alabama touchdown was scored on a second, one-yard Marlow run to make the final score 27–13.

Although the first Alabama game to be televised occurred in their matchup at Fordham in 1939, this game was broadcast on ABC and was the first Alabama game to be broadcast over network television.

=== Mississippi State ===
Team	1	2	3	4	Total
• Alabama	0	7	0	0	7
Mississippi State	0	0	0	0	0

- Date: October 27
- Location: Scott Field
  Starkville, MS
- Game attendance: 20,000

At Starkville, the Crimson Tide shutout the Mississippi State Maroons 7–0 to end their four-game losing streak at Scott Field. The only points of the game came in the second quarter when Clell Hobson threw a 39-yard touchdown pass to Larry Chiodetti for Alabama.

=== Georgia ===
Team	1	2	3	4	Total
• Alabama	0	0	6	10	16
Georgia	0	7	0	7	14

- Date: November 3
- Location: Sanford Stadium
  Athens, GA
- Game attendance: 32,000

In their final road game of the season, Alabama defeated the Georgia Bulldogs 16–14 Sanford Stadium in Athens. After a scoreless first quarter, the Bulldogs took a 7–0 halftime lead after Conrad Manisera returned a punt 72-yards for a second-quarter touchdown. The Crimson Tide responded over the final two quarters with a pair of Clell Hobson touchdown passes to George McCain from 14 and 21-yards and a 21-yard Harold Lutz field goal for a 16–7 lead. Georgia then scored the final touchdown of the game late in the fourth on a two-yard Manisera run to make the final score 16–14.

=== Mississippi Southern ===
Team	1	2	3	4	Total
Mississippi Southern	7	0	0	0	7
• Alabama	19	7	14	0	40

- Date: November 10
- Location: Denny Stadium
  Tuscaloosa, AL
- Game attendance: 13,000

After the Mississippi Southern Southerners took a 7–0 lead, the Crimson Tide responded with 40 unanswered points for the 40–7 victory at Denny Stadium. The lone Southern touchdown came early in the first quarter on a two-yard Granville Hart run for their brief 7–0 lead. Alabama responded with touchdowns on 58-yard Virgil Willis interception return and runs of 53 and five yards by George McCain for a 19–7 Crimson Tide lead at the end of the first quarter. They then closed the game with touchdowns on a four-yard Bobby Marlow run in the third and two-yard Thomas Tharp run and 21-yard Clell Hobson pass to Bobby Luna in the fourth quarter.

=== Georgia Tech ===
Team	1	2	3	4	Total
• #7 Georgia Tech	0	6	14	7	27
Alabama	0	0	0	7	7

- Date: November 17
- Location: Legion Field
  Birmingham, AL
- Game attendance: 35,000

After Alabama held Georgia Tech to only six first half points, the Yellow Jackets scored three second half touchdowns en route to a 27–7 victory at Legion Field. The only first half points were scored on a 17-yard Elbert Crawford touchdown pass to Lambert Knox in the second quarter for a 6–0 halftime lead for Tech. The Yellow Jackets continued their scoring into the fourth quarter with touchdowns on a two-yard Windle Hardeman run and 21-yard Crawford pass to Jake Martin in the third and a 31-yard Crawford pass to Knox in the fourth for a 27–0 lead. The only Alabama points were scored late in the fourth on a one-yard Larry Chiodetti run to end the Tech shutout bid.

=== Florida ===
Team	1	2	3	4	Total
• Florida	7	6	10	7	30
Alabama	7	14	0	0	21

- Date: November 24
- Location: Denny Stadium
  Tuscaloosa, AL
- Game attendance: 23,000

On homecoming in Tuscaloosa, 17 unanswered points by Florida in the second half gave the Gators 30–21 win at Denny Stadium. The teams traded touchdowns in the first half to give Alabama a 21–13 halftime lead. Crimson Tide touchdowns were scored on a 10-yard Clell Hobson run, a 73-yard George McCain pass to Al Lary and a six-yard James Melton run; Gators touchdowns were scored on Buford Long touchdown runs of 10 and eight-yards. Florida then closed with game with a 45-yard Haywood Sullivan touchdown pass to James French and a 14-yard Richard Casares field goal in the third and a one-yard Sullivan touchdown run in the fourth for the 30–21 Gators victory.

=== Auburn ===
Iron Bowl

Team	1	2	3	4	Total
Auburn	0	0	0	7	7
• Alabama	6	7	12	0	25

- Date: December 1
- Location: Legion Field
  Birmingham, AL
- Game attendance: 42,000

For the third time in four years since the revival of the Auburn series, Alabama defeated the Tigers 25–7 at Legion Field. The Crimson Tide took a 13–0 halftime lead on touchdown runs of seven-yards by Bobby Marlow in the first and of three-yards by James Melton in the second. Third quarter Marlow touchdown runs of 39 and 22-yards gave Alabama a 25–0 lead before Auburn scored their only points on an eight-yard Homer Williams run in the fourth to make the final score 25–7.

== Personnel ==
=== Varsity letter winners ===
Player	Hometown	Position
Dick Barry	Cordele, Georgia	Fullback
Jack Brown	Selma, Alabama	Quarterback
Ralph Carrigan	Oak Park, Illinois	Center
Larry Chiodetti	Philadelphia, Pennsylvania	Halfback
Joe Compton	Sylacauga, Alabama	Fullback
Bob Conway	Fort Wayne, Indiana	Halfback
Ed Culpepper	Bradenton, Florida	Tackle
Joe Curtis	Birmingham, Alabama	End
Tom Danner	Tuscaloosa, Alabama	Guard
Jim Davis	Hamilton, Alabama	Guard
Clell Hobson	Tuscaloosa, Alabama	Quarterback
Travis Hunt	Albertville, Alabama	Tackle
Hyrle Ivy	Fort Wayne, Indiana	End
Jug Jenkins	Eufaula, Alabama	End
Harold Johnson	Greensboro, Alabama	Center
Lint Jordan	Monticello, Georgia	End
Ed Lary	Northport, Alabama	End
Ed Lary	Northport, Alabama	End
Harry Lee	Birmingham, Alabama	Guard
Tommy Lewis	Greenville, Alabama	Fullback
Bobby Luna	Huntsville, Alabama	Halfback
Harold Lutz	Clinton, Iowa	End
Ken MacAfee	North Easton, Massachusetts	End
Harold Manley	Winfield, Alabama	End
Van Marcus	Birmingham, Alabama	Tackle
Bobby Marlow	Troy, Alabama	Halfback
George McCain	Clanton, Alabama	Halfback
James Melton	Wetumpka, Alabama	Halfback
Fred Mims	Birmingham, Alabama	Guard
John Prom	Jacksonville, Florida	Guard
Jess Richardson	Philadelphia, Pennsylvania	Guard
Jack Smalley	Tuscaloosa, Alabama	Tackle
Thomas Tharp	Birmingham, Alabama	Halfback
Wesley Thompson	Decatur, Alabama	Tackle
Jerry Watford	Gadsden, Alabama	Guard
Bob Wilga	Webster, Massachusetts	Guard
Al Wilhite	Tuscumbia, Alabama	Tackle
Billy Williams	Lincoln, Alabama	Tackle
Virgil Willis	Tifton, Georgia	End
Bobby Wilson	Bay Minette, Alabama	Quarterback

=== Coaching staff ===
Name	Position	Seasons at Alabama	Alma mater
Harold Drew	Head coach	18	Bates (1916)
Lew Bostick	Assistant coach	8	Alabama (1939)
Tilden Campbell	Assistant coach	12	Alabama (1935)
Hank Crisp	Assistant coach	24	VPI (1920)
Joe Kilgrow	Assistant coach	8	Alabama (1937)
Malcolm Laney	Assistant coach	8	Alabama (1932)
James Nisbet	Assistant coach	3	Alabama (1937)
