= Tom Samuels =

American football and basketball coach

Rome Rankin
Biographical details
- Born: March 28, 1909; Richmond, Kentucky, U.S.
- Died: November 4, 1996 (aged 87); Leesburg, Florida, U.S.

Playing career

Football
- 1930–1931: Michigan
- Position: Tackle

Coaching career (HC unless noted)

Football
- 1932–1946: Eastern Kentucky (line)
- 1947–1953: Eastern Kentucky

Track and field
- 1935–1946: Eastern Kentucky

Head coaching record
- Overall: 41–24–2 (football)

Thomas Curtis Samuels (March 28, 1909 – November 4, 1996) was an American college football player and coach, track coach, and pharmacist. He served as the head football coach at Eastern Kentucky State College—now known as Eastern Kentucky University–from 1947 to 1953, compiling a record of 41–24–2. Samuels was also the head track coach at Eastern Kentucky from 1935 to 1946. He left coaching in 1953 to go into the pharmaceutical business in Orlando, Florida.

== Early life and playing career ==
Samuels was born and raised in Richmond, Kentucky, where he attended Madison High School. He moved to Canton, Ohio, where he attended Canton McKinley High School. Samuels played college football at the University of Michigan, lettering as a tackle in 1930 and 1931.

== Coaching career ==
After graduating from Michigan in 1932 with a Bachelor of Science in chemistry, Samuels began his coaching career that fall as an assistant football coach Eastern Kentucky State Teachers College under head coach Turkey Hughes. Samuels succeeded Rome Rankin as head football coach at Eastern Kentucky in 1947. He resigned after the 1953 season to pursue a career in pharmaceuticals in Orlando, Florida.

== Pharmaceutical career ==
in 1953, Samuels bought an interest in Angebilt Pharmacy in Orlando, bringing him into partnership with Mrs. Maynard Evans and Dick Webb. He owned the Angebilt Pharmacy until 1962, when he moved his prescription business to Eckerd Drugs.

== Honors and death ==
The Tom C. Samuels track at Eastern Kentucky is named for Samuels and was dedicated to him in 1976. Samuels died on November 4, 1996, at Leesburg Regional Medical Center in Leesburg, Florida.

== Head coaching record ==
=== Football ===
Year	Team	Overall	Conference	Standing	Bowl/playoffs
Eastern Kentucky Maroons (Kentucky Intercollegiate Athletic Conference) (1947)
1947	Eastern Kentucky	5–4			
Eastern Kentucky Maroons (Ohio Valley Conference) (1948)
1948	Eastern Kentucky	8–3	2–2	3rd	
1949	Eastern Kentucky	4–4–1	2–2–1	T–4th	
1950	Eastern Kentucky	6–4	4–2	2nd	
1951	Eastern Kentucky	7–3	4–2	T–2nd	
1952	Eastern Kentucky	3–4–1	0–3–1	5th	
1953	Eastern Kentucky	8–2	4–1	2nd	
Eastern Kentucky:		41–24–2			
Total:		41–24–2			
