= 1951 Tulane Green Wave football team =

American college football season

1951 Tulane Green Wave football
- Conference: Southeastern Conference
- Record: 4–6 (1–5 SEC)
- Head coach: Henry Frnka (6th season)
- Captains: Richard Fugler; Jerome Helluin; Ellsworth Kingery; John McLean
- Home stadium: Tulane Stadium

1951 Southeastern Conference football standings
	Conf.					Overall
Team	W		L		T	W		L		T
No. 5 Georgia Tech +	7	–	0	–	0	11	–	0	–	1
No. 1 Tennessee +	5	–	0	–	0	10	–	1	–	0
LSU	4	–	2	–	1	7	–	3	–	1
Ole Miss	4	–	2	–	1	6	–	3	–	1
No. 15 Kentucky	3	–	3	–	0	8	–	4	–	0
Auburn	3	–	4	–	0	5	–	5	–	0
Vanderbilt	3	–	5	–	0	6	–	5	–	0
Alabama	3	–	5	–	0	5	–	6	–	0
Florida	2	–	4	–	0	5	–	5	–	0
Georgia	2	–	4	–	0	5	–	5	–	0
Mississippi State	2	–	5	–	0	4	–	5	–	0
Tulane	1	–	5	–	0	4	–	6	–	0
+ – Conference co-champions; Rankings from AP Poll

The 1951 Tulane Green Wave football team was an American football team that represented Tulane University as a member of the Southeastern Conference (SEC) during the 1951 college football season. In its sixth year under head coach Henry Frnka, Tulane compiled a 4–6 record (1–5 in conference games), finished last out of 12 teams in the SEC, and was outscored by a total of 172 to 143. Tulane was ranked No. 57 in the 1951 Litkenhous Ratings released in December 1951.

Tackle Jerry Helluin and guard Art Kleinschmidt received recognition on the 1951 All-SEC football team.

The Green Wave played its home games at Tulane Stadium in New Orleans.

== Schedule ==
Date	Opponent	Site	Result	Attendance	Source
September 29	Miami (FL)*	Tulane Stadium; New Orleans, LA	W 21–7		
October 6	No. 19 Baylor*	Tulane Stadium; New Orleans, LA	L 14–27	40,000	
October 13	No. 15 Holy Cross*	Tulane Stadium; New Orleans, LA	W 20–14	30,000	
October 20	at Ole Miss	Hemingway Stadium; Oxford, MS (rivalry)	L 6–25	17,000	
October 27	Auburn	Tulane Stadium; New Orleans, LA (rivalry)	L 0–21		
November 3	Mississippi State	Tulane Stadium; New Orleans, LA	L 7–10		
November 10	No. 12 Kentucky	Tulane Stadium; New Orleans, LA	L 0–37		
November 17	at Vanderbilt	Dudley Field; Nashville, TN	W 14–10	17,000	
November 24	Southeastern Louisiana*	Tulane Stadium; New Orleans, LA	W 48–7		
December 1	at LSU	Tiger Stadium; Baton Rouge, LA (Battle for the Rag)	L 13–14	46,000	
*Non-conference game; Rankings from AP Poll released prior to the game
