= Mark Dean (American football) =

American football player and coach (1917–2006)

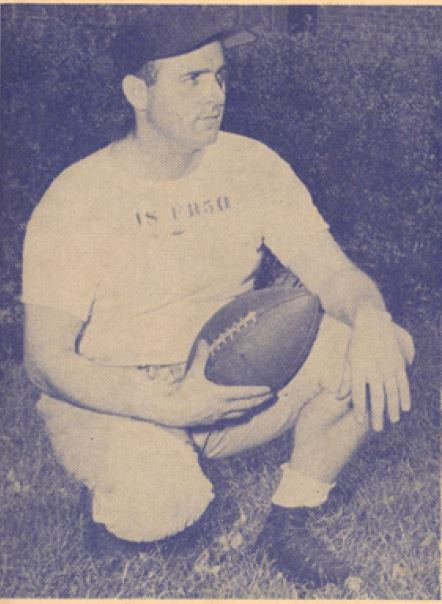

Biographical details
- Born: October 20, 1917; Pecatonica, Illinois, U.S.
- Died: April 5, 2006 (aged 88); Peoria, Arizona, U.S.

Playing career
- 1935–1937: Northern Illinois
- Position: Halfback

Coaching career (HC unless noted)
- 1938: West Des Moines HS (IA)
- 1941: Roodhouse HS (IL)
- 1942: Jacksonville HS (IL)
- 1946–1947: Austin Junior College
- 1948–1950: Superior State
- 1951–1954: Indiana State
- 1956: Indiana State
- 1957–1964: Northern Illinois (line)

Head coaching record
- Overall: 27–34–6 (college)

Accomplishments and honors

Awards
- ICC Coach of the Year (1952)

Mark Dean (October 20, 1917 – April 5, 2006) was an American football player and coach. He served as the head football coach at Austin Junior College (1946–1947), Superior State Teacher's College (1948–1950) and Indiana State University (1951–1954, 1956).

== Playing career ==
Dean played football as a halfback at Northern Illinois University from 1935 through 1937; in addition, he spent one season as a member of the Huskies JV basketball team.

== Coaching career ==
Dean began his coaching career in 1938 in West Des Moines, Iowa; after four years, he then moved on to Roodhouse High School in Roodhouse, Illinois, tallying a mark of 8–0, winning the 1942 conference title. He moved on to Jacksonville High School in Jacksonville, Illinois for the 1943 season and led the Crimson to a record of 4–4–1. From 1944 to 1945, Dean was a member of the U.S. Navy and coached the 16th Fleet basketball team.

Following World War II, Dean accepted the head coaching position at Austin Junior College, he led the Blue Devils to two winning seasons and the Minnesota Junior College Athletic Association title before resigning to accept the same position at Superior State Teacher's College, continuing to climb the coaching ladder; Dean accepted the head coaching job at Indiana State University; he held the position from 1951 to 1954, and the 1956 season.

Dean resigned after the 1956–57 academic year to return to his alma mater as an assistant to Howard Fletcher; he spent the next eight seasons helping to build a highly successful program; the Huskies won Interstate Intercollegiate Athletic Conference (IIAC) titles in 1963 and 1964 and the AP National Championship (College Division) in 1963. Following the graduation of his son Jack in 1964, Dean resigned from coaching but continued to serve as an administrator until the early 1980s.

=== Indiana State ===
Dean accepted the Indiana State job in 1951, following the resignation of George Ashworth. He promised a diverse offense, utilized the T, split-T, and the single-wing, but said ultimately, his system would fit the talent of team. During his five-year tenure, he compiled an Indiana Collegiate Conference (ICC) record of 6–17–3 and an overall record of 15–20–4. His record in homecoming games was 1–4. He was named the ICC Coach of the Year for the 1952 season, arguably his most successful season at Indiana State. He spent the 1955 season on a leave of absence to complete his Ph.D. but returned to the coaching ranks for the 1956 season. More than five of his players were selected All-Conference during his tenure.

=== Northern Illinois ===
In 1957, Dean chose to join the Northern Illinois staff led by head coach Howard Fletcher's staff as a line coach; assisting in one of the best eras in that school's sports history. The Huskies success eventually led to NCAA Division I-FBS status, the 'new' Huskie Stadium, and membership in the Mid-American Conference---all within the decade of the Associated Press and NAIA national titles, and Mineral Water Bowl appearance in 1963.

Dean taught undergraduate and graduate courses for the university; served as the coordinator of student affairs, and directed student teaching at Northern Illinois.

In 1978, he was elected president of the National Association for Sport and Physical Education.

Lastly, he was the public address announcer at Chick Evans Field House for men's basketball and men's gymnastics.

== Family ==
Dean is the father of fellow Northern Illinois University Hall of Famer Jack Dean (1961–1964). The one-time holder of the school's career all-purpose yardage record (3,668 yards), Dean, played halfback and quarterback for Fletcher, was named the Interstate Intercollegiate Athletic Conference Player of the Year honors as a senior, and pursued professional football with the Washington Redskins, Pittsburgh Steelers, and Edmonton Eskimos.

== Head coaching record ==
=== Junior college ===
Year	Team	Overall	Conference	Standing	Bowl/playoffs
Austin Junior College Blue Devils (Independent, Southern Jr College Conf) (1946–1947)
1946	Austin Junior College	5–1–1			
1947	Austin Junior College	6–2	3–1	1st	
Austin Junior College:		11–3–1	3–1		
Total:		11–3–1			

=== College ===
Year	Team	Overall	Conference	Standing	Bowl/playoffs
Superior State Yellowjackets (Wisconsin State Teachers College Conference) (1948–1950)
1948	Superior State	5–3	3–3	T–5th	
1949	Superior State	3–6	2–4	8th	
1950	Superior State	3–4–2	1–3–2	8th	
Superior State:		11–13–2	6–10–2		
Indiana State Sycamores (Indiana Collegiate Conference) (1951–1954)
1951	Indiana State	0–6–1	0–3–1	5th	
1952	Indiana State	4–1–3	2–1–2	T–3rd	
1953	Indiana State	5–3	2–3	T–4th	
1954	Indiana State	5–5	2–4	T–5th	
Indiana State Sycamores (Indiana Collegiate Conference) (1956)
1956	Indiana State	2–6	0–6	7th	
Indiana State:		16–21–4	6–17–3		
Total:		27–34–6			
