= 1951 Eastern Kentucky Maroons football team =

American college football season

1951 Eastern Kentucky Maroons football
- Conference: Ohio Valley Conference
- Record: 7–3 (4–2 OVC)
- Head coach: Tom Samuels (5th season)
- Home stadium: Hanger Stadium

1951 Ohio Valley Conference football standings
	Conf.					Overall
Team	W		L		T	W		L		T
Murray State $	5	–	1	–	0	8	–	1	–	0
Eastern Kentucky	4	–	2	–	0	7	–	3	–	0
Marshall	4	–	2	–	0	5	–	5	–	1
Evansville	3	–	3	–	0	5	–	5	–	0
Tennessee Tech	3	–	3	–	0	5	–	5	–	1
Western Kentucky	2	–	4	–	0	4	–	5	–	0
Morehead State	0	–	6	–	0	1	–	7	–	0
$ – Conference champion

The 1951 Eastern Kentucky Maroons football team represented Eastern Kentucky State College—now known as Eastern Kentucky University–as a member of the Ohio Valley Conference (OVC) during the 1951 college football season. Led by fifth-year head coach Tom Samuels, the Maroons compiled an overall record of 7–3 with a mark of 4–2 in conference play, tying for second place in the OVC.

== Schedule ==
Date	Time	Opponent	Site	Result	Attendance	Source
September 22		Hillsdale*	Hanger Stadium; Richmond, KY	W 21–12		
September 29		Marshall	Hanger Stadium; Richmond, KY	W 13–6		
October 6		at Murray State	Murray, KY	L 0–9		
October 13	9:00 p.m.	at Tennessee Tech	Overall Field; Cookeville, TN	W 15–14	6,500	
October 20		Erskine*	Hanger Stadium; Richmond, KY	W 58–0		
October 27	7:30 p.m.	Morehead State	Hanger Stadium; Richmond, KY (Old Hawg Rifle)	W 6–0		
November 3	3:00 p.m.	at Evansville	Reitz Bowl; Evansville, IN	L 6–7	2,000	
November 10		Western Kentucky^{†}	Hanger Stadium; Richmond, KY (rivalry)	W 31–7		
November 17		at Ohio*	Peden Stadium; Athens, OH	W 27–13		
December 1	2:30 p.m.	at Stetson*	DeLand Municipal Stadium; DeLand, FL	L 14–26		
*Non-conference game; ^{†}Homecoming; All times are in Eastern time
