= 1951 Georgia Tech Yellow Jackets football team =

American college football season

1951 Georgia Tech Yellow Jackets football

National champion (Berryman) Co-national champion (Boand) SEC co-champion Orange Bowl champion

Orange Bowl, W 17–14 vs. Baylor
- Conference: Southeastern Conference

Ranking
- Coaches: No. 5
- AP: No. 5
- Record: 11–0–1 (7–0 SEC)
- Head coach: Bobby Dodd (7th season)
- Captain: Lamar Wheat
- Home stadium: Grant Field

1951 Southeastern Conference football standings
	Conf.					Overall
Team	W		L		T	W		L		T
No. 5 Georgia Tech +	7	–	0	–	0	11	–	0	–	1
No. 1 Tennessee +	5	–	0	–	0	10	–	1	–	0
LSU	4	–	2	–	1	7	–	3	–	1
Ole Miss	4	–	2	–	1	6	–	3	–	1
No. 15 Kentucky	3	–	3	–	0	8	–	4	–	0
Auburn	3	–	4	–	0	5	–	5	–	0
Vanderbilt	3	–	5	–	0	6	–	5	–	0
Alabama	3	–	5	–	0	5	–	6	–	0
Florida	2	–	4	–	0	5	–	5	–	0
Georgia	2	–	4	–	0	5	–	5	–	0
Mississippi State	2	–	5	–	0	4	–	5	–	0
Tulane	1	–	5	–	0	4	–	6	–	0
+ – Conference co-champions; Rankings from AP Poll

The 1951 Georgia Tech Yellow Jackets football team represented the Georgia Tech Yellow Jackets of the Georgia Institute of Technology during the 1951 college football season. The team was named national champion by Berryman and co-champion by Boand.

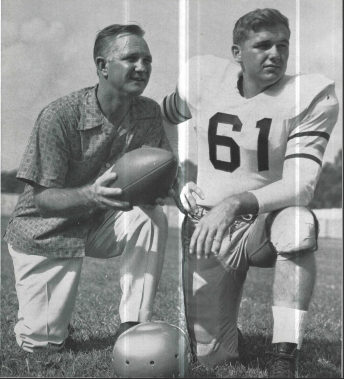
Head coach Bobby Dodd and team captain Lamar Wheat

== Schedule ==
Date	Opponent	Rank	Site	Result	Attendance	Source
September 22	SMU*		Grant Field; Atlanta, GA	W 21–7	33,000	
September 29	at Florida		Florida Field; Gainesville, FL	W 27–0	39,000	
October 6	at No. 17 Kentucky	No. 11	McLean Stadium; Lexington, KY	W 13–7	35,000	
October 13	LSU	No. 8	Grant Field; Atlanta, GA	W 25–7	30,000	
October 20	Auburn	No. 5	Grant Field; Atlanta, Ga (rivalry)	W 27–7	31,000	
October 27	at Vanderbilt	No. 3	Dudley Field; Nashville, TN (rivalry)	W 8–7	26,000	
November 3	Duke*^{†}	No. 5	Grant Field; Atlanta, GA	T 14–14	36,000	
November 10	VMI*	No. 8	Grant Field; Atlanta, GA	W 34–7	21,000	
November 17	at Alabama	No. 7	Legion Field; Birmingham, AL (rivalry)	W 27–7	35,000	
November 24	Davidson*	No. 7	Grant Field; Atlanta, GA	W 34–7	18,000	
December 1	Georgia	No. 6	Grant Field; Atlanta, GA (Clean, Old-Fashioned Hate)	W 48–6	40,000	
January 1	vs. No. 9 Baylor*	No. 5	Burdine Stadium; Miami, FL (Orange Bowl)	W 17–14	65,837	
*Non-conference game; ^{†}Homecoming; Rankings from AP Poll released prior to the game
