= 1951 Georgia Bulldogs football team =

American college football season

1951 Georgia Bulldogs football
- Conference: Southeastern Conference
- Record: 5–5 (2–4 SEC)
- Head coach: Wally Butts (13th season)
- Home stadium: Sanford Stadium

1951 Southeastern Conference football standings
	Conf.					Overall
Team	W		L		T	W		L		T
No. 5 Georgia Tech +	7	–	0	–	0	11	–	0	–	1
No. 1 Tennessee +	5	–	0	–	0	10	–	1	–	0
LSU	4	–	2	–	1	7	–	3	–	1
Ole Miss	4	–	2	–	1	6	–	3	–	1
No. 15 Kentucky	3	–	3	–	0	8	–	4	–	0
Auburn	3	–	4	–	0	5	–	5	–	0
Vanderbilt	3	–	5	–	0	6	–	5	–	0
Alabama	3	–	5	–	0	5	–	6	–	0
Florida	2	–	4	–	0	5	–	5	–	0
Georgia	2	–	4	–	0	5	–	5	–	0
Mississippi State	2	–	5	–	0	4	–	5	–	0
Tulane	1	–	5	–	0	4	–	6	–	0
+ – Conference co-champions; Rankings from AP Poll

The 1951 Georgia Bulldogs football team represented the Georgia Bulldogs of the University of Georgia during the 1951 college football season.

== Schedule ==
Date	Opponent	Rank	Site	Result	Attendance	Source
September 22	George Washington*		Sanford Stadium; Athens, GA	W 33–0	15,000	
September 29	at North Carolina*		Kenan Memorial Stadium; Chapel Hill, NC	W 28–16	36,000–41,000	
October 6	at Mississippi State	No. 13	Scott Field; Starkville, MS	L 0–6	20,000	
October 13	No. 10 Maryland*		Sanford Stadium; Athens, GA	L 7–43	30,000	
October 20	LSU		Sanford Stadium; Athens, GA	L 0–7		
October 27	Boston College*		Sanford Stadium; Athens, GA	W 35–28	10,000	
November 3	Alabama^{†}		Sanford Stadium; Athens, GA (rivalry)	L 14–16	32,000	
November 10	vs. Florida		Gator Bowl Stadium; Jacksonville, FL (rivalry)	W 7–6	37,216	
November 17	vs. Auburn		Memorial Stadium; Columbus, GA (Deep South's Oldest Rivalry)	W 46–14		
December 1	at No. 5 Georgia Tech		Grant Field; Atlanta, GA (Clean, Old-Fashioned Hate)	L 6–48	40,000	
*Non-conference game; ^{†}Homecoming; Rankings from AP Poll released prior to the game

== Roster ==
- LE Art DeCarlo
- LE Dexter Poss
- LT Bobby Anglin
- LG Frank Salerno
- C Jerry McClung
- RG Edward Greenway
- RT Richard Yelvington,
- RE Harry Babcock
- QB Zeke Bratkowski
- LH Zippy Morocco
- RH Lauren Hargrove
- FB Dick Raber
- FB Fred Bilyeu
