= 1951 LSU Tigers football team =

American college football season

1951 LSU Tigers football
- Conference: Southeastern Conference
- Record: 7–3–1 (4–2–1 SEC)
- Head coach: Gaynell Tinsley (4th season)
- Home stadium: Tiger Stadium

1951 Southeastern Conference football standings
	Conf.					Overall
Team	W		L		T	W		L		T
No. 5 Georgia Tech +	7	–	0	–	0	11	–	0	–	1
No. 1 Tennessee +	5	–	0	–	0	10	–	1	–	0
LSU	4	–	2	–	1	7	–	3	–	1
Ole Miss	4	–	2	–	1	6	–	3	–	1
No. 15 Kentucky	3	–	3	–	0	8	–	4	–	0
Auburn	3	–	4	–	0	5	–	5	–	0
Vanderbilt	3	–	5	–	0	6	–	5	–	0
Alabama	3	–	5	–	0	5	–	6	–	0
Florida	2	–	4	–	0	5	–	5	–	0
Georgia	2	–	4	–	0	5	–	5	–	0
Mississippi State	2	–	5	–	0	4	–	5	–	0
Tulane	1	–	5	–	0	4	–	6	–	0
+ – Conference co-champions; Rankings from AP Poll

The 1951 LSU Tigers football team represented Louisiana State University (LSU) in the 1951 college football season.

== Schedule ==
Date	Opponent	Site	Result	Attendance	Source
September 22	Mississippi Southern*	Tiger Stadium; Baton Rouge, LA	W 13–0	24,000	
September 29	at No. 9 Alabama	Ladd Stadium; Mobile, AL (rivalry)	W 13–7	32,169	
October 6	Rice*	Tiger Stadium; Baton Rouge, LA	W 7–6	44,000	
October 13	at No. 8 Georgia Tech	Grant Field; Atlanta, GA	L 7–25	30,000	
October 20	at Georgia	Sanford Stadium; Athens, GA	W 7–0		
October 27	No. 5 Maryland	Tiger Stadium; Baton Rouge, LA	L 0–27	38,000	
November 3	Ole Miss^{†}	Tiger Stadium; Baton Rouge, LA (rivalry)	T 6–6		
November 10	Vanderbilt	Tiger Stadium; Baton Rouge, LA	L 13–20	18,000	
November 17	Mississippi State	Tiger Stadium; Baton Rouge, LA (rivalry)	W 3–0	20,000	
November 24	vs. Villanova	State Fair Stadium; Shreveport, LA	W 13–7	13,000	
December 1	Tulane	Tiger Stadium; Baton Rouge, LA (Battle for the Rag)	W 14–13	46,000	
*Non-conference game; ^{†}Homecoming; Rankings from AP Poll released prior to the game
