= 1951 Tennessee Tech Golden Eagles football team =

American college football season

1951 Tennessee Tech Golden Eagles football
- Conference: Ohio Valley Conference
- Record: 5–5–1 (3–3 OVC)
- Head coach: Star Wood (2nd season)
- Home stadium: Overall Field

1951 Ohio Valley Conference football standings
	Conf.					Overall
Team	W		L		T	W		L		T
Murray State $	5	–	1	–	0	8	–	1	–	0
Eastern Kentucky	4	–	2	–	0	7	–	3	–	0
Marshall	4	–	2	–	0	5	–	5	–	1
Evansville	3	–	3	–	0	5	–	5	–	0
Tennessee Tech	3	–	3	–	0	5	–	5	–	1
Western Kentucky	2	–	4	–	0	4	–	5	–	0
Morehead State	0	–	6	–	0	1	–	7	–	0
$ – Conference champion

The 1951 Tennessee Tech Golden Eagles football team represented Tennessee Polytechnic Institute (TPI)—now known as Tennessee Tech–as a member of the Ohio Valley Conference (OVC) during the 1951 college football season. Led by Star Wood in his second and final season as head coach, the Golden Eagles compiled an overall record of 5–5–1 with a mark of 3–3 in conference play, tying for fourth place in the OVC. Tennessee Tech played home games at Overall Field in Cookeville, Tennessee.

== Schedule ==
Date	Time	Opponent	Site	Result	Attendance	Source
September 15	2:00 p.m.	at No. 6 Kentucky*	McLean Stadium; Lexington, KY	L 72–13	26,000	
September 22		Carson–Newman*	Cookeville, TN	W 42–6		
September 29		Murray State	Cookeville, TN	L 7–20	5,000	
October 6		at Morehead State	Morehead, KY	W 17–14		
October 13	8:00 p.m.	Eastern Kentucky^{†}	Overall Field; Cookeville, TN	L 14–15	6,500	
October 20	2:00 p.m.	Western Kentucky	Bowling Green, KY	W 14–7	4,500	
October 27	2:00 p.m.	at No. 1 Tennessee*	Shields–Watkins Field; Knoxville, TN	L 0–68		
November 3		Marshall	Cookeville, TN	L 13–20		
November 10		at East Tennessee State*	State College Stadium; Johnson City, TN	W 33–0		
November 17	8:00 p.m.	Evansville	Cookeville TN	W 38–13	1,000	
November 22	2:00 p.m.	at Middle Tennessee*	Horace Jones Field; Murfreesboro, TN	T 14–14	7,500	
*Non-conference game; ^{†}Homecoming; Rankings from AP Poll released prior to the game; All times are in Central time
