= 1951 Florida Gators football team =

American college football season

1951 Florida Gators football
- Conference: Southeastern Conference
- Record: 5–5 (2–4 SEC)
- Head coach: Bob Woodruff (2nd season)
- Home stadium: Florida Field

1951 Southeastern Conference football standings
	Conf.					Overall
Team	W		L		T	W		L		T
No. 5 Georgia Tech +	7	–	0	–	0	11	–	0	–	1
No. 1 Tennessee +	5	–	0	–	0	10	–	1	–	0
LSU	4	–	2	–	1	7	–	3	–	1
Ole Miss	4	–	2	–	1	6	–	3	–	1
No. 15 Kentucky	3	–	3	–	0	8	–	4	–	0
Auburn	3	–	4	–	0	5	–	5	–	0
Vanderbilt	3	–	5	–	0	6	–	5	–	0
Alabama	3	–	5	–	0	5	–	6	–	0
Florida	2	–	4	–	0	5	–	5	–	0
Georgia	2	–	4	–	0	5	–	5	–	0
Mississippi State	2	–	5	–	0	4	–	5	–	0
Tulane	1	–	5	–	0	4	–	6	–	0
+ – Conference co-champions; Rankings from AP Poll

The 1951 Florida Gators football team represented the University of Florida during the 1951 college football season. The season was Bob Woodruff's second as the head coach of the Florida Gators football team. The highlights of the season included two intersectional victories over the Wyoming Cowboys (13–0) and the Loyola Lions (40–7), and two Southeastern Conference (SEC) victories over the Vanderbilt Commodores (33–13) during Florida's homecoming and the Alabama Crimson Tide (30–21) in Tuscaloosa, Alabama. For the second year in a row, Woodruff's 1951 Florida Gators finished 5–5 overall and 2–4 in the SEC, placing ninth among twelve conference teams.

== Schedule ==
Date	Opponent	Site	Result	Attendance	Source
September 15	vs. Wyoming*	Gator Bowl Stadium; Jacksonville, FL	W 13–0	22,000–25,000	
September 22	The Citadel*	Florida Field; Gainesville, FL	W 27–7	40,000	
September 29	Georgia Tech	Florida Field; Gainesville, FL	L 0–27	39,000	
October 6	at Loyola (CA)*	Rose Bowl; Pasadena, CA	W 40–7	15,350	
October 13	at Auburn	Cliff Hare Stadium; Auburn, AL (rivalry)	L 13–14	22,500	
October 20	Vanderbilt^{†}	Florida Field; Gainesville, FL	W 33–13		
October 27	No. 17 Kentucky	Florida Field; Gainesville, FL (rivalry)	L 6–14	31,000	
November 10	vs. Georgia	Gator Bowl Stadium; Jacksonville, FL (rivalry)	L 6–7	37,216	
November 17	at Miami (FL)*	Burdine Stadium; Miami, FL (rivalry)	L 6–21	61,602	
November 24	at Alabama	Denny Stadium; Tuscaloosa, AL (rivalry)	W 30–21	23,000	
*Non-conference game; ^{†}Homecoming; Rankings from AP Poll released prior to the game
