= 1951 Butler Bulldogs football team =

American college football season

1951 Butler Bulldogs football
- Conference: Indiana Collegiate Conference
- Record: 4–4–1 (3–2 ICC)
- Head coach: Tony Hinkle (14th season)
- Home stadium: Butler Bowl

1951 Indiana Collegiate Conference football standings
	Conf.					Overall
Team	W		L		T	W		L		T
Valparaiso $	4	–	0	–	0	9	–	0	–	0
Saint Joseph's (IN)	3	–	1	–	0	4	–	4	–	0
Butler	3	–	2	–	0	4	–	4	–	1
Evansville	1	–	1	–	0	5	–	5	–	0
Indiana State	0	–	3	–	1	0	–	6	–	1
Ball State	0	–	4	–	1	0	–	6	–	1
$ – Conference champion

The 1951 Butler Bulldogs football team represented Butler University as a member of the Indiana Collegiate Conference (ICC) during the 1951 college football season. Led by 14th-year head coach Tony Hinkle, the Bulldogs compiled an overall record of 4–4–1 with a mark of 3–2 in conference play, placing third in the ICC. The team played home games at the Butler Bowl in Indianapolis.

== Schedule ==
Date	Opponent	Site	Result	Attendance	Source
September 22	Valparaiso	Butler Bowl; Indianapolis, IN (rivalry)	L 7–41	4,000	
September 29	Western Reserve*	Butler Bowl; Indianapolis, IN	W 7–6	3,000	
October 6	at Wabash*	Crawfordsville, IN	T 26–26		
October 13	Ball State	Butler Bowl; Indianapolis, IN	W 20–14	3,000	
October 20	at Saint Joseph's (IN)	Rensselaer, IN	L 6–12		
October 27	Evansville^{†}	Butler Bowl; Indianapolis, IN	W 27–12	1,500	
November 3	Western Michigan*	Butler Bowl; Indianapolis, IN	L 0–20		
November 10	at Washington University*	Francis Field; St. Louis, MO	L 13–20	2,000	
November 17	at Indiana State	Memorial Stadium; Terre Haute, IN	W 14–7		
*Non-conference game; ^{†}Homecoming
