= 1951 Murray State Thoroughbreds football team =

American college football season

1951 Murray State Thoroughbreds football

OVC champion
- Conference: Ohio Valley Conference
- Record: 8–1 (5–1 OVC)
- Head coach: Fred Faurot (4th season)
- Home stadium: Cutchin Stadium

1951 Ohio Valley Conference football standings
	Conf.					Overall
Team	W		L		T	W		L		T
Murray State $	5	–	1	–	0	8	–	1	–	0
Eastern Kentucky	4	–	2	–	0	7	–	3	–	0
Marshall	4	–	2	–	0	5	–	5	–	1
Evansville	3	–	3	–	0	5	–	5	–	0
Tennessee Tech	3	–	3	–	0	5	–	5	–	1
Western Kentucky	2	–	4	–	0	4	–	5	–	0
Morehead State	0	–	6	–	0	1	–	7	–	0
$ – Conference champion

The 1951 Murray State Thoroughbreds football team was an American football team that represented Murray State College—now known as Murray State University—as a member of the Ohio Valley Conference (OVC) during the 1951 college football season. Led by fourth-year head coach Fred Faurot, the Thoroughbreds compiled an overall record of 8–1 with a mark of 5–1 in conference play, winning the OVC title.

== Schedule ==
Date	Time	Opponent	Site	Result	Attendance	Source
September 22		Missouri Mines*	Cutchin Stadium; Murray, KY	W 31–7	5,000	
September 29		at Tennessee Tech	Cookeville, TN	W 20–7	5,000	
October 6		Eastern Kentucky	Murray, KY	W 9–0		
October 13		at Marshall	Fairfield Stadium; Huntington, WV	W 28–13	7,000	
October 20	8:00 p.m.	at Evansville	Reitz Bowl; Evansville, IN	L 13–14	400	
October 27		Delta State*^{†}	Murray, KY	W 33–0	4,000	
November 3		at Morehead State	Morehead, KY	W 14–0	2,800	
November 10		Middle Tennessee*	Cutchin Stadium; Murray, KY	W 19–7		
November 17		Western Kentucky	Murray, KY (rivalry)	W 23–6	4,000	
*Non-conference game; ^{†}Homecoming; All times are in Central time
