= 1951 East Tennessee State Buccaneers football team =

American college football season

1951 East Tennessee State Buccaneers football
- Conference: Smoky Mountain Conference, Volunteer State Athletic Conference
- Record: 4–5 (1–1 Smoky Mountain, 1–1 VSAC)
- Head coach: Loyd Roberts (4th season)
- Captains: Kenneth "Birdlegs" Bryan; Gene "Shadow" Hall
- Home stadium: State College Stadium

1951 Smoky Mountain Conference football standings
	Conf.					Overall
Team	W		L		T	W		L		T
Emory and Henry $	2	–	0	–	0	9	–	0	–	1
East Tennessee State	1	–	1	–	0	4	–	5	–	0
Carson–Newman	0	–	2	–	0	4	–	6	–	0
$ – Conference champion

The 1951 East Tennessee State Buccaneers football team was an American football team that represented East Tennessee State College (ETSC)—now known as East Tennessee State University—as a member of the Smoky Mountain Conference and the Volunteer State Athletic Conference (VSAC) during the 1951 college football season. Led by Loyd Roberts in his fifth and final season as head coach, the Buccaneers compiled an overall a record of 4–5, with marks of 1–1 against Smoky Mountain opponents and in VSAC play. The team's co-captains were Kenneth "Birdlegs" Bryan and Gene "Shadow" Hall. The 1951 season was East Tennessee State's last as a member of the Smoky Mountain Conference.

== Schedule ==
Date	Time	Opponent	Site	Result	Attendance	Source
September 15		Western Carolina*	State College Stadium; Johnson City, TN	L 6–7		
September 22	8:00 p.m.	Austin Peay	Johnson City, TN	W 13–12		
September 29		at Morehead State*	Morehead, KY	L 0–14		
October 6	8:00 p.m.	vs. Guilford*	J. Fred Johnson Memorial Park; Kingsport, TN	W 29–7	1,500	
October 13		at Maryville (TN)*	Maryville, TN	W 27–0		
October 20	7:00 p.m.	Carson–Newman^{†}	State College Stadium; Johnson City, TN	W 33–2	5,000	
November 3	8:00 p.m.	Emory and Henry	Bristol Municipal Stadium; Bristol, TN	L 7–28		
November 10		Tennessee Tech*	State College Stadium; Johnson City, TN	L 0–33		
November 15	8:30 p.m.	at Middle Tennessee	Horace Jones Field; Murfreesboro, TN	L 0–45		
*Non-conference game; ^{†}Homecoming; All times are in Eastern time
