= 1951 Ball State Cardinals football team =

American college football season

1951 Ball State Cardinals football
- Conference: Indiana Collegiate Conference
- Record: 0–6–1 (0–4–1 ICC)
- Head coach: John Magnabosco (16th season)
- Home stadium: Ball State Field, Bearcat Stadium

1951 Indiana Collegiate Conference football standings
	Conf.					Overall
Team	W		L		T	W		L		T
Valparaiso $	4	–	0	–	0	9	–	0	–	0
Saint Joseph's (IN)	3	–	1	–	0	4	–	4	–	0
Butler	3	–	2	–	0	4	–	4	–	1
Evansville	1	–	1	–	0	5	–	5	–	0
Indiana State	0	–	3	–	1	0	–	6	–	1
Ball State	0	–	4	–	1	0	–	6	–	1
$ – Conference champion

The 1951 Ball State Cardinals football team was an American football team that represented Ball State Teachers College (later renamed Ball State University) in the Indiana Collegiate Conference (ICC) during the 1951 college football season. In its 16th season under head coach John Magnabosco, the team compiled a 0–6–1 record and finished in last place in the ICC.

== Schedule ==
Date	Time	Opponent	Site	Result	Attendance	Source
September 22	7:30 p.m.	Evansville	Bearcat Stadium; Muncie, IN	L 21–35	3,800	
September 29		at Wabash*	Crawfordsville, IN	L 19–34		
October 6		at DePauw*	Greencastle, IN	L 7–14		
October 13		at Butler	Butler Bowl; Indianapolis, IN	L 14–20	3,000	
October 20		Indiana State^{†}	Ball State Field; Muncie, IN (Blue Key Victory Bell)	T 0–0	7,000	
October 26		Valparaiso	Ball State Field; Muncie, IN	L 12–34		
November 3		Saint Joseph's (IN)	Ball State Field; Muncie, IN	L 21–39		
*Non-conference game; ^{†}Homecoming; All times are in Central time
