= 1951 Western Kentucky Hilltoppers football team =

American college football season

1951 Western Kentucky Hilltoppers football
- Conference: Ohio Valley Conference
- Record: 4–5 (2–4 OVC)
- Head coach: Jack Clayton (4th season)
- Captain: Lawrence "Butch" Gilbert

1951 Ohio Valley Conference football standings
	Conf.					Overall
Team	W		L		T	W		L		T
Murray State $	5	–	1	–	0	8	–	1	–	0
Eastern Kentucky	4	–	2	–	0	7	–	3	–	0
Marshall	4	–	2	–	0	5	–	5	–	1
Evansville	3	–	3	–	0	5	–	5	–	0
Tennessee Tech	3	–	3	–	0	5	–	5	–	1
Western Kentucky	2	–	4	–	0	4	–	5	–	0
Morehead State	0	–	6	–	0	1	–	7	–	0
$ – Conference champion

The 1951 Western Kentucky Hilltoppers football team represented Western Kentucky State College (now known as Western Kentucky University) as a member of the Ohio Valley Conference (OVC) during the 1951 college football season. Led by fourth-year head coach Jack Clayton, the Hilltoppers compiled an overall record of 4–5 with a mark of 2–4 in conference play, placing sixth in the OVC. The team's captain was Lawrence "Butch" Gilbert.

== Schedule ==
Date	Time	Opponent	Site	Result	Attendance	Source
September 22		Bethel (TN)*	Bowling Green, KY	W 56–0		
September 29	7:30 p.m.	Evansville	Bowling Green, KY	W 41–7	3,500	
October 6		at Marshall	Huntington, WV	L 21–35		
October 13	7:30 p.m.	Morehead State	Bowling Green, KY	W 20–7		
October 20	2:00 p.m.	Tennessee Tech^{†}	Bowling Green, KY	L 7–14	4,500	
October 27		at Memphis State*	Crump Stadium; Memphis, TN	L 0–38		
November 3		Delta State*	Bowling Green, KY	W 46–6		
November 10		at Eastern Kentucky	Richmond, KY (rivalry)	L 7–31		
November 17		at Murray State	Cutchin Stadium; Murray, KY (rivalry)	L 6–23	4,000	
*Non-conference game; ^{†}Homecoming; All times are in Central time
