= 1951 Marshall Thundering Herd football team =

American college football season

1951 Marshall Thundering Herd football
- Conference: Ohio Valley Conference
- Record: 5–4–1 (4–2 OVC)
- Head coach: Pete Pederson (2nd season)
- Home stadium: Fairfield Stadium

1951 Ohio Valley Conference football standings
| | Conf. | | | | | Overall |
| Team | W | | L | | T | W | | L | | T |
|---|---|---|---|---|---|---|---|---|---|---|
| Murray State $ | 5 | – | 1 | – | 0 | 8 | – | 1 | – | 0 |
| Eastern Kentucky | 4 | – | 2 | – | 0 | 7 | – | 3 | – | 0 |
| Marshall | 4 | – | 2 | – | 0 | 5 | – | 5 | – | 1 |
| Evansville | 3 | – | 3 | – | 0 | 5 | – | 5 | – | 0 |
| Tennessee Tech | 3 | – | 3 | – | 0 | 5 | – | 5 | – | 1 |
| Western Kentucky | 2 | – | 4 | – | 0 | 4 | – | 5 | – | 0 |
| Morehead State | 0 | – | 6 | – | 0 | 1 | – | 7 | – | 0 |
$ – Conference champion

The 1951 Marshall Thundering Herd football team was an American football team that represented Marshall University in the Ohio Valley Conference (OVC) during the 1951 college football season. In its second season under head coach Pete Pederson, the team compiled a 5–4–1 record (4–2 against conference opponents) and outscored opponents by a total of 206 to 176. The team played its home games at Fairfield Stadium in Huntington, West Virginia.

== Schedule ==
| Date | Time | Opponent | Site | Result | Attendance | Source |
|---|---|---|---|---|---|---|
| September 15 | | vs. VPI* | Bluefield Municipal Stadium; Bluefield, WV | L 12–18 (exhibition) | 8,000 | |
| September 22 | | Morehead State | Fairfield Stadium; Huntington, WV | W 21–6 | | |
| September 29 | | at Eastern Kentucky | Hanger Stadium; Richmond, KY | L 6–13 | | |
| October 6 | | Western Kentucky | Fairfield Stadium; Huntington, WV | W 35–21 | | |
| October 13 | | Murray State | Fairfield Stadium; Huntington, WV | L 13–28 | 7,000 | |
| October 20 | | at Toledo* | Glass Bowl; Toledo, OH | L 14–32 | | |
| October 27 | | at Morris Harvey* | Laidley Field; Charleston, WV | W 19–0 | 9,000 | |
| November 3 | | at Tennessee Tech | Cookeville, TN | W 20–13 | | |
| November 9 | 8:00 p.m. | Evansville | Fairfield Stadium; Huntington, WV | W 52–13 | | |
| November 17 | | Dayton*^{†} | Fairfield Stadium; Huntington, WV | L 13–37 | | |
| November 22 | | Ohio* | Fairfield Stadium; Huntington, WV | T 13–13 | | |
*Non-conference game; ^{†}Homecoming; All times are in Eastern time
