= 1951 Kentucky Wildcats football team =

American college football season

1951 Kentucky Wildcats football

Cotton Bowl Classic champion

Cotton Bowl Classic, W 20–7 vs. TCU
- Conference: Southeastern Conference

Ranking
- Coaches: No. 17
- AP: No. 15
- Record: 8–4 (3–3 SEC)
- Head coach: Bear Bryant (6th season)
- Home stadium: McLean Stadium

1951 Southeastern Conference football standings
| | Conf. | | | | | Overall |
| Team | W | | L | | T | W | | L | | T |
|---|---|---|---|---|---|---|---|---|---|---|
| No. 5 Georgia Tech + | 7 | – | 0 | – | 0 | 11 | – | 0 | – | 1 |
| No. 1 Tennessee + | 5 | – | 0 | – | 0 | 10 | – | 1 | – | 0 |
| LSU | 4 | – | 2 | – | 1 | 7 | – | 3 | – | 1 |
| Ole Miss | 4 | – | 2 | – | 1 | 6 | – | 3 | – | 1 |
| No. 15 Kentucky | 3 | – | 3 | – | 0 | 8 | – | 4 | – | 0 |
| Auburn | 3 | – | 4 | – | 0 | 5 | – | 5 | – | 0 |
| Vanderbilt | 3 | – | 5 | – | 0 | 6 | – | 5 | – | 0 |
| Alabama | 3 | – | 5 | – | 0 | 5 | – | 6 | – | 0 |
| Florida | 2 | – | 4 | – | 0 | 5 | – | 5 | – | 0 |
| Georgia | 2 | – | 4 | – | 0 | 5 | – | 5 | – | 0 |
| Mississippi State | 2 | – | 5 | – | 0 | 4 | – | 5 | – | 0 |
| Tulane | 1 | – | 5 | – | 0 | 4 | – | 6 | – | 0 |
+ – Conference co-champions; Rankings from AP Poll

The 1951 Kentucky Wildcats football team represented the University of Kentucky during the 1951 college football season. The Wildcats scored 314 points while allowing 121 points. Ranked #6 in the AP Poll at the beginning of the season, the team finished the season with a victory in the 1952 Cotton Bowl Classic and a #15 AP ranking.

== Schedule ==
| Date | Time | Opponent | Rank | Site | Result | Attendance | Source |
|---|---|---|---|---|---|---|---|
| September 15 | 2:00 p.m. | Tennessee Tech* | No. 6 | McLean Stadium; Lexington, KY | W 72–13 | 26,000 | |
| September 22 | | at No. 11 Texas* | No. 6 | War Memorial Stadium; Austin, TX | L 6–7 | 47,000 | |
| September 29 | | at Ole Miss | No. 6 | Hemingway Stadium; Oxford, MS | L 17–21 | 20,000 | |
| October 6 | | No. 11 Georgia Tech | No. 17 | McLean Stadium; Lexington, KY | L 7–13 | 35,000 | |
| October 13 | | Mississippi State | | McLean Stadium; Lexington, KY | W 27–0 | | |
| October 20 | | No. 12 Villanova* | | McLean Stadium; Lexington, KY | W 35–13 | 35,000 | |
| October 27 | | at Florida | No. 17 | Florida Field; Gainesville, FL (rivalry) | W 14–6 | 31,000 | |
| November 3 | | No. 19 Miami (FL)*^{†} | No. 14 | McLean Stadium; Lexington, KY | W 32–0 | 28,000 | |
| November 10 | | at Tulane | No. 12 | Tulane Stadium; New Orleans, LA | W 37–0 | | |
| November 17 | | George Washington* | No. 9 | McLean Stadium; Lexington, KY | W 47–13 | 20,000 | |
| November 24 | | No. 1 Tennessee | No. 9 | McLean Stadium; Lexington, KY (rivalry) | L 0–28 | 36,000 | |
| January 1 | | vs. No. 11 TCU* | No. 17 | Cotton Bowl; Dallas, TX (Cotton Bowl) | W 20–7 | 75,349 | |
*Non-conference game; ^{†}Homecoming; Rankings from AP Poll released prior to the game; All times are in Central time

== Personnel ==
- QB Babe Parilli, Sr.

== Awards and honors ==
- Ray Correll, Guard, Cotton Bowl Classic co-Most Valuable Player
- Emery Clark, Halfback, Cotton Bowl Classic co-Most Valuable Player
- Babe Parilli, Quarterback, All-America selection
- Babe Parilli, Cotton Bowl Classic co-Most Valuable Player
- Doug Moseley, Center, All-America selection

== Team players drafted into the NFL ==
| Player | Position | Round | Pick | NFL club |
|---|---|---|---|---|
| Babe Parilli | Quarterback | 1 | 4 | Green Bay Packers |
| Jim MacKenzie | Tackle | 6 | 71 | New York Giants |
| Ed Hamilton | End | 13 | 149 | Philadelphia Eagles |
| John Griggs | Center | 17 | 205 | Los Angeles Rams |
| Frank Fuller | Tackle | 26 | 313 | Los Angeles Rams |
| Doug Moseley | Center | 28 | 326 | New York Yanks |
