= 1951 Evansville Purple Aces football team =

American college football season

1951 Evansville Purple Aces football
- Conference: Indiana Collegiate Conference, Ohio Valley Conference
- Record: 5–5 (1–1 ICC, 3–3 OVC)
- Head coach: Don Ping (6th season)
- Home stadium: Reitz Bowl

1951 Indiana Collegiate Conference football standings
	Conf.					Overall
Team	W		L		T	W		L		T
Valparaiso $	4	–	0	–	0	9	–	0	–	0
Saint Joseph's (IN)	3	–	1	–	0	4	–	4	–	0
Butler	3	–	2	–	0	4	–	4	–	1
Evansville	1	–	1	–	0	5	–	5	–	0
Indiana State	0	–	3	–	1	0	–	6	–	1
Ball State	0	–	4	–	1	0	–	6	–	1
$ – Conference champion

1951 Ohio Valley Conference football standings
	Conf.					Overall
Team	W		L		T	W		L		T
Murray State $	5	–	1	–	0	8	–	1	–	0
Eastern Kentucky	4	–	2	–	0	7	–	3	–	0
Marshall	4	–	2	–	0	5	–	5	–	1
Evansville	3	–	3	–	0	5	–	5	–	0
Tennessee Tech	3	–	3	–	0	5	–	5	–	1
Western Kentucky	2	–	4	–	0	4	–	5	–	0
Morehead State	0	–	6	–	0	1	–	7	–	0
$ – Conference champion

The 1951 Evansville Purple Aces football team represented Evansville College—now known as the University of Evansville—as a member of the Indiana Collegiate Conference (ICC) and the Ohio Valley Conference (OVC) during the 1951 college football season. Led by sixth-year head coach Don Ping, the Purple Aces compiled an overall record of 5–5 with marks 1–1 against ICC opponents, placing fourth, and 3–3 in OVC play, tying for fourth place.

== Schedule ==
Date	Time	Opponent	Site	Result	Attendance	Source
September 15	8:00 p.m.	Morehead State	Reitz Bowl; Evansville, IN	W 33–6	7,000	
September 22	7:30 p.m.	at Ball State	Bearcat Stadium; Muncie, IN	W 35–21	3,800	
September 29	7:30 p.m.	at Western Kentucky	Bowling Green, KY	L 7–41	3,500	
October 5	8:00 p.m.	at Chattanooga*	Chamberlain Field; Chattanooga, TN	L 7–75	8,500	
October 13	8:00 p.m.	Quincy*	Reitz Bowl; Evansville, IN	W 18–14	4,000	
October 20	8:00 p.m.	Murray State	Reitz Bowl; Evansville, IN	W 14–13	400	
October 27	2:00 p.m.	at Butler	Butler Bowl; Indianapolis, IN	L 12–27	1,500	
November 3	2:00 p.m.	Eastern Kentucky	Reitz Bowl; Evansville, IN	W 7–6	2,000	
November 9	7:00 p.m.	at Marshall	Fairfield Stadium; Huntington, WV	L 13–52		
November 17	8:00 p.m.	at Tennessee Tech	Cookeville TN	L 13–38	1,000	
*Non-conference game; All times are in Central time
