= 1951 Valparaiso Crusaders football team =

American college football season

1951 Valparaiso Crusaders football

ICC champion
- Conference: Indiana Collegiate Conference
- Record: 9–0 (4–0 ICC)
- Head coach: Emory Bauer (6th season)

1951 Indiana Collegiate Conference football standings
	Conf.					Overall
Team	W		L		T	W		L		T
Valparaiso $	4	–	0	–	0	9	–	0	–	0
Saint Joseph's (IN)	3	–	1	–	0	4	–	4	–	0
Butler	3	–	2	–	0	4	–	4	–	1
Evansville	1	–	1	–	0	5	–	5	–	0
Indiana State	0	–	3	–	1	0	–	6	–	1
Ball State	0	–	4	–	1	0	–	6	–	1
$ – Conference champion

The 1951 Valparaiso Crusaders football team was an American football team that represented Valparaiso University as a member of the Indiana Collegiate Conference (ICC) during the 1951 college football season. Led by sixth-year head coach Emory Bauer, the Crusaders compiled an overall record of 9–0 with a mark of 4–0 in conference play, winning the ICC title.

== Schedule ==
Date	Opponent	Site	Result	Attendance	Source
September 22	at Butler	Butler Bowl; Indianapolis, IN (rivalry)	W 41–7	4,000	
September 29	Indiana State	Boucher Field; Valparaiso, IN	W 46–7		
October 6	at Saint Joseph's (IN)	Rensselaer, IN	W 32–3		
October 13	vs. Augustana (IL)*	Lutheran High School stadium; Chicago, IL	W 34–13	4,500	
October 20	Carroll (WI)*	Valparaiso, IN	W 34–7		
October 26	at Ball State	Ball State Field; Muncie, IN	W 34–12		
November 3	Luther*	Valparaiso, IN	W 33–7		
November 10	Wheaton (IL)*	Valparaiso, IN	W 20–6		
November 16	at Hillsdale*	Hillsdale, MI	W 54–0		
*Non-conference game
