= 1951 Auburn Tigers football team =

American college football season

1951 Auburn Tigers football
- Conference: Southeastern Conference
- Record: 5–5 (3–4 SEC)
- Head coach: Ralph Jordan (1st season)
- Home stadium: Cliff Hare Stadium; Cramton Bowl; Ladd Memorial Stadium

1951 Southeastern Conference football standings
	Conf.					Overall
Team	W		L		T	W		L		T
No. 5 Georgia Tech +	7	–	0	–	0	11	–	0	–	1
No. 1 Tennessee +	5	–	0	–	0	10	–	1	–	0
LSU	4	–	2	–	1	7	–	3	–	1
Ole Miss	4	–	2	–	1	6	–	3	–	1
No. 15 Kentucky	3	–	3	–	0	8	–	4	–	0
Auburn	3	–	4	–	0	5	–	5	–	0
Vanderbilt	3	–	5	–	0	6	–	5	–	0
Alabama	3	–	5	–	0	5	–	6	–	0
Florida	2	–	4	–	0	5	–	5	–	0
Georgia	2	–	4	–	0	5	–	5	–	0
Mississippi State	2	–	5	–	0	4	–	5	–	0
Tulane	1	–	5	–	0	4	–	6	–	0
+ – Conference co-champions; Rankings from AP Poll

The 1951 Auburn Tigers football team represented Auburn University in the 1951 college football season. It was the Tigers' 60th overall and 19th season as a member of the Southeastern Conference (SEC). The team was led by head coach Ralph "Shug" Jordan, in his first year, and played their home games at Cliff Hare Stadium in Auburn, Cramton Bowl in Montgomery and Ladd Memorial Stadium in Mobile, Alabama. They finished with a record of five wins and five losses (5–5 overall, 3–4 in the SEC). The team was ranked at No. 73 in the 1951 Litkenhous Ratings.

== Schedule ==
Date	Opponent	Site	Result	Source
September 29	Vanderbilt	Cliff Hare Stadium; Auburn, AL	W 24–14	
October 5	Wofford*	Cramton Bowl; Montgomery, AL	W 30–14	
October 13	Florida^{†}	Cliff Hare Stadium; Auburn, AL (rivalry)	W 14–13	
October 20	at No. 5 Georgia Tech	Grant Field; Atlanta, GA (rivalry)	L 7–27	
October 27	at Tulane	Tulane Stadium; New Orleans, LA (rivalry)	W 21–0	
November 3	Louisiana College*	Cliff Hare Stadium; Auburn, AL	W 49–0	
November 10	Ole Miss	Ladd Memorial Stadium; Mobile, AL (rivalry)	L 14–39	
November 17	vs. Georgia	Memorial Stadium; Columbus, GA (rivalry)	L 14–46	
November 24	at Clemson*	Memorial Stadium; Clemson, SC (rivalry)	L 0–34	
December 1	vs. Alabama	Legion Field; Birmingham, AL (Iron Bowl)	L 7–25	
*Non-conference game; ^{†}Homecoming; Rankings from AP Poll released prior to the game

== Roster ==
- Vince Dooley
