= 1951 Vanderbilt Commodores football team =

American college football season

1951 Vanderbilt Commodores football
- Conference: Southeastern Conference
- Record: 6–5 (3–5 SEC)
- Head coach: Bill Edwards (3rd season)
- Offensive scheme: T formation
- Captain: Bob Werckle
- Home stadium: Dudley Field

1951 Southeastern Conference football standings
	Conf.					Overall
Team	W		L		T	W		L		T
No. 5 Georgia Tech +	7	–	0	–	0	11	–	0	–	1
No. 1 Tennessee +	5	–	0	–	0	10	–	1	–	0
LSU	4	–	2	–	1	7	–	3	–	1
Ole Miss	4	–	2	–	1	6	–	3	–	1
No. 15 Kentucky	3	–	3	–	0	8	–	4	–	0
Auburn	3	–	4	–	0	5	–	5	–	0
Vanderbilt	3	–	5	–	0	6	–	5	–	0
Alabama	3	–	5	–	0	5	–	6	–	0
Florida	2	–	4	–	0	5	–	5	–	0
Georgia	2	–	4	–	0	5	–	5	–	0
Mississippi State	2	–	5	–	0	4	–	5	–	0
Tulane	1	–	5	–	0	4	–	6	–	0
+ – Conference co-champions; Rankings from AP Poll

The 1951 Vanderbilt Commodores football team represented Vanderbilt University during the 1951 college football season. The team's head coach was Bill Edwards, who was in his third season as the Commodores' head coach. Members of the Southeastern Conference, the Commodores played their home games at Dudley Field in Nashville, Tennessee.

== Schedule ==
Date	Opponent	Site	Result	Attendance	Source
September 22	Middle Tennessee*	Dudley Field; Nashville, TN	W 22–7		
September 29	at Auburn	Cliff Hare Stadium; Auburn, AL	L 14–24		
October 6	Alabama	Dudley Field; Nashville, TN	W 22–20	25,000	
October 13	vs. Ole Miss	Crump Stadium; Memphis, TN (rivalry)	W 34–20		
October 20	Florida	Florida Field; Gainesville, FL	L 13–33		
October 27	No. 3 Georgia Tech	Dudley Field; Nashville, TN (rivalry)	L 7–8	26,000	
November 3	Chattanooga*	Dudley Field; Nashville, TN	W 19–14		
November 10	at LSU	Tiger Stadium; Baton Rouge, LA	W 20–13	18,000	
November 17	Tulane	Dudley Field; Nashville, TN	L 10–14	17,000	
November 24	Memphis State*	Dudley Field; Nashville, TN	W 13–7	4,000	
December 1	at Tennessee	Shields–Watkins Field; Knoxville, TN (rivalry)	L 27–35	45,000	
*Non-conference game; Rankings from AP Poll released prior to the game
