= 1951 Ole Miss Rebels football team =

American college football season

1951 Ole Miss Rebels football
- Conference: Southeastern Conference
- Record: 6–3–1 (4–2–1 SEC)
- Head coach: Johnny Vaught (5th season)
- Captain: Othar Crawford
- Home stadium: Hemingway Stadium

1951 Southeastern Conference football standings
	Conf.					Overall
Team	W		L		T	W		L		T
No. 5 Georgia Tech +	7	–	0	–	0	11	–	0	–	1
No. 1 Tennessee +	5	–	0	–	0	10	–	1	–	0
LSU	4	–	2	–	1	7	–	3	–	1
Ole Miss	4	–	2	–	1	6	–	3	–	1
No. 15 Kentucky	3	–	3	–	0	8	–	4	–	0
Auburn	3	–	4	–	0	5	–	5	–	0
Vanderbilt	3	–	5	–	0	6	–	5	–	0
Alabama	3	–	5	–	0	5	–	6	–	0
Florida	2	–	4	–	0	5	–	5	–	0
Georgia	2	–	4	–	0	5	–	5	–	0
Mississippi State	2	–	5	–	0	4	–	5	–	0
Tulane	1	–	5	–	0	4	–	6	–	0
+ – Conference co-champions; Rankings from AP Poll

The 1951 Ole Miss Rebels football team represented the University of Mississippi as a member of the Southeastern Conference (SEC) during the 1951 college football season. Led by fifth -year head coach, the Rebels compiled an overall record of 6–3–1 with a mark of 4–2–1 in conference play, tying for third place in the SEC. Ole Miss played home games at Hemingway Stadium in Oxford, Mississippi.

== Schedule ==
Date	Time	Opponent	Site	Result	Attendance	Source
September 21	night	at Memphis State*	Crump Stadium; Memphis, TN (rivalry)	W 32–0		
September 29		No. 6 Kentucky	Hemingway Stadium; Oxford, MS	W 21–17	20,000	
October 5	night	Boston College*	Crump Stadium; Memphis, TN	W 34–7	9,000	
October 13		vs. Vanderbilt	Crump Stadium; Memphis, TN (rivalry)	L 20–34		
October 20		Tulane^{†}	Hemingway Stadium; Oxford, MS (rivalry)	W 25–6	17,000	
October 26	night	at Miami (FL)*	Burdine Stadium; Miami, FL	L 7–20		
November 3	night	at LSU	Tiger Stadium; Baton Rouge, LA (rivalry)	T 6–6		
November 10		at Auburn	Ladd Memorial Stadium; Mobile, AL (rivalry)	W 39–14		
November 17		No. 2 Tennessee	Hemingway Stadium; Oxford, MS (rivalry)	L 21–46	32,000	
December 1		at Mississippi State	Scott Field; Starkville, MS (Egg Bowl)	W 49–7		
*Non-conference game; ^{†}Homecoming; Rankings from AP Poll released prior to the game

== Roster ==
- FB Arnold Boykin
- QB Rocky Byrd
- QB Jimmy Lear
