= Ellis T. Johnson =

American football player and coach (1910–1990)

Biographical details
- Born: August 8, 1910; Morehead, Kentucky, U.S.
- Died: August 5, 1990 (aged 79); Huntington, West Virginia, U.S.

Playing career

Football
- 1930–1932: Kentucky

Basketball
- 1930–1933: Kentucky

Baseball
- 1931: Kentucky

Coaching career (HC unless noted)

Football
- 1936–1952: Morehead State

Basketball
- 1936–1943: Morehead State
- 1947–1952: Morehead State
- 1963–1969: Marshall

Baseball
- 1941: Morehead State

Administrative career (AD unless noted)
- 1936–1953: Morehead State

Head coaching record
- Overall: 54–44–10 (football); 252–247 (basketball)

Ellis T. Johnson (August 8, 1910 – August 5, 1990) was an American football, basketball, baseball, and track and field player and coach. He was a four-sport letter-winner at the University of Kentucky, playing basketball, football, baseball, and track and field. In 1933 he became Adolph Rupp's first All-American at Kentucky.

Johnson was the head coach of Morehead State University men's basketball, football, baseball, and track. He is Morehead's all-time winningest coach in football, with a 54–44–10 mark, and in basketball, where his teams went 176–158. Johnson also served as men's basketball head coach at Marshall University.

== Head coaching record ==
=== Football ===
Year	Team	Overall	Conference	Standing
Morehead State Eagles (Southern Intercollegiate Athletic Association) (1936–1941)
1936	Morehead State	4–1–2	4–1–2	10th
1937	Morehead State	7–1	4–1	7th
1938	Morehead State	5–1–1	2–1–1	13th
1939	Morehead State	6–2	2–2	14th
1940	Morehead State	3–2–2	1–1–2	T–17th
1941	Morehead State	3–4	0–3	30th
Morehead State Eagles (Independent) (1942–1947)
1942	Morehead State	4–1–2		
1943	No team—World War II			
1944	No team—World War II			
1945	No team—World War II			
1946	Morehead State	6–1		
1947	Morehead State	1–6–2		
Morehead State Eagles (Ohio Valley Conference) (1948–1952)
1948	Morehead State	3–5	0–3	6th
1949	Morehead State	6–3	3–3	4th
1950	Morehead State	4–4	3–3	4th
1951	Morehead State	1–7	0–6	7th
1952	Morehead State	1–6–1	0–4–1	6th
Morehead State:		54–44–10	19–28–6	
Total:		54–44–10		

=== Basketball ===
Record table
Season	Team	Overall	Conference	Standing	Postseason
Morehead State Eagles (Kentucky Intercollegiate Athletic Conference) (1936–1943)
1936–37	Morehead State	14–3			
1937–38	Morehead State	6–11			
1938–39	Morehead State	16–8			
1939–40	Morehead State	7–14			
1940–41	Morehead State	11–7			
1941–42	Morehead State	12–10			
1942–43	Morehead State	12–7			
Morehead State Eagles (Kentucky Intercollegiate Athletic Conference) (1945–1948)
1945–46	Morehead State	13–8			
1946–47	Morehead State	11–16			
1947–48	Morehead State	10–17			
Morehead State Eagles (Ohio Valley Conference) (1948–1953)
1948–49	Morehead State	14–9	2–7	7th	
1940–50	Morehead State	12–10	5–6	4th	
1950–51	Morehead State	14–12	4–7	5th	
1951–52	Morehead State	11–14	3–9	5th	
1952–53	Morehead State	13–12	3–7	T–4th	
Morehead State:		176–158 (.527)			
Marshall Thundering Herd (Mid-American Conference) (1963–1969)
1963–64	Marshall	6–17	1–11	7th	
1964–65	Marshall	4–20	1–11	7th	
1965–66	Marshall	12–12	4–8	T–5th	
1966–67	Marshall	20–8	10–2	2nd	NIT Fourth Place
1967–68	Marshall	17–8	9–3	2nd	NIT First Round
1968–69	Marshall	9–15	3–9	T–6th	
Marshall:		68–80 (.459)	28–44 (.389)		
Total:		244–238 (.506)			
