= 1951 Tennessee Volunteers football team =

American college football season

1951 Tennessee Volunteers football

Consensus national champion SEC co-champion

Sugar Bowl, L 13–28 vs. Maryland
- Conference: Southeastern Conference

Ranking
- Coaches: No. 1
- AP: No. 1
- Record: 10–1 (5–0 SEC)
- Head coach: Robert Neyland (20th season)
- Offensive scheme: Single-wing
- Base defense: Multiple
- Home stadium: Shields–Watkins Field

1951 Southeastern Conference football standings
	Conf.					Overall
Team	W		L		T	W		L		T
No. 5 Georgia Tech +	7	–	0	–	0	11	–	0	–	1
No. 1 Tennessee +	5	–	0	–	0	10	–	1	–	0
LSU	4	–	2	–	1	7	–	3	–	1
Ole Miss	4	–	2	–	1	6	–	3	–	1
No. 15 Kentucky	3	–	3	–	0	8	–	4	–	0
Auburn	3	–	4	–	0	5	–	5	–	0
Vanderbilt	3	–	5	–	0	6	–	5	–	0
Alabama	3	–	5	–	0	5	–	6	–	0
Florida	2	–	4	–	0	5	–	5	–	0
Georgia	2	–	4	–	0	5	–	5	–	0
Mississippi State	2	–	5	–	0	4	–	5	–	0
Tulane	1	–	5	–	0	4	–	6	–	0
+ – Conference co-champions; Rankings from AP Poll

The 1951 Tennessee Volunteers football team represented the University of Tennessee in the 1951 college football season. In his next to last season as head coach, Robert Neyland led the Vols to their second consecutive national title and the fourth during his tenure. The 1951 title was also the first undisputed, at the time, national title in school history. Maryland has since been retroactively credited with the 1951 national championship by several selectors, including analyst Jeff Sagarin, as they went undefeated that year and beat Tennessee in the Sugar Bowl. At the time, the AP awarded the title before the bowl games were played. 1951 was also Neyland's ninth undefeated regular season in his career. The 1950 Tennessee team had gone 11–1, winning its last nine games and capping the season off with a victory over Texas in the Cotton Bowl. In 1951, The Vols put together a 10–0 regular season and were voted national champs by the AP Poll before the bowl season began, as was the convention at the time. In addition to AP, Tennessee was named national champion by NCAA-designated major selectors Litkenhous, United Press International (coaches poll), and Williamson, leading to a consensus national champion designation.

The game against Alabama on the Third Saturday in October that season was the first ever nationally televised game for both teams. The Vols were a dominant team in the regular season, winning their first nine games by a combined score of 338 to 61 before thwarting a spirited effort by in-state rival Vanderbilt in the last game of the regular season, 35–27.

== Prominent players ==
The 1951 Tennessee Volunteers featured Hank Lauricella, that season's Heisman Trophy runner up, and Doug Atkins, a future member of both the College Football Hall of Fame and the Pro Football Hall of Fame. James Haslam Jr., a future business and civic leader in Knoxville, was a captain on the 1952 team, and a prominent member of the 1951 squad. The team featured six all-conference players: Lauricella, Atkins, Ted Daffer, John Michaels, Bill Pearman, and Bert Rechichar. Laricella, Daffer, and Pearman were also named All-Americans following the year.

== Schedule ==
Date	Time	Opponent	Rank	Site	TV	Result	Attendance	Source
September 29		Mississippi State	No. 1	Shields–Watkins Field; Knoxville, TN		W 14–0	35,000	
October 6		No. 16 Duke*	No. 3	Shields–Watkins Field; Knoxville, TN		W 26–0	45,000	
October 13		Chattanooga*	No. 3	Shields–Watkins Field; Knoxville, TN		W 42–13	15,000	
October 20		at Alabama	No. 2	Legion Field; Birmingham, AL (Third Saturday in October)	CBS	W 27–13	44,000	
October 27	2:00 p.m.	Tennessee Tech*	No. 1	Shields–Watkins Field; Knoxville, TN		W 68–0		
November 3		at North Carolina*	No. 1	Kenan Memorial Stadium; Chapel Hill, NC		W 27–0	41,000	
November 10		Washington and Lee*	No. 1	Shields–Watkins Field; Knoxville, TN		W 60–14	20,000	
November 17		at Ole Miss	No. 2	Hemingway Stadium; Oxford, MS (rivalry)		W 46–21	32,000	
November 24		at No. 9 Kentucky	No. 1	McLean Stadium; Lexington, KY (rivalry)		W 28–0	36,000	
December 1		Vanderbilt^{†}	No. 1	Shields–Watkins Field; Knoxville, TN (rivalry)		W 35–27	45,000	
January 1		vs. No. 3 Maryland*	No. 1	Tulane Stadium; New Orleans, LA (Sugar Bowl)		L 13–28	82,271	
*Non-conference game; ^{†}Homecoming; Rankings from AP Poll released prior to the game; All times are in Central time
