= Bert Rechichar =

American football player (1930–2019)

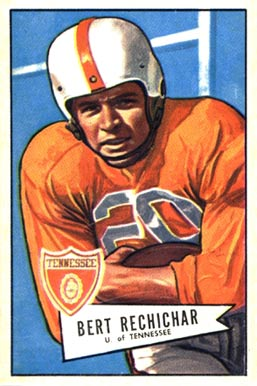
- 1952 Bowman football card

No. 15, 44
- Positions: Defensive back, linebacker, halfback, placekicker

Personal information
- Born: July 16, 1930; Belle Vernon, Pennsylvania, U.S.
- Died: July 19, 2019 (aged 89); Belle Vernon, Pennsylvania, U.S.
- Listed height: 6 ft 1 in (1.85 m)
- Listed weight: 209 lb (95 kg)

Career information
- High school: Rostraver (Rostraver Township, Pennsylvania)
- College: Tennessee (1948–1951)
- NFL draft: 1952: 1st round, 10th overall pick

Career history
- Cleveland Browns (1952); Baltimore Colts (1953–1959); Pittsburgh Steelers (1960); New York Titans (1961)

Awards and highlights
- 2× NFL champion (1958, 1959); 2× Second-team All-Pro (1953, 1955); 3× Pro Bowl (1955-1957); National champion (1951); Second-team All-SEC (1951)

Career NFL statistics
- Field goals made: 31
- Field goal attempts: 88
- Field goal %: 35.2
- Interceptions: 31
- Fumble recoveries: 9
- Total touchdowns: 4
- Stats at Pro Football Reference

Albert Daniel Rechichar (/ˈrɛtʃɪtʃɑːr/ RETCH-ih-char; July 16, 1930 – July 19, 2019) was an American professional football player who was a defensive back, halfback, and kicker in the National Football League (NFL). He played college football for the Tennessee Volunteers, whom he captained during their 1951 national championship season. His performance over his last two seasons led Volunteers head coach Bob Neyland to proclaim Rechichar "probably the best all-around player in Tennessee football history."

Selected in the first round of the 1952 NFL draft, Rechichar had a 10 year career in professional football playing for the Cleveland Browns, Baltimore Colts, and Pittsburgh Steelers of the NFL and the New York Titans of the AFL.

While playing for the Colts in 1953, Rechichar kicked a successful 56-yard field goal, setting an NFL distance record that stood for 17 years. He was selected for the NFL Pro Bowl three times.

== Biography ==
=== Early life ===
Bert Rechichar was born on July 16, 1930, in Belle Vernon, Pennsylvania, the youngest of ten children.

He attended Rostraver High School in Rostraver Township, Pennsylvania, for whom he played football in his sophomore, junior, and senior seasons — playing halfback on offense and safety on defense. Playing both sides of the ball was not uncommon in this era of the single platoon system and limited substitution, although Rechichar was unusual in playing all 60 minutes of the game without respite. "I'd lose 17, 18, 20 pounds a game," Rechichar recalled decades later.

He moved to fullback in 1947, his final year of high school, and distinguished himself as a difficult-to-tackle runner, scoring four touchdowns in one contest against California High School of neighboring California, Pennsylvania.

=== College football career ===
In 1948, Rechichar enrolled at the University of Tennessee — a school which was segregated by law until 1960. He played varsity football for the Volunteers from 1949 to 1951 (freshmen being prohibited from varsity play due to NCAA rules).

The Nashville Tennessean was effusive in its praise of the 19-year old Rechichar ahead of the 1949 season, listing him as a "wingback" (flanker) and declaring him "tops on the squad" as a pass receiver, a "hard, fast, and shifty" runner, and "probably the best kick-off and extra point man the Vols have had in a decade."

His performance as a defender was judged even more highly, with the Tennessean declaring, "where this boy really shines is on defense — he is a rocking sure tackler and covers passes like a vet." The paper called him a "standout" of spring practice.

In his a senior of 1951, Rechichar was elected captain by his teammates. In the 1951 season he would be the only Tennessee player used on both sides of the ball by head coach Bob Neyland, playing as a wingback (flanker) on the offense and as a safety on defense.

Rechichar helped the Volunteers go 10–0, en route to a New Year's Day matchup with undefeated Maryland in the 1952 Sugar Bowl. Entering the game ranked #1 in the Associated Press coaches' poll, the Volunteers lost to the third-ranked Terripins by a score of 28–13, thereby ending their quest for an undisputed national title. Rechichar scored a touchdown in garbage time of the fourth quarter on a 5-yard pass from reserve quarterback Harold Payne, inserted into the game to replace ineffective All-American Hank Lauricella.

Despite a divided claim to the national title following the Sugar Bowl loss, the 1951 season was wildly successful for Tennessee, with Bert Rechichar's stellar play both offensively and defensively frequently noted as the linchpin of the team's success. Vols head coach Bob Neyland proclaimed Rechichar "the best since Bob Foxx, and probably the best all-around player in Tennessee football history."

=== Baseball career ===
Rechichar was also an outfielder on the Tennessee Volunteers baseball team, helping the advance to the final game of the 1951 College World Series — a contest ultimately won by Oklahoma, 3–2. He was named a member of the All-Southeast Conference team as an outfielder at the end of the 1951 season.

He won a second letter for baseball for the Volunteers in the 1952 season, playing center field and leading the team in home runs.

At the end of the 1952 college baseball season Rechichar signed a contract with the Cleveland Indians and was assigned to their farm system, beginning with the Reading Indians of the Class A Eastern League. According to Mike McNally, director of the Indians' farm system, by the time Rechichar joined the team the club's lineup was already set so he was used infrequently and "did not get a thorough trial." Rechichar was consequently invited by the Indians to their spring training tryouts in Daytona Beach, Florida for a better look.

After spring training the outfielder Rechichar was again assigned to Reading for the 1953 season. He was subsequently sent down to the Spartanburg Peaches of the Class B Tri-State League after hitting just .175 in his first 10 games. Still faring poorly with the bat, Rechichar was released by Spartanburg late in June. He was picked up by the Rock Hill Chiefs of the same league and immediately marched out to test his mettle as a pitcher against his former team. A 12–2 shellacking followed and an immediate release from the team, thus ending Rechichar's baseball career.

=== Professional football career ===
"Number 44" in the blue-and-white of the Baltimore Colts ahead of the 1954 season.

Rechichar was selected in the first round of the 1952 NFL draft by the Cleveland Browns, that year's tenth overall selection. The Browns obtained the pick used to select Rechichar in a trade with the Detroit Lions.

Rechichar was chosen for the annual college all-star game, held in Chicago on August 15, 1952 — a game won by the NFL champion Los Angeles Rams. Unfortunately Rechichar's nose was broken on his first play in the game and he went to training camp with two black eyes for his trouble.

Browns defensive back Cliff Lewis quit football after the 1951 season, opening up the starting position at safety and a path for Rechichar to immediately be inserted in the lineup. Future Hall of Fame head coach Paul Brown was immediately won over by Rechichar's defensive prowess. After giving him extensive work in practice, Brown observed that Rechichar had quick reactions and recovered from mistakes quickly. "It's very evident Bert has had a lot of experience back there," Brown said.

Rechichar would start all 12 games at safety for the Browns in 1952, coming up with 6 interceptions and a fumble recovery.

On March 25, 1953, Rechichar was involved in a massive 15 player trade with the Baltimore Colts — a straight 10-for-5 swap of contracts in which no additional money changed hands. Joining Rechichar in making the move from the mighty Browns to the expansion Colts were such future starters as defensive backs Don Shula and Carl Taseff, end Art Spinney, as well as veteran guard Ed Sharkey. Going to Cleveland were four offensive linemen and halfback John Petitbon — three of whom were currently in the uniform of the United States armed forces. The one-sided deal went far towards putting the new Baltimore franchise on the NFL map.

==== The Kick ====
Bert Rechichar connects on his NFL record-breaking 56-yard field goal, September 27, 1953.

As time was running out in the first half of the season opener for the 1953 Colts, regular kicker Buck McPhail lined up for what would have been a miraculous, record-setting 56-yard field goal. Colts assistant coach Otis Douglas suddenly remembered the powerful leg that Rechichar had shown in practice and hastily pulled McPhail from the game. Rechichar rushed into the game and, wearing a regular, soft-toed football shoe rather than a square-toed kicking shoe, delivered a low line-drive that not only cleared the crossbar at the goal line, but sailed out of the end zone. The home crowd erupted.

Rechichar's blast broke the previous record of 54 yards held by Glenn Presnell of the Detroit Lions since 1934. According to observers, the ball was placed barely outside the 55 yard line for the record-setting kick, but official scorer Mel Schilling ruled it a 56-yarder and as such it entered the NFL record books. Rechichar also intercepted a pass and ran it back for what would be his only NFL touchdown in the Colts 13–9 victory over the visiting Chicago Bears.

The record-setting kick was Rechichar's first field goal attempt as a professional. It was a record that would stand until Tom Dempsey of the New Orleans Saints booted a 63-yarder in 1970.

Throughout his time with the Colts, Rechichar would be a useful utility player, first as a starting defensive back, kicker, and punter, and later filling in as a reserve linebacker, offensive end, and occasional fullback.

==== Trade to Pittsburgh ====
As he aged and his speed declined, Rechichar's playing opportunities with the ascending Colts diminished and his dissatisfaction grew. A knee injury suffered in the 1959 season required surgical repair, increasing the possibility that he would not make Baltimore's 1960 roster. In response, Colts general manager Don "Red" Kellett sought a trade for his unhappy veteran in July, just ahead of the opening of training camp in Westminster, Maryland. Rechichar was dealt to the Pittsburgh Steelers in exchange for an undisclosed future draft pick.

The trade to Pittsburgh moved Rechichar closer to his home in Belle Vernon, Pennsylvania for his tenth season in the NFL. The 30-year old would again be plagued by injury, this time a torn leg muscle that ended his season in November after seeing action in just six games. He would be waived by the Steelers in July 1961, ahead of the team's training camp for their 1961 season.

==== New York Titans ====
Rechichar would not be unemployed long, hooking up with the New York Titans of the rival American Football League (AFL) on July 18. Rechichar was added to the Titans' coaching staff as well with a player-coach contract inked in August. Rechichar would ultimately only see game action in two contests for the Titans, a franchise which would change its name in 1964 to the New York Jets.

Rechichar played a total of 99 professional football games, starting in 67. He finished his career with 31 interceptions and 9 fumble recoveries. As a kicker he hit 31 of 88 field goal attempts (35.2%) as well as 62 of 68 extra point tries. He also punted 38 times for the Colts with an average of 37.7 yards per kick and a career long of 56 yards.

=== Life after football ===
After his playing career, Rechichar tried his hand at coaching, spending 1964 as coach of the Knoxville Bears of the North American Football League.

=== Death and legacy ===
Rechichar had two sons and a daughter.

He died at age 89 in his hometown of Belle Vernon, Pennsylvania, from various ailments, including Alzheimer's.

Rechichar is best remembered as one of the best distance placekickers of his day, and not only for the 56-yard kick of 1953 that would stand as an NFL record for 17 years. He was selected to the NFL Pro Bowl three times, particularly distinguishing himself in his third and final appearance in 1957, when he hit field goals from 41, 42, 44, and 52 yards — regarded as remarkable for distance and accuracy in the era before "soccer-style" kicking came to the fore.

Rechichar is also remembered as one of the fiercest competitors in Colts history — "an old school tough guy." When Detroit's Howard "Hopalong" Cassady, a rookie in 1956, once complained to a referee that Rechichar had scratched him while making a particularly rough tackle, Rechichar memorably replied, "Kid, this is the pros, this isn't Ohio State — and we don't scratch up here. We just tear your eyeballs out."
