= 1951 Morehead State Eagles football team =

American college football season

1951 Morehead State Eagles football
- Conference: Ohio Valley Conference
- Record: 1–7 (0–6 OVC)
- Head coach: Ellis T. Johnson (13th season)

1951 Ohio Valley Conference football standings
	Conf.					Overall
Team	W		L		T	W		L		T
Murray State $	5	–	1	–	0	8	–	1	–	0
Eastern Kentucky	4	–	2	–	0	7	–	3	–	0
Marshall	4	–	2	–	0	5	–	5	–	1
Evansville	3	–	3	–	0	5	–	5	–	0
Tennessee Tech	3	–	3	–	0	5	–	5	–	1
Western Kentucky	2	–	4	–	0	4	–	5	–	0
Morehead State	0	–	6	–	0	1	–	7	–	0
$ – Conference champion

The 1951 Morehead State Eagles football team was an American football team that represented Morehead State College—now known as Morehead State University—as a member of the Ohio Valley Conference (OVC) during the 1951 college football season. Led by 13th-year head coach Ellis T. Johnson, the Eagles compiled an overall record of 1–7 with a mark of 0–6 in conference play, placing last out of seven teams in the OVC.

== Schedule ==
Date	Time	Opponent	Site	Result	Attendance	Source
September 15	9:00 p.m.	at Evansville	Reitz Bowl; Evansville, IN	L 6–33	7,000	
September 22		at Marshall	Fairfield Stadium; Huntington, WV	L 6–21		
September 29		East Tennessee State*	Morehead, KY	W 14–0		
October 6		Tennessee Tech	Morehead, KY	L 14–17		
October 13	8:30 p.m.	at Western Kentucky	Bowling Green, KY	L 7–20		
October 20		Middle Tennessee*	Morehead, KY	L 13–33		
October 27	7:30 p.m.	at Eastern Kentucky	Hanger Stadium; Richmond, KY (Old Hawg Rifle)	L 0–6		
November 3		Murray State^{†}	Morehead, KY	L 0–14	2,800	
*Non-conference game; ^{†}Homecoming; All times are in Eastern time
