= 1951 Middle Tennessee Blue Raiders football team =

American college football season

1951 Middle Tennessee Blue Raiders football

VSAC champion
- Conference: Volunteer State Athletic Conference
- Record: 7–2–2 (3–0 VSAC)
- Head coach: Charles M. Murphy (5th season)
- Captains: C. Lyons; M. Runion
- Home stadium: Horace Jones Field

The 1951 Middle Tennessee Blue Raiders football team represented the Middle Tennessee State College—now known as Middle Tennessee State University—as a member of the Volunteer State Athletic Conference (VSAC) during the 1951 college football season. Led by fifth-year head coach Charles M. Murphy, the Blue Raiders compiled a record an overall record of 7–2–2 with a mark of 3–0 in conference play, winning the VSAC title. The team's captains were C. Lyons and M. Runion.

== Schedule ==
| Date | Time | Opponent | Site | Result | Attendance | Source |
|---|---|---|---|---|---|---|
| September 15 | | Carson–Newman* | Horace Jones Field; Murfreesboro, TN | W 38–0 | | |
| September 23 | | at Vanderbilt* | Dudley Field; Nashville, TN | L 7–22 | | |
| September 29 | | Sewart Air Force Base* | Horace Jones Field; Murfreesboro, TN | W 46–6 | | |
| October 6 | | Union (TN) | Horace Jones Field; Murfreesboro, TN | W 60–6 | | |
| October 13 | | at Austin Peay | Clarksville Municipal Stadium; Clarksville, TN | W 27–6 | | |
| October 20 | | at Morehead State* | Morehead, KY | W 33–13 | | |
| October 26 | 7:30 p.m. | Emory and Henry* | Horace Jones Field; Murfreesboro, TN | T 20–20 | | |
| November 3 | 7:30 p.m. | at Florence State* | Coffee Stadium; Florence, AL | W 21–0 | | |
| November 10 | | at Murray State* | Cutchin Stadium; Murray, KY | L 7–19 | | |
| November 15 | 7:30 p.m. | East Tennessee State | Horace Jones Field; Murfreesboro, TN | W 45–0 | | |
| November 22 | 2:00 p.m. | Tennessee Tech* | Horace Jones Field; Murfreesboro, TN | T 14–14 | 7,500 | |
*Non-conference game; All times are in Central time
