= 1951 Indiana State Sycamores football team =

American college football season

1951 Indiana State Sycamores football
- Conference: Indiana Collegiate Conference
- Record: 0–6–1 (0–3–1 ICC)
- Head coach: Mark Dean (1st season)
- Home stadium: Memorial Stadium

1951 Indiana Collegiate Conference football standings
	Conf.					Overall
Team	W		L		T	W		L		T
Valparaiso $	4	–	0	–	0	9	–	0	–	0
Saint Joseph's (IN)	3	–	1	–	0	4	–	4	–	0
Butler	3	–	2	–	0	4	–	4	–	1
Evansville	1	–	1	–	0	5	–	5	–	0
Indiana State	0	–	3	–	1	0	–	6	–	1
Ball State	0	–	4	–	1	0	–	6	–	1
$ – Conference champion

The 1951 Indiana State Sycamores football team was an American football team that represented Indiana State Teachers College—now known as Indiana State University—as a member of the Indiana Collegiate Conference (ICC) during the 1951 college football season. Led by first-year head coach Mark Dean, the Sycamores compiled an overall record of 0–6–1 with a mark of 0–3–1 in conference play, placing fifth in the ICC.

== Schedule ==
Date	Time	Opponent	Site	Result	Attendance	Source
September 22	2:00 p.m.	at Illinois State Normal*	McCormick Field; Normal, IL	L 7–27		
September 29		at Valparaiso	Boucher Field; Valparaiso, IN	L 7–46		
October 13		Saint Joseph's (IN)	Memorial Stadium; Terre Haute, IN	L 0–13		
October 20		at Ball State	Ball State Field; Muncie, IN (Blue Key Victory Bell)	T 0–0	7,000	
October 26		at Heidelberg*	Tiffin, OH	L 0–40		
November 3		DePauw*^{†}	Memorial Stadium; Terre Haute, IN	L 13–14		
November 17		Butler	Memorial Stadium; Terre Haute, IN	L 7–14		
*Non-conference game; ^{†}Homecoming; All times are in Central time
