= 1951 Mississippi State Maroons football team =

American college football season

1951 Mississippi State Maroons football
- Conference: Southeastern Conference
- Record: 4–5 (2–5 SEC)
- Head coach: Arthur Morton (3rd season)
- Home stadium: Scott Field

1951 Southeastern Conference football standings
	Conf.					Overall
Team	W		L		T	W		L		T
No. 5 Georgia Tech +	7	–	0	–	0	11	–	0	–	1
No. 1 Tennessee +	5	–	0	–	0	10	–	1	–	0
LSU	4	–	2	–	1	7	–	3	–	1
Ole Miss	4	–	2	–	1	6	–	3	–	1
No. 15 Kentucky	3	–	3	–	0	8	–	4	–	0
Auburn	3	–	4	–	0	5	–	5	–	0
Vanderbilt	3	–	5	–	0	6	–	5	–	0
Alabama	3	–	5	–	0	5	–	6	–	0
Florida	2	–	4	–	0	5	–	5	–	0
Georgia	2	–	4	–	0	5	–	5	–	0
Mississippi State	2	–	5	–	0	4	–	5	–	0
Tulane	1	–	5	–	0	4	–	6	–	0
+ – Conference co-champions; Rankings from AP Poll

The 1951 Mississippi State Maroons football team represented Mississippi State College—now known as Mississippi State University—as a member of the Southeastern Conference (SEC) during the 1951 college football season. Led by Arthur Morton in his third and final season as head coach, the Maroons compiled an overall record of 4–5 with a mark of 2–5 in conference play, placing 11th in the SEC. Morton was fired after his third consecutive losing season.

== Schedule ==
Date	Opponent	Site	Result	Attendance	Source
September 22	Arkansas State*	Scott Field; Starkville, MS	W 32–0	4,500	
September 29	at No. 1 Tennessee	Shields–Watkins Field; Knoxville, TN	L 0–14	35,000	
October 6	No. 13 Georgia	Scott Field; Starkville, MS	W 6–0	20,000	
October 13	at Kentucky	McLean Stadium; Lexington, KY	L 0–27		
October 27	Alabama	Scott Field; Starkville, MS (rivalry)	L 0–7	20,000	
November 3	at Tulane	Tulane Stadium; New Orleans, LA	W 10–7		
November 10	at Memphis State*	Crump Stadium; Memphis, TN	W 27–20		
November 17	at LSU	Tiger Stadium; Baton Rouge, LA (rivalry)	L 0–3	20,000	
December 1	Ole Miss	Scott Field; Starkville, MS (Egg Bowl)	L 7–49		
*Non-conference game; Rankings from AP Poll released prior to the game
