= Ellsworth Kingery =

American football player (born 1929)

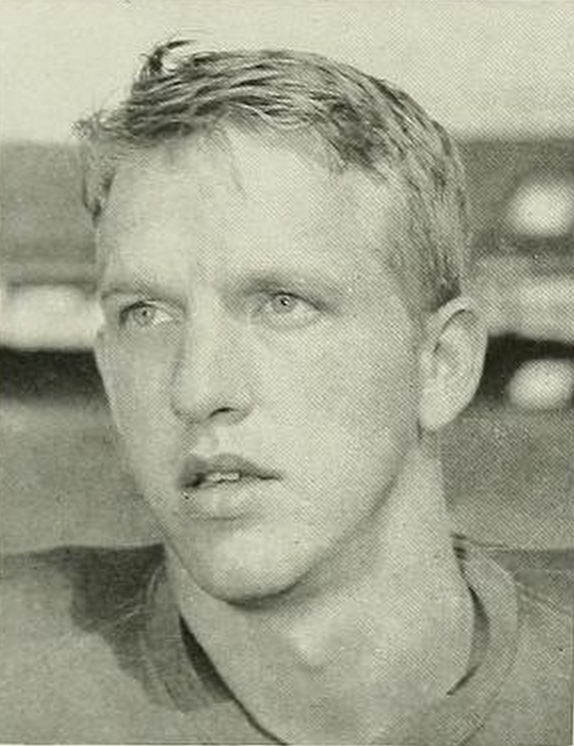
- Kingery pictured c. 1951 at Tulane

No. 21
- Position: Defensive back

Personal information
- Born: August 6, 1929; Lake Charles, Louisiana
- Died: October 17, 2022 (aged 93); Monroe, Louisiana
- Listed height: 5 ft 11 in (1.80 m)
- Listed weight: 185 lb (84 kg)

Career information
- High school: Lake Charles (LA)
- College: Tulane

Career history
- Chicago Cardinals (1954)
- Stats at Pro Football Reference

Ellsworth Lee Kingery (August 6, 1929 – October 17, 2022) was an American football defensive back who played for the Chicago Cardinals. He played college football at Tulane University, having previously attended Lake Charles High School.
