= George Ashworth =

American football player and coach (1912–1994)

Biographical details
- Born: February 20, 1912; Mount Vernon, Indiana, U.S.
- Died: October 16, 1994 (aged 82); Mount Vernon, Indiana, U.S.

Playing career
- 1931–1934: Indiana State

Coaching career (HC unless noted)
- 1949–1950: Indiana State

Head coaching record
- Overall: 2–16–1

George Ashworth (February 20, 1912 – March 6, 1994) was an American college football player and coach. He served as the head football coach at Indiana State University from 1949 to 1950, compiling a record of 2–16–1.

== Head coaching record ==
Year	Team	Overall	Conference	Standing	Bowl/playoffs
Indiana State Sycamores (Independent) (1949–1950)
1949	Indiana State	1–9			
1950	Indiana State	1–7–1			
Indiana State:		2–16–1			
Total:		2–16–1			
