= George Hembree =

American sports coach (1893–1945)

Biographical details
- Born: 1893
- Died: May 17, 1945 (aged 51–52); Amarillo, Texas, U.S.

Coaching career (HC unless noted)

Football
- 1920–1928: Eastern Kentucky

Basketball
- 1920–1929: Eastern Kentucky

Baseball
- 1925–1927: Eastern Kentucky
- 1930: Eastern Kentucky
- 1936: Eastern Kentucky

Administrative career (AD unless noted)
- 1920–1929: Eastern Kentucky

Head coaching record
- Overall: 49–88 (basketball)

George N. Hembree (1893 – May 17, 1945) was an American football, basketball and baseball coach. He served as the head football coach at Eastern Kentucky University from 1920 to 1929 He also served as EKU's head men's basketball coach and baseball coach, in addition to being a faculty member. A major in the United States Army Air Forces during World War II, Hembree died after being hit by a truck in May 1945.
