= Eastern Kentucky Colonels football =

Football program representing Eastern Kentucky University

2026 Eastern Kentucky Colonels football team
- First season: 1891; 135 years ago
- Athletic director: Kyle Moats
- Head coach: Walt Wells; 6th season, 35–33 (.515)
- Location: Richmond, Kentucky
- Stadium: Roy Kidd Stadium (capacity: 20,000)
- Field: CG Bank Field
- NCAA division: Division I FCS
- Conference: UAC
- Colors: Maroon and white
- All-time record: 612–398–38 (.602)
- Bowl record: 4–3 (.571)

NCAA Division I FCS championships
- 1979, 1982

Conference championships
- OVC: 1954, 1962, 1967, 1968, 1974, 1976, 1981, 1982, 1983, 1984, 1986, 1987, 1988, 1990, 1991, 1993, 1994, 1997, 2007, 2008, 2011 ASUN: 2022
- Consensus All-Americans: 46
- Rivalries: Western Kentucky (rivalry); Morehead State (rivalry)
- Fight song: Hail, Hail and Yea, Eastern
- Mascot: The Colonel
- Marching band: Eastern Kentucky University Marching Colonels
- Outfitter: Nike
- Website: EKUSports

The Eastern Kentucky Colonels football program represents Eastern Kentucky University (EKU) in college football, competing at the NCAA Division I Football Championship Subdivision (FCS) level as a member of the United Athletic Conference (UAC). The school has traditionally had much success on the football field, having won 21 OVC conference titles and two Division I FCS National Championships (then called Division I-AA) in 1979 and 1982, and reaching the finals in 1980 and 1981. Much of the success came during the long tenure of head coach Roy Kidd from 1964 to 2002. In 1990, Eastern honored Kidd by naming the school's football stadium Roy Kidd Stadium. Eastern Kentucky's football team was able to secure 31 consecutive winning seasons before finally posting a losing season record in 2009.

In September 2013, the Lexington Herald-Leader, the daily newspaper of nearby Lexington, reported that EKU was considering moving its program to the top-level Football Bowl Subdivision. However, under NCAA rules, such a move would require that EKU receive an invitation from an existing FBS conference. In the end, no such move was made.

EKU left the OVC for the Atlantic Sun Conference, then officially known as the ASUN Conference, in July 2021. At the time, the ASUN did not sponsor football, but had committed to launching an FCS football league in the near future. During the 2021 season, EKU competed as a de facto associate member of the Western Athletic Conference (WAC) in a football partnership between the two leagues officially branded as the "ASUN–WAC Challenge". While the ASUN launched its own football league in 2022, it maintained its partnership with the WAC for the 2022 season. Shortly after that season, the two conferences fully merged their football leagues, announcing the new branding of United Athletic Conference in April 2023. In July 2026, the football-only UAC was merged into the WAC, which rebranded as the UAC. EKU was one of five ASUN members, all of which had played in the football-only UAC, to join the all-sports UAC.

== Conference affiliation ==
- Kentucky Intercollegiate Athletic Conference (1927–1947)
- Ohio Valley Conference (1948–2020)
- ASUN–WAC Challenge (2021)
- ASUN Conference (2022)
- United Athletic Conference, football-only (2023–2025)
- United Athletic Conference, all-sports (2026–present)

== Championships ==
=== National championships ===
Eastern Kentucky went to four consecutive national championship games, winning twice in 1979 and 1982 while finishing as runner-up in 1980 and 1981 to Boise State and Idaho State, respectively.

Season	Coach	Selector	Record	Opponent	Result
1979	Roy Kidd	NCAA I-AA Playoff	11–2	Lehigh	W 30–7
1982	Roy Kidd	NCAA I-AA Playoff	13–0	Delaware	W 17–14

=== Conference championships ===
Eastern Kentucky has won 22 conference championships, 16 outright and 6 shared.

Year	Conference	Head Coach	Overall Record	Conference Record
1954	Ohio Valley Conference	Glenn Presnell	8–1–1	5–0
1962	Ohio Valley Conference	Glenn Presnell	6–3	4–2
1967	Ohio Valley Conference	Roy Kidd	8–1–2	5–0–2
1968	Ohio Valley Conference	Roy Kidd	8–2	7–0
1974	Ohio Valley Conference	Roy Kidd	8–2	6–1
1976	Ohio Valley Conference	Roy Kidd	8–3	6–1
1981	Ohio Valley Conference	Roy Kidd	12–2	8–0
1982	Ohio Valley Conference	Roy Kidd	13–0	7–0
1983	Ohio Valley Conference	Roy Kidd	7–3-1	6–1
1984	Ohio Valley Conference	Roy Kidd	8–4	6–1
1986†	Ohio Valley Conference	Roy Kidd	10–3–1	6–1
1987†	Ohio Valley Conference	Roy Kidd	9–3	5–1
1988	Ohio Valley Conference	Roy Kidd	11–3	6–0
1990†	Ohio Valley Conference	Roy Kidd	10–2	5–1
1991	Ohio Valley Conference	Roy Kidd	12–2	7–0
1993	Ohio Valley Conference	Roy Kidd	8–4	8–0
1994	Ohio Valley Conference	Roy Kidd	10–3	8–0
1997	Ohio Valley Conference	Roy Kidd	8–4	7–0
2007	Ohio Valley Conference	Danny Hope	9–3	8–0
2008	Ohio Valley Conference	Dean Hood	8–4	7–1
2011†	Ohio Valley Conference	Dean Hood	7–5	6–2
2022	Atlantic Sun	Walt Wells	7–5	3–2

† Co-champion

== Bowl games ==
Eastern Kentucky has participated in six bowl games. Four of these bowl games served as a sort of championship game, whether as a regional championship game or as the NCAA Division I Football Championship. The EKU Colonels played in the inaugural Opportunity Bowl presented by Raising Cane's, and in memory of Dr. Sheila Pressley, on Nov. 21, 2020. Eastern Kentucky University hosted the second annual Opportunity Bowl presented by Dinsmore & Shohl on Nov. 20, 2021. The game was matchup EKU and Jacksonville State University.

Season	Coach	Bowl	Opponent	Result
1954	Glenn Presnell	Tangerine Bowl	Omaha	L 7–6
1967	Roy Kidd	Grantland Rice Bowl	Ball State	W 27–13
1980	Roy Kidd	Camellia Bowl	Boise State	L 29–31
1981	Roy Kidd	Pioneer Bowl	Idaho State	L 23–34
1982	Roy Kidd	Pioneer Bowl	Delaware	W 17–14
2020	Walt Wells	Opportunity Bowl	Western Carolina	W 49–17
2021	Walt Wells	Opportunity Bowl	Jacksonville State	W 39–31

== Playoff appearances ==
=== NCAA Division I-AA/FCS ===
Eastern Kentucky University football is considered the first dynasty in FCS football. Including a four-year run to the championship game from 1979 to 1982. During this time period they went 46–7 under legendary coach Roy Kidd. Eastern Kentucky is second all time in the FCS for playoff appearances with 23 total (Montana 28/UNI 22). Below is a list of all playoff appearances.

Season	Round	Opponent	Result
1979	Semifinals; Championship	Nevada; Lehigh	W 33–30 ^{2OT} W 30–7
1980	Semifinals; Championship	Lehigh; Boise State	W 23–20; L 29–31
1981	Quarterfinals; Semifinals; Championship	Delaware; Boise State; Idaho State	W 35–28; W 23–17; L 23–34
1982	Quarterfinals; Semifinals; Championship	Idaho; Tennessee State; Delaware	W 38–30; W 13–7; W 17–14
1983	First Round	Boston University	L 20–24
1984	First Round	Middle Tennessee	L 10–27
1986	First Round; Quarterfinals; Semifinals	Furman; Eastern Illinois; Arkansas State	W 23–10; W 24–22; L 10–24
1987	First Round; Quarterfinals	Western Kentucky; Northeast Louisiana	W 40–17; L 32–33
1988	First Round; Quarterfinals; Semifinals	UMass; Western Kentucky; Georgia Southern	W 28–17; W 41–24; L 17–21
1989	First Round	Youngstown State	L 24–28
1990	First Round	Furman	L 17–45
1991	First Round; Quarterfinals; Semifinals	Appalachian State; Middle Tennessee; Marshall	W 14–3; W 23–13; L 7–14
1992	First Round	Marshall	L 0–44
1993	First Round	Georgia Southern	L 12–14
1994	First Round; Quarterfinals	Boston University; Youngstown State	W 30–23; L 15–18
1995	First Round	Montana	L 0–48
1997	First Round	Western Kentucky	L 14–42
2007	First Round	Richmond	L 14–31
2008	First Round	Richmond	L 10–38
2011	First Round	James Madison	L 17–20
2014	First Round	Indiana State	L 16–36
2022	First Round	Gardner–Webb	L 41–52
2024	First Round	Villanova	L 17–22

=== NCAA Division II ===
The Colonels made one appearance in the Division II playoffs, with a record of 0–1.

Year	Round	Opponent	Result
1976	Quarterfinals	North Dakota State	L, 7–10

== Head coaches ==
Years	Coach	Record	Conference championships
1909	Jim Park	0–0–4	0
1910–1911	Clyde H. Wilson	2–7–1	0
1912	Charles A. Keith	3–4–1	0
1913–1916	Ben Barnard	8–13–2	0
1919–1921	Clyde McCoy	3–6–1	0
1922–1928	George Hembree	21–29–4	0
1929–1934	Turkey Hughes	8–29–6	0
1935–1946	Rome Rankin	56–24–6	0
1947–1953	Tom Samuels	41–24–2	0
1954–1963	Glenn Presnell	42–49–3	2
1964–2002	Roy Kidd	315–123–8	16
2003–2007	Danny Hope	35–22	1
2008–2015	Dean Hood	55–38	2
2016–2019	Mark Elder	21–24	0
2020–present	Walt Wells	35–33	1

== Rivalries ==
=== Western Kentucky ===
The Battle of the Bluegrass is the name given to the Eastern Kentucky–Western Kentucky football rivalry. Both schools were formerly members of the Ohio Valley Conference and played against each other regularly until Western Kentucky's transition from the NCAA's FCS to FBS in 2008. The two teams have met 84 times on the football field, with Western Kentucky currently holding a 47–35–3 edge in the all-time series. This rivalry has been known to be particularly competitive with neither team gaining an edge until recent history with Western moving up to the FBS level. It is known as the oldest and most fierce rivalry the commonwealth of Kentucky has, even more so than larger schools of the University of Kentucky and University of Louisville's Governors Cup game because of how many times the teams met, the longevity of the rivalry, and the important conference implications the annual game used to hold.

After a nearly nine year pause, the series resumed again in 2017, when Western Kentucky hosted Eastern Kentucky in a game played at Houchens Industries–L. T. Smith Stadium, where Western Kentucky won 31–17. After another seven year pause, the teams met again on September 7, 2024, at Western Kentucky, where they won once again 31–0.

=== Morehead State ===
The Old Hawg Rifle is the name of the rivalry trophy between the Eastern Kentucky Colonels and the Morehead State Eagles. This rivalry was important because the schools are in such close proximity and are serving the same general Eastern Kentucky region. The gun is an antique, pre-Revolutionary War muzzleloader that is rumored to have once been used in Kentucky's Rowan County War. The rifle has not been actively used in the rivalry since 1962, though the two teams have continued to play against each other since then. The rifle is currently kept on display in the Morehead State student center. The two teams have met 73 times on the football field, with Eastern Kentucky currently holding a 53–16–4 edge in the all-time series. Eastern Kentucky has won 28 out of the last 29 matchups.

== Program records ==
=== Team records ===
- Consecutive winning seasons: 31, 1977–2008
- Consecutive wins: 18, 1982–1983
- Consecutive National Title appearances: 4, 1979–1982

=== Individual records ===
- Most rushing yards (game): 300 Markus Thomas against Marshall 1989
- Most rushing yards (season): 1,998 Elroy Harris in the 1988 season
- Most rushing yards (career):' 5,532 Markus Thomas 1989–1992
- Most passing yards (game): 464 Bennie Coney against Tennessee Tech 2015
- Most passing yards (season): 2,861 Josh Greco in the 2005 season
- Most passing yards (career): 12,756 Parker McKinney 2018–2023
- Most receiving yards (game): 316 Aaron Marsh against Northwood 1967
- Most receiving yards (season): 1,150 Andre Ralston in the 2005 season
- Most receiving yards (career): 3,095 Andre Ralston 2002–2005
- Most completions (season):225 Bennie Coney 2015

== Future non-conference opponents ==
Announced schedules as of August 24, 2026.

2027	2028	2029
at Chattanooga	Western Carolina	at Kentucky
Southeast Missouri	at Middle Tennessee	
at Vanderbilt	at Cincinnati	
	Tennessee Tech	
