= Rome Rankin =

American football and basketball coach (1900–1981)

Biographical details
- Born: August 11, 1900
- Died: June 1981 (aged 80)
- Education: Kentucky (Ph.D., 1947)

Coaching career (HC unless noted)

Football
- 1935–1942: Eastern Kentucky
- 1945–1946: Eastern Kentucky
- 1947: Maine (assistant)

Basketball
- 1935–1943: Eastern Kentucky
- 1943–1944: Kentucky (assistant)
- 1944–1946: Eastern Kentucky
- 1949–1954: Maine

Administrative career (AD unless noted)
- 1951–1966: Maine

Head coaching record
- Overall: 56–24–6 (football); 173–106 (basketball)

Rome Rankin (August 11, 1900 – June 1981) was an American football and basketball coach.

== Eastern Kentucky University ==
He served as the head football coach at Eastern Kentucky University from 1935 to 1942 and from 1945 to 1946. He was also the school's head men's basketball coach from 1935 to 1943 and from 1944 to 1946.

== University of Kentucky ==
While Eastern Kentucky University put their athletic program on hiatus during World War II, Rankin served as an assistant to basketball coach Adolph Rupp at the University of Kentucky for one season (1943–1944).

== University of Maine ==
He served as the head basketball coach at the University of Maine from 1949 to 1954. He selected several future Maine Hall of Famers, including Jack Butterfield and Harold Westerman. He also served as an assistant football coach during his early tenure.
