= Turkey Hughes =

American athlete and coach (1902–1985)

Biographical details
- Born: April 22, 1902
- Died: August 31, 1985 (aged 83); Richmond, Kentucky, U.S.

Playing career

Football
- 1923–1924: Kentucky

Basketball
- 1923–1925: Kentucky

Coaching career (HC unless noted)

Football
- 1929–1934: Eastern Kentucky

Basketball
- 1929–1935: Eastern Kentucky

Baseball
- 1930–1959: Eastern Kentucky

Administrative career (AD unless noted)
- 1942–1963: Eastern Kentucky

Charles "Turkey" Hughes (April 22, 1902 – August 31, 1985) was a coach and administrator at Eastern Kentucky University (EKU) from 1922 to 1972. Hughes coached over five different teams which included baseball, tennis, basketball and football. As an administrator he served as the Chairman of the Department of Health and Physical Education. Hughes served as the athletic director as well. He did all of this when there were only seven buildings on campus.

Early in his career at EKU, Hughes was coaching football, baseball and basketball and only had one assistant. He did this until 1936. He stuck with football until 1941 and he became the Chairman of the Health and Physical Education Department. In 1941 he became the athletic director and head coached the baseball team. He did this until his retirement in 1971. He however went part time in 1965 because the demand for two jobs became too great. Hughes described that he never knew that there could be such tall buildings on campus and said old buildings could tell a lot of stories.

== Forming the Ohio Valley Conference (OVC) ==
"Turkey" Hughes helped form the Ohio Valley Conference. He is known as the "Dean of the OVC". It all started on February 27, 1948, Eastern Kentucky University, Western Kentucky University, Morehead State University, Murray State University, and Louisville University withdrew from the Kentucky Intercollegiate Athletic Conference and joined with Evansville College to form the Ohio Valley Conference. A prominent leader in this movement was "Turkey" Hughes, in December 1948, Marshall College of Huntington joined the conference, West Virginia University and Tennessee Tech University joined which boosted EKU's national recognition. In 1950 EKU's baseball team coached by Hughes won its first baseball championship in the history of the sport.

== Legacy ==
Hughes left a strong and lasting impact at Eastern Kentucky University (EKU). A memorial scholarship fund honoring the late Hughes was established on November 19, 1985. Some of his good friends came together to establish a committee to form this scholarship fund. The committee established a goal of 10,000 dollars to endow a fund which would provide for one 1,000 or two 500 dollar scholarships annually to deserving students in the area of health, physical education, recreation and athletics. Hughes was also inducted into the Kentucky Athletic Hall of Fame in April 1975. At the University of Kentucky he set a record for the longest interception returned for a touchdown against the University of Alabama, the interception was 98 yards total. At the University of Kentucky he was the first ever two four-sport athlete to garner letters. Hughes also led the EKU baseball team to its first ever OVC Championship in 1950, overall his baseball teams at EKU won over 350 games. Hughes also coached the football team from 1929 to 1935. Some of the players said the game of football brought them out of the coal mines. Hughes said a secret of such large success was the changing of the offense and the team ran from the T with a split line and shifted into the Notre Dame box and short punt. Donald R. Feltner, Vice President of the University for Relations and Development and a former player for EKU baseball who played under Hughes said, "Turkey's" passing leaves a personal sense of loss such as that which must be experienced when one loses a father to many hundreds of people. He had two sons, Charles Hughes Jr, and Allen Hughes. Hughes was inducted into the Kentucky Athletics Hall of Fame April 1975.
