= Hank Lauricella =

American politician

Profile
- Positions: Halfback, quarterback

Personal information
- Born: October 9, 1930; Harahan, Louisiana, U.S.
- Died: March 25, 2014 (aged 83); Jefferson, Louisiana, U.S.

Career information
- College: Tennessee
- NFL draft: 1952: 17th round

Career history
- 1952: Dallas Texans

Awards and highlights
- National champion (1951); Unanimous All-American (1951); 2× First-team All-SEC (1950, 1951)
- Stats at Pro Football Reference
- College Football Hall of Fame

Other information

Louisiana State Representative for Jefferson Parish
- In office 1964–1972

Louisiana State Senator for Jefferson Parish
- In office 1972–1996
- Succeeded by: Art Lentini

Personal details
- Party: Democrat / later Republican
- Spouse: Betty Valker Lauricella
- Children: Francis Lauricella Jr. Louis Lauricella; Elizabeth Lauricella McStravick; Marc Lauricella Christopher Lauricella
- Education: Holy Cross High School (New Orleans); University of Tennessee
- Occupation: Real estate businessman

Military service
- Branch/service: United States Army Corps of Engineers
- Rank: First lieutenant

Francis Edward Lauricella, known as Hank Lauricella (October 9, 1930 – March 25, 2014), was an American real estate developer from suburban New Orleans, Louisiana, a college football player, and a member of both houses of the Louisiana State Legislature.

== Early life ==
Lauricella was a star at Holy Cross High School in New Orleans, Louisiana. His team there won the city championship in 1947, using the single wing offense.

== College career ==
Lauricella played under coach Robert Neyland at the University of Tennessee from 1949 to 1951. He was a member of the 1950 National Championship team and the 1951 National Championship team. Lauricella gained fame as the running back in the single wing offense, at the time that most schools had switched to the T-formation. At that position, Lauricella was responsible for the majority of the rushing and passing.

Lauricella was named as an All-American in 1951 and was the first runner up in the Heisman Trophy voting to Dick Kazmaier of Princeton University that same year. He was elected to the College Football Hall of Fame in 1981.

Louisiana State Senate
Preceded by At-large membership: John G. Schwegmann; Jules G. Mollere Samuel B. Nunez Jr.	Louisiana State Senator for Jefferson Parish; Francis Edward "Hank" Lauricella; 1972–1996	Succeeded by Art Lentini
