= 1951 college football rankings =

- Season: 1951
- Bowl season: 1951–52 bowl games
- Preseason No. 1: Tennessee
- End of season champions: Tennessee

Two human polls comprised the 1951 college football rankings. Unlike most sports, college football's governing body, the NCAA, does not bestow a national championship, instead that title is bestowed by one or more different polling agencies. There are two main weekly polls that begin in the preseason—the AP Poll and the Coaches Poll.

== Legend ==
	Increase in ranking
	Decrease in ranking
	Not ranked previous week
	National champion
(#–#)	Win–loss record
(Italics)	Number of first place votes
т	Tied with team above or below also with this symbol

== AP poll ==
The final AP poll was released on December 3, at the end of the 1951 regular season, weeks before the major bowls. The AP would not release a post-bowl season final poll regularly until 1968.

	Preseason	Week 3 Oct 1	Week 4 Oct 8	Week 5 Oct 15	Week 6 Oct 22	Week 7 Oct 29	Week 8 Nov 5	Week 9 Nov 12	Week 10 Nov 19	Week 11 Nov 26	Week 12 (Final) Dec 3	
1.	Tennessee (60)	Michigan State (2–0) (37)	Michigan State (3–0) (42)	California (4–0) (50)	Tennessee (4–0) (70)	Tennessee (5–0) (59)	Tennessee (6–0) (60)	Michigan State (7–0) (55)	Tennessee (8–0) (60)	Tennessee (9–0) (92)	Tennessee (10–0) (139)	1.
2.	Michigan State (18)	California (2–0) (22)	California (3–0) (36)	Tennessee (3–0) (26)	Michigan State (5–0) (28)	Michigan State (6–0) (25)	Illinois (6–0) (29)	Tennessee (7–0) (42)	Michigan State (8–0) (38)	Michigan State (9–0) (34)	Michigan State (9–0) (104)	2.
3.	Ohio State (8)	Tennessee (1–0) (27)	Tennessee (2–0) (18)	Michigan State (4–0) (16)	Georgia Tech (5–0) (16)	Illinois (5–0) (15)	Maryland (6–0) (21)	Illinois (7–0) (20)	Stanford (9–0) (18)	Maryland (9–0) (18)	Maryland (9–0) (18)	3.
4.	Oklahoma (16)	Oklahoma (1–0) (18)	Texas A&M (2–0) (3)	Texas (4–0) (6)	Illinois (4–0) (12)	Maryland (5–0) (22)	Princeton (6–0) (6)	Stanford (8–0) (12)	Maryland (8–0) (26)	Illinois (8–0–1) (4)	Illinois (8–0–1) (10)	4.
5.	California (3)	Notre Dame (1–0) (9)	Notre Dame (2–0) (4)	Georgia Tech (4–0) (12)	Maryland (4–0) (13)	Georgia Tech (6–0) (9)	Michigan State (6–0) (12)	Maryland (7–0) (16)	Princeton (8–0) (8)	Princeton (9–0) (4)	Georgia Tech (10–0–1) (8)	5.
6.	Kentucky (1)	Texas (2–0) (6)	Texas (3–0) (4)	Texas A&M (3–0) (8)	USC (5–0) (13)	Princeton (5–0) (14)	USC (7–0) (6)	Princeton (7–0) (6)	Illinois (7–0–1) (3)	Georgia Tech (9–0–1) (1)	Princeton (9–0) (3)	6.
7.	Texas A&M	Ohio State (1–0) (1)	Illinois (2–0)	Maryland (3–0) (14)	Baylor (4–0) (2)	USC (6–0) (7)	Stanford (7–0) (8)	Georgia Tech (7–0–1)	Georgia Tech (8–0–1) (2)	Wisconsin (7–1–1) (5)	Stanford (9–1) (1)	7.
8.	Washington (3)	Illinois (1–0)	Georgia Tech (3–0) (3)	Illinois (3–0) (3)	Princeton (4–0) (2)	Baylor (4–0–1)	Georgia Tech (6–0–1) (1)	Wisconsin (5–1–1) (2)	Wisconsin (6–1–1) (3)	Stanford (9–1) (1)	Wisconsin (7–1–1) (10)	8.
9.	Alabama (2)	Maryland (1–0) (4)	Ohio State (1–1)	Princeton (3–0) (1)	California (4–1) (1)	California (5–1)	Wisconsin (4–1–1) (3)	Kentucky (6–3) (4)	Kentucky (7–3) (4)	Baylor (7–1–1)	Baylor (8–1–1)	9.
10.	Illinois (2)	Texas A&M (1–0)	Maryland (2–0) (1)	Baylor (3–0)	Texas (4–1)	Wisconsin (3–1–1) (2)	Texas (6–1)	Baylor (5–1–1)	Baylor (6–1–1)	Oklahoma (7–2) (2)	Oklahoma (8–2) (4)	10.
11.	Texas (1)	Georgia Tech (2–0) (4)	Oklahoma (1–1)	USC (4–0)	Stanford (5–0) (1)	Stanford (6–0)	Notre Dame (5–1) (1)	USC (7–1)	USC (7–2)	TCU (5–4)	TCU (6–4)	11.
12.	Nebraska	Washington (2–0) (2)	Baylor (2–0)	Villanova (3–0)	Cornell (4–0) (1)	Texas (5–1)	Kentucky (5–3) (3)	Oklahoma (5–2) (1)	Oklahoma (6–2)	California (8–2) (3)	California (8–2) (2)	12.
13.	Baylor	Georgia (2–0) (1)	Princeton (2–0)	Stanford (4–0)	Northwestern (4–0)	Notre Dame (4–1)	TCU (5–2)	TCU (5–2)	San Francisco (8–0)	Virginia (8–1) (1)	Virginia (8–1) (5)	13.
14.	Notre Dame (1)	Princeton (1–0)	USC (3–0)	Cornell (3–0)	Wisconsin (2–1–1)	Kentucky (4–3) (1)	Oklahoma (4–2) (1)	San Francisco (7–0)	Texas (7–2)	San Francisco (9–0)	San Francisco (9–0) (2)	14.
15.	Wisconsin	Oregon State (1–1) (1)	Holy Cross (2–0)	SMU (3–1)	Notre Dame (3–1)	Michigan (3–2)	San Francisco (7–0)	Texas (6–2)	Virginia (7–1) (1)	UCLA (5–3–1)	Kentucky (7–4)	15.
16.	Maryland	Duke (2–0)	Clemson (3–0)	Pacific (4–0) (1)	Texas A&M (3–1) (1)	Washington State (4–2)	Baylor (4–1–1)	California (5–3)	Holy Cross (7–1) (1)	Texas (7–2)	Boston University (6–4) (2)	16.
17.	Michigan	Kentucky (1–2)	Cornell (2–0)	Ohio State (1–1–1)	Kentucky (3–3) (1)	Oklahoma (3–2) (1)	California (5–2) т	Washington State (5–3)	Washington State (6–3)	Kentucky (7–4)	UCLA (5–3–1)	17.
18.	Princeton	Clemson (2–0) (1)	Oregon State (2–1)	Northwestern (3–0)	Washington State (3–2)	Texas A&M (3–1–1)	Washington State (5–2) т	UCLA (4–3)	Rice (5–3)	Washington State (7–3)	Washington State (7–3)	18.
19.	Pennsylvania	Baylor (1–0)	Stanford (3–0)	Oklahoma (1–2)	Arkansas (3–2)	Miami (FL) (4–1)	Pacific (6–1) (1)	Rice (4–3)	California (7–2)	Holy Cross (8–1)	Holy Cross (8–2) (1) т	19.
20.	Cornell	Kansas (2–0)	Pacific (3–0) (1)	Washington (3–1)	San Francisco (5–0)	San Francisco (6–0)	Arkansas (4–3) т; Ohio State (3–2–1) т	Cincinnati (8–0)	Bucknell (9–0)	USC (7–3)	Clemson (7–2) т	20.
	Preseason	Week 3 Oct 1	Week 4 Oct 8	Week 5 Oct 15	Week 6 Oct 22	Week 7 Oct 29	Week 8 Nov 5	Week 9 Nov 12	Week 10 Nov 19	Week 11 Nov 26	Week 12 (Final) Dec 3	
		Dropped: Alabama; Nebraska; Wisconsin; Michigan; Pennsylvania; Cornell	Dropped: Washington; Georgia; Duke; Kentucky; Kansas	Dropped: Notre Dame; Holy Cross; Clemson; Oregon State	Dropped: Villanova; SMU; Pacific; Ohio State; Oklahoma; Washington	Dropped: Cornell; Northwestern; Arkansas	Dropped: Michigan; Texas A&M; Miami (FL)	Dropped: Notre Dame; Pacific; Arkansas; Ohio State	Dropped: TCU; UCLA; Cincinnati	Dropped: Rice; Bucknell	Dropped: Texas; USC	

== United Press poll ==
The final UP Coaches Poll was released prior to the bowl games, on December 3.
Tennessee received 23 of the 35 first-place votes; Michigan State received seven, Maryland two, and one each to Illinois, Georgia Tech, and Princeton.

Ranking	Team	Conference	Bowl
1	Tennessee	SEC	Lost Sugar, 13–28
2	Michigan State	Independent	none
3	Illinois	Big Ten	Won Rose, 40–7
4	Maryland	Southern	Won Sugar, 28–13
5	Georgia Tech	SEC	Won Orange, 17–14
6	Princeton	Independent	none
7	Stanford	Pacific Coast	Lost Rose, 7–40
8	Wisconsin	Big Ten	none
9	Baylor	Southwest	Lost Orange, 14–17
10	TCU	Southwest	Lost Cotton, 7–20
11	Oklahoma	Big Seven	none
12	California	Pacifie Coast	none
13	Notre Dame	Independent	none
14	Purdue	Big Ten	none
14	San Francisco	Independent	none
14	Washington State	Pacific Coast	none
17	Holy Cross	Independent	none
17	Kentucky	SEC	Won Cotton, 20–7
17	UCLA	Pacific Coast	none
20	Kansas	Big Seven	none

- Prior to the 1975 season, the Big Ten and Pacific Coast (later AAWU / Pac-8) conferences allowed only one postseason participant each, for the Rose Bowl.
- The Ivy League has prohibited its members from participating in postseason football since the league was officially formed in 1954.

== Litkenhous Ratings ==
The Litkenhous Ratings released in mid-December 1951 provided numerical rankings to over 650 college football programs. The top 100 ranked teams were:

1. Tennessee (10–1)
2. Maryland (10–0)
3. Michigan State (9–0)
4. Oklahoma (8–2)
5. California (8–2)
6. Georgia Tech (11–0–1)
7. Baylor (8–2–1)
8. Illinois (9–0–1)
9. Wisconsin (7–1–1)
10. Kentucky (8–4)
11. Stanford (9–2)
12. UCLA (5–3–1)
13. Texas (7–3)
14. Notre Dame (7–2–1)
15. Ole Miss (6–3–1)
16. USC (7–3)
17. TCU (6–5)
18. SMU (3–6–1)
19. Princeton (9–0)
20. Texas A&M (5–3–2)
21. Holy Cross (8–2)
22. Washington State (7–3)
23. Washington (3–6–1)
24. Xavier (9–0–1)
25. Oregon State (4–6)
26. Arkansas (5–5)
27. San Francisco (9–0)
28. Rice (5–5)
29. Michigan (4–5)
30. Virginia (8–1)
31. Ohio State (4–3–2)
32. Tulsa (9–2)
33. LSU (7–3–1)
34. Cincinnati (10–1)
35. Florida (5–5)
36. Alabama (5–6)
37. Purdue (5–4)
38. Kansas (8–2)
39. Penn (5–4)
40. Texas Tech (7–4)
41. Miami (FL) (8–3)
42. Vanderbilt (6–5)
43. Northwestern (5–4)
44. Cornell (6–3)
45. Clemson (7–3)
46. Pacific (6–5)
47. Colorado (7–3)
48. Georgia (5–5)
49. Navy (2–6–1)
50. Mississippi State (4–5)
51. Duke (5–4–1)
52. Tulane (4–6)
53. Marquette (4–6–1)
54. Boston University (6–4)
55. Indiana (3–6_
56. Villanova (5–3)
57. Wake Forest
58. Pittsburgh (3–7)
59. Columbia (5–3)
60. Penn State (5–4)
61. Santa Clara (3–5–1)
62. Wyoming (7–2–1)
63. Houston (6–5)
64. Bucknell (9–0)
65. Syracuse (5–4)
66. Washington & Lee (6–4)
67. North Carolina (2–8)
68. South Carolina (5–4)
69. Iowa (2–5–2)
70. North Texas (8–4)
71. Dayton (7–3)
72. Fordham (5–4)
73. Auburn (5–5)
74. Iowa State (4–4–1)
75. Minnesota (2–6–1)
76. Arizona State (6–3–1)
77. Denver (6–4)
78. Hardin–Simmons (6–6)
79. Dartmouth (4–5)
80. Drake (7–2)
81. Chattanooga (6–5)
82. Memphis State (5–3)
83. Miami (OH) (7–3)
84. Oklahoma A&M (3–7)
85. Boston College (3–6)
86. Missouri (3–7)
87. Arkansas State (10–2)
88. Del Mar (9–1)
89. Army (2–7)
90. Rutgers (4–4)
91. William & Mary (5–4–1)
92. VMI (7–3)
93. Nebraska (2–8)
94. Colgate (4–5)
95. Yale (2–5–2)
96. Loyola (Los Angeles) (3–6)
97. Tyler (10–1)
98. Temple (6–4)
99. Oregon (2–8)
100. Toledo (6–4)
101. Louisville (5–4)
102. Colorado A&M (5–4–1)
103. George Washington (2–6–1)
104. West Virginia (5–5)
105. Mississippi Southern (6–5)
106. Kansas State (0–9)
107. Utah (7–4)
108. Compton (10–1)
109. Pasadena (12–0)
110. Detroit (4–7)
111. NC State (3–7)
112. Idaho (2–7)
113. East Texas (9–2)
114. Furman (3–6–1)
115. Long Beach (8–1–1)
116. South Dakota State (8–1–1)
117. Kent State (4–3–2)
118. Ohio (5–4–1)
119. Utah State (3–5–1)
120. St. Bonaventure (5–4)
121. San Jose State (2–7–1)
122. Harvard (3–5–1)
123. Valparaiso (9–0)
124. South Dakota (7–1)
125. Abilene Christian (6–4)
126. Brown (2–7)
132. Arizona (6–5)
133. Murray State (8–1)
137. Lehigh (7–2)
138. San Diego State (10–0–1)
139. Middle Tennessee (7–2–2)
140. Citadel (4–6)
146. Marshall (5–4–1)
204. Western Kentucky (4–5)

== HBCU rankings ==
The Pittsburgh Courier, a leading African American newspaper, ranked the top 1951 teams from historically black colleges and universities in an era when college football was largely segregated. The rankings were published on December 8:

1. Morris Brown (10–1)
2. Florida A&M (7–1–1)
3. Tennessee A&I (8–2)
4. Prairie View A&M (9–1)
5. Central State (7–2)
6. North Carolina A&T (7–1–1)
7. North Carolina College (6–2–1)
8. West Virginia State (6–2–1)
9. Xavier (LA) (8–1)
10. Lincoln (MO) (7–2)
11. Maryland State (7–1)
12. Bethune-Cookman (6–2)

The Associated Negro Press also published rankings on December 14:

1. North Carolina A&T (7–1–1)
2. Morris Brown (10–1)
3. Florida A&M (7–1–1)
4. Prairie View A&M (9–1)
5. Central State (7–2)
6. North Carolina College (6–2–1)
7. Tennessee A&I (8–2)
8. West Virginia State (6–2–1)
9. Lincoln (MO) (7–2)
10. Xavier (LA) (8–1)
11. Alcorn (8–3)
12. Bethune-Cookman (6–2)
13. Maryland State (7–1)
14. Texas Southern (7–2–1)
15. Benedict (7–3)
16. Virginia State (5–3)
17. Texas College (5–3–2)
18. Hampton (5–4)
19. Lincoln (PA) (5–4)
20. Arkansas A&M (5–4–1)
21. Southern (5–4–2)
22. Fisk (6–2)
23. South Carolina State (5–2)
24. Tuskegee (6–3)
25. Grambling (4–5–1)
26. Jackson State
27. Virginia Union (5–5)
28. Langston (4–5)
29. Mississippi Industrial
30. Howard (5–4)
31. Allen (3–7)

== See also ==
- 1951 College Football All-America Team
