= Bill Tate (American football) =

American football player and coach (1931–2025)

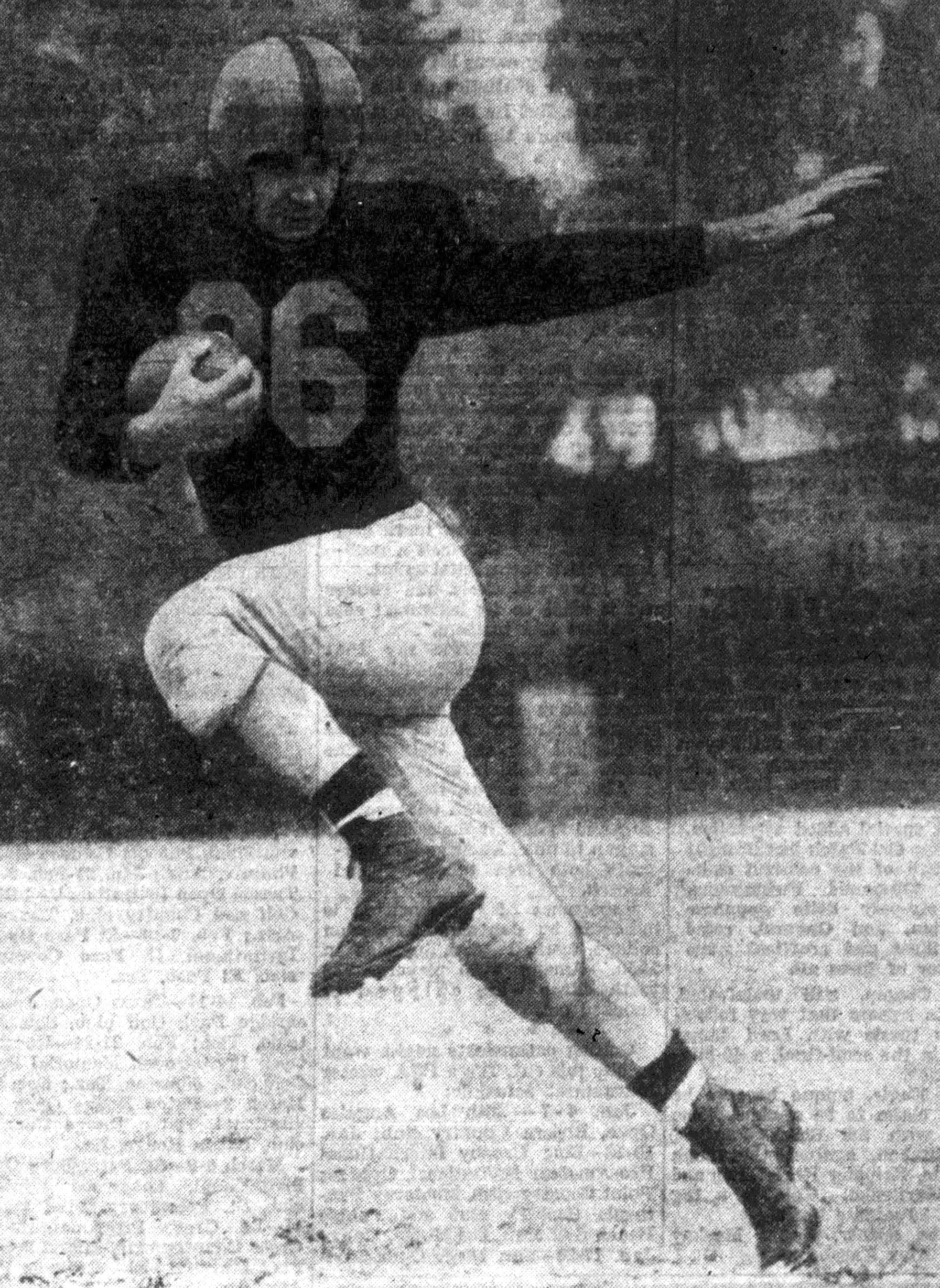
- Tate, circa 1951

Biographical details
- Born: September 9, 1931; Mattoon, Illinois, U.S.
- Died: June 23, 2025 (aged 93)

Playing career
- 1950–1952: Illinois
- Position: Fullback

Coaching career (HC unless noted)
- 1959–1963: Illinois (assistant)
- 1964–1968: Wake Forest

Head coaching record
- Overall: 17–32–1

Accomplishments and honors

Awards
- ACC Coach of the Year (1964); Rose Bowl Hall of Fame (1996)

William L. Tate (September 9, 1931 – June 23, 2025) was an American college football player and coach. He served as the head coach at Wake Forest University from 1964 to 1968, compiling a record of 17–32–1. Tate was a graduate of Mattoon High School in Mattoon, Illinois. Tate played college football as a fullback at the University of Illinois at Urbana–Champaign from 1950 to 1952. He was the most valuable player of the 1952 Rose Bowl, rushing for 150 yards on 20 carries with two touchdowns as Illinois defeated Stanford, 40–7. He died June 23, 2025, at the age of 93.

== Head coaching record ==
Year	Team	Overall	Conference	Standing	Bowl/playoffs
Wake Forest Demon Deacons (Atlantic Coast Conference) (1964–1968)
1964	Wake Forest	5–5	4–3	T–3rd	
1965	Wake Forest	3–7	2–4	7th	
1966	Wake Forest	3–7	2–4	6th	
1967	Wake Forest	4–6	3–4	5th	
1968	Wake Forest	2–7–1	2–3–1	6th	
Wake Forest:		17–32–1	13–18–1		
Total:		17–32–1			
