= 1951 Idaho Vandals football team =

American college football season

1951 Idaho Vandals football
- Conference: Pacific Coast Conference
- Record: 2–7 (0–3 PCC)
- Head coach: Raymond A. Curfman (1st season)
- Offensive scheme: Split-T
- Home stadium: Neale Stadium

1951 Pacific Coast Conference football standings
	Conf.					Overall
Team	W		L		T	W		L		T
No. 7 Stanford $	6	–	1	–	0	9	–	2	–	0
No. 17 UCLA	4	–	1	–	1	5	–	3	–	1
No. 12 California	5	–	2	–	0	8	–	2	–	0
USC	4	–	2	–	0	7	–	3	–	0
No. 18 Washington State	4	–	3	–	0	7	–	3	–	0
Oregon State	3	–	5	–	0	4	–	6	–	0
Washington	1	–	5	–	1	3	–	6	–	1
Oregon	1	–	6	–	0	2	–	8	–	0
Idaho	0	–	3	–	0	2	–	7	–	0
$ – Conference champion; Rankings from AP Poll

The 1951 Idaho Vandals football team represented the University of Idaho as a member of the Pacific Coast Conference (PCC) during the 1951 college football season. Led by first-year head coach Raymond A. Curfman, the Vandals were 2–7 (0–3 in PCC, last). Home games were played on campus at Neale Stadium in Moscow, with one game in Boise at old Bronco Stadium at Boise Junior College and another at Memorial Stadium in Spokane, Washington.

Idaho was led on the field by quarterback Wayne Anderson and halfback Glen Christian; they suffered a close loss in the Battle of the Palouse with heavily favored neighbor Washington State, falling 9–6 on homecoming at Neale Stadium on November 10. The previous edition was also competitive, with a 7–7 tie in 1950 in Pullman, but the winless streak against the Cougars was up to 25 games, a record of 0–23–2 since taking three straight in from 1923 to 1925; Idaho finally won three years later in Pullman.

In the rivalry game with Montana at Missoula four weeks earlier, Idaho began an eight-game winning streak over the Grizzlies with a 12–9 win to regain the Little Brown Stein.

Prior to the season in late March, university president Jesse Buchanan requested and received the resignations of head coach Dixie Howell and two assistants, due to "lack of harmony" on the coaching staff. One of those assistants was Curfman, who was then asked by the administration to be the interim coach during the upcoming spring drills. He made a good impression and was re-hired as head coach in mid-April.

== Schedule ==
Date	Time	Opponent	Site	Result	Attendance	Source
September 22	12:30 pm	at Wyoming*	War Memorial Stadium; Laramie, WY	L 0–28	12,401	
September 29	1:00 pm	vs. San Francisco*	old Bronco Stadium; Boise, ID	L 7–28	10,000	
October 6	2:00 pm	vs. Oregon State	Memorial Stadium; Spokane, WA	L 6–34	8,500	
October 13	1:00 pm	at Montana*	Dornblaser Field; Missoula, MT (Little Brown Stein)	W 12–9	9,000	
October 20	2:00 pm	San Jose State*	Neale Stadium; Moscow, ID	W 40–7	6,500	
November 3	1:30 pm	at Oregon	Hayward Field; Eugene, OR	L 13–14	8,100	
November 10	1:30 pm	No. 17 Washington State^{†}	Neale Stadium; Moscow, ID (Battle of the Palouse)	L 6–9	14,000	
November 17	7:00 pm	at Arizona*	Arizona Stadium; Tucson, AZ	L 6–13	16,000	
November 22	12:00 pm	at Utah*	Ute Stadium; Salt Lake City, UT	L 19–40	11,934	
*Non-conference game; ^{†}Homecoming; Rankings from AP Poll released prior to the game; All times are in Pacific time

== Coaching staff ==
- John Nikcevich, guards
- Mack Flenniken, ends
- Chuck Gottfried, tackles

== All-conference ==
No Vandals were on the All-Coast team; tackle Don Ringe was named to the second team. Honorable mention were end Jerry Ogle and guard Steve Douglas.

== NFL draft ==
One senior from the 1951 Vandals was selected in the 1952 NFL draft:

Player	Position	Round	Pick	Franchise
Glen Christian	B	9th	105	San Francisco 49ers

One junior was selected in the 1953 NFL draft:

Player	Position	Round	Pick	Franchise
Don Ringe	T	26th	303	Chicago Cardinals

One sophomore was selected in the 1954 NFL draft:

Player	Position	Round	Pick	Franchise
Mel Bertrand	C	29th	349	Detroit Lions

- Often incorrectly listed as a UI Vandal, tackle Norm Hayes (1954 draft, #217) played at College of Idaho in Caldwell.
