= 1951 California Golden Bears football team =

American college football season

1951 California Golden Bears football
- Conference: Pacific Coast Conference

Ranking
- Coaches: No. 12
- AP: No. 12
- Record: 8–2 (5–2 PCC)
- Head coach: Pappy Waldorf (5th season)
- Offensive scheme: Single-wing
- Home stadium: California Memorial Stadium

1951 Pacific Coast Conference football standings
	Conf.					Overall
Team	W		L		T	W		L		T
No. 7 Stanford $	6	–	1	–	0	9	–	2	–	0
No. 17 UCLA	4	–	1	–	1	5	–	3	–	1
No. 12 California	5	–	2	–	0	8	–	2	–	0
USC	4	–	2	–	0	7	–	3	–	0
No. 18 Washington State	4	–	3	–	0	7	–	3	–	0
Oregon State	3	–	5	–	0	4	–	6	–	0
Washington	1	–	5	–	1	3	–	6	–	1
Oregon	1	–	6	–	0	2	–	8	–	0
Idaho	0	–	3	–	0	2	–	7	–	0
$ – Conference champion; Rankings from AP Poll

The 1951 California Golden Bears football team was an American football team that represented the University of California, Berkeley in the Pacific Coast Conference (PCC) during the 1951 college football season. Under fifth-year head coach Pappy Waldorf, the Golden Bears compiled an overall record of 8–2 (5–2 in PCC, third). Home games were played on campus at California Memorial Stadium in Berkeley, California.

After three consecutive appearances, the Bears did not play in the Rose Bowl this year.

== Schedule ==
Date	Opponent	Rank	Site	Result	Attendance	Source
September 22	Santa Clara*	No. 5	California Memorial Stadium; Berkeley, CA	W 34–0	44,000	
September 29	at No. 19 Penn*	No. 5	Franklin Field; Philadelphia, PA	W 35–0	60,000	
October 6	Minnesota*	No. 2	California Memorial Stadium; Berkeley, CA	W 55–14	69,000	
October 13	at Washington State	No. 2	Rogers Field; Pullman, WA	W 42–35	22,000	
October 20	No. 11 USC	No. 1	California Memorial Stadium; Berkeley, CA	L 14–21	81,490	
October 27	Oregon State	No. 9	California Memorial Stadium; Berkeley, CA	W 35–14	43,000	
November 3	at UCLA	No. 9	Los Angeles Memorial Coliseum; Los Angeles, CA (rivalry)	L 7–21	56,418	
November 10	Washington	No. 17	California Memorial Stadium; Berkeley, CA	W 37–28	46,000	
November 17	Oregon	No. 16	California Memorial Stadium; Berkeley, CA	W 28–26	23,000	
November 24	at No. 3 Stanford	No. 19	Stanford Stadium; Stanford, CA (Big Game)	W 20–7	90,000	
*Non-conference game; Rankings from AP Poll released prior to the game; Source:
