= Chuck Taylor (American football) =

American football player, coach, and administrator (1920–1994)

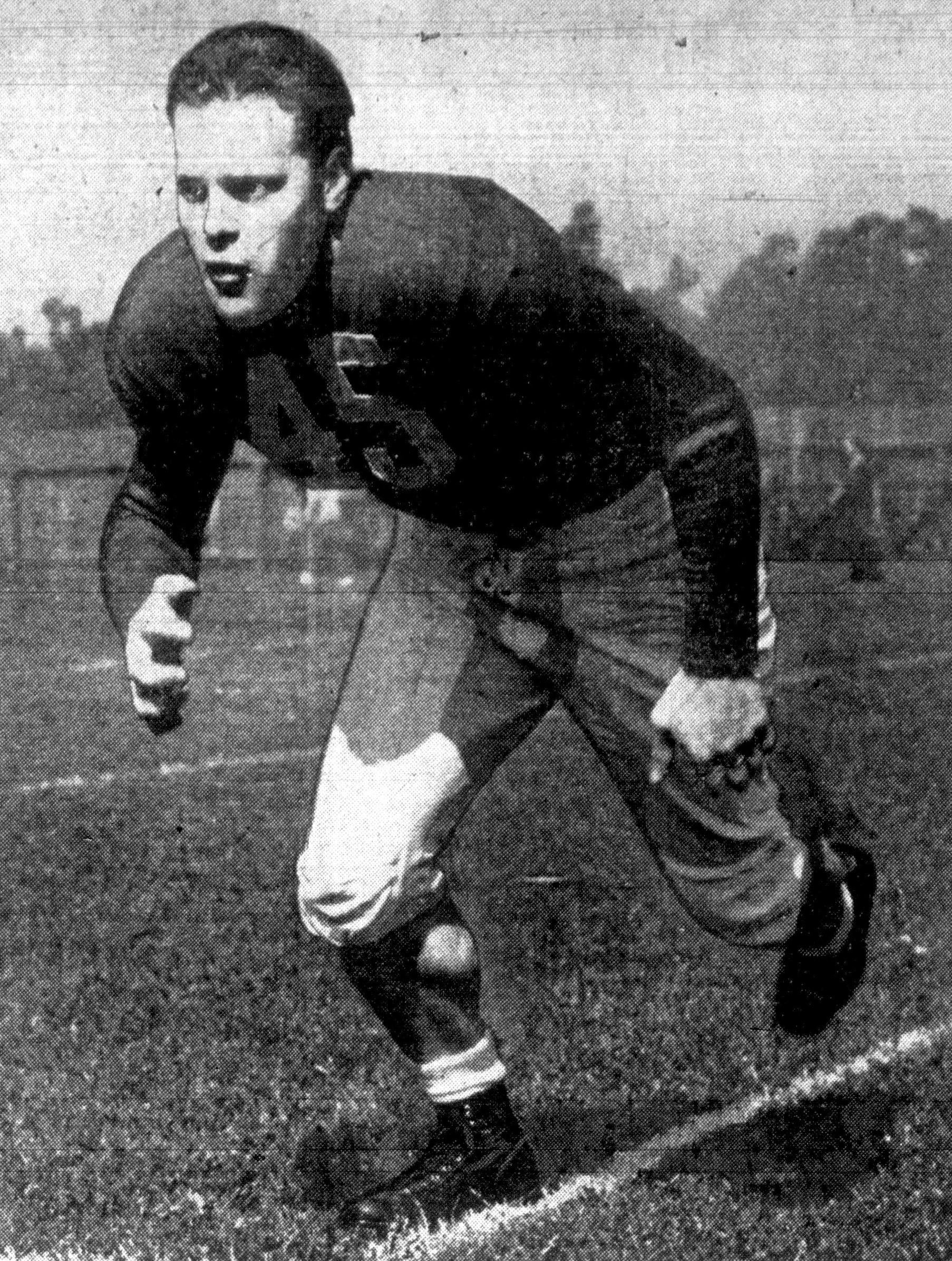
- Taylor, circa 1942

Biographical details
- Born: January 24, 1920; Portland, Oregon, U.S.
- Died: May 7, 1994 (aged 74); Stanford, California, U.S.

Playing career
- 1940–1942: Stanford
- 1946: Miami Seahawks
- Position: Guard

Coaching career (HC unless noted)
- 1948: Stanford (freshmen)
- 1949–1950: San Francisco 49ers (assistant)
- 1951–1957: Stanford

Administrative career (AD unless noted)
- 1963–1971: Stanford

Head coaching record
- Overall: 40–29–2
- Bowls: 0–1

Accomplishments and honors

Championships
- 1 PCC (1951)

Awards
- AFCA Coach of the Year (1951); Consensus All-American (1942); 2× First-team All-PCC (1941, 1942); Second-team All-PCC (1940)
- College Football Hall of Fame; Inducted in 1984 (profile)

Charles Albert Taylor (January 24, 1920 – May 7, 1994) was an American football player, coach, and college athletics administrator. He played college football at Stanford University from 1940 to 1942, returned as head football coach from 1951 to 1957, and served as the school's athletic director from 1963 to 1971. During his coaching tenure at Stanford, Taylor compiled a 40–29–2 record and led the Indians to the 1952 Rose Bowl his first season. That same season, at the age of 31, Taylor was named AFCA Coach of the Year, the youngest recipient of the award ever.

As a sophomore, Taylor was one of the "Wow Boys" on the undefeated 1940 Stanford Indians football team and played in Stanford's 1941 Rose Bowl victory over Nebraska. As a senior in 1942, he was an All-American guard. Taylor was selected 30th overall in the fourth round of the 1943 NFL draft by the Cleveland Rams.

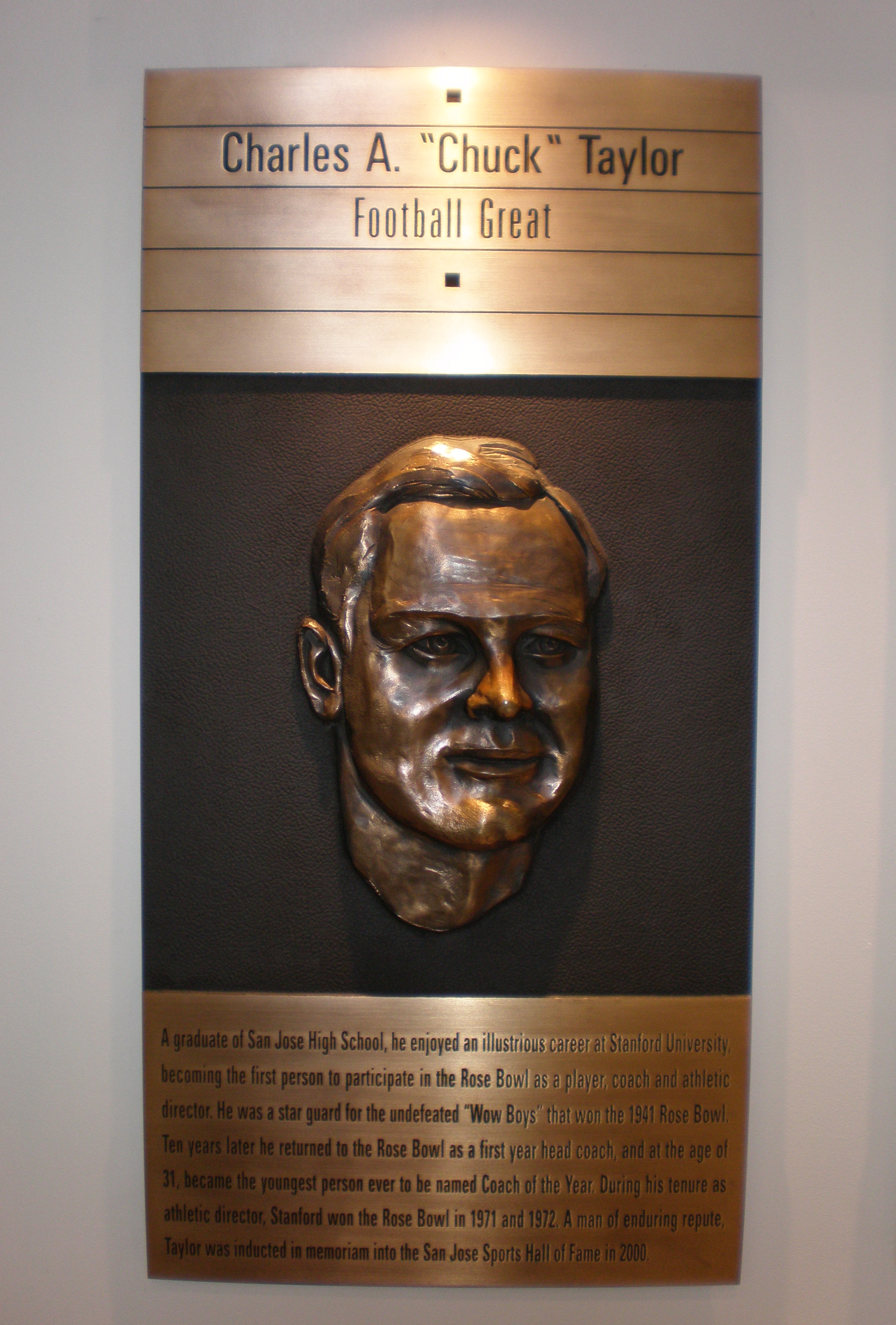
Taylor's plaque at the San Jose Sports Hall of Fame

By coaching his team to the 1952 Rose Bowl, Taylor became the second person to have participated in the Rose Bowl Game both as a player and a head coach. The first was Wallace Wade who played for Brown in the 1916 bowl game and coached Alabama in 1926, 1927 and 1931. Wade also coached Duke University in the Rose Bowl (1939 and 1941). Only six other men have accomplished this feat since Taylor.

After leaving coaching in 1957, Taylor returned to Stanford in 1963 as athletic director, where he served until 1971, when Stanford played in the 1971 Rose Bowl, giving him the distinction of being only one of two men who has participated in a Rose Bowl Game as a player, coach, and athletic director. The other man is Jess Hill of USC, who played in the 1930 Rose Bowl, coached in the 1953 and 1955 Rose Bowls, and was athletic director for the 1963, 1967, 1968, 1969, and 1970 Rose Bowls.

For many years Taylor and his wife also directed a camp for young people in the coastal range of Northern California near Santa Cruz, called Mountain Camp, where hundreds of young people enjoyed two-week sessions with unlimited recreation and character-building activities.

His youngest daughter, Janet Ann Taylor, was 21 when she was murdered near the Stanford campus on March 24, 1974. Confirmed serial killer John Getreu was convicted of her murder in September 2021.

== Head coaching record ==
Year	Team	Overall	Conference	Standing	Bowl/playoffs	Coaches^{#}	AP^{°}
Stanford Indians (Pacific Coast Conference) (1951–1957)
1951	Stanford	9–2	6–1	1st	L Rose	7	7
1952	Stanford	5–5	2–5	T–6th			
1953	Stanford	6–3–1	5–1–1	2nd		17	19
1954	Stanford	4–6	2–4	6th			
1955	Stanford	6–3–1	3–2–1	3rd		20	16
1956	Stanford	4–6	3–4	6th			
1957	Stanford	6–4	4–3	5th			
Stanford:		40–29–2	25–20–2				
Total:		40–29–2					
National championship Conference title Conference division title or championship game berth
^{#}Rankings from final Coaches Poll.; ^{°}Rankings from final AP Poll.
