= 1951 UCLA Bruins football team =

American college football season

1951 UCLA Bruins football
- Conference: Pacific Coast Conference

Ranking
- Coaches: No. 17
- AP: No. 17
- Record: 5–3–1 (4–1–1 PCC)
- Head coach: Red Sanders (3rd season)
- Offensive scheme: Single-wing
- Home stadium: Los Angeles Memorial Coliseum

1951 Pacific Coast Conference football standings
	Conf.					Overall
Team	W		L		T	W		L		T
No. 7 Stanford $	6	–	1	–	0	9	–	2	–	0
No. 17 UCLA	4	–	1	–	1	5	–	3	–	1
No. 12 California	5	–	2	–	0	8	–	2	–	0
USC	4	–	2	–	0	7	–	3	–	0
No. 18 Washington State	4	–	3	–	0	7	–	3	–	0
Oregon State	3	–	5	–	0	4	–	6	–	0
Washington	1	–	5	–	1	3	–	6	–	1
Oregon	1	–	6	–	0	2	–	8	–	0
Idaho	0	–	3	–	0	2	–	7	–	0
$ – Conference champion; Rankings from AP Poll

The 1951 UCLA Bruins football team represented the University of California, Los Angeles (UCLA) as a member of the Pacific Coast Conference (PCC) during the 1951 college football season. Led by third-year head coach Red Sanders, the Bruins compiled a record of 5–3–1 (4–1–1 in PCC, second).

== Schedule ==
Date	Opponent	Rank	Site	Result	Attendance	Source
September 21	No. 7 Texas A&M*		Los Angeles Memorial Coliseum; Los Angeles, CA	L 14–21	58,466–58,566	
September 29	at No. 10 Illinois*		Memorial Stadium; Champaign, IL	L 13–27	53,256	
October 6	Santa Clara*		Los Angeles Memorial Coliseum; Los Angeles, CA	W 44–17	18,640	
October 13	at No. 19 Stanford		Stanford Stadium; Stanford, CA	L 7–21	36,000	
October 20	Oregon		Los Angeles Memorial Coliseum; Los Angeles, CA	W 41–0	14,495	
November 3	No. 9 California		Los Angeles Memorial Coliseum; Los Angeles, CA (rivalry)	W 21–7	56,418	
November 10	at Oregon State		Multnomah Stadium; Portland, OR	W 7–0	26,598	
November 17	Washington	No. 18	Los Angeles Memorial Coliseum; Los Angeles, CA	T 20–20	31,597	
November 24	at No. 11 USC		Los Angeles Memorial Coliseum; Los Angeles, CA (Victory Bell)	W 21–7	71,738	
*Non-conference game; Rankings from AP Poll released prior to the game; Source:

== Game summaries ==
	1	2	3	4	Total
UCLA	7	0	7	7	21
USC	0	0	0	7	7

=== USC ===
For the first time, the Bruins defeated the Trojans in consecutive seasons. UCLA won the previous season's game 39–0. Scoring for the Bruins were Don Stalwick, Ike Jones, and Donn Moomaw. Late in the fourth quarter, Jim Sears scored for USC to avoid another shutout.
