= 1951 Texas A&M Aggies football team =

American college football season

1951 Texas A&M Aggies football
- Conference: Southwest Conference
- Record: 5–3–2 (1–3–2 SWC)
- Head coach: Raymond George (1st season)
- Home stadium: Kyle Field

1951 Southwest Conference football standings
	Conf.					Overall
Team	W		L		T	W		L		T
No. 11 TCU $	5	–	1	–	0	6	–	5	–	0
No. 9 Baylor	4	–	1	–	1	8	–	2	–	1
Texas	3	–	3	–	0	7	–	3	–	0
Rice	3	–	3	–	0	5	–	5	–	0
Texas A&M	1	–	3	–	2	5	–	3	–	2
Arkansas	2	–	4	–	0	5	–	5	–	0
SMU	1	–	4	–	1	3	–	6	–	1
$ – Conference champion; Rankings from AP poll

The 1951 Texas A&M Aggies football team represented Texas A&M University in the 1951 college football season as a member of the Southwest Conference (SWC). The Aggies were led by head coach Raymond George in his first season and finished with a record of five wins, three losses and two ties (5–3–2 overall, 1–3–2 in the SWC).

== Schedule ==
Date	Opponent	Rank	Site	Result	Attendance	Source
September 21	at UCLA*	No. 7	Los Angeles Memorial Coliseum; Los Angeles CA	W 21–14	58,466–58,566	
September 29	vs. Texas Tech*	No. 7	Cotton Bowl; Dallas, TX (rivalry)	W 20–7	27,000	
October 6	No. 4 Oklahoma*	No. 10	Kyle Field; College Station, TX	W 14–7	34,789–40,000	
October 13	at Trinity (TX)*	No. 4	Alamo Stadium; San Antonio, TX	W 53–14	12,401	
October 20	at TCU	No. 6	Amon G. Carter Stadium; Fort Worth, TX (rivalry)	L 14–20	34,000	
October 27	No. 7 Baylor	No. 16	Kyle Field; College Station, TX (rivalry)	T 21–21	40,000	
November 3	at Arkansas	No. 18	Razorback Stadium; Fayetteville, AR (rivalry)	L 21–33	20,500	
November 10	SMU		Kyle Field; College Station, TX	T 14–14	24,500	
November 17	at No. 19 Rice		Rice Stadium; Houston, TX	L 13–28	58,000	
November 29	No. 16 Texas		Kyle Field; College Station, TX (rivalry)	W 22–21	40,500	
*Non-conference game; Rankings from AP Poll released prior to the game

== Roster ==
- Yale Lary
