= 1951 Baylor Bears football team =

American college football season

1951 Baylor Bears football

Orange Bowl, L 14–17 vs. Georgia Tech
- Conference: Southwest Conference

Ranking
- Coaches: No. 9
- AP: No. 9
- Record: 8–2–1 (4–1–1 SWC)
- Head coach: George Sauer (2nd season)
- Captains: Gale Galloway; Stan Williams
- Home stadium: Baylor Stadium

1951 Southwest Conference football standings
	Conf.					Overall
Team	W		L		T	W		L		T
No. 11 TCU $	5	–	1	–	0	6	–	5	–	0
No. 9 Baylor	4	–	1	–	1	8	–	2	–	1
Texas	3	–	3	–	0	7	–	3	–	0
Rice	3	–	3	–	0	5	–	5	–	0
Texas A&M	1	–	3	–	2	5	–	3	–	2
Arkansas	2	–	4	–	0	5	–	5	–	0
SMU	1	–	4	–	1	3	–	6	–	1
$ – Conference champion; Rankings from AP poll

The 1951 Baylor Bears football team represented Baylor University as a member of the Southwest Conference (SWC) during the 1951 college football season. Led by second-year head coach George Sauer, the Bears compiled an overall record of 8–2–1 with a mark of 4–1–1 in conference play, placing second in the SWC. They were ranked No. 9 in both the final AP Poll and the final Coaches Poll. Baylor was invited to the Orange Bowl, where the Bears lost to Georgia Tech.

Four players—quarterback Larry Isbell, end Stan Williams, guard Bill Athey, and tackle Ken Casner—were recognized on the 1951 College Football All-America Team.

== Schedule ==
Date	Opponent	Rank	Site	Result	Attendance	Source
September 22	at Houston*	No. 13	Rice Stadium; Houston, TX (rivalry)	W 19–0	55,000–60,000	
October 6	at Tulane*	No. 19	Tulane Stadium; New Orleans, LA	W 27–14	40,000	
October 13	Arkansas	No. 12	Baylor Stadium; Waco, TX	W 9–7	25,000	
October 20	Texas Tech*	No. 10	Baylor Stadium; Waco, TX (rivalry)	W 40–20	22,000	
October 27	at No. 16 Texas A&M	No. 7	Kyle Field; College Station, TX (rivalry)	T 21–21	40,000	
November 3	TCU^{†}	No. 8	Baylor Stadium; Waco, TX (rivalry)	L 7–20	37,000	
November 10	at No. 10 Texas	No. 16	Memorial Stadium; Austin, TX (rivalry)	W 18–6	58,000	
November 17	Wake Forest*	No. 10	Baylor Stadium; Waco, TX	W 42–0	20,000	
November 24	SMU	No. 10	Baylor Stadium; Waco, TX	W 14–13	30,000	
December 1	at Rice	No. 9	Rice Stadium; Houston, TX	W 34–13	45,000	
January 1	vs. No. 5 Georgia Tech*	No. 9	Burdine Stadium; Miami, FL (Orange Bowl)	L 14–17	65,837	
*Non-conference game; ^{†}Homecoming; Rankings from AP Poll released prior to the game
