= 1951 Oregon State Beavers football team =

American college football season

1951 Oregon State Beavers football
- Head coach Kip Taylor
- Conference: Pacific Coast Conference
- Record: 4–6 (3–5 PCC)
- Head coach: Kip Taylor (3rd season)
- Captain: John Thomas
- Home stadium: Bell Field; Multnomah Stadium

1951 Pacific Coast Conference football standings
	Conf.					Overall
Team	W		L		T	W		L		T
No. 7 Stanford $	6	–	1	–	0	9	–	2	–	0
No. 17 UCLA	4	–	1	–	1	5	–	3	–	1
No. 12 California	5	–	2	–	0	8	–	2	–	0
USC	4	–	2	–	0	7	–	3	–	0
No. 18 Washington State	4	–	3	–	0	7	–	3	–	0
Oregon State	3	–	5	–	0	4	–	6	–	0
Washington	1	–	5	–	1	3	–	6	–	1
Oregon	1	–	6	–	0	2	–	8	–	0
Idaho	0	–	3	–	0	2	–	7	–	0
$ – Conference champion; Rankings from AP Poll

The 1951 Oregon State Beavers football team represented Oregon State College as a member of the Pacific Coast Conference (PCC) during the 1951 college football season. Led by third-year head coach Kip Taylor, the Beavers compiled an overall record of 4–6 with a mark of 3–5 in conference play, placing sixth in the PCC. The Beavers scored 204 points and allowed 180 points on the season. The team finished the season ranked at No. 25 in the 1951 Litkenhous Ratings.

The season was played under the NCAA's unlimited substitution rules, which made the two-platoon system practicable.

== Schedule ==
Date	Opponent	Rank	Site	Result	Attendance	Source
September 22	at No. 2 Michigan State*		Macklin Stadium; East Lansing, MI	L 0–6	33,373	
September 29	Utah*		Bell Field; Corvallis, OR	W 61–28	9,000–10,000	
October 6	vs. Idaho	No. 15	Memorial Stadium; Spokane, WA	W 34–6	8,000	
October 13	at No. 14 USC	No. 18	Los Angeles Memorial Coliseum; Los Angeles, CA	L 14–16	36,400	
October 20	Washington State		Bell Field; Corvallis, OR	L 13–26	15,500	
October 27	at No. 9 California		California Memorial Stadium; Berkeley, CA	L 14–35	43,000	
November 3	at Washington		Husky Stadium; Seattle, WA	W 40–14	33,500	
November 10	UCLA		Multnomah Stadium; Portland, OR	L 0–7	26,598	
November 17	at No. 4 Stanford		Stanford Stadium; Stanford, CA	L 14–35	40,000	
November 24	at Oregon		Hayward Field; Eugene, OR (Civil War)	W 14–7	19,007	
*Non-conference game; Rankings from AP Poll released prior to the game

== Background ==
Spring drills for the 1951 college football season opened for the Oregon State College Beavers on Monday, April 2, with head coach Kip Taylor and his three assistants — line coach Len Younce, backfield coach Bump Elliott, and freshman head coach Hal Moe — on hand to drill an expected 100 prospects for the fall season. The team's first practice was completely open to any OSC student, regardless of previous football experience. Although the Pacific Coast Conference allowed only 30 days of spring practice, coach Taylor scheduled 36 sessions for the team, noting that Oregon's fickle spring weather was apt to force the cancellation of at least six dates. Spring practice was set to terminate on May 12, with the playing of the annual intersquad game, pitting the Grays against the Blues.

The 1951 season was the first in which OSC included black players on its varsity football team. Sophomores Dave Mann and Bill Anderson both started at halfback during the year.

Ultimately, 65 hopefuls attended the first practice session, including 18 returning lettermen from the 1950 OSC team and more than 30 candidates from the 1950 freshman team. Included among these were two African-American halfbacks, Dave Mann and Bill Anderson — the first black players to lace them up for an Oregon State varsity team.

Anderson and Mann were quick to make their presence known, each scoring rushing touchdowns and heralded as stars of the team's first full-length regulation scrimmage, between a squad headed by Len Younce and newly hired ends coach Butch Morse and another led by Hal Moe and Bump Taylor. Anderson was particularly electrifying, sending the estimated 2,000 people gathered to their feet with a spectacular 93-yard touchdown gallop in the third quarter.

Tales of the pair's gridiron exploits made their way up and down the coast, with one columnist for the Los Angeles Times alerting Southern California fans that the "two Oakland Negroes" were "rated as sophomore halfback whizzes" and being added to Kip Taylor's complete returning backfield of starters for the 1951 season.

== Weekly action ==
=== Week 1: Michigan State Spartans ===
Program for the 1951 opening game at Michigan State College.

Oregon State College began the 1951 season with one of the toughest opening game tests in school history — traveling to East Lansing, Michigan, to take on the preseason #2 ranked Michigan State College Spartans.

The scheduling of MSC, not a traditional opponent of Pacific Coast Conference teams, might seem perplexing. The match-up was not attributable to third-year head coach and former Michigan Wolverine Kip Taylor, however, since the two teams had met annually ever since 1948, when Lon Stiner coached the Beavers. The 1951 meeting was the second consecutive season-opener between OSC and MSC and was again spotlighted as "Game of the Week" and telecast nationally by ABC and by radio via the Mutual Network.

Whereas in 1950 Michigan State had crushed OSC by 25 points, the 1951 contest would be a close one, decided by a trick play run by MSC from the one-yard line in the second quarter. The Beavers' best chance to score came in the second half, when they returned the kick and proceeded to reel off five consecutive first downs driving the ball to the Spartans' 14-yard line, only to throw a goal line interception.

The real hero of the day, however, was "21-year-old Negro" Jimmy Ellis, "a long-limbed fleet sophomore from Saginaw," who picked off three Beaver passes, including a goal line grab that stopped the first drive of the second half, earning himself a game ball from Spartan head coach Biggie Munn.

The game was played evenly, with the Spartans out-gaining the Beavers, 215 yards to 207. Oregon State made 15 first downs to 14 for Michigan State. MSC was extremely sloppy on the day, fumbling the ball a total of eight times, but would improve throughout the 1951 campaign, finishing the year ranked No. 2, with an undefeated 9–0 record and a claim to the national championship.

=== Week 2: Utah Redskins ===
Cover of the 1951 football media guide featured senior end and team captain John Thomas.

The friendly confines of Bell Field, an undersized and out-of-date 22,000 seat venue for which replacement fundraising had begun, would be the location of Oregon State's second game, against the visiting Utah Redskins. Utah was coming into the game confident, the beneficiaries of an 82–13 scoring differential against their first two opponents of the season, Montana State and Arizona. In Corvallis they would be put on the other side of a lopsided score by Oregon State College.

Records would fall in the 61–28 mismatch. The Beavers set a new high water mark with 703 net yards gained in a game that was essentially over by halftime, with the Beavers holding a 28–6 lead at the intermission.

Fullback Sam Baker scored three touchdowns, with halfbacks Dave Mann and Ralph Carr adding two each to the total. Reserve backs Ken Brown and Bill Anderson added one touchdown each, with defensive end and placekicker Jim Cordial putting seven of the nine points-after-touchdown through the goal posts.

Dave Mann was particularly spectacular, amassing 233 yards with just 11 carries, a new Bell Field record, shattering the old mark of 190 set by Ken Carpenter in 1949. A total of 616 yards rushing were gained by the Beavers in their dominant performance, with an additional 87 yards gained passing out of coach Kip Taylor's single wing offense.

Oregon State's tight battle on national television with No. 2 Michigan State and massive win over Utah earned the Beavers recognition among the country's sportswriters and OSC made their appearance in the national AP poll with a No. 15 ranking in the first poll of the 1951 season.

=== Week 3: Idaho Vandals ===
Idaho halfback Glen Christian (63) is tracked down by OSC defensive halfback Bill West (40) at the end of a 9-yard passing play.

Memorial Stadium in Spokane, Washington, provided a neutral-field venue for the Week 3 matchup between OSC and the Idaho Vandals. In a sparsely-attended contest Oregon State powered past Idaho by a score of 34 to 6.

Scoring was opened up in the first quarter on a 30-yard interception returned to the end zone by defensive end Jim Cordial. Idaho was able to put points on the board with their only score of the day, later in the first period, but long OSC scoring drives of 77 and 53 yards soon tilted the balance. A 38-yard touchdown reception by Mann on a pass from quarterback Gene Morrow nailing shut Idaho's coffin late in the second quarter, with the Beavers opened up an insurmountable halftime 26–6 lead.

The Beavers were 9-for-9 passing in the first half, with the arm of star left halfback Dave Mann on full display, and extended their completion streak to 10 with the first pass after intermission before missing on their next two throws. The team would connect on only 1 of their last 11 throws, finishing the afternoon a rather pedestrian 11-for-21 passing.

OSC rested its starters for most of the second half against an overmatched Idaho team, but still managed to score on a short run by fullback Bob Redkey. The Beavers' pass defense was stellar, picking off a total of 7 Vandal passes.

The Beavers outgained the Vandals by 309 yards to 175 yards on the day.

=== Week 4: USC Trojans ===
Despite a close loss to Michigan State in the opener and two resounding victories against lesser opponents, the Oregon State College Beavers fell to No. 18 in the second weekly Associated Press college football poll. Next on the agenda was a trip to the Rose Bowl in Pasadena, California for a battle with the USC Trojans, a team coming off an impressive victory over the Washington Huskies.

Star of the 1951 USC team was left halfback Frank Gifford, a future NFL Hall of Famer.

OSC took a quick lead in the first quarter when defensive end Jim Cordial blocked a USC punt, with the Beavers recovering the ball on the 32-yard line. Beaver halfback Dave Mann broke off a 14-yard run, followed shortly after by a critical Trojan roughness penalty that brought the ball to the 1-yard line. Fullback Sam Baker plowed over the goal line on the next play and Cordial converted on the kick, putting the Beavers ahead 7–0.

One minute later, following an OSC kickoff, USC halfback Frank Gifford was hit hard by 235-pound defensive guard Jim Clark and fumbled the ball, with the Beavers recovering on the 11. The brief red zone drive was capped by an 8-yard touchdown pass from quarterback Gene Morrow to end John Thomas.

The Trojans scored an answering touchdown in the second quarter but missed the conversion, leaving the score 14–6 at the half. Gifford led USC on a 43-yard drive during their second possession of the third quarter, capped with a 10-yard pass by him to right halfback Bob Buckley to make the score 14–13. The legality of Gifford's pass was questioned, with some observers believing he was beyond the line of scrimmage when the throw was made.

The tie was broken later in that quarter by an OSC strategic error when head coach Kip Taylor called a fake Sam Baker punt 4th-and-10 and deep in their own end. Baker was tackled short of the first down marker, setting the Trojans for what would prove the game-winning field goal by Gifford, the final score in the 16–13 game. After the game, Coach Taylor indicated that he would take "full responsibility" for the ill-conceived fake punt call.

=== Week 5: Washington State Cougars ===
Junior WSC end Ed Barker, a future first round NFL draft pick, reeled in TD passes of 67 and 56 yards to beat OSC on October 20.

Despite two convincing wins and two tough losses, Oregon State fell out of the national Top 20 rankings following the USC game, never to reascend in the 1951 season. Next on the slate would be a game with OSC's sister school to the north, the Washington State College Cougars. The experience would not be edifying.

The game was reckoned as a toss-up going in, with both the 2–2 Cougars and 2–2 Beavers running the "Michigan single wing" offense.

The first half was played in Corvallis in front of a homecoming crowd of 15,500. The two state land-grant schools of the Pacific Northwest matched one another touchdown-for-touchdown during the first half, each missing a point-after-touchdown kick, for a 13–13 halftime score.

After intermission WSC quarterback Bob Burkhart connected for the second time in the game with end Ed Barker on a long touchdown pass, followed shortly thereafter by a 44-yard drive culminating in touchdown plunge by back Jim Head, doubling up OSC on the scoreboard and putting the game out of reach. Barker would go on to become a first round draft pick in the 1953 NFL draft.

For the game, OSC outgained the home team on the ground, 222 yards to 194. The passing battle was not close, however, with the Beavers mustering just 61 yards through the air on 4 completions, while the Cougars went 8-for-20 for 229 yards, powered by the Burkhart-to-Barker connection for two long scores. The loss effectively eliminated Oregon State from contention for a Pacific Coast Conference title in 1951.

=== Week 6: California Golden Bears ===
Cal right halfback Bill Powell broke a school record with a 98-yard run to seal the Bears' Week 6 win over the Beavers.

The Beavers again hit the road for their Week 6 contest with the California Golden Bears. It would be a game in which the defending Pacific Coast champions — smarting after the previous week's loss to the USC Trojans, the first in four seasons — got healthy against the visitors from the north in front of 43,000 fans.

The game was never close, with the Bears racking up four touchdowns in the first half, going to the break in firm control with a 28–0 lead. "The Beavers, apparently having an off day, fumbled, stumbled, and generally played into the Bears' hands in the first half," an Associated Press reporter observed.

The third period featured the play of the game, a 98-yard gallop by Cal right halfback Bill Powell — the longest run in California Golden Bears football history — putting the game well out of reach for Kip Taylor's squad. Oregon State was finally able to score to avoid the shutout after ten minutes had been played in the fourth quarter. The touchdown was the first scored by the Beavers against Cal since the teams played in 1947. A second touchdown was logged in the waning minutes with a 54-yard punt return to the Cal 6-yard like by OSC's Gene Taft, which set up a Sam Baker run.

The Bears racked up an astounding 421 yards rushing against a porous Beaver defense in the game. Conversely, OSC was largely unable to run the ball against the stout Cal defense, generating just 54 yards on the ground. This was mitigated to some extent by an 18-for-31 passing day, but 4 interceptions and 2 fumbles took their toll, sending OSC to the resounding loss and a 2–4 record.

=== Week 7: Washington Huskies ===
Norman Rockwell-style kitsch art was featured on the program for the Washington Husky game.

With their 1951 season sputtering, the 2–4 Beavers made their way to Seattle to do battle with the 3–3 Washington Huskies, who starred future NFL Hall of Fame running back Hugh McElhenny.

A crowd of 33,500 braved a damp and chilly day in anticipation of a Husky victory. The Huskies opened the game strong with a 79-yard drive, which stalled on the OSC 15 yard line. Scoring was opened by the Beavers in the second quarter, with fullback Sam Baker carrying the ball again and again out of Kip Taylor's single wing offense, gaining 42 yards in the team's 60 yard scoring drive. Washington evened the score soon after with a drive culminating in a two-yard scoring run.

The muddy field, soaked by overnight rain, was no problem for Sam Baker and the Beaver backfield, however, and in the third quarter OSC broke the game open with three touchdowns, adding two more in the final period. Baker finished the day with 124 yards gained on 27 carries, with three touchdowns, while reserve fullback Jack Pinion added two more. Halfback Bill Anderson, predicted to miss the game because of injury, also was able to find paydirt on a 3-yard run in the contest.

Washington was able to keep the route from devolving into a laugher with a 38-yards scoring pass from quarterback Sam Mitchell to Bill Albright. The Husky passing advantage of 159 yards gained to 15 was more than offset by Oregon State's domination on the ground, outgaining Washington 396 to 117. Turnovers were again pivotal, with both teams throwing 4 interceptions and Washington fumbling away the ball 3 times to OSC's 1. Despite winning big, it seems likely that OSC set some sort of unofficial school record for interceptions thrown on this day, issuing its astounding 4 picks as part a miserable 2-for-7 passing day.

Head coach Kip Taylor was carried from the field by his players after the win — the fourth straight by the Beavers over the Huskies in Seattle.

=== Week 8: UCLA Bruins ===
The November 10 game against UCLA held in Portland was one of just three Beaver home games in 1951. OSC lost in the mud, 7–0.

Portland's Multnomah Stadium was the venue for Oregon State's Week 8 matchup with the UCLA Bruins. Once again, Mother Nature made her presence known in the Pacific Northwest, creating what one visiting journalist called "the worst field known here in four years, slippery and sloppy from two days of continuous rain.

Coached by Henry "Red" Sanders, the Bruins mirrored Oregon State in adherence to a run-oriented single wing offense and featured Paul Cameron at left halfback ("tailback"). Benefiting from "the worst rash of injuries in the memory of any Pacific Coast Conference team since the war," the sophomore Cameron had started the 1951 season as UCLA's fifth string tailback but had emerged sensationally in a massive 41–0 shutout of Oregon and an unlikely upset of No. 9 Cal.

With about five minutes remaining in the first period, Cameron threw a five-yard pass to right halfback ("wingback") Pete Dailey for what would be the game's only touchdown. The play capped off a 69-yard scoring drive for UCLA. The extra point attempt was mishandled, but holder Don Stalwick picked up the ball and scooted around the left side for a one-point conversion on the ground, making the score 7–0 for the visitors. There it would remain.

The tight game was not without drama, as the visiting reporter from the Los Angeles Times noted the Orangemen feature a "great fullback in Sam Baker, who played his heart out here today," speedy tailback Dave Mann, and "the biggest line on the Pacific coast." UCLA did their part to keep the OSC running attack bogged in the mud, however, limited the Beavers to just 86 yards on the ground, to go with 113 yards through the air on 9-for-25 passing. Mann was particularly ineffective, held to negative-4 yards on 5 carries.

OSC again killed their chances with turnovers, fumbling the ball away three times and giving it away twice more on interceptions — markedly different than the Bruins, who played a turnover-free game. With the loss OSC fell to 3–5 on the season.

After the game, Bruin head coach Sanders, recovering from surgery to repair a torn Achilles tendon, gave Oregon State their flowers: "Thank heavens we don't have to play Oregon State again tomorrow," he said. "I've been dreading this game for a solid year.... I knew we were in for a tough afternoon when we first started out on the field.... I heard them as they started storming through the door and stood back as they charged past. Coach Kip Taylor had them so steamed up that I though I was in a roundhouse full of runaway switch engines. Scared me so bad I almost fell off my crutches. Oregon State is a fine ball club both offensively and defensively and it wouldn't surprise me too much to see them knock off [undefeated] Stanford next week."

=== Week 9: Stanford Indians ===
Program for the November 17 game at the No. 4-ranked Stanford Indians.

On the heels of a win over Southern California the previous week, the Stanford Indians faced a potential "trap game" against the Beavers of Oregon State — Stanford entered the game a 13-point favorite with the gambling set. Fortunately for the tribe, motivation was provided by a Pacific Coast Conference title and bid to the 1952 Rose Bowl game that awaited should they post a ninth consecutive win.

Oregon State played Stanford tough in the first half, matching an 11-play, 55-yard touchdown drive by the home team with a 71-yard drive of their own, climaxed by a 24-yard touchdown pass out of the single wing from quarterback Gene Morrow to end Dwayne Helbig. The teams went to the locker room for halftime intermission tied 7–7, with the Beavers, the largest offensive team in the Pacific Coast Conference, hopeful of pulling off the upset.

Instead, OSC found themselves on the receiving end of a butt-kicking, as Stanford poured on three quick touchdowns in the third quarter — the first following a fumble recovery deep in the Beavers' end, the second off an errant Dave Mann pass, and the third shortly after another bad Beaver pass. The visitors managed to cut the lead to 28–14 with a hard Sam Baker run in a fourth-and-goal situation. The Indians tacked on a final touchdown with just 10 seconds remaining in the game after a dispiriting 75-yard drive.

Stanford outplayed Oregon State in every facet, out-gaining the Beavers 243 yards to 140 on the ground, and 176 to 92 in the air. The Beavers were just 7-for-24 with 3 interceptions passing the ball.

The delighted crowd, estimated at 40,000, was about double the number expected for a typical Oregon State contest, according to one local journalist. He neatly summarized the blowout: "Although the big and eager Beavers were rough and large physically, they lacked Stanford's nimbleness both of foot and brain — and when it came to pass defense, at times they made at times they made quarterback Gary Kerkorian and end Bill McColl look like the All-American battery they are."

=== Week 10: Oregon Ducks ===
The right side of the 1951 OSC defensive line was anchored by Hawaiian brothers Herman and Jim Clark, both of whom were drafted by the NFL after the season.

Hayward Field in Eugene was the scene for the 55th annual scrum for state football supremacy — the Civil War game. Oregon State had played a tough schedule, facing three ranked opponents on the road, but had ultimately come up lacking, failing to pull off any big upsets and languishing with a 3–6 record. Their friendly rivals located 47 miles south, the University of Oregon had even greater cause for complaint, entering the finale with a record of just 2–7.

Oregon jumped out to a 7–0 lead on a 19-yard trap play run up the middle by fullback Bob Ashworth.

The historic highlight of the game came when Oregon quarterback and defensive safety George Shaw intercepted a pass in the closing minutes of the first half — his record-setting 13th pick of the season. Shaw's interception broke the NCAA record of 12 set the previous year by defensive back Hank Rich of Arizona State College.

The Webfoots' 7–0 lead held all the way through the third quarter, which came to a close with OSC having driven the ball 71 yards to the Oregon 2 yard line. On the opening play of the final quarter, star Beaver fullback Sam Baker blasted the ball into the end zone, with kicker Jim Cordial kicking the extra point to equalize. This was followed a few minutes later with the winning Beaver score — a run around left end by OSC reserve fullback Jack Pinion. Cordial's extra point attempt was wide but the Ducks were offside on the play and coach Kip Taylor elected to run for the extra point placed half the distance to the goal. Sam Baker again did honors on the short run, for what would prove to be a final score of 14–7.

The Beavers were once again hamstrung by their own mistakes, kept from scoring twice by interceptions and once by a Sam Baker fumble at the 4-yard line. Despite his mistake, working behind "a beefy line that gradually wore down the Oregon defense," OSC's "Slammin' Sam" Baker was the unquestioned star of the game, turning in his best performance of 1951 — 30 carries for 159 yards rushing.

Oregon State dominated on the ground, outgaining Oregon 277 yards to 80, while the Beaver aerial assault was again nearly nonexistent, with the Ducks going 12-for-29 for 146 yards to just 2-for-11 passing with 2 interceptions for just 19 yards by the Beavers.

== Season highlights ==
The Beavers compiled an overall record of 4–6 with a mark of 3–5 in conference play, placing sixth in the PCC.

Fullback Sam Baker finished the 1951 season with 808 yards rushing and scored 67 points, both school records. He would also set the Oregon state record for most runs in a single season (180). Baker would eventually amass 1,947 yards rushing during his three years on the OSC varsity, also a school record. He would have a 15-year career in the NFL, during which he would be named to the NFL All-Pro team in 1966 and make four appearances in the Pro Bowl.

Left halfback Dave Mann would set OSC records for most net yards rushing in a single game (233) and for average yards per carry in a single game (21.2). Mann's net yardage total would remain tops in Oregon State history for 27 years. His average yards per carry in a single game (minimum of 10 attempts) still stands.

The teams 616 yards rushing and 9.5 yards per carry average in Mann's record-setting game against Utah also represented school records.

Despite ending the 1951 season with a losing record, Oregon State finished ranked No. 25 in the 1951 Litkenhous Ratings.

== Roster ==
Quarterbacks
• 25 - Art Charette (Sophomoree)
• 26 - Chuck Brackett (Sophomore)
• 27 - Gene Morrow (Senior) *

Halfbacks
• 11 - Ken Brown (Sophomore)
• 12 - Ralph Carr (Senior)
• 14 - Bill Sheffold (Senior)
• 16 - Jack Peterson (Sophomore) *
• 20 - Derald Jenkins (Freshman)
• 38 - Bill Anderson (Sophomore)
• 40 - Bill West (Freshman)
• 44 - Dave Mann (Sophomore) * †
• 46 - Gene Taft (Senior)
• 47 - Kaye Booth (Sophomore)
• 48 - Bob Cornelison (Senior)

Fullbacks
• 13 - Bob Redkey (Junior)
• 33 - Jack Pinion (Sophomore)
• 35 - Tom Little (Senior)
• 36 - Sam Baker (Junior) * †

Ends
• 80 - Jim Cordial (Senior)
• 81 - Claret Taylor (Sophomore)
• 82 - Don Bradley (Senior)
• 83 - Dick Skiles (Senior)
• 84 - Don Nibblett (Senior)
• 85 - Jack Gotta (Sophomore)
• 86 - Dwane Helbig (Sophomore) *
• 90 - John Thomas (Senior, captain) * †
• 91 - Bill Storey (Junior)

Tackles
• 68 - Cal Moore (Junior)
• 70 - Ernie Madsen (Junior)
• 71 - Dave Schmidt (Sophomore)
• 72 - Doug Hogland (Junior) * †
• 73 - Bill Farnham (Senior)
• 77 - Herman Clark (Senior) * †
• 78 - John Perrott (Sophomore)
• 79 - Jim Luster (Sophomore)
• 94 - Ed Ritt (Freshman)
• 95 - John Witte (Freshman)

Guards
• 50 - Glenn Guyer (Freshman)
• 60 - Yale Rohlff (Senior)
• 61 - C. Womack (Junior)
• 62 - Fred Burri (Senior)
• 63 - Jim Clark (Senior) * †
• 64 - Wes Hogland (Senior)
• 65 - LaVerne Ferguson (Sophomore)
• 66 - Jim Roberts (Sophomore)
• 74 - Don Zarosinski (Senior) *
• 75 - Jerry Wilson (Junior)

Centers
• 24 - Cub Houck (Senior)
• 52 - Jim Norton (Junior)
• 53 - Fred Sutherland (Senior)
• 55 - Pete Palmer (Senior) *

Kicker
• Jim Cordial

Punters
• Dave Mann, Sam Baker

Opening day starters marked with *
Eventual NFL draft pick marked with †
Source: Bob Rubin (ed.), The California Gridiron: Oregon State vs. California, October 27, 1951, (Berkeley: Associated Students, University of California), vol. 19, no. 4 (Oct. 27, 1951), p. 10.

== Players selected in the 1952 NFL draft ==
Player	Position	Round	Pick	NFL club
Herman Clark	Tackle	4	44	Chicago Bears
Jim Clark	Guard	5	55	Washington Redskins
John Thomas	End	7	77	Philadelphia Eagles
Sam Baker	Kicker/Fullback	11	133	Los Angeles Rams
