= 1951 Rice Owls football team =

American college football season

1951 Rice Owls football
- Conference: Southwest Conference
- Record: 5–5 (3–3 SWC)
- Head coach: Jess Neely (12th season)
- Home stadium: Rice Stadium

1951 Southwest Conference football standings
	Conf.					Overall
Team	W		L		T	W		L		T
No. 11 TCU $	5	–	1	–	0	6	–	5	–	0
No. 9 Baylor	4	–	1	–	1	8	–	2	–	1
Texas	3	–	3	–	0	7	–	3	–	0
Rice	3	–	3	–	0	5	–	5	–	0
Texas A&M	1	–	3	–	2	5	–	3	–	2
Arkansas	2	–	4	–	0	5	–	5	–	0
SMU	1	–	4	–	1	3	–	6	–	1
$ – Conference champion; Rankings from AP poll

The 1951 Rice Owls football team represented Rice Institute during the 1951 college football season. The Owls were led by 12th-year head coach Jess Neely and played their home games at Rice Stadium in Houston, Texas. The team competed as members of the Southwest Conference, finishing tied for third.

== Schedule ==
Date	Opponent	Rank	Site	Result	Attendance	Source
September 29	Clemson*		Rice Stadium; Houston, TX	L 14–20	35,000	
October 6	at LSU*		Tiger Stadium; Baton Rouge, LA	L 6–7	44,000	
October 13	Navy*		Rice Stadium; Houston, TX	W 21–14	58,000	
October 20	at No. 15 SMU		Cotton Bowl; Dallas, TX (rivalry)	W 28–7	53,000	
October 27	at No. 10 Texas		Memorial Stadium; Austin, TX (rivalry)	L 6–14	50,000	
November 3	Pittsburgh*		Rice Stadium; Houston, TX	W 21–13	26,000	
November 10	No. 20 Arkansas		Rice Stadium; Houston, TX	W 6–0		
November 17	Texas A&M	No. 19	Rice Stadium; Houston, TX	W 28–13	58,000	
November 24	at TCU	No. 18	Amon G. Carter Stadium; Fort Worth, TX	L 6–22	25,000	
December 1	No. 9 Baylor		Rice Stadium; Houston, TX	L 13–34	45,000	
*Non-conference game; Rankings from AP Poll released prior to the game
