= 1951 SMU Mustangs football team =

American college football season

1951 SMU Mustangs football
- Conference: Southwest Conference
- Record: 3–6–1 (1–4–1 SWC)
- Head coach: Rusty Russell (2nd season)
- Captains: Dick Hightower; Herschel Forester; Pat Knight
- Home stadium: Cotton Bowl

1951 Southwest Conference football standings
	Conf.					Overall
Team	W		L		T	W		L		T
No. 11 TCU $	5	–	1	–	0	6	–	5	–	0
No. 9 Baylor	4	–	1	–	1	8	–	2	–	1
Texas	3	–	3	–	0	7	–	3	–	0
Rice	3	–	3	–	0	5	–	5	–	0
Texas A&M	1	–	3	–	2	5	–	3	–	2
Arkansas	2	–	4	–	0	5	–	5	–	0
SMU	1	–	4	–	1	3	–	6	–	1
$ – Conference champion; Rankings from AP poll

The 1951 SMU Mustangs football team represented Southern Methodist University (SMU) as a member of the Southwest Conference (SWC) during the 1951 college football season. Led by second-year head coach Rusty Russell, the Mustangs compiled an overall record of 3–6–1 with a mark of 1–4–1 in conference play, placing last out of seven teams in the SWC. SMU played home games at the Cotton Bowl in Dallas. Dick Hightower, Herschel Forester, Pat Knight were the team captains.

== Schedule ==
Date	Opponent	Rank	Site	Result	Attendance	Source
September 22	at Georgia Tech*		Grant Field; Atlanta, GA	L 7–21	33,000	
September 29	at No. 3 Ohio State*		Ohio Stadium; Columbus, OH	L 0–7	80,735	
October 6	Missouri*		Cotton Bowl; Dallas, TX	W 34–0	40,000	
October 13	at No. 5 Notre Dame*		Notre Dame Stadium; Notre Dame, IN	W 27–20	58,240	
October 20	Rice	No. 15	Cotton Bowl; Dallas, TX (rivalry)	L 7–28	53,000	
November 3	No. 12 Texas		Cotton Bowl; Dallas, TX	L 13–20	72,000	
November 10	at Texas A&M		Kyle Field; College Station, TX	T 14–14	24,500	
November 17	Arkansas		Cotton Bowl; Dallas, TX	W 47–7	33,500	
November 24	at No. 10 Baylor		Baylor Stadium; Waco, TX	L 13–14	30,000	
December 1	at No. 11 TCU		Amon G. Carter Stadium; Fort Worth, TX (rivalry)	L 2–13	35,000	
*Non-conference game; Rankings from AP Poll released prior to the game
