= 1951 Texas Longhorns football team =

American college football season

1951 Texas Longhorns football
- Conference: Southwest Conference
- Record: 7–3 (3–3 SWC)
- Head coach: Ed Price (1st season)
- Home stadium: Memorial Stadium

1951 Southwest Conference football standings
	Conf.					Overall
Team	W		L		T	W		L		T
No. 11 TCU $	5	–	1	–	0	6	–	5	–	0
No. 9 Baylor	4	–	1	–	1	8	–	2	–	1
Texas	3	–	3	–	0	7	–	3	–	0
Rice	3	–	3	–	0	5	–	5	–	0
Texas A&M	1	–	3	–	2	5	–	3	–	2
Arkansas	2	–	4	–	0	5	–	5	–	0
SMU	1	–	4	–	1	3	–	6	–	1
$ – Conference champion; Rankings from AP poll

The 1951 Texas Longhorns football team was an American football team that represented the University of Texas as a member of the Southwest Conference (SWC) during the 1951 college football season. In their first year under head coach Ed Price, the team compiled an overall record of 7–3, with a mark of 3–3 in conference play, placing third in the SWC. The November 10 win by the Baylor Bears would be their last victory in Austin until November 25, 1989.

== Schedule ==
Date	Opponent	Rank	Site	Result	Attendance	Source
September 22	No. 6 Kentucky*	No. 11	Memorial Stadium; Austin, TX	W 7–6	47,000	
September 29	at Purdue*	No. 11	Ross–Ade Stadium; West Lafayette, IN	W 14–0	31,000	
October 6	North Carolina*	No. 6	Memorial Stadium; Austin, TX	W 45–20	32,000	
October 13	vs. Oklahoma*	No. 6	Cotton Bowl; Dallas, TX (Red River Shootout)	W 9–7	75,347	
October 20	at Arkansas	No. 4	Razorback Stadium; Fayetteville, AR (rivalry)	L 14–16	18,000	
October 27	Rice	No. 10	Memorial Stadium; Austin, TX (rivalry)	W 14–6	50,000	
November 3	at SMU	No. 12	Cotton Bowl; Dallas, TX	W 20–13	72,000	
November 10	No. 16 Baylor	No. 10	Memorial Stadium; Austin, TX (rivalry)	L 6–18	58,000	
November 17	No. 13 TCU	No. 15	Memorial Stadium; Austin, TX (rivalry)	W 32–21	55,000	
November 29	at Texas A&M	No. 16	Kyle Field; College Station, TX (rivalry)	L 21–22	40,500	
*Non-conference game; Rankings from AP Poll released prior to the game
