= 1951 Washington State Cougars football team =

American college football season

1951 Washington State Cougars football
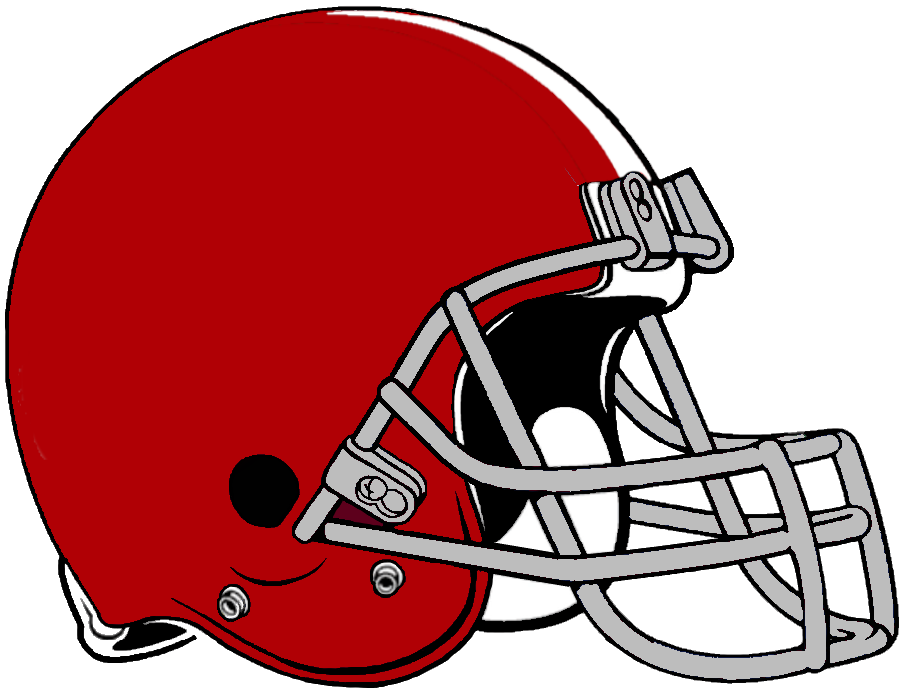
- Conference: Pacific Coast Conference

Ranking
- Coaches: No. 14
- AP: No. 18
- Record: 7–3 (4–3 PCC)
- Head coach: Forest Evashevski (2nd season)
- Captain: LaVern Torgeson
- Home stadium: Rogers Field, Memorial Stadium

1951 Pacific Coast Conference football standings
	Conf.					Overall
Team	W		L		T	W		L		T
No. 7 Stanford $	6	–	1	–	0	9	–	2	–	0
No. 17 UCLA	4	–	1	–	1	5	–	3	–	1
No. 12 California	5	–	2	–	0	8	–	2	–	0
USC	4	–	2	–	0	7	–	3	–	0
No. 18 Washington State	4	–	3	–	0	7	–	3	–	0
Oregon State	3	–	5	–	0	4	–	6	–	0
Washington	1	–	5	–	1	3	–	6	–	1
Oregon	1	–	6	–	0	2	–	8	–	0
Idaho	0	–	3	–	0	2	–	7	–	0
$ – Conference champion; Rankings from AP Poll

The 1951 Washington State Cougars football team was an American football team that represented Washington State College during the 1951 college football season. Second-year head coach Forest Evashevski led the team to a 4–3 mark in the Pacific Coast Conference (PCC) and 7–3 overall.

Three home games were played on campus in Pullman at Rogers Field, and two in Spokane, both at night. The Cougars defeated rival Washington by two points for their first win in Seattle in 21 years, and were in the top twenty in both final polls.

One of the stars of the 1951 Cougar team was Junior end Ed Barker, a future NFL first round draft pick.

After the season, Evashevski left for Iowa in early January, and backs coach Al Kircher was promoted the following week.

== Schedule ==
Date	Opponent	Rank	Site	Result	Attendance	Source
September 22	at USC		Los Angeles Memorial Coliseum; Los Angeles, CA	L 21–31	28,876	
September 29	Santa Clara*		Memorial Stadium; Spokane, WA	W 34–20	16,000	
October 5	Oklahoma A&M*		Memorial Stadium; Spokane, WA	W 27–13	18,000	
October 13	No. 2 California		Rogers Field; Pullman, WA	L 35–42	22,000	
October 20	at Oregon State		Bell Field; Corvallis, OR	W 26–13	15,500	
October 27	Oregon^{†}	No. 18	Rogers Field; Pullman, WA	W 41–6	12,000	
November 3	at No. 11 Stanford	No. 16	Stanford Stadium; Stanford, CA	L 13–21	49,000	
November 10	at Idaho	No. 17	Neale Stadium; Moscow, ID (Battle of the Palouse)	W 9–6	14,000	
November 17	Montana*	No. 17	Rogers Field; Pullman, WA	W 47–10	4,000	
November 24	at Washington	No. 17	Husky Stadium; Seattle, WA (rivalry)	W 27–25	52,000	
*Non-conference game; ^{†}Homecoming; Rankings from AP Poll released prior to the game; Source:
