= 1951 USC Trojans football team =

American college football season

1951 USC Trojans football
- Conference: Pacific Coast Conference
- Record: 7–3 (4–2 PCC)
- Head coach: Jess Hill (1st season)
- Home stadium: Los Angeles Memorial Coliseum

1951 Pacific Coast Conference football standings
	Conf.					Overall
Team	W		L		T	W		L		T
No. 7 Stanford $	6	–	1	–	0	9	–	2	–	0
No. 17 UCLA	4	–	1	–	1	5	–	3	–	1
No. 12 California	5	–	2	–	0	8	–	2	–	0
USC	4	–	2	–	0	7	–	3	–	0
No. 18 Washington State	4	–	3	–	0	7	–	3	–	0
Oregon State	3	–	5	–	0	4	–	6	–	0
Washington	1	–	5	–	1	3	–	6	–	1
Oregon	1	–	6	–	0	2	–	8	–	0
Idaho	0	–	3	–	0	2	–	7	–	0
$ – Conference champion; Rankings from AP Poll

The 1951 USC Trojans football team represented the University of Southern California (USC) as a member of the Pacific Coast Conference (PCC_) during the 1951 college football season. Led by first year head coach Jess Hill, the Trojans compiled an overall record of 7–3 with a mark of 4–2 in conference play, placing fourth in the PCC. USC played home games at Los Angeles Memorial Coliseum in Los Angeles.

== Schedule ==
Date	Opponent	Rank	Site	Result	Attendance	Source
September 22	Washington State		Los Angeles Memorial Coliseum; Los Angeles, CA	W 31–21	28,876	
September 29	San Diego NTC*		Los Angeles Memorial Coliseum; Los Angeles, CA	W 41–7	26,574	
October 6	at No. 12 Washington		Husky Stadium; Seattle, WA	W 20–13	47,000	
October 13	No. 18 Oregon State	No. 14	Los Angeles Memorial Coliseum; Los Angeles, CA	W 16–14	36,400	
October 20	at No. 1 California	No. 11	California Memorial Stadium; Berkeley, CA	W 21–14	81,490	
October 27	TCU*	No. 6	Los Angeles Memorial Coliseum; Los Angeles, CA	W 28–26	50,732	
November 3	Army*	No. 7	Yankee Stadium; Bronx, NY	W 28–6	16,508	
November 10	No. 7 Stanford	No. 6	Los Angeles Memorial Coliseum; Los Angeles, CA (rivalry)	L 20–27	96,130	
November 24	UCLA	No. 11	Los Angeles Memorial Coliseum; Los Angeles, CA (Victory Bell)	L 7–21	71,738	
December 1	Notre Dame*	No. 20	Los Angeles Memorial Coliseum; Los Angeles, CA (rivalry)	L 12–19	55,783	
*Non-conference game; Rankings from AP Poll released prior to the game; Source:

== Coaching staff ==
- Head coach: Jess Hill
- Assistant coaches: Walter Hargesheimer (backfield coach), Mel Hein (line coach), Joe Muha (backfield coach), Bill Fisk (end coach), Don Clark (line coach), Jess Mortensen (junior varsity coach), Hilton A. Green (senior manager)

== Roster ==
- HB #16 Frank Gifford, Sr.

== 1952 NFL draft ==
The following players were drafted into professional football following the season.

Player	Position	Round	Pick	Franchise
Frank Gifford	Running back	1	11	New York Giants
Pat Cannamela		11	122	Dallas Texans
Bob Hooks	End	16	193	Los Angeles Rams
Al Baldock	End	17	201	San Francisco 49ers
Dean Schneider	Back	22	254	New York Giants
