= 1951 Oregon Ducks football team =

American college football season

1951 Oregon Ducks football
- Conference: Pacific Coast Conference
- Record: 2–8 (1–6 PCC)
- Head coach: Len Casanova (1st season)
- Captains: Michael Sikora; Richard Patrick
- Home stadium: Hayward Field, Multnomah Stadium

1951 Pacific Coast Conference football standings
	Conf.					Overall
Team	W		L		T	W		L		T
No. 7 Stanford $	6	–	1	–	0	9	–	2	–	0
No. 17 UCLA	4	–	1	–	1	5	–	3	–	1
No. 12 California	5	–	2	–	0	8	–	2	–	0
USC	4	–	2	–	0	7	–	3	–	0
No. 18 Washington State	4	–	3	–	0	7	–	3	–	0
Oregon State	3	–	5	–	0	4	–	6	–	0
Washington	1	–	5	–	1	3	–	6	–	1
Oregon	1	–	6	–	0	2	–	8	–	0
Idaho	0	–	3	–	0	2	–	7	–	0
$ – Conference champion; Rankings from AP Poll

The 1951 Oregon Ducks football team represented the University of Oregon as a member of the Pacific Coast Conference (PCC) during the 1951 college football season. In their first season under head coach Len Casanova, the Ducks compiled a 2–8 record (1–6 against PCC opponents), finished in eighth place in the PCC, and were outscored by their opponents, 317 to 130. The team played its home games at Hayward Field in Eugene, Oregon.

Oregon was ranked at No. 99 in the 1951 Litkenhous Ratings.

== Schedule ==
Date	Time	Opponent	Site	Result	Attendance	Source
September 22		Stanford	Multnomah Stadium; Portland, OR	L 20–27	23,894	
September 29		Arizona*	Hayward Field; Eugene, OR	W 39–21		
October 6		at Pacific (CA)*	Pacific Memorial Stadium; Stockton, CA	L 6–34	17,449	
October 13		Washington	Multnomah Stadium; Portland, OR (rivalry)	L 6–63	30,414	
October 20		at UCLA	Los Angeles Memorial Coliseum; Los Angeles, CA	L 0–41	14,495	
October 27		at No. 18 Washington State	Rogers Field; Pullman, WA	L 6–41	12,000	
November 3	1:30 pm	Idaho	Hayward Field; Eugene, OR	W 14–13	8,100	
November 10		at Boston University*	Fenway Park; Boston, MA	L 6–35		
November 17		at No. 16 California	California Memorial Stadium; Berkeley, CA	L 26–28	23,000	
November 24		Oregon State^{†}	Hayward Field; Eugene, OR (Civil War)	L 7–14	19,007	
*Non-conference game; ^{†}Homecoming; Rankings from AP Poll released prior to the game; Source:
