= 1951 TCU Horned Frogs football team =

American college football season

1951 TCU Horned Frogs football

SWC champion

Cotton Bowl Classic, L 7–20 vs. Kentucky
- Conference: Southwest Conference

Ranking
- Coaches: No. 10
- AP: No. 11
- Record: 6–5 (5–1 SWC)
- Head coach: Dutch Meyer (18th season)
- Offensive scheme: Meyer spread
- Home stadium: Amon G. Carter Stadium

1951 Southwest Conference football standings
	Conf.					Overall
Team	W		L		T	W		L		T
No. 11 TCU $	5	–	1	–	0	6	–	5	–	0
No. 9 Baylor	4	–	1	–	1	8	–	2	–	1
Texas	3	–	3	–	0	7	–	3	–	0
Rice	3	–	3	–	0	5	–	5	–	0
Texas A&M	1	–	3	–	2	5	–	3	–	2
Arkansas	2	–	4	–	0	5	–	5	–	0
SMU	1	–	4	–	1	3	–	6	–	1
$ – Conference champion; Rankings from AP poll

The 1951 TCU Horned Frogs football team represented Texas Christian University (TCU) in the 1951 college football season. The Horned Frogs finished the season 6–5 overall and 5–1 in the Southwest Conference to win the conference title. The team was coached by Dutch Meyer in his eighteenth year as head coach. The Frogs played their home games in Amon G. Carter Stadium, which is located on campus in Fort Worth, Texas. They were invited to the Cotton Bowl Classic where they lost to Kentucky by a score of 20–7.

== Schedule ==
Date	Opponent	Rank	Site	Result	Attendance	Source
September 22	Kansas*		Amon G. Carter Stadium; Fort Worth, TX	L 13–27	28,000	
September 29	at No. 12 Nebraska*		Memorial Stadium; Lincoln, NE	W 28–7	38,000	
October 6	at Arkansas		Memorial Stadium; Little Rock, AR	W 17–7	29,500	
October 13	at Texas Tech*		Jones Stadium; Lubbock, TX (rivalry)	L 19–33	19,000	
October 20	No. 6 Texas A&M		Amon G. Carter Stadium; Fort Worth, TX (rivalry)	W 20–14	34,000	
October 27	at No. 6 USC*		Los Angeles Memorial Coliseum; Los Angeles, CA	L 26–28	50,732	
November 3	at No. 8 Baylor		Baylor Stadium; Waco, TX (rivalry)	W 20–7	37,000	
November 17	at No. 15 Texas	No. 13	War Memorial Stadium; Austin, TX (rivalry)	L 21–32	55,000	
November 24	No. 18 Rice		Amon G. Carter Stadium; Fort Worth, TX	W 22–6	25,000	
December 1	SMU	No. 11	Amon G. Carter Stadium; Fort Worth, TX (rivalry)	W 13–2	35,000	
January 1, 1952	vs. No. 17 Kentucky*	No. 11	Cotton Bowl; Dallas, TX (Cotton Bowl)	L 7–20	75,349	
*Non-conference game; Rankings from AP Poll released prior to the game
