= 1951 Arkansas Razorbacks football team =

American college football season

1951 Arkansas Razorbacks football
- Conference: Southwest Conference
- Record: 5–5 (1–5 SWC)
- Head coach: Otis Douglas (2nd season)
- Captains: Dave Hanner; Pat Summerall
- Home stadium: Razorback Stadium; War Memorial Stadium

1951 Southwest Conference football standings
	Conf.					Overall
Team	W		L		T	W		L		T
No. 11 TCU $	5	–	1	–	0	6	–	5	–	0
No. 9 Baylor	4	–	1	–	1	8	–	2	–	1
Texas	3	–	3	–	0	7	–	3	–	0
Rice	3	–	3	–	0	5	–	5	–	0
Texas A&M	1	–	3	–	2	5	–	3	–	2
Arkansas	2	–	4	–	0	5	–	5	–	0
SMU	1	–	4	–	1	3	–	6	–	1
$ – Conference champion; Rankings from AP poll

The 1951 Arkansas Razorbacks football team represented the University of Arkansas in the Southwest Conference (SWC) during the 1951 college football season. In their second year under head coach Otis Douglas, the Razorbacks compiled a 5–5 record (1–5 against SWC opponents), finished in sixth place in the SWC, and outscored their opponents by a combined total of 178 to 162. Dave Hanner and Pat Summerall were the team's co-captains.

== Schedule ==
Date	Opponent	Rank	Site	Result	Attendance	Source
September 22	at Oklahoma A&M*		Lewis Field; Stillwater, OK	W 42–7	25,000	
September 29	Arizona State*		Razorback Stadium; Fayetteville, AR	W 30–13	10,000	
October 6	TCU		War Memorial Stadium; Little Rock, AR	L 7–17	29,500	
October 13	at No. 12 Baylor		Baylor Stadium; Waco, TX	L 7–9	25,000	
October 20	No. 4 Texas		Razorback Stadium; Fayetteville, AR (rivalry)	W 16–14	18,000	
October 27	Santa Clara*	No. 19	War Memorial Stadium; Little Rock, AR	L 12–21	14,500	
November 3	No. 18 Texas A&M		Razorback Stadium; Fayetteville, AR (rivalry)	W 33–21	20,500	
November 10	at Rice	No. 20	Rice Stadium; Houston, TX	L 0–6		
November 17	at SMU		Cotton Bowl; Dallas, TX	L 7–47	33,500	
November 24	Tulsa*		War Memorial Stadium; Little Rock, AR	W 24–7	11,500	
*Non-conference game; Rankings from AP Poll released prior to the game
