= 1951 Washington Huskies football team =

American college football season

1951 Washington Huskies football
- Conference: Pacific Coast Conference
- Record: 3–6–1 (1–5–1 PCC)
- Head coach: Howie Odell (4th season)
- Captain: Ted Holzknecht
- Home stadium: University of Washington Stadium

1951 Pacific Coast Conference football standings
	Conf.					Overall
Team	W		L		T	W		L		T
No. 7 Stanford $	6	–	1	–	0	9	–	2	–	0
No. 17 UCLA	4	–	1	–	1	5	–	3	–	1
No. 12 California	5	–	2	–	0	8	–	2	–	0
USC	4	–	2	–	0	7	–	3	–	0
No. 18 Washington State	4	–	3	–	0	7	–	3	–	0
Oregon State	3	–	5	–	0	4	–	6	–	0
Washington	1	–	5	–	1	3	–	6	–	1
Oregon	1	–	6	–	0	2	–	8	–	0
Idaho	0	–	3	–	0	2	–	7	–	0
$ – Conference champion; Rankings from AP Poll

The 1951 Washington Huskies football team was an American football team that represented the University of Washington during the 1951 college football season. In its fourth season under head coach Howie Odell, the team compiled a 3–6–1 record, finished in seventh place in the Pacific Coast Conference, and outscored its opponents by a combined total of 273 to 218.

Ted Holzknecht was the team captain. The team featured fullback Hugh McElhenny, who would go on to become a member of the Pro Football Hall of Fame.

== Schedule ==
Date	Opponent	Rank	Site	Result	Attendance	Source
September 22	Montana*	No. 8	University of Washington Stadium; Seattle, WA	W 58–7	33,000–36,987	
September 29	at Minnesota*	No. 8	Memorial Stadium; Minneapolis, MN	W 25–20	50,634	
October 6	USC	No. 12	University of Washington Stadium; Seattle, WA	L 13–20	47,000	
October 13	at Oregon		Providence Park; Portland, OR (rivalry)	W 63–6	30,414	
October 20	No. 8 Illinois*	No. 20	University of Washington Stadium; Seattle, WA	L 20–27	54,000	
October 27	No. 11 Stanford		University of Washington Stadium; Seattle, WA	L 7–14	43,500	
November 3	Oregon State		University of Washington Stadium; Seattle, WA	L 14–40	33,500	
November 10	at California		California Memorial Stadium; Berkeley, CA	L 28–37	46,000	
November 17	at No. 18 UCLA		Los Angeles Memorial Coliseum; Los Angeles, CA	T 20–20	31,597	
November 24	No. 17 Washington State		University of Washington Stadium; Seattle, WA (rivalry)	L 25–27	52,000	
*Non-conference game; Rankings from AP Poll released prior to the game; Source:

== Game summaries ==
=== USC ===
USC at Washington

Team	1	2	3	4	Total
• Trojans	7	6	0	7	20
No. 12 Huskies	7	0	0	6	13

- Date: October 6
- Location: University of Washington Stadium, Seattle
- Game attendance: 43,747

Cover of the program for the November 3 game against Oregon State College.

The highlight of the 1951 contest came in the fourth quarter when Hugh McElhenny returned a punt from Des Koch for 100 yards, running past Frank Gifford on his way to the end zone.

== NFL draft selections ==
Two University of Washington Huskies were selected in the 1952 NFL draft, which lasted 30 rounds with 360 selections.

= Husky Hall of Fame

Player	Position	Round	Pick	NFL club
Hugh McElhenny	Running back	1st	9	San Francisco 49ers
Don Heinrich	Quarterback	3rd	35	New York Giants

Heinrich did not play in 1951 due to a shoulder injury, then led the Huskies in 1952.
Due to military service, his first season with the Giants was in 1954.
