= Bobby Jack Floyd =

American football player (1929–2012)

No. 33, 35
- Position: Fullback

Personal information
- Born: December 8, 1929; Paris, Texas, U.S.
- Died: June 27, 2012 (aged 82); Paris, Texas, U.S.
- Listed height: 6 ft 0 in (1.83 m)
- Listed weight: 210 lb (95 kg)

Career information
- High school: Paris
- College: TCU (1948–1951)
- NFL draft: 1952: 15th round, 172nd overall pick

Career history
- Green Bay Packers (1952); Chicago Bears (1953)

Awards and highlights
- Second-team All-SWC (1951)

Career NFL statistics
- Rushing yards: 306
- Rushing average: 4
- Receptions: 20
- Receiving yards: 192
- Total touchdowns: 1
- Stats at Pro Football Reference

Bobby Jack Floyd (December 8, 1929 – June 27, 2012) was a fullback in the National Football League (NFL) for the Green Bay Packers and Chicago Bears. Floyd was born on December 8, 1929, in Paris, Texas, where he attended Paris High School. After high school, he attended Paris Junior College and then Texas Christian University (TCU) where he played college football. At TCU, Floyd was named to the All-Conference team and played in the 1952 Cotton Bowl Classic.

Floyd was drafted 172nd overall by the Packers in the fifteenth round of the 1952 NFL draft. He played that season for the Packers, where he was the team's third leading rusher. After being released by the Packers, he was signed by the Bears. He played eight games for the Bears that season. Over his two-season career, Floyd played in 20 games, rushing 77 times for 306 yards and a touchdown. He also caught 20 passes for 192 yards and had 5 kick returns for 75 yards.
