= 1952 Cotton Bowl Classic =

- 16th Cotton Bowl Classic
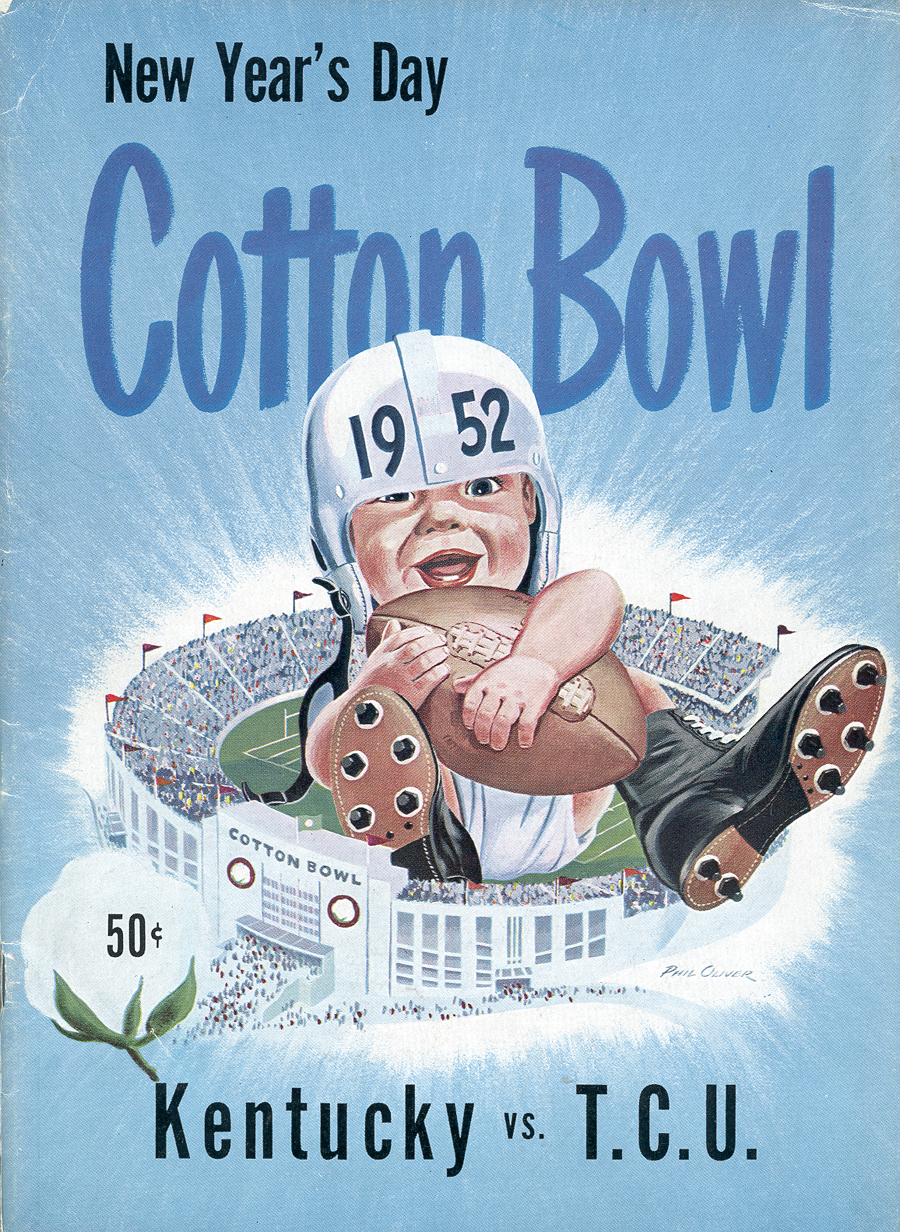
Kentucky Wildcats	TCU Horned Frogs
(7–4)	(6–4)
SEC	SWC
20	7
Head coach: Bear Bryant	Head coach: Dutch Meyer
AP / Coaches; 15 / 17	AP / Coaches; 11 / 10
	1	2	3	4	Total
Kentucky	7	6	0	7	20
TCU	0	0	7	0	7
- Date: January 1, 1952
- Season: 1951
- Stadium: Cotton Bowl
- Location: Dallas, Texas
- MVP: HB Emery Clark (Kentucky); G Ray Correll (Kentucky); QB Babe Parilli (Kentucky); FB Keith Flowers (TCU)
- Referee: Cliff Shaw (SWC; split crew: SWC, SEC)
- Attendance: 75,349

The Cotton Bowl in Dallas, Texas, hosted the Cotton Bowl Classic.

The 1952 Cotton Bowl Classic was the sixteenth installment of the Cotton Bowl Classic.

== Background ==
The game featured the Kentucky Wildcats of the Southeastern Conference and the Texas Christian Horned Frogs of the Southwest Conference. Texas Christian (6-4 entering the game, 5-1 in the SWC) was ranked #11 in the AP poll prior to the game. Kentucky (7-4, 3-3 SEC) had been ranked as high as #6 in the AP poll during the season but was ranked #15 entering the game.

== Game summary ==
In the first quarter, Kentucky quarterback Babe Parilli threw a five-yard touchdown pass to Emery Clark; Harry Jones' point after gave the Wildcats a 7-0 lead. In the second quarter, a 57-yard Kentucky drive ended when Parilli completed a 13-yard touchdown pass to Clark. The point after was no good, resulting in a halftime score of Kentucky 13, Texas Christian 0, despite Texas Christian drives that got all the way to the Kentucky 4-, 24-, 5- and 2-yard lines during the half.

Texas Christian scored first in the second half after a four-play, 80-yard drive as Bobby Jack Floyd ran for a 43-yard touchdown on a sweep. Keith Flowers' point after made it Kentucky 13, Texas Christian 7 with 1:12 left in the third quarter.

Kentucky's Ed Hamilton scored on a 3-yard run and the Jones' point with 3:33 left in the fourth quarter resulted in the final score of Kentucky 20, Texas Christian 7.

Kentucky's Emery Clark, Babe Parilli and Ray Correll were named the MVPs of the game. Kentucky's Tom Fillon had a game high 73 rushing yards (on 10 attempts); Kentucky's Steve Meilinger had 61 receiving yards on 3 catches.
