= Glen Christian =

American gridiron football player

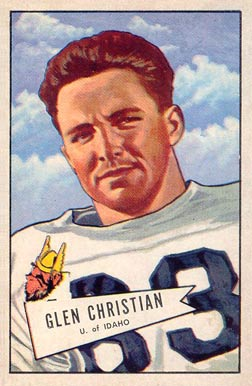
- Christian on a 1952 Bowman football card

No. 37, 87, 84, 93
- Position: Halfback

Personal information
- Born: 1929 (age 96–97); Calgary, Alberta, Canada
- Listed height: 5 ft 10 in (1.78 m)
- Listed weight: 190 lb (86 kg)

Career information
- College: Idaho
- NFL draft: 1952: 9th round, 105th overall pick

Career history
- 1952: San Francisco 49ers*
- 1953–1955: Calgary Stampeders
- 1955–1956: BC Lions
- 1957: Calgary Stampeders
- * Offseason or practice squad member only

Glen Christian (born 1929) is a Canadian former professional football halfback who played five seasons in the Western Interprovincial Football Union (WIFU) with the Calgary Stampeders and BC Lions. He was selected by the San Francisco 49ers in the ninth round of the 1952 NFL draft. He played college football at the University of Idaho.

== Early life and college ==
Christian (left) with Idaho in 1951

Christian was born in 1929 in Calgary, Alberta, Canada. He was a member of the Idaho Vandals freshman team in 1947. He joined the main roster in 1948 and was a three-year letterman from 1949 to 1951.

== Professional career ==
Christian was selected by the San Francisco 49ers in the ninth round, with the 105th overall pick, of the 1952 NFL draft. He officially signed with the team on April 29, 1952. However, he was later released.

Christian had his requests for employment rejected by the Edmonton Eskimos and Calgary Stampeders of the WIFU. However, when he later mentioned that he was born in Canada, which qualified him as a non-import player, the Stampeders signed him to a contract. He played offense, defense, and served as a kicker during his professional career. He played in 16 games for the Stampeders in 1953, rushing for 104 yards, catching five passes for 140 yards, returning 14 punts for 145 yards, returning 12 kickoffs for 257 yards, and kicking off seven times for 332 yards. Christian also scored one field goal, one rogue, and 14 extra points during the 1953 season. He played in 11 games in 1954, totaling two interceptions for 62 yards and one touchdown, 39 punt returns for 415 yards and one touchdown, one punt for 32 yards, and three fumble recoveries. Christian played in five games for the Stampeders in 1955 and recovered two fumbles.

Christian also played for the BC Lions in 1955, and made one interception. He played 12 games during the 1956 season, rushing ten times for 86 yards and one touchdown, making one interception, and returning 29 punts for 143 yards.

Christian returned to the Stampeders for his final season in 1957 and played in 13 games, accumulating 28 punt returns for 179 yards and 13 kickoff returns for 255 yards.
