= 1952 Orange Bowl =

American college football game

- 18th Orange Bowl
- Burdine Stadium in Miami, Florida, hosted the Orange Bowl.
Baylor Bears	Georgia Tech Yellow Jackets
(8–1–1)	(10–0–1)
SWC	SEC
14	17
Head coach: George Sauer	Head coach: Bobby Dodd
AP / Coaches; 9 / 9	AP / Coaches; 5 / 5
	1	2	3	4	Total
Baylor	7	7	0	0	14
Georgia Tech	7	0	0	10	17
- Date: January 1, 1952
- Season: 1951
- Stadium: Burdine Stadium
- Location: Miami, Florida
- Referee: F.C. Baccus (SWC; split crew: SWC, SEC)
- Attendance: 65,839

The 1952 Orange Bowl was a college football postseason bowl game between the Georgia Tech Yellow Jackets and the Baylor Bears.

== Background ==
Georgia Tech was co-champion of the Southeastern Conference with #1 Tennessee. Baylor finished 2nd in the Southwest Conference. This was Georgia Tech's first Orange Bowl since 1948, and Baylor's first ever Orange Bowl. Originally, the #13 Virginia Cavaliers had been invited to play Georgia Tech in what would have been the Cavaliers' first-ever bowl game. However, University president Colgate Darden declined the offer due to his desire to steer clear of "big-time, highly subsidized football." Virginia would not have its first bowl appearance until 1984.

=== Controversy ===
During the 1951 season, the football team of the University of San Francisco, nicknamed the Dons, went undefeated (9–0) and were ranked 14th in the final AP Poll. Accounts from players on the team state that the Dons were denied an invitation to the Orange Bowl because they refused to play without their two African-American star players, Ollie Matson and Burl Toler.

Organizers of the Orange Bowl stated in 2016, "All our research shows it’s a false story, unsubstantiated. We invited two higher ranked teams." Contemporary newspaper reports at the time bowl selections were being made (late November 1951) cited the Dons' "weak schedule" as the reason why the Orange Bowl did not invite them.

== Game summary ==
Hardeman scored on a 3-yard run to give the Yellow Jackets a 7–0 lead. Parma tied the game on a 1-yard touchdown plunge for Baylor. Coody gave the team a 14–7 lead on his touchdown run. This lead held up for most of the second half. However, with 6:53 remaining in the game the Yellow Jackets tied the game on a 22-yard touchdown pass from Darrell Crawford to Buck Martin. Three minutes later, a Pete Ferris interception of a Larry Isbell pass gave Georgia Tech the ball at the 9. The team could only muster three yards before fourth down came up, with Dodd deciding to go for the field goal. Pepper Rodgers' 22-yard field goal broke the tie and ultimately was the winning points for the Yellow Jackets.

== Aftermath ==
Baylor has not reached the Orange Bowl since this game. Georgia Tech did not reach the Orange Bowl again until 1967.

== Statistics ==
Statistics	Georgia Tech	Baylor
First downs	9	17
Rushing yards	152	206
Passing yards	84	93
Total yards	236	299
Interceptions	1	3
Punts–average	7–35.3	6–34.7
Fumbles–lost	3–1	4–0
Penalties–yards	6–60	7–85
