= 1951 Stanford Indians football team =

American college football season

1951 Stanford Indians football

PCC champion

Rose Bowl, L 7–40 vs. Illinois
- Conference: Pacific Coast Conference

Ranking
- Coaches: No. 7
- AP: No. 7
- Record: 9–2 (6–1 PCC)
- Head coach: Chuck Taylor (1st season)
- Home stadium: Stanford Stadium

1951 Pacific Coast Conference football standings
	Conf.					Overall
Team	W		L		T	W		L		T
No. 7 Stanford $	6	–	1	–	0	9	–	2	–	0
No. 17 UCLA	4	–	1	–	1	5	–	3	–	1
No. 12 California	5	–	2	–	0	8	–	2	–	0
USC	4	–	2	–	0	7	–	3	–	0
No. 18 Washington State	4	–	3	–	0	7	–	3	–	0
Oregon State	3	–	5	–	0	4	–	6	–	0
Washington	1	–	5	–	1	3	–	6	–	1
Oregon	1	–	6	–	0	2	–	8	–	0
Idaho	0	–	3	–	0	2	–	7	–	0
$ – Conference champion; Rankings from AP Poll

The 1951 Stanford Indians football team represented Stanford University in the 1951 college football season. Stanford was led by first-year head coach Chuck Taylor. The team was a member of the Pacific Coast Conference and played their home games at Stanford Stadium in Stanford, California.

The 1950 season had ended in disappointing fashion after high expectations and a fast start. Head coach Marchmont Schwartz had resigned following the season, and to replace him, Stanford hired Chuck Taylor, a former Stanford All-American guard and member of Stanford's undefeated 1940 team which defeated Nebraska in the 1941 Rose Bowl.

Led by the passing attack of senior quarterback Gary Kerkorian and senior end Bill McColl, Stanford ran out to a 9–0 start and took a No. 3 ranking into the Big Game, where they were 13-point favorites over rival California. Cal upset the Indians 20–7, but as PCC champions, Stanford was invited to the 1952 Rose Bowl against Big Ten champion and 4th-ranked Illinois. The Indians led at halftime 7–6 and trailed only 13–7 to start the fourth quarter, but a 27-point scoring outburst gave the Fighting Illini a convincing 40–7 victory.

== Schedule ==
Date	Opponent	Rank	Site	Result	Attendance	Source
September 22	at Oregon		Multnomah Stadium; Portland, OR	W 27–20	23,894	
September 29	San Jose State*		Stanford Stadium; Stanford, CA (rivalry)	W 26–13	20,000	
October 6	at Michigan*		Michigan Stadium; Ann Arbor, MI	W 23–13	57,200	
October 13	UCLA	No. 19	Stanford Stadium; Stanford, CA	W 21–7	35,000	
October 20	Santa Clara*	No. 13	Stanford Stadium; Stanford, CA	W 21–14	20,000	
October 27	at Washington	No. 11	Husky Stadium; Seattle, WA	W 14–7	43,500	
November 3	No. 16 Washington State	No. 11	Stanford Stadium; Stanford, CA	W 21–13	49,000	
November 10	at No. 6 USC	No. 7	Los Angeles Memorial Coliseum; Los Angeles, CA (rivalry)	W 27–20	96,130	
November 17	Oregon State	No. 4	Stanford Stadium; Stanford, CA	W 35–14	45,000	
November 24	No. 19 California	No. 3	Stanford Stadium; Stanford, CA (Big Game)	L 7–20	90,000	
January 1, 1952	vs. No. 4 Illinois	No. 8	Rose Bowl; Pasadena, CA (Rose Bowl)	L 7–40	96,825	
*Non-conference game; Rankings from AP Poll released prior to the game; Source:

== Aftermath ==
Program for the November 17 home game with the Oregon State Beavers.

Taylor, at 31 the youngest major college football coach, was named AFCA Coach of the Year, the only time a Stanford coach has received the award. In addition to numerous awards, McColl was a Consensus All-American, finished fourth in the voting for the Heisman Trophy, and would go on to a seven-year professional career with the Chicago Bears. Kerkorian was drafted by the Pittsburgh Steelers and backed up Johnny Unitas with the Baltimore Colts.

== Players drafted by the NFL ==
Player	Position	Round	Pick	NFL club
Bill McColl	End	3	32	Chicago Bears
Bob Meyers	Halfback	16	190	San Francisco 49ers
Dick Horn	Quarterback	17	194	Dallas Texans
Gary Kerkorian	Quarterback	19	222	Pittsburgh Steelers
Harry Hugasian	Halfback	21	242	Dallas Texans
