= 1952 Rose Bowl =

American college football game

- 38th Rose Bowl Game
Stanford Indians	Illinois Fighting Illini
(9–1)	(8–0–1)
Pacific Coast	Big Ten
7	40
Head coach: Chuck Taylor	Head coach: Ray Eliot
AP / Coaches; 7 / 7	AP / Coaches; 4 / 3
	1	2	3	4	Total
Stanford	7	0	0	0	7
Illinois	6	0	7	27	40
- Date: January 1, 1952
- Season: 1951
- Stadium: Rose Bowl
- Location: Pasadena, California
- MVP: Bill Tate (Illinois RB)
- Favorite: Illinois by 7 points
- Referee: Rollie Barnum (Big Ten; split crew: Big Ten, Pacific Coast)
- Attendance: 96,825

United States TV coverage
- Network: NBC

The 1952 Rose Bowl was the 38th edition of the college football bowl game, played at the Rose Bowl in Pasadena, California. Held on Tuesday, January 1, at the end of the 1951 college football season, it was the first nationally televised college football game.

The fourth-ranked Illinois Fighting Illini of the Big Ten Conference defeated the #7 Stanford Indians of the Pacific Coast Conference, 40–7.

Since the two conferences agreed to match up in Pasadena, starting with the 1947 Rose Bowl, the Big Ten had won all six games.

== Game summary ==
Stanford led 7 to 6 on a Harry Hugasian touchdown until late in the third quarter. Illinois then scored 34 unanswered points, 27 in the fourth quarter. Illinois running back Bill Tate rushed for 150 yards and two touchdowns, and was named Player of the Game. All-American Johnny Karras rushed for 58 yards and a touchdown for Illinois, which had 434 yards of total offense.

It was the second Rose Bowl win for Illinois head coach Ray Eliot, the first was in 1947. Stanford head coach Chuck Taylor became the first to play and coach in the Rose Bowl, having played as one of Stanford's undefeated Wow Boys eleven years earlier, in 1941.
