= Los Angeles Pride =

One of the world's largest LGBTQ events

LA Pride
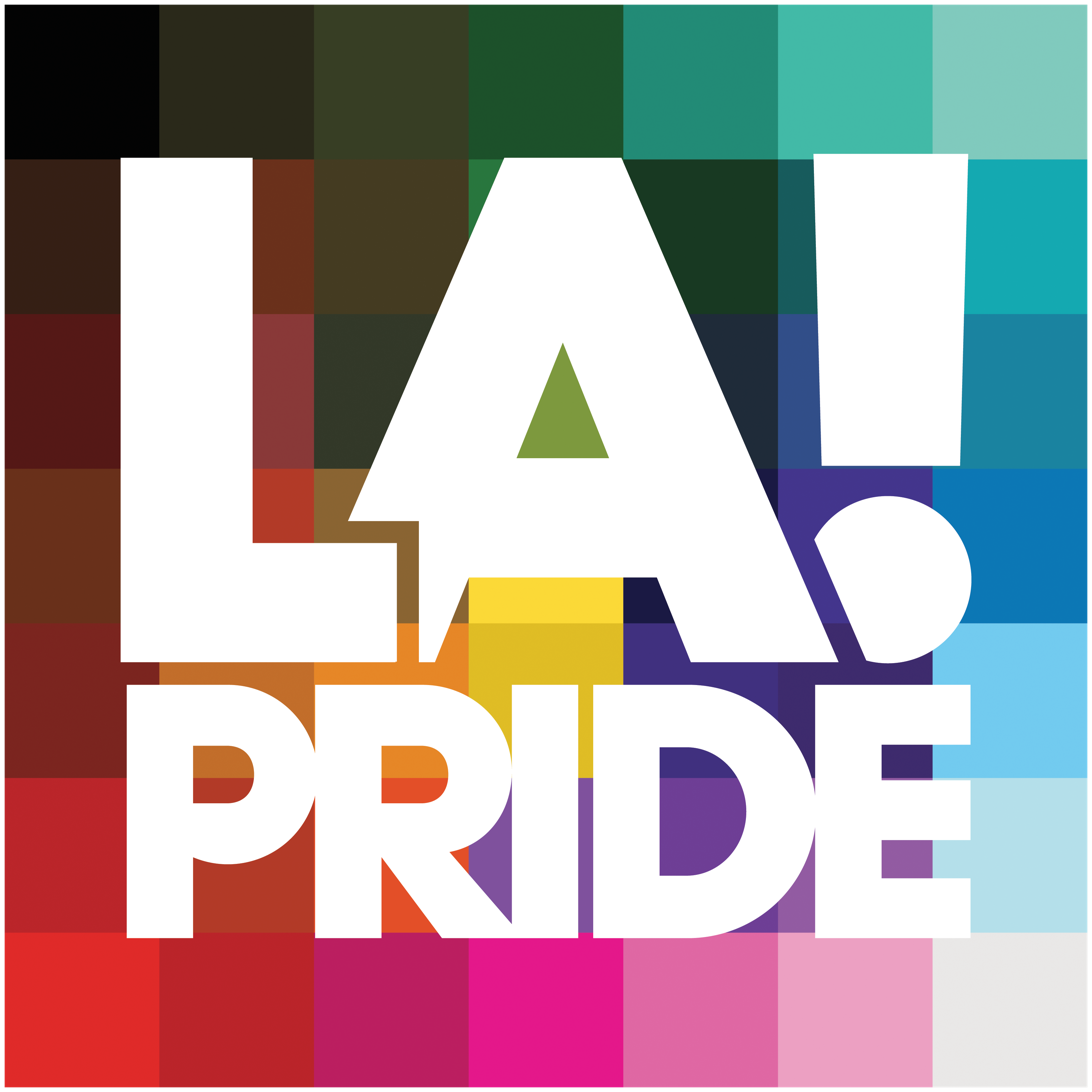

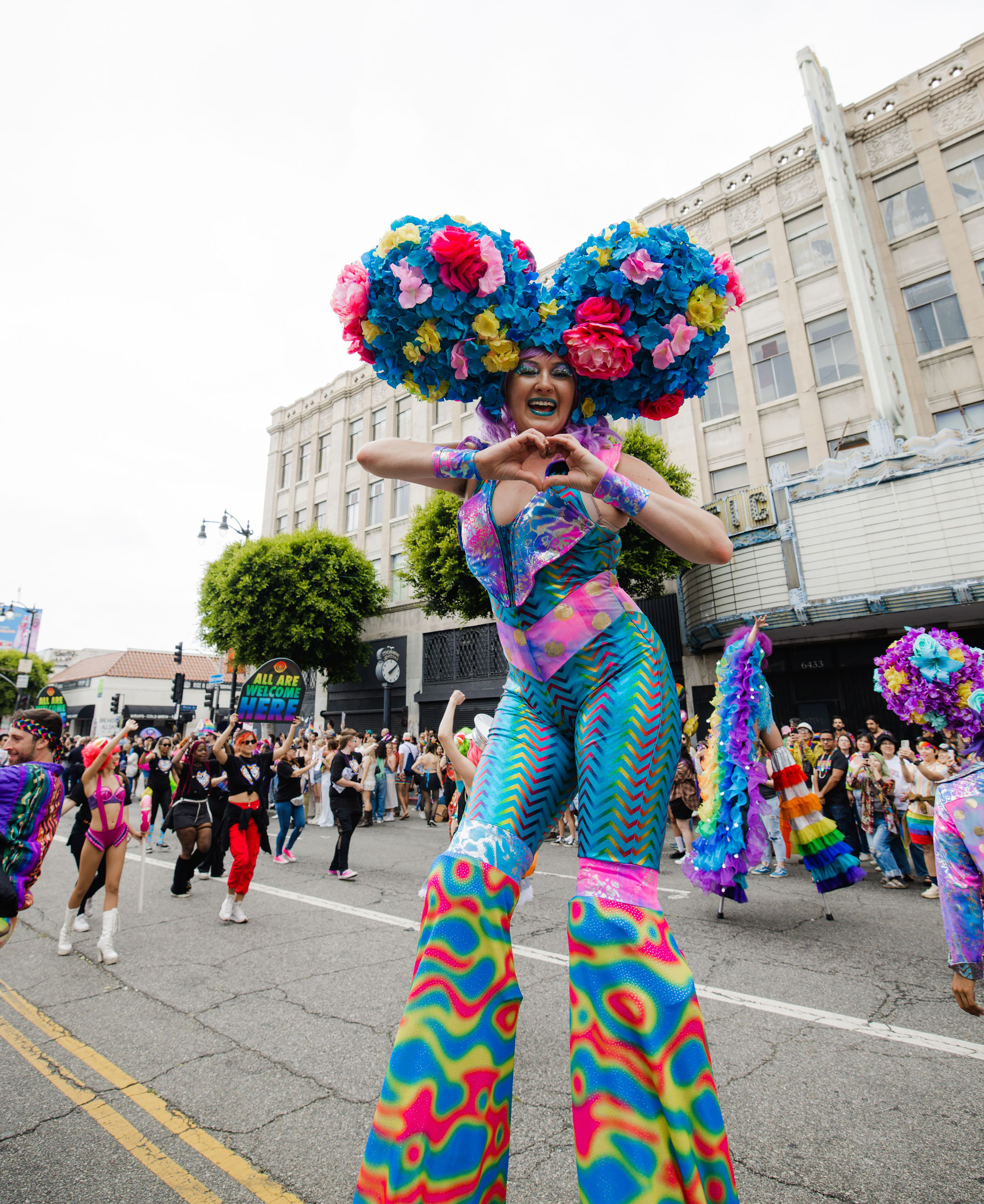
- Genre: Pride parade and festival
- Date: Second weekend of June
- Location: Los Angeles, California
- Inaugurated: 1970
- Attendance: 175,000
- Organizer: Christopher Street West Association
- Filing status: 501(c)3
- Website: www.lapride.org

The LA Pride Festival & Parade, commonly known as LA Pride, is an annual LGBTQ Pride celebration in Los Angeles, California. It is a large LGBTQ Pride event, traditionally held on the second weekend of June, and produced by the Christopher Street West Association.

== Christopher Street West Association Inc. ==
Christopher Street West Association (CSW) was established in 1970 by co-founders Rev. Troy Perry (founder, Metropolitan Community Church), Rev. Bob Humphries (founder, United States Mission), and Morris Kight (founder, Gay Liberation Front) to organize a gay parade in Los Angeles to commemorate the Stonewall Riots in Lower Manhattan, New York City, the year prior. Its eponymous name is an homage to The Stonewall Inn's address on Christopher Street in Greenwich Village.

CSW remained an ad hoc organization run by an all-volunteer board of directors until 1976, when it incorporated and was granted 501(c)3 nonprofit status by the Internal Revenue Service. CSW is still run by an all-volunteer board of directors.

CSW states its mission is to "create safe and inclusive spaces of self-expression, celebration, and diversity/equity/inclusion for the LGBTQ+ community of Greater Los Angeles."

While best known for producing the LA Pride Festival & Parade™, CSW also "organizes, sponsors or supports other community events throughout the year, and works with nonprofit, philanthropic, community and corporate partners to further diversity, equity and inclusion."

== LA Pride Festival and Parade ==
=== The first permitted gay parade in the world ===
CSW co-founders Rev. Troy Perry, Rev. Bob Humphries, and Morris Kight originally discussed organizing a march or a demonstration, but Troy Perry famously said, "No. We’re going to do a parade. This is Hollywood."

According to Rev. Perry, "The Police Commission voted 4 to 1 to place conditions on the parade permit. And they were, 1) you'd have to put up a bond for a million dollars to pay out the businesses when people throw rocks at ya'll 2) you have to put up a cash bond of $500,000, and 3) you've got to have at least 5000 people marching."

The ACLU joined CSW in their legal challenge of the LAPD's excessive fees, and restrictions that other parade permits were not required to follow . The California Superior Court ruled in favor of CSW and ordered the Police Commission to issue a parade permit to CSW for a $1,500 security payment, and furthermore, that all other requirements be dropped.

On June 28, 1970, approximately 2,000 people gathered on McCadden Place in Los Angeles, marched north to Hollywood Blvd, and proceeded east towards Vine Street. CSW's "Gay Pride Parade" became the first permitted gay parade in the world.

=== LA Pride evolution and relocation ===
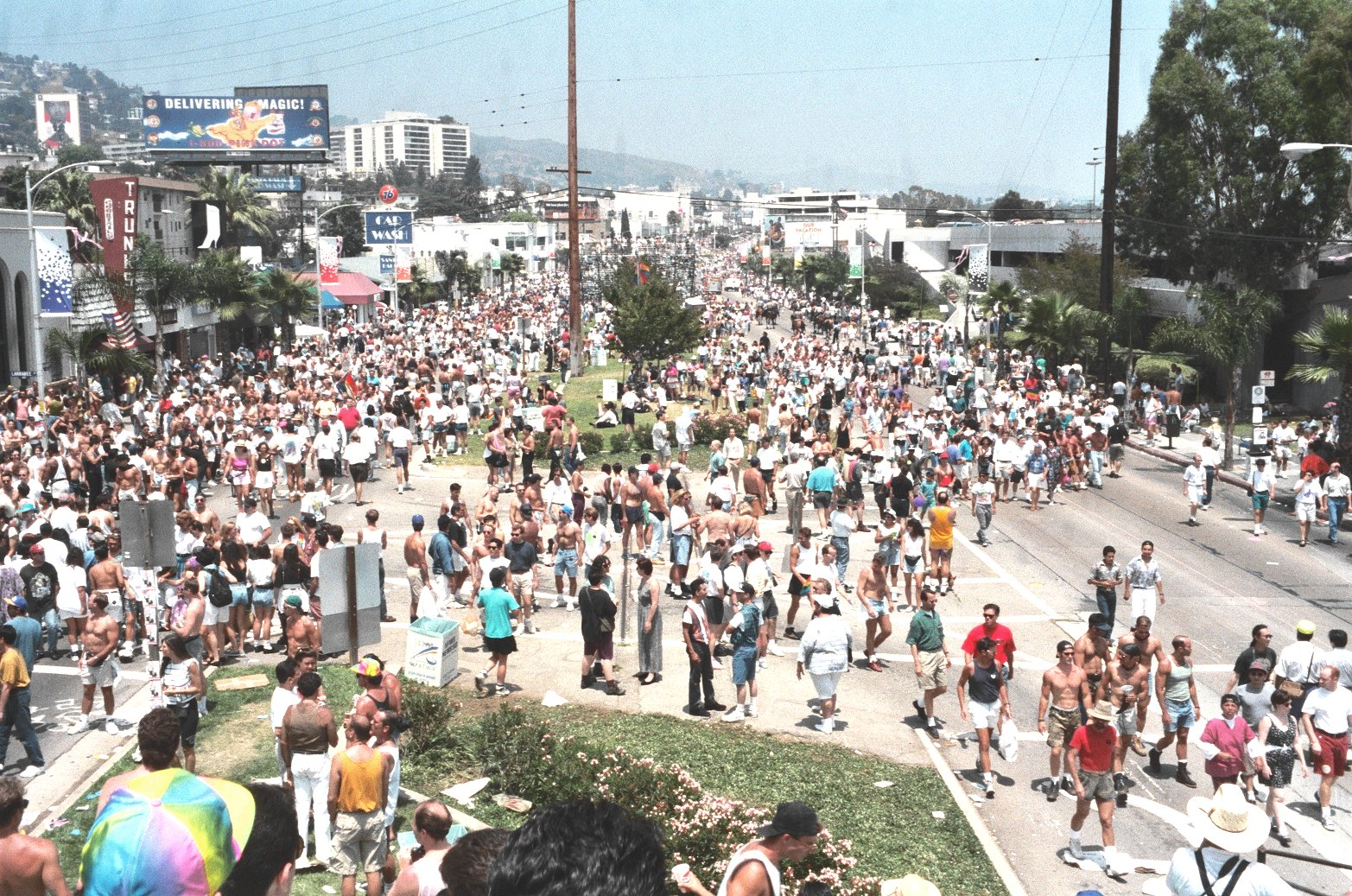
LA Pride 1993

In 1974, CSW board member and pioneering gay filmmaker, Pat Rocco, pitched the idea adding a festival to accompany the parade. The first festival was a carnival with rides, games, food, and vendor booths in a Hollywood parking lot. Continuing hostility and harassment from the Los Angeles Police Department led CSW to relocate the parade and festival in 1979 to a more welcoming unincorporated LA neighborhood around Santa Monica Blvd. In 1984, that area became part of the newly incorporated City of West Hollywood. Thus, LA Pride actually predates West Hollywood by five years.

Eventually, CSW trademarked the annual event as the LA Pride Festival & Parade™ and expanded the event to include a three-day celebration with music performances and other Pride events in and around Los Angeles during the entire month of June, Pride month. By the early 2000s, attendance of LA Pride weekend was estimated to be 400,000-500,000, making it one of the largest Pride celebrations in the United States, and the world. Recent LA Prides have included:

=== LA Pride 2015 ===
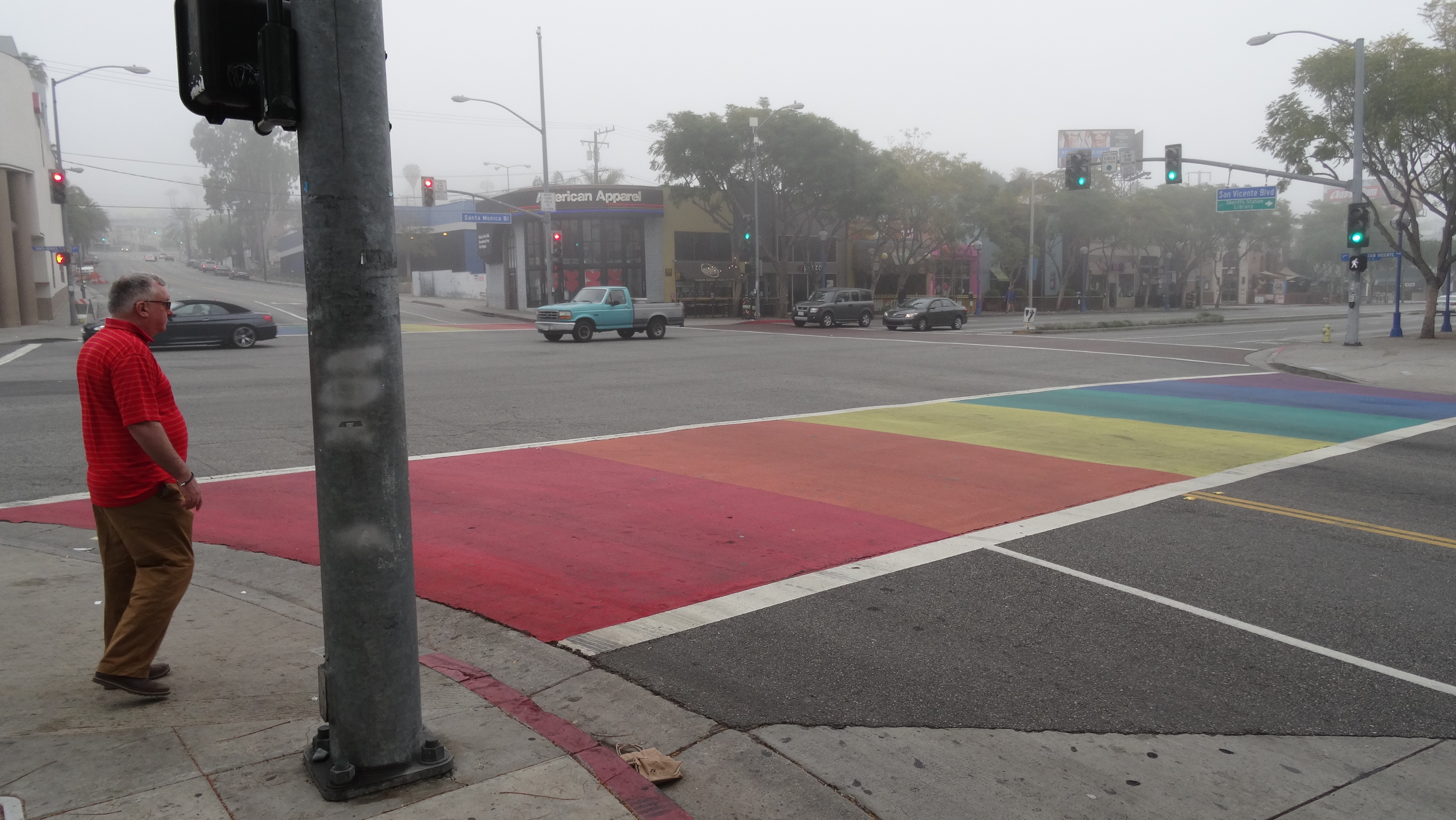
The first permanent rainbow crossing in the world was installed in time for the 2012 LA Pride Parade in West Hollywood, Los Angeles. The crossing sits alongside the Pride Parade route at the intersection of Santa Monica Boulevard and San Vicente Boulevard in West Hollywood. Photo taken in 2016.

In 2015 LA Pride was held on June 12 to June 14, 2015. The headlining artists for the festival were Wilson Phillips, Tinashe, Ty Herndon, Eden xo, and Fifth Harmony.

=== LA Pride 2016 ===
In 2016 LA Pride was held on June 10–12, 2016. Among the 35 artists scheduled to perform were Big Freedia, Charli XCX, Da Brat, Daya, Faith Evans, Carly Rae Jepsen, Lion Babe, Robin S., Hailee Steinfeld, and Trina. The Saturday night before the parade, Santa Monica police arrested a man who had explosives, assault rifles and ammunition, and was planning to attend the LA Pride festival parade, said Los Angeles Mayor Eric Garcetti during a press conference Sunday morning. The 22-year-old suspect was arrested hours after the massacre at Pulse nightclub in Orlando on June 12, 2016. It was unknown if the incidents were connected, the Los Angeles arrest was a copycat crime, or the two were unrelated.

=== LA Pride 2017 ===
In 2017 LA Pride replaced its traditional parade festivities with a resistance approach forming a #ResistMarch and incorporating the social media hashtag #OwnYourPride. The march kicked off at the original start of its 1970 parade in Hollywood on Hollywood Blvd. This attracted controversy in parts of the LGBT community as it was stated to be a Trump resistance march. Notable speakers at the #ResistMarch were: Maxine Waters, Margaret Cho, Chris Rock, America Ferrera, Adam Lambert, and Nancy Pelosi. The parade grand marshal was Alexei Romanoff, LGBT and AIDS activist, and one of the leaders of the Black Cat Tavern demonstrations in 1967, two years before the Stonewall Riot.

=== LA Pride 2018 ===
In 2018, LA Pride was held on June 9–10, 2018. The musical performances included appearance by R&B artist Kehlani and international pop singer Tove Lo. The first day of LA Pride's two-day annual Festival sold out for the first time ever in its 48-year history. The festival reached capacity by early evening. Due to the higher than expected turn out, some people who purchased tickets for Saturday were not able to enter the festival grounds.

=== LA Pride 2019 ===
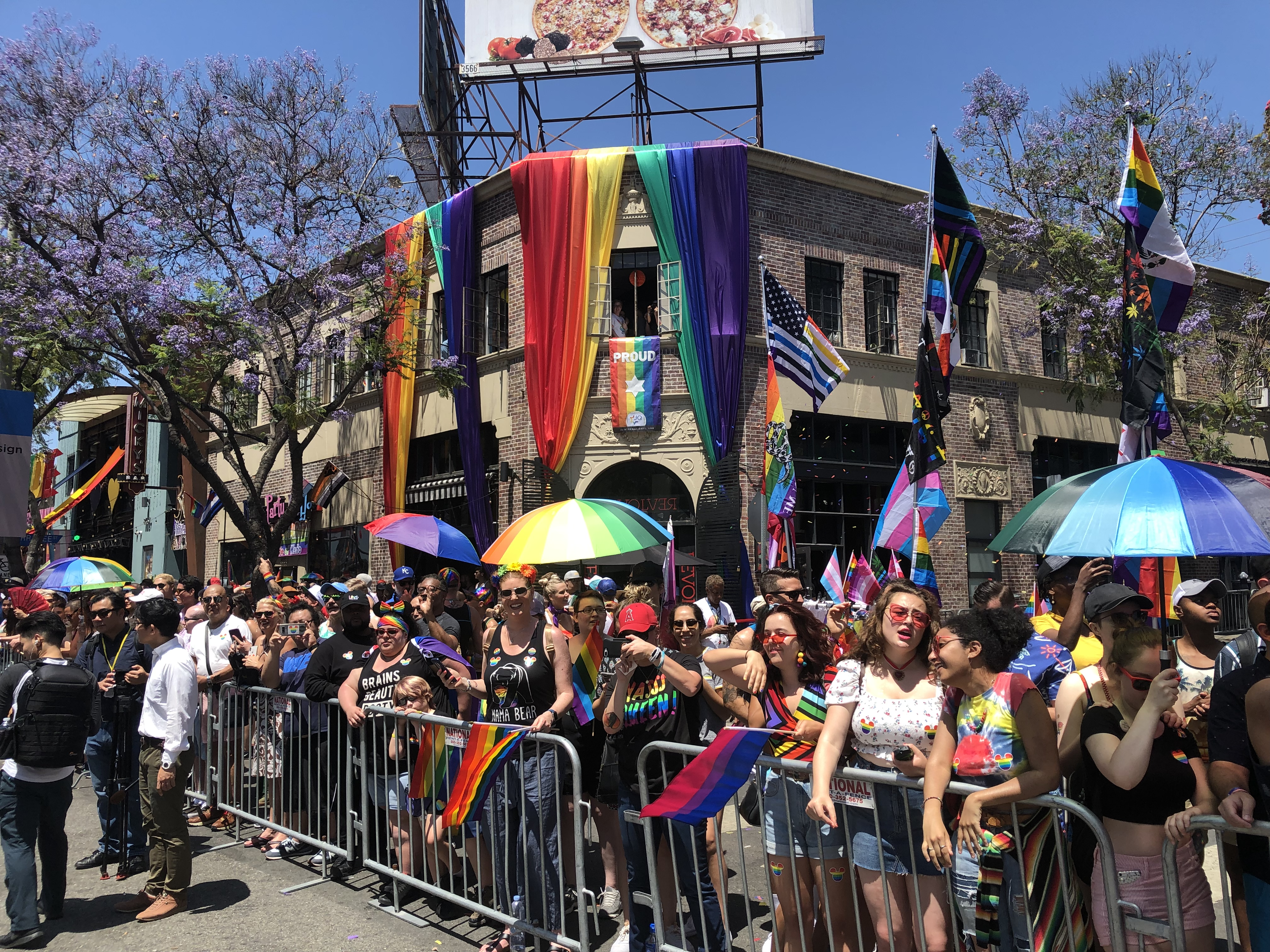
LA Pride 2019

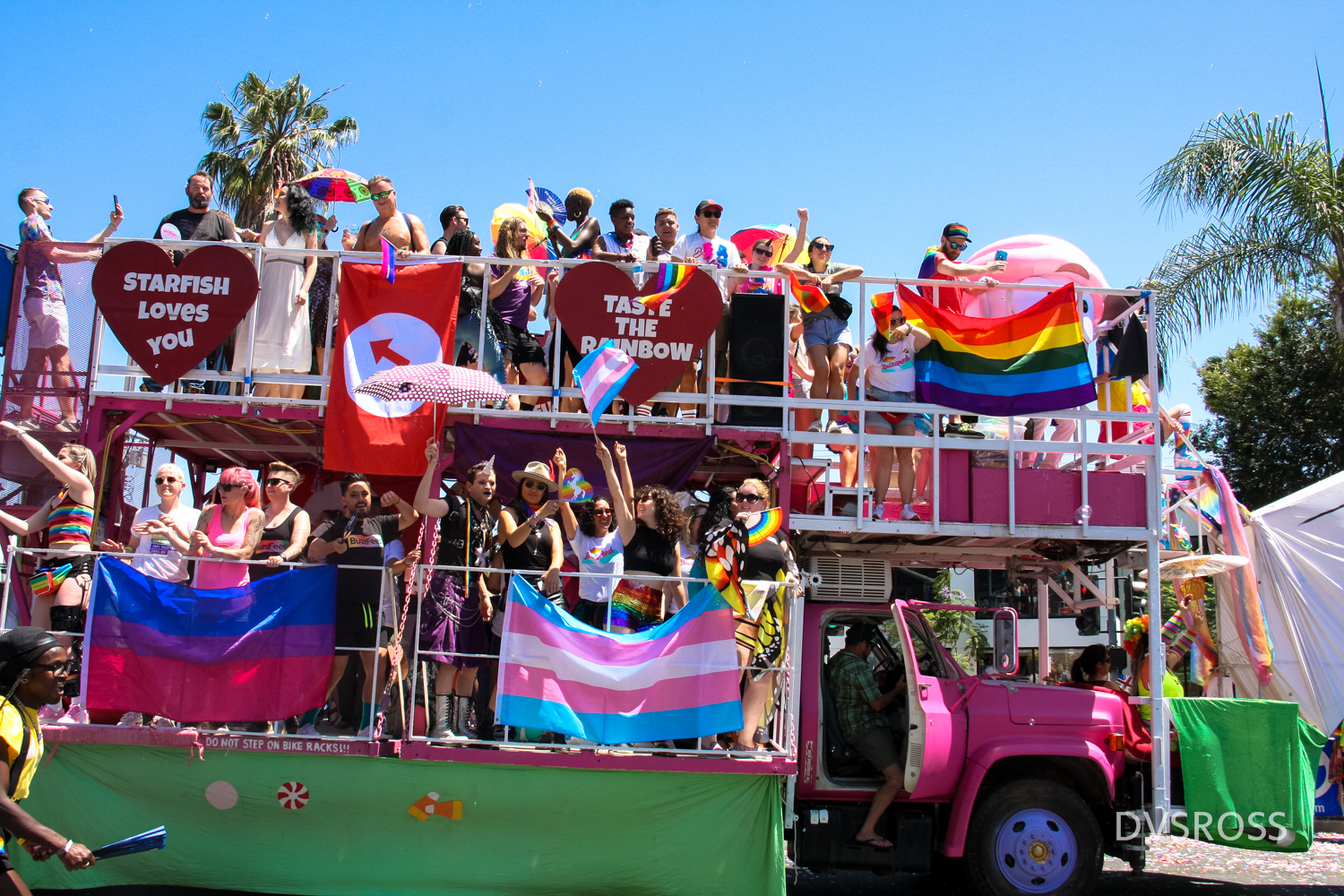
LGBTQ pride flags on a float at the 2019 Los Angeles Pride parade.

In 2019, LA Pride expanded its footprint on Santa Monica Boulevard with "Pride on the Boulevard," a free block party that allowed attendees to gather and watch local performers on both Saturday, June 8 and Sunday, June 9, and included new attractions like a Ferris wheel and a free show starring music and dance icon, Paula Abdul. Also that year, CSW signed a three-year agreement with ABC7 Los Angeles (KABC) to televise the LA Pride Parade. Raven's Home star and out lesbian, Raven-Symone, was tapped to co-host the two-hour live broadcast with KABC anchors Ellen Leyva and Brandi Hitt. Festival headliners included Meghan Trainor, Years & Years, Greyson Chance, Ashanti and The Veronicas, with numerous local artists, up-and-coming performers.

CSW commissioned an economic impact study for 2019 and found that LA Pride generated $2.5 million in tax revenue for Los Angeles County, and increased labor income for workers by $14.7 million in West Hollywood, and $7.4 million in Los Angeles. Additional findings showed that LA Pride 2019:

- Increased economic output in Los Angeles County by $74.7 million of which $27.7 million was concentrated in West Hollywood and $18.2 million in the City of Los Angeles
- Supported the annual equivalent of 830 jobs in LA County, including 397 in West Hollywood and 191 in the City of Los Angeles
- Estimated $896,100 in tax revenue generated in West Hollywood, and $332,800 in the City of Los Angeles

=== LA Pride 2020: Anniversary and cancelation due to COVID-19 ===
CSW was set to celebrate its 50th anniversary with LA Pride 2020. On March 12, 2020, CSW joined a growing number of event organizers and city officials, and announced it was cancelling all in-person events due to the COVID-19 pandemic. CSW pivoted to a "virtual parade" program and worked with its media partner, KABC, to produce the LA Pride 50th Anniversary Celebration television show, which aired June 27 at 8:00 pm.

=== LA Pride 2021 ===
Due to the continuation of social distancing guidelines and in-person gathering restrictions, CSW announced in spring 2021 that it would produce another virtual Pride celebration, and reserve the option to add in-person events if pandemic conditions improved. LA Pride 2021 included a free streaming concert presented by TikTok headlined by LA Pride alumni Charli XCX, a Thrive with Pride Celebration one-hour television special on ABC7, and "Pride Makes a Difference," a new, month-long calendar of events focused on volunteering and community service around Los Angeles. By mid-May, CSW had added two in-person events, LGBTQ+ Night at Dodger Stadium, and a charity partnership with Cinespia, the outdoor film event producers at the Hollywood Forever Cemetery. The last in-person event to be added was "Pride is Universal," the after-hours theme park party at Universal Studios Hollywood™

=== LA Pride 2022 ===
In 2022, LA Pride moved from West Hollywood and returned to its parade roots on Hollywood Boulevard. An estimated 146,000 spectators turned out for the LA Pride Parade on Sunday, June 12, 2022, Three Pride grand marshals were featured: performer and trans activist, Sir Lady Java, as the Community Grand Marshal, actor Mark Indelicato as the Celebrity Grand Marshal, and Paula Abdul as the inaugural Icon Grand Marshal. The parade consisted of 136 parade contingents and a 1.5-mile (2.4 km) procession. A new, free "Pride Village," hosted by The Hollywood Partnership, was added to the end of the parade route and featured drag performers, exhibitors, food and drink, and a Ferris wheel.

On July 22, 2023, LA Pride's official television and streaming partner, ABC7, won a regional Emmy Award for its live coverage of the 2022 LA Pride Parade at the 75th Annual LA Area Emmys.

The LA Pride Festival was re-branded "LA Pride in the Park" for 2022 and held for the first time at the Los Angeles State Historic Park, adjacent to Chinatown and downtown LA on Saturday, June 10, 2022. The festival event occupied over 20 acres (8.1 ha) of park space and the performers included Brazilian pop star, Anitta, Grammy-nominated rapper CHIKA, trans actor and singer Michaela Jaé "MJ Rodriguez," Rebecca Black, Bob the Drag Queen, Zolita, August Ponthier, and others. The headliner was Christina Aguilera.

=== LA Pride 2023 ===
On Sunday, June 11, 2023, the 53rd Annual LA Pride Parade increased its size from 2022 to include over 150 contingents, and adjusted its route to one mile (1.6 km), following Highland Avenue at Sunset Blvd, to Hollywood Blvd, to Cahuenga Blvd, to Sunset Blvd. The 2023 grand marshals were featured: the ACLU of Southern California in its 100th anniversary as the Community Grand Marshal, a Celebration of Life float for the late Leslie Jordan as the Legacy Grand Marshal, and Margaret Cho as the Icon Grand Marshal. The Second Annual "LA Pride Village" free street fair was hosted by the Hollywood Partnership.

Nearly 150,000 spectators watched the parade in-person. The parade was broadcast live on ABC7, and aired nationally on ABC News Live and Hulu. On July 22, 2023, ABC7 won a Los Angeles Area Emmy Award for its coverage of the Parade under the Live Special Events - News category.

On May 23, 2023, CSW announced that LA Pride in the Park, would return to LA State Historic Park, and be expanded to a two-day event held on June 9 and 10, 2023. Megan Thee Stallion would headline Friday June 9, and also include Fletcher, G-Flip, the Scarlet Opera, Dorian Electra, and RuPaul's Drag Race alumni, Symone and Gigi Goode.

Mariah Carey headlined Saturday, June 10, which featured King Princess, Jenevieve, Vincint, Mad Tsai, and Minke, drag stars Violet Chachki, Gottmik, and RuPaul's Drag Race winner, Sasha Colby.

=== LA Pride 2024 ===
The 54th Annual LA Pride Parade took place on Sunday, June 9, 2024. The grand marshals were George Takei, out Mexican luchador wrestler, Cassandro, and LAFD Chief, Kristin Crowley, the first woman and out LGBT person to hold the position. The route spanned over a mile and covered Highland Avenue, Hollywood Blvd, and Cahuenga Ave in the Hollywood Entertainment District. KABC/ABC7 covered the parade in a live broadcast from several positions along the parade path.

Also that day, the annual free street festival, "Block Party" was held adjacent to the end of the parade route, as part of LA Pride's free programming for the LA community. Block Party featured dozens of vendor and exhibitor booths, multiple sponsor activities, including a full-size pickleball court, hosted by Amazon, and stage for performers. Data collected by Placer.ai calculated attendance in the Hollywood Entertainment District during LA Pride 2024 was the most attended event of the year, with 156,000 visits. The second most popular day was Halloween weekend. LA Pride holds the record for most visits on any Sunday in Hollywood.

LA Pride in the Park, the ticketed concert and festival event was held on Saturday, June 8, 2024, at LA State Historic Park. The headliner was Ricky Martin, with performances by MUNA, Tokisha, JoJo Siwa, the cast of the MAX series, We're Here, and others.

Other partner 2024 LA Pride events included LGBTQ Night at Dodger Stadium on June 14, 2024, Pride is Universal, the after-hours exclusive theme park party at Universal Studios Hollywood on June 15, 2024, LA Pride Night in partnership with Cinespia, which screened the LGBTQ+ cult classic, D.E.B.S. at Hollywood Forever Cemetery on June 22, 2024, a Salon Series event hosted by the Getty Center, and Pride Night at the L.A. Zoo, Animals Aglow.

=== LA Pride 2025 ===
The 2025 LA Pride Parade took place on Sunday, June 8, 2025, and featured Celebrity Grand Marshal, Andrew Rannells and Vanguard Grand Marshals, Niecy Nash, and her wife, Jessica Betts. Trino x Adam served as Community Grand Marshals.

The parade featured a special "Heroes of the Wildfires" to honor the agencies and nonprofits that served with distinction during the devastating Eaton Fire in Pasadena and the Palisades Fire in January 2025.

Adjacent to the Parade route, the fourth annual free street festival, name reverted back to "Pride Village," was organized as a part of the free programming CSW provides to the LA community. Pride Village featured an expanded footprint with over 100 vendor and exhibitor booths, multiple sponsor activities, a VIP lounge, two bars, and two stages for performers. The stage at the intersection of Hollywood Blvd and Gower was designed as a boxing ring, and featured culturally significant ballroom competition, and multiple DJs, dancers, and performers. The second stage featured 12 music acts such as 76TH STREET and headliner, Alaska.

The ticketed concert event "Pride in the Park" was not produced in 2025.

On June 28, 2025, the Los Angeles County Board of Supervisors by proclamation declared every June 28 as "LA Pride – Christopher Street West Day" in Los Angeles County. In her Motion, County Supervisor Lindsey P. Horvath wrote:

Los Angeles Pride has a history dating back to June 28, 1970, when the nonprofit organization Christopher Street West (CSW) organized the first permitted LGBTQ+ Pride parade in the world. Held on the one-year anniversary of the Stonewall Riots, the event was a significant milestone in the history of LGBTQ+ civil rights activism.

=== LA Pride 2026 ===
The 2026 LA Pride Parade & Festival took place on Sunday, June 14, 2026. The 56th Annual LA Pride Parade opened with a dance performance by Banjee Ball, then commenced from the intersection of Highland Avenue and Sunset Boulevard. It proceeded from Sunset to Hollywood Boulevard, and followed its traditional route along Hollywood Boulevard toward Cahuenga Boulevard. The Parade was broadcast live by KABC-TV.

The 2026 Celebrity Grand Marshal was actor/comedian Jeff Hiller (known for his role in the television series Somebody Somewhere). The Community Grand Marshal was Mia Yamamoto, a transgender, LA-based LGBTQ+ civil rights activist and criminal defense attorney. The Legacy Grand Marshal for 2026 was Shirley Raines, founder of Beauty 2 the Streetz. In 2025, Raines won the NAACP Image Award for her work for the homeless in the Skid Row neighborhood of Los Angeles. She died on January 28, 2026.

The street festival, LA Pride Village, had more than 100 exhibitors, vendors, sponsors, and represented community organizations. Among the performers at the festival were Preciosa Night, Princess Superstar, CANDIACE, Bentley Robles, Cassidy King, Nekeith, and Amber Ryann, the Trans Chorus of Los Angeles, and the 2025 cast of King of Drag.

=== Parade grand marshals ===
Year	Celebrity, Icon, and Legacy Grand Marshals	Community Grand Marshals
1970	Rev. Troy Perry, Morris Kight, Rev. Bob Humphries	
1971		
1972		
1973		
1974		
1975	Minnesota State Senator Allan Spear	
1976		
1977		
1978	Harvey Milk	
1979		
1980		
1981		
1982	Martha Raye	
1983	LA City Councilman Joel Wachs	
1984		
1985	Rita Moreno	
1986	Patty Duke	Dr. Evelyn Hooker
1987	Mamie Van Doren	
1988		
1989	Maxine Waters	
1990	Cassandra Peterson as (Elvira, Mistress of the Dark)	
1991		
1992	Elizabeth Montgomery, Dick Sargent	
1993	Carol Channing and (composer) Jerry Herman	Jehan Agama
1994		Patricia Nell Warren
1995	Judith Light	
1996		
1997		
1998		
1999		
2000		
2001		
2002	Sisters of Perpetual Indulgence	
2003	Cyndi Lauper	ULOAH, Gilbert Baker
2004	Jennifer Tilly	PFLAG LA
2005		
2006	Kathy Griffin	Lupe Ontiveros
2007	John Amaechi	
2008		
2009	Chelsea Handler	OUT West, Organizations United Together West
2010	Sharon Osbourne and Kelly Osbourne	
2011	Johnny Weir	
2012	Molly Ringwald	The Trevor Project
2013	Maria Menounos	National Gay and Lesbian Task Force (now the National LGBTQ Task Force)
2014	Demi Lovato	Paul Katami & Jeff Zarrillo and Kris Perry & Sandy Stier (Prop 8 lawsuit plaintiffs)
2015	Rev. Troy Perry, Zoey Luna	Cast and crew of Transparent
2016	Jewel Thais-Williams	
2017	Alexei Romanoff and David Farah	
2018	Michaela Mendelsohn; Zoey	
2019	Ryan O'Connell	Phill Wilson, and Los Angeles LGBT Center
2022	Paula Abdul and Mark Indelicato	Sir Lady Java
2023	Leslie Jordan and Margaret Cho	ACLU of Southern California
2024	George Takei and Cassando	LAFD Chief, Kristin Crowley
2025	Andrew Rannells and Niecy Nash, Jessica Betts	TrinoxAdam
2026	Jeff Hiller	Mia Yamamoto, Shirley Raines

=== Philanthropy ===
==== USC Scholarship ====
In 1990, Christopher Street West in conjunction with the Gay and Lesbian Assembly for Student Services (GLASS) established an endowment at the University of Southern California with the purpose of funding scholarships for students pursuing degrees, and research for the improvement of the LGBTQ condition.

==== Casa del Sol ====
Casa del Sol is property located in Hollywood that CSW purchased in 1988. CSW entered into a joint project with AIDS Project Los Angeles (APLA) to provide low-income housing and support services to people living with HIV/AIDS. This arrangement set a precedent for other independent living programs for persons with HIV/AIDS, and has operating continuously for over 30 years. Casa del Sol was sold in 2025.

==== Supporting the LGBTQ community of Los Angeles and beyond ====
CSW sponsors or supports other events and community groups throughout the year, and conducts volunteer events and donation drives. Past beneficiaries have included Long Beach Trans Pride, The Laurel Foundation, Children's Hospital Los Angeles, Jolene's Night, benefitting trans artists financially impacted by COVID and Rainbowland Ball.

CSW and LA Pride are now integral to LGBTQ+ history in California and the nation. CSW has a permanent collection of documents, photographs and archival Pride posters, images and media at ONE National Gay & Lesbian Archives at the University of Southern California Libraries.
