= Rule of nines =

Rule of nines or rule of nine may refer to:

- Rule of nine (linguistics), an orthographic rule of the Ukrainian language.
- Rule of nines (mathematics), a test for divisibility by 9 involving summing the decimal digits of a number
- Wallace rule of nines, used to determine the percentage of total body surface area affected when assessing burn injuries

== See also ==
- Rule No. 9
