= Let Us Die =

Let Us Die may refer to:

- Let Us Die (documentary), 2022 documentary film
- "Let Us Die", song from the 2022 King Princess album Hold On Baby
