= Gender Revolution =

- Country of origin: United States
- Original language: English

Production
- Executive producers: Fenton Bailey; Randy Barbato; Katie Courico; Jeff Hasler; Mitchell Semel; Jeremy Simmons
- Producer: Emily Bina
- Production company: World of Wonder

Original release
- Network: National Geographic
- Release: February 6, 2017

Gender Revolution: A Journey with Katie Couric is a 2017 documentary film about gender identity, produced by Katie Couric, National Geographic, and World of Wonder. It originally aired on the American network National Geographic on February 6, 2017. The film's release followed the January 2017 National Geographic magazine issue of the same name, which also focused on gender.

== Plot ==
Katie Couric says that she was inspired to go into the television profession after watching the central character of The Mary Tyler Moore Show. She meets up with Sam Killermann in New York City. Later, she interviews a person with congenital adrenal hyperplasia.

Couric says that John Money theorized that "nurture can supersede nature."

Couric meets a family whose daughter is taking puberty blockers. Her guests explain the effects of gender-affirming hormone therapy. They discuss suicide among trans children who can't receive gender-affirming care.

Couric travels to San Francisco to meets with surgeon Marci Bowers and her patients; they say that they are "affirming" gender as opposed "assigning" it.

In this documentary, Couric interviews both young and old trans people.

Couric says that "many transgender people are poor, unemployed, and often the target of violence." Sabel Samone-Loreca echoes this viewpoint. Michaela Mendelsohn is seeking to provide economic opportunities to trans people in the Los Angeles area. Michaela Mendelsohn tells Couric that many trans women have low self-esteem.

Couric discusses the North Carolina House Bill 2 which was passed one year before the production of this documentary. Clips of William Barber II and Loretta Lynch are shown giving speeches in favor of trans rights.

Couric interviews Gavin Grimm in Virginia. Afterwards, she interviews Yale Dean Tamar Gendler.

Fa'afafine people in Samoa are non-binary. In Mexico, the muxe are feminine and non-binary.

Near the end, Couric interviews Renée Richards. They show a photograph of Richards and Caitlyn Jenner from the 1980s. Couric points out that Hari Nef is 23 while Richards is 82 at the airing of this documentary.

== See also ==
- List of programs broadcast by National Geographic
