= Jessie Mae Brown Beavers =

American journalist

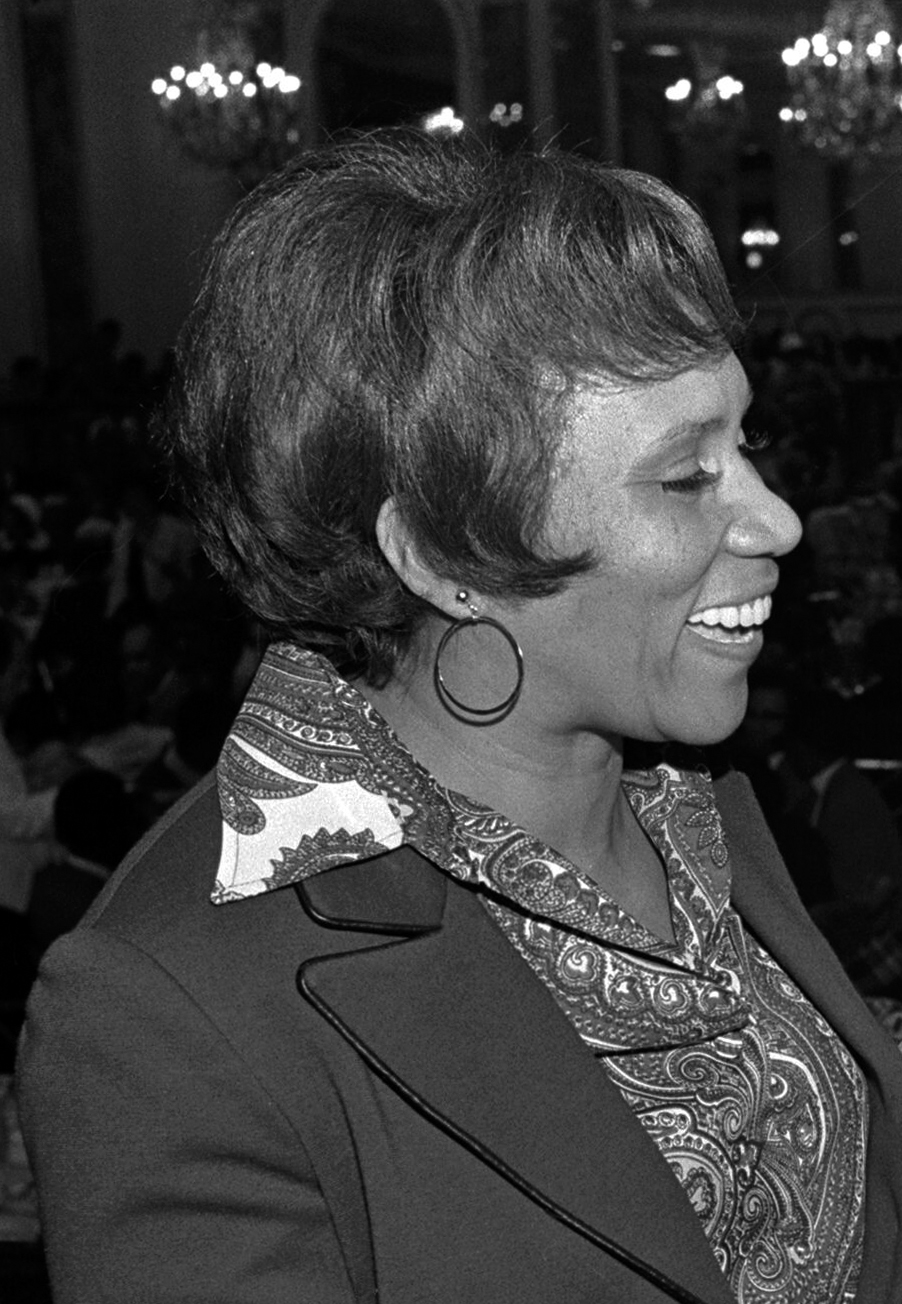
- Jessie Mae Brown Beavers, 1973
- Born: Jessie Mae Brown; March 18, 1923; Los Angeles, California
- Died: September 6, 1989 (aged 66); Los Angeles, California
- Occupations: Journalist, newspaper editor

Jessie Mae Brown Beavers (March 18, 1923 – September 6, 1989) was an American journalist based in Los Angeles, California. She was an editor at the Los Angeles Sentinel from 1949 to 1989, and served sixteen years on the city's Human Relations Commission, beginning with her 1973 appointment by mayor Tom Bradley.

== Early life ==
Jessie Mae Brown was born in Los Angeles, the daughter of Arnetta Hoyt Brown, a Baptist deaconess. She attended the University of California, Los Angeles, where she earned a bachelor's degree in sociology.

== Career ==
Brown was editor of the family section of the California Eagle from 1944 to 1949, when she joined the staff of the Los Angeles Sentinel as an editor. In 1966 she was one of the organizers and leaders of the Los Angeles chapter of the National Association of Media Women. In 1969, she was given the Outstanding Woman in Journalism Award by the University of Southern California chapter of Theta Sigma Phi.

Beavers served on the Los Angeles Human Relations Commission for sixteen years, after she was appointed by mayor Tom Bradley in 1973. On the commission, she worked closely with fellow commissioner Toshiko S. Yoshida during the American bicentennial, chaired the affirmative action subcommittee, and in 1982 organized hearings on racial bias in the entertainment industry. She also served one the Los Angeles County Music and Performing Arts Commission. She ran for a seat on the Los Angeles City Council in 1987.

Beavers was a member of Jack and Jill and the Lullaby Guild. In 1968 she was cited for her work by the President's Youth Council. In 1972 she was honored alongside Quincy Jones, editor Ruth Washington, and student leader Willis Edwards by the Committee of Women for Good Government. In 1973 she was honored by colleagues and admirers (including Mayor Bradley, judge Vaino Spencer, columnist Gertrude Gipson, and clubwoman Leontyne Butler King) at a tribute event at the Beverly Wilshire Hotel, hosted by singer Thelma Houston.

== Personal life ==
In 1947 Brown married insurance executive Leroy A. Beavers, Jr., nephew of Los Angeles businessman George A. Beavers Jr. Actress Dorothy Dandridge was one of her bridesmaids in the wedding. They had three children. In 1979, she was assaulted and robbed in the driveway of her home. She died in 1989, aged 66 years, in Los Angeles. Her grave is at Forest Lawn Cemetery in Glendale, California.
