= Cheap Queen =

- Standard edition cover. The deluxe edition features Princess in different make-up against a blue background, with the title in white above her.

Studio album by King Princess
- Released: October 25, 2019
- Genres: Pop; R&B; indie rock; trip hop; folk rock; hip-hop; lo-fi
- Length: 38:51
- Labels: Zelig; Columbia
- Producers: Tim Anderson; Shawn Everett; Teo Halm; Kid Harpoon; King Princess; Mike Malchicoff; Mark Ronson

King Princess chronology
Make My Bed (2018)	Cheap Queen (2019)	Hold on Baby (2022)

Singles from Cheap Queen
- 1. "Cheap Queen" Released: May 30, 2019; 2. "Prophet" Released: July 18, 2019; 3. "Ain't Together" Released: September 3, 2019; 4. "Hit the Back" Released: October 2, 2019

Singles from Cheap Queen (Deluxe Edition)
- 1. "Ohio" Released: February 11, 2020

Cheap Queen is the debut studio album by American pop singer-songwriter King Princess, released on October 25, 2019, through Mark Ronson's imprint of Columbia Records, Zelig Records. A deluxe edition of the album with five additional tracks was released on February 14, 2020. Straus began a tour in support of the album on September 20, 2019.

== Background ==
The album was written chronologically, with Straus stating that she named the album Cheap Queen after the drag term for a queen that is "resourceful, making something out of not very much". While Straus started her career with songs like "1950" and "Pussy Is God", The Guardian remarked that she swaps out those "queer pop anthems for understated ballads". Straus explained that the album's sound came about as she was "dealing with the most vulnerable year of my life" after the popularity of "1950", as she was under "complete stress and anxiety, and not knowing what to do with myself or with my body, and then also being in love".

Straus released a deluxe edition of Cheap Queen on February 14, 2020, which included five new songs.

== Critical reception ==
Professional ratings
Aggregate scores
Source	Rating
AnyDecentMusic?	7.5/10
Metacritic	81/100
Review scores
Source	Rating
AllMusic	4/5 stars
DIY	4/5 stars
Exclaim!	8/10
The Guardian	4/5 stars
The Irish Times	4/5 stars
NME	4/5 stars
Pitchfork	7.4/10
Q	4/5 stars
Rolling Stone	3.5/5 stars
Uncut	8/10

Cheap Queen received universal acclaim from music critics. On review aggregate site Metacritic the album received a rating of 81 out of 100 from 13 critics, indicating "universal acclaim". The album's sound has been compared to the works of Prince, Morrissey, Richard Hawley, Lily Allen, Madonna, Lorde, James Blake, Robyn, Imogen Heap, Fiona Apple, Billie Eilish, Maggie Rogers, Clairo, and Janis Joplin. Matt Collar of Allmusic praised how Straus examines themes of gender and sexuality "with a low-key sensuality that combines masculine hip-hop confidence with a soulful, feminist point-of-view". Max Gayler of The Line of Best Fit praised the album's "eclectic instrumentation and bold production" and the "one-two punch" of the album's closing two tracks, saying "King Princess hasn't reinvented pop, but she is bridging its most exciting chasms." Aimee Cliff of The Guardian complimented the "funk-driven" "Hit the Back", as well as King Princess's voice, which Cliff described as "often intimately close in the mix, brushing up against your ear, unglamorous and unadorned."

=== Accolades ===
Year-end lists
Publication	Accolade	Rank
AllMusic	Best Pop Albums of 2019	—
Consequence of Sound	Top 50 Albums of 2019	15
GQ Magazine	The Best Albums of 2019	—
The Guardian	The 50 Best Albums of 2019	46
The Line of Best Fit	The 50 Best Albums of 2019 Ranked	38
PopCrush	25 Best Pop Albums of 2019	—
Time	The 10 Best Albums of 2019	8
Uproxx	The Best Albums of 2019	30
Uproxx	The 35 Best Pop Albums of 2019	9
USA Today	Best Albums of 2019	2

== Track listing ==
Cheap Queen track listing
No.	Title	Writer(s)	Producer(s)	Length
1.	"Tough on Myself"	Mikaela Straus; Nick Long	King Princess; Mike Malchicoff	3:43
2.	"Useless Phrases"	Straus	King Princess; Malchicoff	1:16
3.	"Cheap Queen"	Straus; Long; Amandla Stenberg; Billie Holiday; Bob Russell; Carl Sigman	King Princess; Malchicoff	2:41
4.	"Ain't Together"	Straus; Justin Tranter; Long	King Princess; Malchicoff	3:22
5.	"Do You Wanna See Me Crying?"	Straus	King Princess; Malchicoff	1:46
6.	"Homegirl"	Straus; Long; Romy Croft	King Princess; Malchicoff	3:01
7.	"Prophet"	Straus; Aron Noah Forbes; Long; Tim Anderson	King Princess; Tim Anderson; Malchicoff	4:09
8.	"Isabel's Moment" (featuring Tobias Jesso Jr.)	Straus; Teo Halm	King Princess; Teo Halm	2:13
9.	"Trust Nobody"	Straus; Long	King Princess; Malchicoff	3:15
10.	"Watching My Phone"	Straus	King Princess; Malchicoff	3:00
11.	"You Destroyed My Heart"	Straus; Long	King Princess; Malchicoff	3:40
12.	"Hit the Back"	Straus	King Princess; Malchicoff	3:23
13.	"If You Think It's Love"	Straus; Kid Harpoon	King Princess; Kid Harpoon	3:23
Total length:				38:57

Deluxe edition bonus tracks
No.	Title	Writer(s)	Producer(s)	Length
14.	"Back of a Cab"	Straus; Long	King Princess; Malchicoff	3:07
15.	"All Dressed in White"	Straus	King Princess; Malchicoff	2:00
16.	"Forget About It" (featuring Banoffee)	Straus; Martha Betty Glenn Brown; Long	King Princess; Malchicoff	2:59
17.	"Best Friend"	Straus; Long	King Princess; Mark Ronson; Malchicoff	3:25
18.	"Ohio"	Straus; Anderson	King Princess; Shawn Everett	4:53
Total length:				55:25

== Personnel ==
=== Musicians ===
- King Princess – lead and background vocals (all tracks), songwriting (all tracks), production (all tracks), bass (tracks 1–4, 7–12, 14, 16), programming (tracks 1–10, 13, 14, 16–18), synthesizer (tracks 2, 4, 5, 7, 13, 14, 16), keyboards (tracks 3, 10–12), guitar (tracks 4–7, 10, 11, 14, 18), drums (tracks 9, 11–14)
- Mike Malchicoff – production (tracks 1–7, 9–12, 14–17), assistant producer (tracks 8, 13, 18)
- Nick Long – songwriting (tracks 1, 3, 4, 6, 7, 9, 11, 14, 16, 17), guitar (tracks 1, 4, 7, 9, 11, 16)
- Homer Steinweiss – drums (track 1)
- Leon Michels – keyboards (track 1)
- Jonah Finegold – guitar (tracks 3, 4, 9, 11, 12, 14, 17, 18)
- Michael Freeman – assistant engineer (tracks 3, 4, 9, 13)
- Amandla Stenberg – songwriting (track 3)
- Billie Holiday – songwriting (track 3)
- Carl Sigman – songwriting (track 3)
- Bob Russell – songwriting (track 3)
- Mark Ronson – assistant producer (tracks 4, 9, 16), production (track 17)
- Justin Tranter – songwriting (track 4)
- Edgar J. Sandoval – violin (track 4)
- DJ Dahi – assistant producer (track 4)
- Josh Tillman – drums (track 4)
- Logan McQuade – bass (tracks 5, 17, 18)
- Antoine Fadavi – drums (tracks 5, 11, 18)
- Romy Croft – songwriting (track 6)
- Aron Noah Forbes – songwriting (track 7)
- Tim Anderson – production (track 7), songwriting (tracks 7, 18), programming (track 7)
- Tobias Jesso Jr. – background vocals (track 8)
- Teo Halm – production (track 8), songwriting (track 8), piano (track 8)
- Kid Harpoon – production (track 13), songwriting (track 13), assistant producer (track 13), drums (track 13), programming (track 13), synthesizer (track 13)
- Martha Betty Glenn Brown – songwriting (track 16)
- Banoffee – background vocals (track 16)
- Melody Ector – synthesizer (tracks 17, 18)
- Shawn Everett – production (track 18)

=== Technical ===
- Emily Lazar – mastering engineer (all tracks)
- Mike Malchicoff – recording engineer (tracks 1–7, 9, 1–12, 14, 15, 16), mixing engineer (tracks 2, 5, 6, 8, 10, 11, 14–18)
- Oliver Straus – recording engineer (tracks 1, 7)
- Rob Kinelski – mixing engineer (tracks 1, 12)
- Casey Cuayo – assistant engineer (tracks 1, 12)
- Mark "Spike" Stent – mixing engineer (tracks 3, 4, 7, 9, 13)
- Todd Monfalcone – recording engineer (track 4), assistant engineer (track 15, 17)
- Teo Halm – recording engineer (track 8)
- Kid Harpoon – recording engineer (track 13)
- Samuel Witte – engineer (track 13)
- Chris Allgood – assistant engineer (tracks 14–18)
- Riccardo Damian – recording engineer (track 17)
- Ivan Wayman – recording engineer (track 18)
- Shawn Everett – recording engineer (track 18)

== Charts ==
Chart performance for Cheap Queen
Chart (2019)	Peak position
Australian Albums (ARIA)	41
UK Physical Albums (OCC)	86
US Heatseekers Albums (Billboard)	8
US Top Alternative Albums (Billboard)	18
US Top Current Albums (Billboard)	88
