= LGBTQ history in California =

The history of LGBTQ residents in California, which includes centuries prior to the 20th, has become increasingly visible recently with the successes of the LGBTQ rights movement. In spite of the strong development of early LGBTQ villages in the state, pro-LGBTQ activists in California have campaigned against nearly 170 years of especially harsh prosecutions and punishments toward gays, lesbians, bisexuals, and transgender people.

== 19th century ==
Prior to 1850, the 1821 independence of Mexico largely resulted in the end of the colonial Spanish Inquisition and its violent anti-LGBTQ persecution in the then-Mexican territory of California. However, economically driven settlement in the region by United States citizens resulted in the import of historically-English anti-sodomy laws from their home country, which was cemented by the U.S. annexation of California in 1848. In 1850, a common-law statute was installed in the territory of California, providing for the illegalization of sodomy and setting the penalty at five years to life. An 1855 law expanded the crime of sodomy to include "assault with an intent to commit" sodomy, penalizing the crime with 1–14 years imprisonment. A new criminal code, passed in 1872, retained the prior restrictions on sodomy without substantial change, but replaced common-law assumptions regarding "crimes against nature" with more explicit language regarding sodomy. Successful challenges to convictions for sodomy included People v. Hickey (1895), in which the Supreme Court struck down a sodomy conviction because the trial court did not inform the jury that an assault to commit sodomy could only be considered a simple assault, and People v. Boyle (1897), in which a court ruled that fellatio did not constitute a "crime against nature" (as per a prior case in Texas).

== 20th century ==
=== 1900–1919 ===
Between 1900 and 1902, 20 cases of sodomy were brought before the criminal courts in California, resulting in 16 convictions; 10 of these cases had taken place in the City and County of San Francisco, while 6 more had taken place in neighboring counties. In fall of 1914, some 500 gay men were arrested as "social vagrants", leading to the legislative passage of a unique law which prohibited "acts technically known as fellatio and cunnilingus." The law, which set a maximum of 15 years in prison for either act, was the only statute law in the United States which ever mentioned the words "fellatio" and "cunnilingus". The law against fellatio and cunnilingus would have interesting effects in the courts due to disputes regarding the exact medical definitions of both terms; the State Supreme Court rulings in In Re Application of Soady (1918) and Ex Parte Lockett (1919) would reveal the schism between the sitting justices, particularly Justices Henry A. Melvin and Curtis D. Wilbur, on those definitions.

=== 1920–1939 ===
In 1921, the penalty of sodomy was lowered to 1–10 years imprisonment. The same year, a constitutional amendment prohibiting oral sex (namely "the act of copulating the mouth of one person with the sexual organ of another") was passed, retaining the 15-year imprisonment as a penalty without regard to sexual orientation. Finally, a third act gave free rein to the government to prohibit and restrict any sexual activity, stating that "any act...which openly outrages public decency" would be punished. As a result of these and prior laws, California became notorious for egregious invasions of privacy, with numerous cases of residential espionage by neighbors, family members, rivals or hired private investigators; the majority of these invasions (including the drilling of holes into walls) went unchallenged by defendants in court. In addition, beginning with a law in 1909 which allowed for the sterilization of convicted and imprisoned sex offenders if they showed recidivism in prison towards being a "moral or sexual pervert" (including those committed for sodomy, fellatio, or cunnilingus) the allowance for the sterilization of inmates became so extensive that by 1934, some 9,931 inmates had been sterilized. A psychopathic offender law, the first to be enacted outside of the Midwestern United States, was passed in 1939, and would also add a further, constantly amended layer to California's laws regarding "perverts".

=== 1940s ===
The 1940s and 1950s saw the initial coordinated forays into the provision of services for LGBTQ people in the state. In 1947, Vice Versa, the first North American lesbian publication, was first written and self-published by Lisa Ben in Los Angeles. However, the first sex offender registry law was enacted in 1947, requiring all persons convicted under California law for sexual crimes since 1944 to register as sex offenders. Louise Lawrence, a transgender woman who began living full-time as female in San Francisco in the 1940s, developed a widespread correspondence network with transgender people throughout Europe and the United States by the 1950s. She worked closely with Alfred Kinsey to bring the needs of transgender people to the attention of social scientists and sex reformers. She was also a mentor to Virginia Prince, who, in the 1950s and 1960s, founded some of the first peer support and advocacy groups for "male cross-dressers" in the United States. In 1952, using Louise Lawrence's correspondence network for its initial subscription list, Virginia Prince and a handful of other transgender people in Southern California launched Transvestia: The Journal of the American Society for Equality in Dress, which published two issues. The Society that launched the journal also only briefly existed in Southern California.

=== 1950s ===
==== 1950–1954 ====
In 1950, The Mattachine Society, the first sustained American gay rights group, was founded in Los Angeles (November 11). In the spring of 1952, Dale Jennings was arrested for allegedly soliciting a police officer in a bathroom in Westlake Park, now known as MacArthur Park. His trial drew national attention to the Mattachine Society, and membership increased dramatically after Jennings contested the charges, resulting in a hung jury. However, the same year, Governor Earl Warren, who would become the Chief Justice of the United States Supreme Court in a year and a half, signed a law which eliminated the maximum penalty for sodomy ("not less than one year"), thus allowing for potential life imprisonment. The most famous individual to be arrested under the oral copulation and vagrancy law was civil rights activist Bayard Rustin, who received 60 days in jail in 1953 after pleading guilty in Pasadena to a lesser charge of "sex perversion" (as consensual sodomy was known in California at the time).

==== 1955–1959 ====
The Daughters of Bilitis (DOB) was founded in San Francisco in 1955 by four lesbian couples (including Del Martin and Phyllis Lyon) and was the first national lesbian political and social organization in the United States. The 1956 appellate court case People v. Giani stood out against the majority of judicial cases which sent numerous people to prison or involuntary psychiatric incarceration for a wide variety of sexual offenses; Justice Fred V. Wood noted for a unanimous court that based on "the absence of expert medical testimony on the subject we hesitate to equate the word 'homosexual' with the term 'sexual psychopath,'" and called for a new trial for the defendant. The 1957 case People v. Goldstein, in which Edward Goldstein had been convicted by a prior court for performing fellatio on a brick layer, a sailor and "sailors from Moffett Field", resulted in an overturn of the conviction by an appellate court due to numerous discrepancies in the initial conviction. In 1958, psychiatrist Karl Bowman requested that the California legislature repeal all laws criminalizing homosexuality, although it would be some two decades before the legislature would act.

=== 1960s ===
==== 1960–1964 ====
The first break in the regime of California sex laws took place in 1961, when the legislature replaced the vagrancy law with a "disorderly conduct" law. Also in 1961, José Sarria became the first openly gay candidate for public office in the United States when he ran for the San Francisco Board of Supervisors. The Rejected, the first documentary on homosexuality, is broadcast on KQED TV in San Francisco on September 11, 1961. The first LGBTQ business association, the Tavern Guild, was established in 1962. In 1964, Life magazine named San Francisco the "Gay Capital of the U.S."

==== 1965–1969 ====
In 1965, José Sarria established the Imperial Court System, which is now one of the largest LGBTQ charity organizations in the world. In 1965 Vanguard was founded by Adrian Ravarour and San Francisco Tenderloin youth for gay rights. The following year, in 1966, one of the first recorded transgender riots in US history took place. The Compton's Cafeteria Riot occurred in the Tenderloin district of San Francisco. The night after the riot, more transgender people, hustlers, Tenderloin street people, and other members of the LGBTQ community joined in a picket of the cafeteria, which would not allow transgender people back in. The demonstration ended with the newly installed plate-glass windows being smashed again.

The momentum generated from the riot led to transgender activists establishing a social support network of various social, psychological, and medical support services. This culmination of these efforts was the National Transsexual Counseling Unit (NTCU), established in 1968, which is said to be the first support and advocacy organization for transgender people in the world. The NTCU was funded by the Erickson Educational Foundation and was staffed by two full time peer counselors who provided street outreach, walk-in counseling, and answered mail that was received from around the world. Elliot Blackstone, a San Francisco Police Department officer who served as a liaison to the LGBTQ+ community, helped manage the office as part of his outreach work. The NTCU served the community until 1974, when SFPD officers framed one of the peer counselors and arrested her for drug possession. Drugs were also planted in Blackstone's desk, which led to him being reassigned to no longer be working with the NTCU. This led to the EEF cutting funding in 1974, which ended the NTCU's short life.

On New Year's Eve 1967, a raid by undercover LAPD officers on the Black Cat Tavern in Los Angeles, California, a gay bar, ended in several beatings and the arrests of 16 people. The violence of the police raid caused push back from bar goers including those at another bar, New Faces, located down the street, where officers knocked down the owner, a woman, and beat two bartenders unconscious. This incident inspired a civil demonstration on February 11, 1967, of about 200 people to protest the raids. The demonstration was organized by a group called PRIDE (Personal Rights in Defense and Education) – founded by Steve Ginsberg – and the SCCRH (Southern California Council on Religion and Homophile). The protest was met by squadrons of armed policemen.

The LAPD also began enforcing Rule No. 9 in 1967, a city ordinance in Los Angeles which made it illegal for performers to "impersonate by means of costume or dress a member of the opposite sex" without a special permit from the Los Angeles Board of Police Commissioners. The ordinance was notably used to prevent transgender dancer Sir Lady Java from performing. One of the earliest organizations for bisexuals, the Sexual Freedom League in San Francisco, was facilitated by Margo Rila and Frank Esposito beginning in 1967. Two years later, during a staff meeting at a San Francisco mental health facility serving LGBTQ people, nurse Maggi Rubenstein came out as bisexual. Due to this, bisexuals began to be included in the facility's programs for the first time. The first congregation of the Metropolitan Community Church, an LGBT-affirming denomination, was founded in 1968 in Los Angeles by Troy Perry.

On Halloween night in 1969 a riot broke out in San Francisco between the GLF (Gay Liberation Front) and the newspaper San Francisco Examiner. The Examiner was publishing anti-gay articles and the full names and addresses of gay men who had been arrested in bars, clubs, or tearooms. (tearooms were places throughout the city gay men used to have sex). When the GLF crowded outside the Examiner and started to chant and riot, employees from a few stories up in the building dumped large containers of ink onto the protesters. GLF used this ink to mark up the newspapers outside and scrawl messages like ‘Gay Power’ around the city, leaving purple ink handprints everywhere. This night has come to be referred to as ‘Friday of the Purple Hand’ or ‘Bloody Friday of the Purple Hand’. On December 31, 1969, The Cockettes, a psychedelic drag queen troupe, performed for the first time at the Palace Theatre on Union and Columbus in the North Beach neighborhood of San Francisco.

=== 1970s ===
==== 1970–1974 ====
In 1970, the first LGBTQ Pride Parade was held in New York City on June 28, 1970, the one year anniversary of the Stonewall Riots. Gay Pride marches also took place in Los Angeles and Chicago, and the first "Gay-in" held in San Francisco. On April 1, 1971, the Bay Area Reporter, a free weekly newspaper serving the gay, lesbian, bisexual, and transgender (LGBTQ) communities in the San Francisco Bay Area, was co-founded by Bob Ross and Paul Bentley. It is one of the largest LGBTQ newspapers by circulation in the United States and the country's oldest continuously published newspaper of its kind. It was known by locals for most of its history by the initials B.A.R. that were included in its nameplate until April 2011 and was originally distributed to gay bars in the South of Market, Castro District, and Polk Gulch areas of San Francisco. Today, the paper is distributed throughout the Bay Area and beyond.

In 1972 San Francisco became one of the first cities in the United States to pass a gay rights ordinance. Privacy was appended to the California Constitution's Declaration of Rights for the first time, protecting gay people from being outed by certain public organizations. In 1973 lesbian Beth Elliott was ejected from the West Coast Women's Conference because she was a transgender woman, following Robin Morgan's keynote address which denounced Elliott as a man and an infiltrator.

In 1975, a Consenting Adult Sex Bill was passed in California due to an extensive lobbying effort led by State Assemblyman from San Francisco Willie Brown. It did not repeal existing sodomy or oral copulation laws, but it did exclude private consensual activity between adults over the age of 18 from the reach of such laws. A further law in the same year reduced the maximum penalty for consensual sex with minors under the age of 18 to 5 years. Both laws essentially rendered the psychopathic offender laws moot, but the prohibitions on disorderly conduct and consensual relations between prisoners remained. In 1976 Harriet Levi and Maggi Rubenstein founded the San Francisco Bisexual Center. It was the longest surviving bisexual community center, offering counseling and support services to Bay Area bisexuals, as well as publishing a newsletter, The Bi Monthly, from 1976 to 1984.

In 1977, Harvey Milk was elected city-county supervisor in San Francisco, becoming the third openly gay American elected to public office and the first in California. Both he and Mayor George Moscone were assassinated by former Supervisor Dan White the next year. The controversy over the acquittal of White resulted in the 1979 White Night riots in San Francisco. AB 607, by Orange County Assemblyman Bruce Nestande, passes 23–5 in the Senate and 68–2 in the House and defines marriage as "between one man and one woman". The change came after same-sex couples seeking marital recognition apply in Orange County courthouses for marriage licenses alarming the clerks there. Opponents included Assemblyman Willie Brown and Senator Milton Marks.

In 1978, Samois the earliest known lesbian-feminist BDSM organization is founded in San Francisco. The anti-gay Briggs Initiative which would have banned gays from serving as public school teachers is defeated by California voters. Harvey Milk was instrumental in fighting the measure and opposition from Ronald Reagan helped defeat it. In 1979, Los Angeles passed its first homosexual rights bill with no fanfare from Tom Bradley but much support from arts. In October 1979, the San Francisco Bay Times, a free weekly LGBTQ newspaper in San Francisco, California, started as Coming Up!. Coming Up! was billed as "the gay lesbian newspaper and calendar of events for the Bay Area."

=== 1980s ===
In 1982, Laguna Beach, CA elected the first openly gay mayor in U.S. history. The first Gay Games was also held in San Francisco that year, attracting 1,600 participants. In 1982, Armand Boulay and Tom Brougham (who coined the term "domestic partnership") founded a political club in Alameda County (Oakland, Berkeley, etc.) in the Bay Area that later became the East Bay Stonewall Democratic Club. In 1983, the Oakland City Council passes a Gay Rights Ordinance prohibiting discrimination. In 1983, BiPOL, the first and oldest bisexual political organization, was founded in San Francisco by bisexual activists Autumn Courtney, Lani Ka'ahumanu, Arlene Krantz, David Lourea, Bill Mack, Alan Rockway, and Maggi Rubenstein. In 1984, BiPOL sponsored the first bisexual rights rally, outside the Democratic National Convention in San Francisco. The rally featured nine speakers from civil rights groups allied with the bisexual movement.

Also in 1984, Berkeley, California became the first city in the U.S. to adopt a program of domestic partnership health benefits for city employees. West Hollywood, CA was also founded that year, and became the first known city to elect a city council where a majority of the members were openly gay or lesbian. In 1984, bisexual activist David Lourea finally persuaded the San Francisco Department of Public Health to recognize bisexual men in their official AIDS statistics (the weekly "New AIDS cases and mortality statistics" report), after two years of campaigning. Health departments throughout the United States began to recognize bisexual men because of this, whereas before they had mostly only recognized gay men.

In 1986 Autumn Courtney from BiPOL (the first and oldest bisexual political organization) was elected co-chair of San Francisco's Lesbian Gay Freedom Day Pride Parade Committee; she was the first openly bisexual person to hold this sort of position in the United States. In 1987, the Bay Area Bisexual Network, the oldest and largest bisexual group in the San Francisco Bay Area, was founded by Lani Ka'ahumanu, Ann Justi and Maggi Rubenstein. On October 6, 1989, the San Francisco Police Department initiated a police riot following a peaceful demonstration held by ACT UP to protest the United States government's actions during the AIDS pandemic. The event, known as the Castro Sweep, led to multiple arrests and injuries as police officers swept through the Castro District, a gay village in the city.

=== 1990s ===
The 1990s and 2000s saw the incremental expansion of civil rights for LGBTQ individuals, but same-sex couples' rights became an increasingly controversial topic, with referendums and judicial cases on same-sex marriage jousting for constitutional finality. In 1990 the oldest national bisexuality organization in the United States, BiNet USA, was founded. It was originally called the North American Multicultural Bisexual Network (NAMBN) and had its first meeting at the first National Bisexual Conference in America, which was held in San Francisco, and sponsored by BiPOL. Bisexual health was one of eight workshop tracks at the conference, and the "NAMES Project" quilt was displayed with bisexual quilt pieces. Over 450 people attended from 20 states and 5 countries, and the mayor of San Francisco sent a proclamation "commending the bisexual rights community for its leadership in the cause of social justice," and declaring June 23, 1990 Bisexual Pride Day. In 1994, Sheila Kuehl became the first openly LGBTQ member of the California State Legislature. In 1996 the San Francisco LGBT Community Center was incorporated, and it opened its solar-powered, 35,000-square-foot (3,300 m2) facility in 2002. Its mission is "to connect our diverse community to opportunities, resources and each other to achieve our vision of a stronger, healthier, and more equitable world for LGBT people and our allies." In 1999, California adopted a domestic partnership law.

== 21st century ==
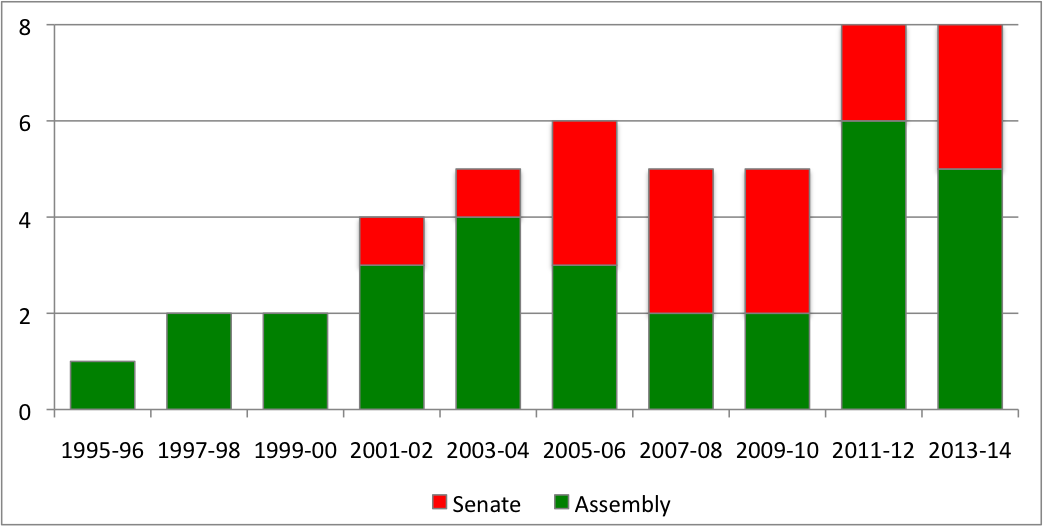
Number of openly LGBTQ California state legislators by session

=== 2000s ===
In 2000, the state passed Proposition 22, which restricted state recognition of marriage to opposite-sex couples. In June 2002 the California Legislative LGBTQ Caucus was founded; it is an American political organization composed of openly lesbian, gay, bisexual and transgender members of the California State Legislature. This group is contrasted to other LGBTQ Equality Caucuses in that the California caucus consists entirely of LGBTQ legislators while other LGBTQ Equality Caucuses consist of all orientations. Both, however, promote the promulgation of LGBT-affirming laws within the legislature.

In 2003 Theresa Sparks was the first openly transgender woman ever named "Woman of the Year" by the California State Assembly, and in 2007 she was elected president of the San Francisco Police Commission by a single vote, making her the first openly transgender person ever to be elected president of any San Francisco commission, as well as San Francisco's highest ranking openly transgender official.

Del Martin and Phyllis Lyon became the first same-sex couple to be legally married in California, and in the entire United States, in 2004, when San Francisco mayor Gavin Newsom allowed city hall to grant marriage licenses to same-sex couples. Eventually all of these marriages were voided by the California Supreme Court. However, after the California Supreme Court decision in 2008 that granted same-sex couples in California the right to marry, Del Martin and Phyllis Lyon remarried, and were again the first same-sex couple in the state to marry. Later in 2008 Proposition 8 illegalized same-sex marriage in California until 2013 (see below), but the marriages that occurred between the California Supreme Court decision legalizing same-sex marriage and the approval of Proposition 8 illegalizing it are still considered valid, including the marriage of Del Martin and Phyllis Lyon.

Also in 2004, the San Francisco Trans March was first held. It has been held annually since; it is San Francisco's largest transgender Pride event and one of the largest trans events in the entire world. In 2005, domestic partnerships in California were upgraded to where they had almost exactly same rights as heterosexual married couples. California state legislators became the first in the nation to pass a same sex marriage law, but it was vetoed by Governor Schwarzenegger.

In 2007, California became the first US state to allow same-sex couples to visit each other in conjugal visits. On August 27, 2007, Don Norte, one of the first openly gay Republican appointees to a governing body in Sacramento, was appointed by California Governor Arnold Schwarzenegger to the California Governor's Committee on Employment of People with Disabilities. Don Norte and Kevin Norte's association as grassroots leaders with Log Cabin Republicans (LCR) against the Proposition 8 ballot movement on a state level was documented by Ryan J. Davis. Ryan J. Davis, Davis flew out to Hollywood near the end of February to join a coalition of gay activists to lobby Gov. Schwarzenegger and First Lady Maria Shriver to publicly oppose the Family Research Council's Anti-Gay Marriage initiative. According to Davis, one of the group's main organizers, Kevin Norte, wrote on The California Log Cabin blog, "Someone had to fire the first shot. We did. We had some powerhouses there and the message was clear. We were not going away."

As reported in The Huffington Post, the coalition had a broad base, including Matt Foreman (former executive director, The National Gay and Lesbian Task Force), Damon Romine (former entertainment media director, GLAAD), Geoff Kors (former executive director, Equality California), Charles Robbins (executive director, The Trevor Project), John Duran (president, Equality California, and city councilperson West Hollywood), Charles Moran, the Log Cabin Republicans' former LA Chapter president and LCR-CA VP, 2010, James Vaughn (former LCR CA director)], and the organizers, Don Norte (Governor's Committee on Labor for People With Disabilities) and Kevin Norte (LCR CA member, and former LCR-PAC board of directors).

On April 11, 2008, Governor Schwarzenegger officially announced his opposition to the initiative at LCR's National Convention. At Log Cabin's 2009 convention, Kevin Norte received the group's "Grassroots Leader Award". In May 2008, the California Supreme Court struck down Proposition 22 in In re Marriage Cases. On June 2, 2008, Proposition 8 qualified for the November ballot in California. On June 16, 2008, same sex marriage became legal in California. On November 4, 2008, the Supreme Court ruling was struck down by when Proposition 8 passed in California, resulting in nationwide protests and judicial cases. Proposition 8 added the void text of Proposition 22 that "only marriage between a man and a woman is valid or recognized in California" into the California Constitution. On November 5, 2008, Proposition 8 went into effect. In October 2009, LGBTQ activist Amy Andre was appointed as executive director of the San Francisco Pride Celebration Committee, making her San Francisco Pride's first bisexual woman of color executive director. Also in 2009, the Supreme Court upheld Proposition 8 in Strauss v. Horton but also upheld the same sex marriages that were performed between June 16 to November 5. In 2010, however, Perry v. Schwarzenegger resulted in a victory for same-sex couples, by declaring Proposition 8 unconstitutional.

=== 2010s ===
In 2011, the State Legislature passed the FAIR Education Act, which makes California the first state in the Union to enforce the teaching of LGBTQ history and social sciences in the public school curriculum and prohibits educational discrimination on the basis of sexual orientation and gender identity. Also in 2011, San Francisco's Human Rights Commission released a report on bisexual visibility, titled “Bisexual Invisibility: Impacts and Regulations.” This was the first time any governmental body released such a report. The report showed, among other things, that self-identified bisexuals made up the largest single population within the LGBTQ community in the United States. In each study included in the report, more women identified as bisexual than lesbian, though fewer men identified as bisexual than gay.

In February 2012 the Ninth Circuit Court of Appeals upheld Perry v. Schwarzenegger. In September 2012 Berkeley, California became the first city in America to officially proclaim a day recognizing bisexuals. The Berkeley City Council unanimously and without discussion declared September 23 as Bisexual Pride and Bi Visibility Day. Also in 2012, California became the first state to sign a ban on therapy that claims to convert gay people into heterosexual. However, the law is as of 2013 held up in federal courts on first amendment grounds. In 2013, in the case Hollingsworth v. Perry (formerly Perry v. Schwarzenegger), which was brought by a lesbian couple (Kristin Perry and Sandra Stier) and a gay male couple, the Supreme Court said the private sponsors of Proposition 8 did not have legal standing to appeal after the ballot measure was struck down by a federal judge in San Francisco, which made same-sex marriage legal again in California. Kristin Perry and Sandra Stier were married shortly afterward, making them the first same-sex couple to be married in California since Proposition 8 was overturned.

Also in 2013, California enacted America's first law protecting transgender students; the law, called the School Success and Opportunity Act, declares that every public school student in California from kindergarten to 12th grade must be "permitted to participate in sex-segregated school programs and activities, including athletic teams and competitions, and use facilities consistent with his or her gender identity, irrespective of the gender listed on the pupil's records." In June 2014, Governor Brown signed SB 1306 repealed Proposition 22 and AB 607, bringing California statutory law into conformance with case law under the XIV amendment of the US constitution. In 2018, Ricardo Lara was elected as California's insurance commissioner, making him the first openly gay person elected to statewide office in California's history. In November 2019, transgender community leader Lauren Pulido raised the transgender pride flag over the California state capitol for Trans Day of Remembrance, reportedly the first time the transgender flag was raised over a state capitol building in the United States.

=== 2020s ===
In 2022, Nick Resnick became the first openly transgender person elected to help oversee a K-12 public school district in California, due to him being elected to the Oakland Unified School District board. In September 2023, the California State Assembly voted to recognize August as Transgender History Month, beginning in 2024. California is the first U.S. state to make such a declaration. In the same month, the Legislature passed a bill which levies fines on school districts for banning circulation of textbooks and school library books on discriminatory grounds, including representation of LGBTQ people or ethno-racial groups, becoming the second state to pass such legislation after Illinois.
