= Hold On Baby =

Studio album by King Princess
- Released: July 29, 2022
- Studio: Mission Sound; Long Pond Studio, NY
- Genre: Indie pop; alt-pop; electropop; pop rock; bedroom pop; progressive pop
- Length: 40:34
- Label: Zelig
- Producer: Mark Ronson; Ethan Gruska; Aaron Dessner; Bryce Dessner; Tobias Jesso Jr.

King Princess chronology
Cheap Queen (2019)	Hold On Baby (2022)	Girl Violence (2025)

Singles from Hold On Baby
- 1. "Little Bother" Released: January 14, 2022; 2. "For My Friends" Released: March 18, 2022; 3. "Too Bad" / "Cursed" Released: June 9, 2022; 4. "Change the Locks" Released: July 8, 2022; 5. "Let Us Die" Released: July 29, 2022

Hold On Baby is the second studio album by American singer-songwriter King Princess. It was released on July 29, 2022, through Zelig Records. The album was produced by Mark Ronson, Ethan Gruska, Aaron Dessner, Bryce Dessner, and Tobias Jesso Jr. Hold On Baby was preceded by four singles, including "Little Bother" (featuring guest vocals from Fousheé). A fifth single, "Let Us Die" (drums contributed by Taylor Hawkins) was released alongside the album. The album received generally positive reviews from music critics, who praised its production and instrumentals.

== Background and release ==
In 2019, King Princess released her debut studio album, Cheap Queen. In 2020, she released the singles "Only Time Makes It Human" and "Pain". The song "House Burn Down" was released in 2021.

In 2022, King Princess began releasing singles in promotion for Hold On Baby. On January 14, she released the song "Little Bother" with Fousheé. On March 18, she released the single "For My Friends". Alongside the release, she revealed the Hold on Baby Tour, and that it would start in September. She released "Too Bad" and "Cursed" in June, along with an announcement of the album and its accompanying artwork. "Change the Locks" followed in July, as the album's fourth single. The album was released on July 29, through Zelig Records.

== Recording and production ==
Hold On Baby features production from Mark Ronson, Ethan Gruska, Aaron Dessner, Bryce Dessner, and Tobias Jesso Jr. On January 8, 2022, King Princess revealed that her album was in the stage of being mixed. Foo Fighters member Taylor Hawkins, who died in March 2022, appears on drums on the closing track "Let Us Die".

"I Hate Myself, I Want to Party" was written by King Princess, partly in collaboration with Aaron Dessner, and in other parts with Gruska. "Cursed" was written by King Princess with Dave Hamelin, at the latter's home. Hamelin managed the track's production. King Princess additionally handled drums on the song. "Little Bother" came about as King Princess and the song's featured artist, Fousheé, shared direct messages with each other. The guitar loop on the song was provided by songwriter Zach Fogerty. King Princess wrote the song's chorus; her and the featured artist wrote the verses together.

"For My Friends" was written by King Princess, with Gruska and Amy Allen. The song is written as "a love letter" to her friends. The piano line in "Crowbar" was contributed by Aaron Dessner, though it was originally shared to Gruska, as part of an unrelated project. "Sex Shop" was written on the piano at King Princess' home. Her father aided her in recording the song's vocals. The creation of "Change the Locks" was inspired by a slump in King Princess's relationship with creative producer Quinn Wilson, which was caused by the Coronavirus pandemic. The song was created in collaboration with Aaron Dessner at Long Pond Studio in Hudson, New York. "Winter Is Hopeful" was originally titled "Quinn", as it mentions Wilson by name.

== Composition ==
The album's opening track, "I Hate Myself, I Want to Party" describes depression in a gritty manner and includes sinister-sounding production. The track intensifies near the end, as guitars play loudly next to the singer's vocals. "Change the Locks" also involves a guitar in its sound, while "Crowbar" makes use of heavy drums, and finds King Princess comparing her breaking relationship to the titular object. The latter number is sung over a light piano and drums.

"Winter is Hopeful" is a vulnerable track that makes usage of an R&B beat. "Dotted Lines" is a punchy, club-inspired track about being undervalued as a woman in the music industry. "Sex Shop" contains distorted noises and is filled with pop sounds.

"For My Friends" and "Cursed" are songs about platonic relationships; the former song slowly creates momentum using synths and drums, which have been compared to Robyn by El Hunt. "Cursed" involves a "spindling guitar... and a thumping, distortion-muffled bridge". "Let Us Die" is a fuzzy closing track which includes drums. Maura Johnston of Rolling Stone opined that the song concludes "on the musical equivalent of a cliffhanger".

== Critical reception ==
Professional ratings
Aggregate scores
Source	Rating
Metacritic	78/100
Review scores
Source	Rating
Clash	8/10
DIY	4/5 stars
The Irish Times	4/5 stars
The Line of Best Fit	8/10
musicOMH	3.5/5 stars
NME	3/5 stars
Our Culture	3.5/5 stars
Pitchfork	7.7/10
Rolling Stone	4/5 stars
Slant Magazine	3/5 stars

Hold On Baby received generally positive reviews from music critics, who praised certain attributes like its production, instrumentals, vulnerability, and vocals. At Metacritic, which assigns a normalized rating out of 100 to reviews from professional publications, the album has an average score of 78 out of 100.

Cordelia Lam of DIY called the album the artist's "most diverse, 'chaotic' sound to date". Tony Clayton-Lea of The Irish Times called Hold On Baby "a potential album of the year", singling out the closing track "Let Us Die" as "a throbbing, turbo-charged raga-like tune" that could rank among the best songs of the year. The Line of Best Fit reviewer Ims Taylor directed praise toward the album's instrumentals, and pointed out that the singer's level of confidence had increased on the record.

El Hunt of NME was less positive, saying that the "best moments on Hold On Baby unearth a raw sense of introspection"; the reviewer criticized the record's cohesion and pacing. Charles Lyons-Burt, writing for Slant Magazine, criticized the album's melodies, remarking that "never quite come to life as convincingly as they should". Pitchfork's Shaad D'Souza was positive about Hold On Baby, but disliked the fourth track, "Little Bother", saying that the song "feels too similar to [...] other emo revival songs". Martyn Young, in his review of the album for MusicOMH, opined that the record makes a strong case for the artist's talents. The reviewer had reservations about the restrained nature of Hold On Baby, saying that it makes parts of the album "[feel] a little disappointing".

Year-end lists
Publication	List	Rank	Ref
Rolling Stone	The 100 Best Albums of 2022	7	

== Track listing ==
Hold On Baby track listing
No.	Title	Writer(s)	Producer(s)	Length
1.	"I Hate Myself, I Want to Party"	Mikaela Straus; Aaron Dessner	King Princess; Dessner	3:54
2.	"Cursed"	Straus; Dave Hamelin	King Princess; Hamelin	3:20
3.	"Winter Is Hopeful"	Straus; Ethan Gruska	King Princess; Gruska	3:01
4.	"Little Bother" (with Fousheé)	Straus; Britanny Faoushee; Zachary Fogarty	King Princess; Fogarty	2:41
5.	"For My Friends"	Straus; Amy Allen; Gruska; Hamelin	King Princess; Gruska; Hamelin^{[c]}	3:35
6.	"Crowbar"	Straus; Dessner	King Princess; Dessner	3:47
7.	"Hold on Baby Interlude"	Straus	King Princess; Veronika Jane Wyman; Mike Malchichoff^{[m]}	1:45
8.	"Too Bad"	Straus; Allen; Gruska	King Princess; Gruska; Hamelin^{[c]}	2:53
9.	"Change the Locks"	Straus; Dessner	King Princess; Dessner; Hamelin^{[m]}	4:29
10.	"Dotted Lines"	Straus; Allen; Gruska; Tobias Jesso Jr.; Shawn Everett	King Princess; Everett; Jesso; Hamelin^{[c]}	3:42
11.	"Sex Shop"	Straus; Gruska	King Princess; Gruska	3:34
12.	"Let Us Die"	Straus; Gruska; Mark Ronson	King Princess; Gruska; Ronson	3:53
Total length:				40:34

Notes

- ^{^[c]} indicates a co-producer
- ^{^[m]} indicates a miscellaneous producer

== Personnel ==
Musicians

- King Princess – vocals (all tracks), electric guitar (1, 2, 4, 5, 8–12), programming (1–3, 5, 7, 8, 10–12), piano (1, 9), background vocals (2, 4, 5, 7, 12), drums (2, 7, 9, 10), synthesizer (2–12), bass (3, 4, 10, 12), keyboards (4)
- Aaron Dessner – bass, programming, synthesizer (1, 6, 9); piano (1, 9); acoustic guitar, electric guitar (9)
- Justin Vernon – drums (1)
- Thomas Bartlett – piano, synthesizer (1, 9)
- James Krivchenia – percussion (1, 6, 9)
- Clarice Jensen – cello (1, 6)
- Yuki Numata Resnick – viola, violin (1, 6)
- Justin Peroff – drums (2)
- Dave Hamelin – electric guitar (2, 8), programming (2, 5, 8–11), synthesizer (2, 8, 10)
- Gabriel Cabeza – cello (3, 5)
- Rob Moose – cello (3)
- Ethan Gruska – programming, synthesizer (3, 5, 8, 11, 12); electric guitar (8), bass (11)
- Fousheé – vocals, background vocals (4)
- Zach Fogarty – bass, electric guitar, keyboards, programming, synthesizer (4)
- JT Bates – drums (6)
- Ryan Olson – percussion (9)
- Shawn Everett – synthesizer (10)
- Taylor Hawkins – drums (12)

Technical

- Randy Merrill – mastering (1–3, 5–12)
- Dale Becker – mastering (4)
- Serban Ghenea – mixing (5)
- Shawn Everett – mixing (1–3, 6–12), engineering (10)
- Jeff Ellis – mixing (4)
- Aaron Dessner – engineering (1, 6, 9)
- Clarice Jensen – engineering (1, 6)
- Jonathan Low – engineering (1, 6, 9)
- Justin Vernon – engineering (1, 6)
- Kyle Resnick – engineering (1, 6)
- Thomas Bartlett – engineering (1, 6)
- Dave Hamelin – engineering (2, 5)
- Ethan Gruska – engineering (3, 5, 8, 11, 12)
- Zach Fogarty – engineering (4)
- Fili Filizzola – engineering (4)
- Kayla Reagan – engineering (4)
- Noah McCorkle – engineering (4)
- King Princess – engineering (7)
- Veronika Jane Wyman – engineering (7)
- Tobias Jesso Jr. – engineering (10)
- Oliver Straus – engineering (11)
- John Lousteau – engineering (12)
- Mark Ronson – engineering (12)
- Ivan Wayman – engineering assistance (1–3, 6–12)
- Trevor Taylor – engineering assistance (4)

== Release history ==
Release dates and formats for Hold On Baby
Region	Date	Format	Version	Label	Ref.
Various	July 29, 2022	Digital download; streaming	Standard	Zelig; Columbia	
Various	January 4, 2023	LP	Standard	Zelig; Columbia	
