= Girl Violence =

2025 studio album by King Princess

Studio album by King Princess
- Released: September 12, 2025
- Length: 34:58
- Label: Section1
- Producer: 18yoman; Aire Atlantica; Rob Bisel; Hoskins; Nick Long; Michael Malchicoff; Nate Mercereau; King Princess; Jacob Portrait

King Princess chronology
Hold On Baby (2022)	Girl Violence (2025)

Singles from Girl Violence
- 1. "RIP KP" Released: June 5, 2025; 2. "Cry Cry Cry" Released: July 15, 2025; 3. "Girls" Released: August 13, 2025

Girl Violence is the third studio album by the American musician King Princess, released on September 12, 2025, through section 1. The album was preceded by the singles "RIP KP" and "Cry Cry Cry". The album received mixed reviews.

== Track listing ==
Girl Violence track listing
No.	Title	Lyrics	Music	Producer(s)	Length
1.	"Girl Violence"	Mikaela Straus; Nick Long	Straus; Long; Nate Mercereau; Joseph Pincus; Jacob Portrait	King Princess; Mercereau	2:15
2.	"Jaime"	Straus	Straus; Pincus; Portrait	King Princess; Aire Atlantica; Portrait	2:23
3.	"Origin"	Straus	Straus; Rob Bisel; Jonathan Hoskins; Pincus; Portrait	King Princess; Aire Atlantica; Hoskins; Portrait; Bisel	2:14
4.	"I Feel Pretty"	Straus	Straus; Michael Baretz; Pincus; Portrait	King Princess; Aire Atlantica; Portrait; Baretz^{[c]}	3:02
5.	"Cry Cry Cry"	Straus; Long; Logan McQuade	Straus; Long; Michael Malchicoff; McQuade; Pincus; Portrait	King Princess; Malchicoff; Long	2:58
6.	"Get Your Heart Broken"	Straus	Straus; Pincus; Portrait	King Princess; Portrait	2:42
7.	"Girls"	Straus	Straus; Pincus; Portrait	King Princess; Aire Atlantica; Portrait	3:01
8.	"Covers"	Straus	Straus; Baretz; Pincus; Portrait	King Princess; Aire Atlantica; Portrait	3:01
9.	"Say What You Will" (with Joe Talbot)	Straus; Joseph Talbot	Straus; Pincus; Portrait; Talbot	King Princess; Aire Atlantica; Portrait	2:01
10.	"RIP KP"	Straus	Straus; Bisel; Pincus; Portrait	King Princess; Aire Atlantica; Portrait; Bisel	2:18
11.	"Alone Again"	Straus	Straus; Bisel; Pincus; Portrait	King Princess; Aire Atlantica; Portrait; Bisel	3:00
12.	"Slow Down and Shut Up"	Straus	Straus; McQuade; Pincus; Portrait	King Princess; Aire Atlantica; Portrait	2:53
13.	"Serena"	Straus	Straus; Vincent Goodyer; Pincus; Portrait	King Princess; Aire Atlantica; Portrait; 18yoman	3:04
Total length:					34:58

=== Note ===
- ^{^[c]} indicates a co-producer

== Personnel ==
Credits adapted from Tidal.

- King Princess – vocals, mixing, engineering (all tracks); Mellotron (tracks 1, 2, 9), drums (1, 8, 10, 11, 13); drum machine, drum programming (1); synthesizer (2, 4), orchestration (3, 7, 9, 11), guitar (4–8, 11, 12), bass (4, 6, 7, 10), percussion (4), keyboards (5, 9), piano (10)
- Jacob Portrait – mixing, engineering (all tracks); drums (1), synthesizer (2–8, 10–13), bass (2, 4, 5, 11, 12), guitar (2, 4, 6, 7, 10–12), Mellotron (2, 6), Wurlitzer (2), piano (4, 6, 7, 11), slide guitar (4), organ (7, 11), acoustic guitar (11)
- Aire Atlantica – mixing (all tracks), engineering (1–5, 7–13), programming (1–4, 7–13), drums (1–3, 5, 8, 10–13)
- Heba Kadry – mastering
- Nigel Wilton – engineering assistance (1–5, 7–13)
- Nate Mercereau – bass, drum machine, drum programming, guitar, synthesizer, engineering (1)
- James Krivchenia – drums, percussion (2, 4, 10)
- Dave Eggar – cello, orchestration (3, 7, 9, 11)
- Poppy Portrait – vocals (3)
- Antoine Fadavi – drums (5)
- Logan McQuade – guitar (5)
- Nick Long – guitar (5)
- Mike Malchicoff – programming, engineering (5)
- Paul Matelski – engineering assistance (5)
- Jon Nellen – drums (6, 7)
- Jack Manning – engineering (6)
- Joe Talbot – vocals (9)

== Charts ==
Chart performance for Girl Violence
Chart (2025)	Peak position
UK Independent Albums Breakers (OCC)	12
