= Talia (song) =

2018 single by King Princess

Single by King Princess

from the EP Make My Bed
- Released: April 13, 2018
- Genre: Pop
- Length: 3:27
- Label: Columbia; Zelig

King Princess singles chronology
"1950" (2018)	"Talia" (2018)	"Pussy Is God" (2018)

Music video
- "Talia" on YouTube

"Talia" is a single recorded by American singer-songwriter King Princess. It was released on April 13, 2018, by Zelig Recordings as the second single from her debut extended play Make My Bed. The song has been described by MTV as "a quintessential song about heartbreak, as the singer calls out to someone long gone and out of reach". King Princess has said that Talia was her way of dealing with heartbreak.

== Music video ==
The music video was released over a month after the initial release of the song and as of January 2022, it had amassed over 9.7 million views. The video was directed by Clare Gillen. The video features King Princess rolling around and caressing a sex doll. The video has been described as: "an emotional stand-in as King Princess gnaws and smokes her way through losing someone special." Amandla Stenberg who worked on the video as a colorist has said: "[the doll is] kind of ironic, self-aware idea of a sex doll, something that's generally discarded and abused by men. But you get to see a gay girl treating it with love and respect."

== In other media ==
"Talia" was featured in the film Mainstream (2020) starring Andrew Garfield and Maya Hawke.

== Personnel ==
Credits adapted from Tidal.

- King Princess – production, composing, lyrics, associated performer, bass, guitar, keyboard, programmer, synthesizer
- Mike Malchicoff – production, recording engineer
- David Baker – assistant engineer
- David Kutch – mastering engineer
- Rob Kinelski – mixing engineer

== Certifications ==
Certifications for "Talia"
Region	Certification	Certified units/sales
Australia (ARIA)	Gold	35,000^{‡}
New Zealand (RMNZ)	Gold	15,000^{‡}
^{‡} Sales+streaming figures based on certification alone.
