= Sapphic pop =

Subgenre of indie music and bedroom pop

- Stylistic origins: Indie rock; indie pop; bedroom pop; alternative rock; indie folk
- Cultural origins: 2010s–2020s, United States

Sapphic pop is a term used to describe a particular subgenre of indie music and bedroom pop typically characterized by the prominence of lyrical themes about queer love between queer (mostly lesbian) women and/or non-binary people historically situated within the sapphic sphere driven and performed by female (often femme) singers-songwriters.

The name of the subgenre derives from sapphism.

Tegan and Sara are the first well-known musical act that stood out with a musical approach by and for queer women centered on their lived experiences and relationships with one another, back in the 2000s. In mid-2010s, however, its concept began to take the shape upon which it would stablish in the following decade with the phonographic debuts of FLETCHER, Girl In Red and MUNA (as well as some recordings from the first half of St. Vincent's career to date) and the positioning of this topic as central to their approaches and narratives, a movement that would be followed a few years later by names like Billie Eilish, Chappell Roan, Clairo, Reneé Rapp, all the members of Boygenius since their solo careers and King Princess at her first musical releases. Additionally, some songs have been described as "sapphic anthems", for example, MUNA's "Silk Chiffon" (featuring Phoebe Bridgers from Boygenius), G Flip's "Queen" (featuring mxmtoon) and Chappell Roan's "Good Luck, Babe!" - which quickly became both Roan's most successful single and the pinnacle of the subgenre.

Despite that, some musicians like Gemma Laurence and other who do not fully identify with the term have also called their music "sapphic folk".
