= Hit the Back =

2019 single by King Princess

Single by King Princess

from the album Cheap Queen
- Released: October 2, 2019
- Genre: Indie pop; dance-pop; funk
- Length: 3:23
- Label: Columbia; Zelig
- Songwriter: Mikaela Straus
- Producers: King Princess; Mike Malchicoff

King Princess singles chronology
"Happy Together" (2019)	"Hit the Back" (2019)	"Ohio" (2020)

Music video
- "Hit the Back" on YouTube

"Hit the Back" is a song by the American singer-songwriter King Princess released as the fourth pre-release single from her debut studio album Cheap Queen (2019). On Twitter, Straus claimed the song was "the anthem for bottoms everywhere".

== Live performances ==
The song was performed on The Late Show with Stephen Colbert and Saturday Night Live on November 8 and November 23, 2019, respectively, alongside her other single "1950".

== Remix ==
A remix by Channel Tres was released on January 17, 2020.

== Personnel ==
Credits adapted from Tidal.

- King Princess – vocals, songwriting, production, bass guitar, keyboards
- Mark Malchicoff – production, recording engineer
- Jonah Finegold – guitar
- Emily Lazar – mastering engineer
- Rob Kinelski – mixing engineer
- Casey Cuayo – assistant engineer
