= Make My Bed =

EP by King Princess
- Released: June 15, 2018
- Genre: Electropop
- Length: 15:03
- Label: Zelig; Columbia
- Producer: Daniel Gidlund; King Princess; Mike Malchicoff

King Princess chronology
Make My Bed (2018)	Cheap Queen (2019)

Singles from Cheap Queen
- 1. "1950" Released: February 23, 2018; 2. "Talia" Released: April 13, 2018

Make My Bed is the debut extended play by American singer-songwriter King Princess. It was released on June 15, 2018, through Zelig Records and Columbia Records. It was promoted by the singles "1950" and "Talia".

== Critical reception ==
The EP garnered positive reviews from critics. Owen Torrey of Exclaim! compared the EP favorably to the work of Lorde and Troye Sivan and praised the emotional honesty and focus on themes of queer identity and relationships. Jackson Howard of Pitchfork echoed the Lorde and Sivan comparisons and also invited comparisons to Imogen Heap and Jack Antonoff, as well as praising its open discussion of queer sexuality and young adult romance.

Year-end lists
Publication	Accolade	Rank
Exclaim!	Exclaim!'s Top 11 EPs of the Year - Best of 2018	8
Idolator	The 20 Best EPs, Mixtapes & Playlists Of 2018	8
Rolling Stone	20 Best Pop Albums of 2018	10

== Track listing ==
Make My Bed track listing
No.	Title	Writer(s)	Producer(s)	Length
1.	"Make My Bed"	Mikaela Straus	King Princess; Mike Malchicoff	1:26
2.	"Talia"	Straus	King Princess; Malchicoff	3:27
3.	"Upper West Side"	Straus; Nick Long	King Princess; Malchicoff	3:31
4.	"Holy"	Straus; Daniel Gidlund	King Princess; Daniel Gidlund; Malchicoff	2:54
5.	"1950"	Straus; Long	King Princess; Malchicoff	3:45

== Personnel ==
=== Musicians ===
- King Princess – vocals (all tracks), songwriting (all tracks), production (all tracks), programming (2, 5), bass (tracks 2–5), guitar (tracks 2–4), keyboards (tracks 2–4), synthesizer (track 2), drums (tracks 3, 4)
- Mike Malchicoff – production (all tracks)
- Nick Long – songwriting (tracks 3, 5), guitar (track 3)
- Daniel Gidlung – songwriting (track 4)

=== Technical ===
- Dave Kutch – mastering engineer (tracks 1–3, 5)
- Patrick Karnik – mastering engineer (track 4)
- Mike Malchicoff – recording engineer (all tracks), mixing engineer (tracks 1, 3–5)
- Tommy Brenneck – mixing engineer (track 5)
- Rob Kinelski – mixing engineer (track 2)
- David Baker – assistant engineer (track 2)

== Certifications ==
Certifications for Make My Bed
Region	Certification	Certified units/sales
Australia (ARIA)	2× Platinum	140,000^{‡}
New Zealand (RMNZ)	Gold	7,500^{‡}
^{‡} Sales+streaming figures based on certification alone.
