= King Princess =

American musician (born 1998)

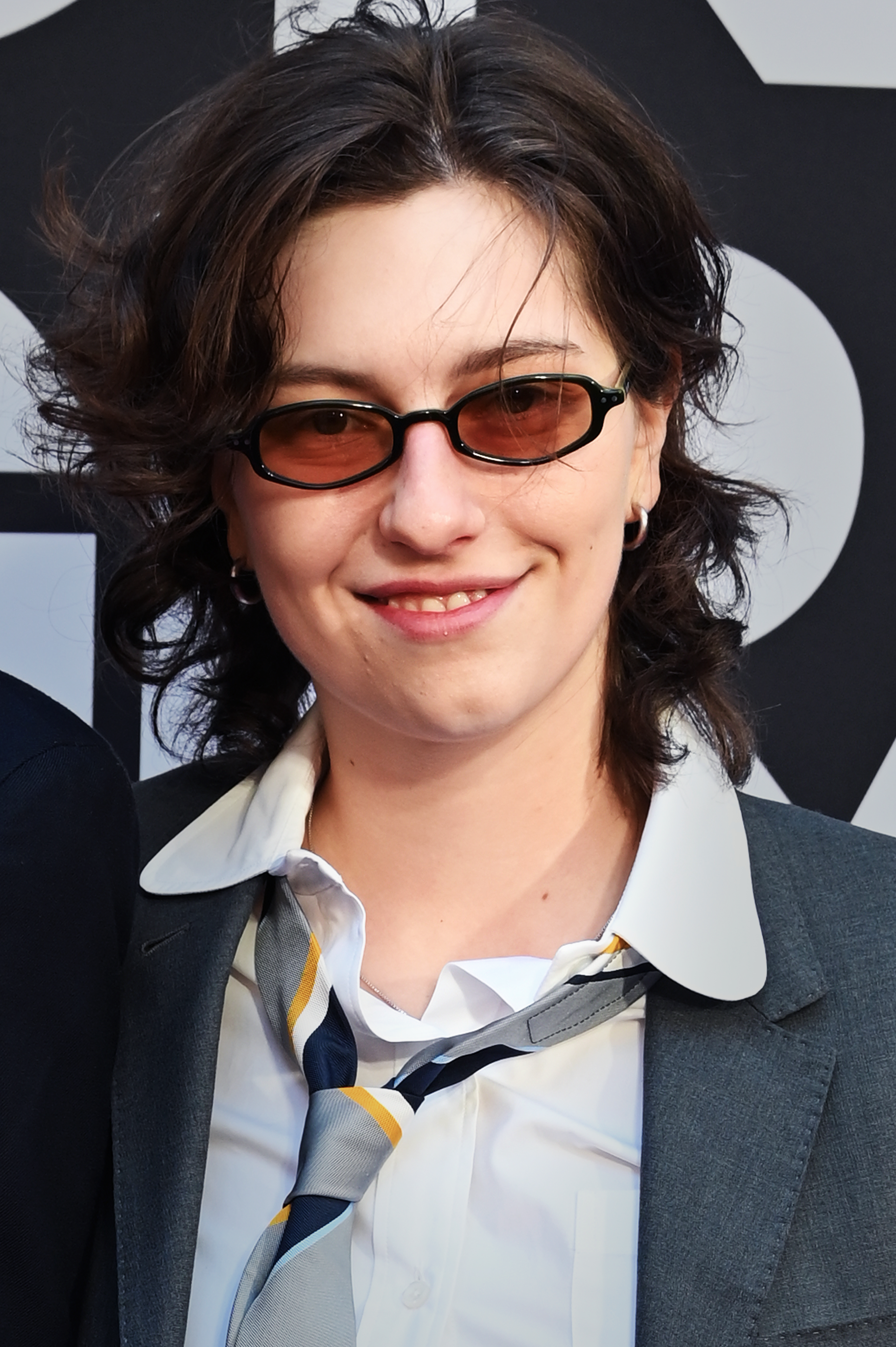
- King Princess in 2025
- Born: Mikaela Mullaney Straus; December 19, 1998 (age 27); New York City, U.S.
- Occupations: Singer; musician; songwriter; actor
- Years active: 2015–present
- Relatives: Straus family
- Musical career
- Genres: Pop; indie pop; pop rock; sapphic pop; funk-pop
- Instruments: Vocals; guitar
- Label: Section1
- Website: kingprincessmusic.com

Mikaela Mullaney Straus (born December 19, 1998), known professionally as King Princess, is an American singer, songwriter, multi-instrumentalist and actor from Brooklyn, New York. She was signed to Mark Ronson's label Zelig Records, an imprint of Columbia Records. In February 2018, she released her debut single "1950", from her debut extended play (EP) Make My Bed, released later that year. The song was a commercial success, charting in multiple territories, and was later certified platinum by the Recording Industry Association of America (RIAA). Her second single, "Talia", was certified gold in Australia by the Australian Recording Industry Association (ARIA). King Princess released her debut studio album Cheap Queen in 2019 to widespread critical acclaim. She left Zelig Records before the release of her 2025 album Girl Violence, which was released by Section1. She made her acting debut in the 2025 show Nine Perfect Strangers.

== Early life and education ==
Straus was born and raised in Williamsburg, Brooklyn, New York City, on December 19, 1998, the child of recording engineer Oliver H. Straus Jr. and Agnes "Aggie" Mullaney. Her parents divorced when she was young. On her mother's side, she is of Irish, Italian, and Polish descent. On her father's side, she is descended from German Jewish families, who emigrated to the United States from the Kingdom of Bavaria and Rhineland-Palatinate. Her great-great-grandparents include Isidor Straus, a U.S. Congressman and co-owner of Macy's, and Ida Straus. The couple died in the sinking of the British passenger liner Titanic. However, Straus stated in a Rolling Stone interview that she is not an heiress and did not inherit any fortune.

Straus spent much of her childhood following her father to work at his recording studio, Mission Sound. There, she learned several instruments, including bass, guitar, piano, and drums, as well as music-production techniques and insight into the music industry. Straus' inspiration in those years had come from rock bands, including Led Zeppelin, T. Rex, and Jack White. In 2012, she received a scholarship to attend Avenues: The World School, a private school in Manhattan, after submitting a CD of songs she had written.

After high school, Straus moved to Los Angeles to study at the USC Thornton School of Music. She dropped out after a year to pursue her music career.

== Career ==
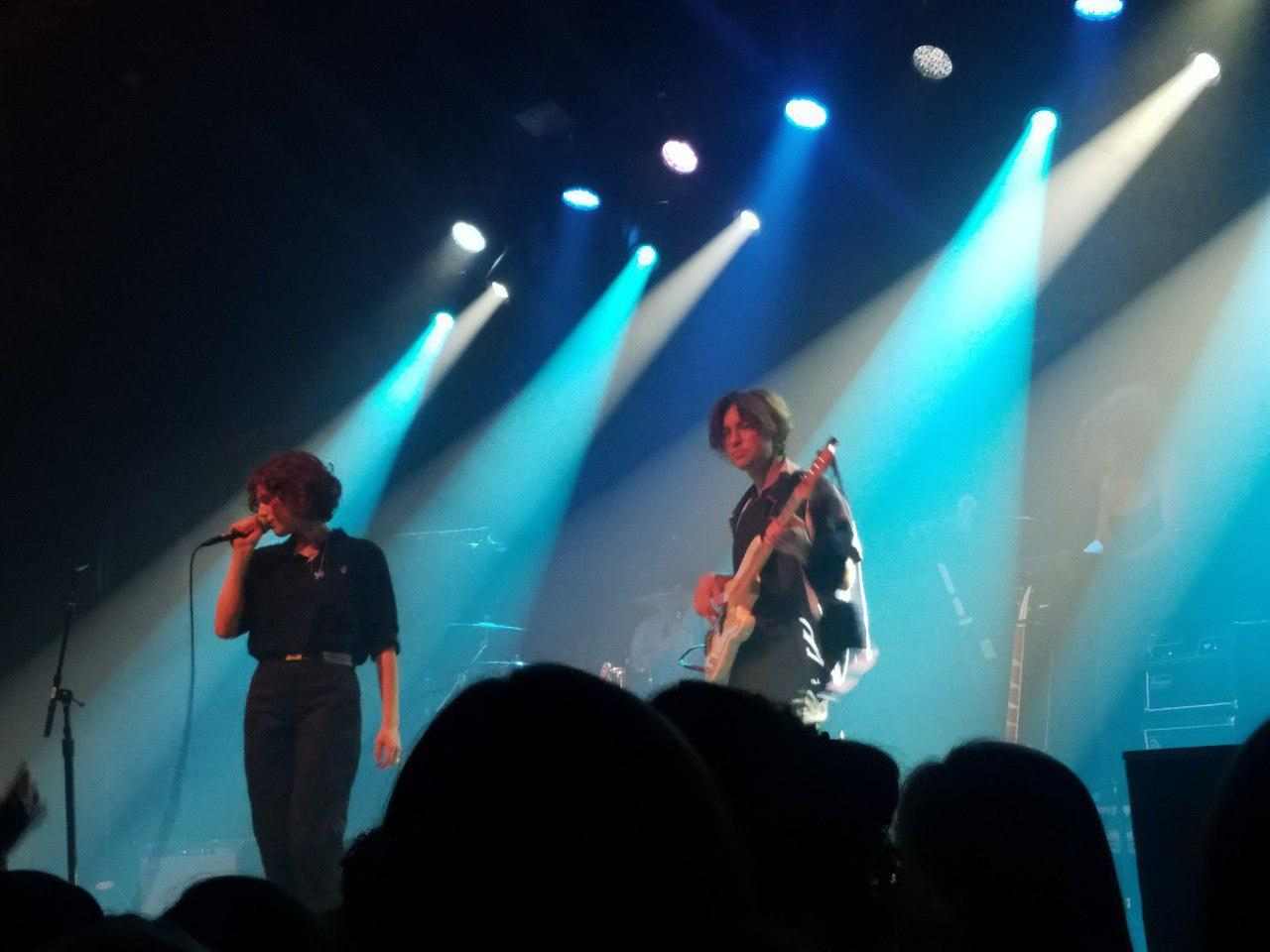
King Princess performing at Royale in Boston in 2018

A record label offered to sign Straus at the age of 11, but she refused to do so because of her experience watching other artists work with a music label in her father's studio. The labels would control the artists' products and change the feel of the music. She did not want to sign with a record label until she had a definition of her music, how she wanted to run the production, and with whom she would work.

In February 2018, King Princess released the debut single, "1950". The song is a tribute to the romance novel The Price of Salt (1952) by Patricia Highsmith, to the LGBT community and to queer love. The song reached a wide audience when English singer and songwriter Harry Styles tweeted a lyric from the song. Straus followed this with a second single, "Talia", in April. She released her debut extended play, Make My Bed, on June 15, 2018. Later that year, she earned Breakout Pop Artist of the Year honors from Vivid Seats.

In 2019, it was announced that King Princess would perform at Lollapalooza and Coachella. She played The Park stage at the 2019 Glastonbury Festival and was joined by Mark Ronson (dressed as King Princess) for a performance of her collaboration "Pieces of Us" from his 2019 studio album Late Night Feelings. Zelig Recordings released King Princess' debut studio album Cheap Queen on October 25, 2019. She produced much of the album itself, including programming many of the instruments. In November 2019, King Princess was revealed to be the opening act for the European leg of Harry Styles' planned 2020 concert tour, Love On Tour. King Princess performed as the musical guest on Saturday Night Live (season 45, episode 7) on November 23, 2019. She released a deluxe edition of Cheap Queen on February 14, 2020. The release included five previously unreleased new songs, including "Ohio".

In October 2020, King Princess released a new single, "Only Time Makes It Human", followed by "Pain" in November. In a November 2020 interview with Zane Lowe, she confirmed that she was working on her second album with Mark Ronson.

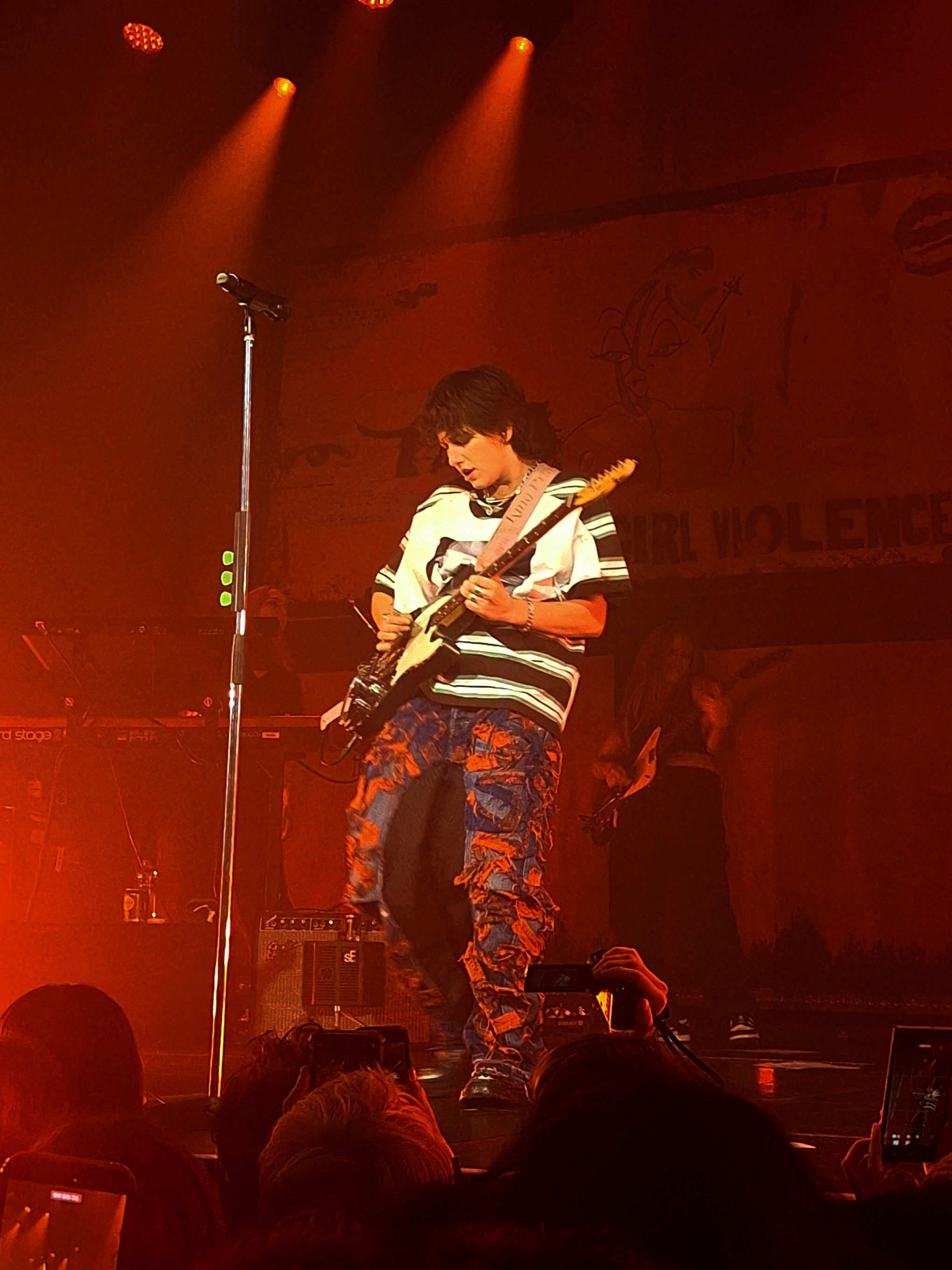
King Princess performing in Amsterdam in 2025

In 2022, King Princess joined Kacey Musgraves on her Star-Crossed: Unveiled tour as an opening act. She also opened for Shawn Mendes' Wonder: The World Tour and opened for the Red Hot Chili Peppers on their Global Stadium Tour. King Princess was also a judge on the Netflix game show style cooking competition television series Is It Cake?

On July 29, 2022, King Princess released her second album Hold On Baby and from July through October 2022, she embarked on her Hold On Baby North American tour with openers Dora Jar and St. Panther. She also featured guests, such as Julian Casablancas at Radio City Music Hall in New York City, where they covered "You Only Live Once".

Her song "Fantastic" featured on the soundtrack for the second season of the animated TV show Arcane, which released on November 23rd, 2024.

In 2025, King Princess made her acting debut in the second season of the Hulu series Nine Perfect Strangers, playing the main role of Tina. That same year, she appeared in the 2025 biographical musical drama film Song Sung Blue. She appears in the 2026 film One Night Only. She is scheduled to make her theatrical debut in a musical adaptation of Girl, Interrupted at The Public Theater.

== Personal life ==
Straus is genderqueer and identifies as a lesbian; her identification as a lesbian became the subject of debate after she discussed having sex with men and rejected the bisexual label. During 2018, she dated actress Amandla Stenberg. In early 2019, Straus began a relationship with Quinn Whitney Wilson, the creative director of rapper and singer Lizzo; they broke up at the end of 2023.

Regarding her gender identity, she has said in a 2019 interview with W magazine, "I like being a woman sometimes. I would say 49 percent of the time I love my titties. But I'm not fully a woman. I'm somebody who falls center on the gender spectrum, and it changes from day to day. It's just not in me to decide." In 2023, Straus posted, "I'm tired of pretending I am normal. I am non-binary!!!" on Instagram, and has also made a number of other posts about gender. Regarding pronouns, King Princess stated to Rolling Stone in 2022 that she "never felt offended [by] the pronoun situation... He. She. It. They. Xenogender."

== Discography ==
King Princess discography
- Studio albums: 3
- EPs: 2
- Singles: 15
- Promotional singles: 5

=== Studio albums ===
Title	Details	Peak chart positions				
Title	Details	US Current	US Heat	US Alt	AUS	UK Physical
Cheap Queen	Released: October 25, 2019; Label: Zelig, Columbia; Formats: CD, digital download, streaming, vinyl	88	8	18	41	86
Hold On Baby	Released: July 29, 2022; Label: Zelig; Formats: CD, digital download, streaming, vinyl	—	—	—	—	—
Girl Violence	Released: September 12, 2025; Label: Section1; Formats: CD, digital download, streaming, vinyl	—	—	—	—	—

=== Extended plays ===
Title	EP details	Peak chart positions
Title	EP details	NZ Heat.
Make My Bed	Released: June 15, 2018; Label: Zelig; Format: Digital download, streaming	1
Up Next Live from Apple Williamsburg	Released: August 5, 2019; Label: Zelig; Format: Digital download, streaming	—
"—" denotes a recording that did not chart.

=== Singles ===
==== As lead artist ====
Title	Year	Peak chart positions									Certifications	Album
Title	Year	US Alt. Air.	AUS	AUT	BEL (FL)	CAN	NLD	NZ Hot	SWE	SWI	Certifications	Album
"1950"	2018	17	25	75	48	82	83	—	87	94	RIAA: Platinum; ARIA: 2× Platinum; BPI: Gold; MC: Gold	Make My Bed
"Talia"	2018	—	—	—	—	—	—	—	—	—	ARIA: Gold; RMNZ: Gold	Make My Bed
"Pussy Is God"	2018	—	—	—	—	—	—	17	—	—		Non-album single
"Cheap Queen"	2019	—	—	—	98	—	—	17	—	—		Cheap Queen
"Prophet"	2019	—	—	—	—	—	—	17	—	—		Cheap Queen
"Ain't Together"	2019	—	—	—	—	—	—	—	—	—		Cheap Queen
"Hit the Back"	2019	—	—	—	—	—	—	—	—	—		Cheap Queen
"Ohio"	2020	—	—	—	—	—	—	—	—	—		Cheap Queen
"Only Time Makes It Human"	2020	—	—	—	—	—	—	33	—	—		Non-album singles
"Pain"	2020	—	—	—	—	—	—	—	—	—		Non-album singles
"House Burn Down"	2021	—	—	—	—	—	—	—	—	—		Non-album singles
"Little Bother" (with Fousheé)	2022	—	—	—	—	—	—	—	—	—		Hold On Baby
"For My Friends"	2022	—	—	—	—	—	—	—	—	—		Hold On Baby
"Too Bad"	2022	—	—	—	—	—	—	—	—	—		Hold On Baby
"Cursed"	2022	—	—	—	—	—	—	—	—	—		Hold On Baby
"Change the Locks"	2022	—	—	—	—	—	—	—	—	—		Hold On Baby
"Let Us Die"	2022	—	—	—	—	—	—	—	—	—		Hold On Baby
"The Bend"	2023	—	—	—	—	—	—	—	—	—		NME x Bose's C32
"RIP KP"	2025	—	—	—	—	—	—	—	—	—		Girl Violence
"Cry Cry Cry"	2025	—	—	—	—	—	—	—	—	—		Girl Violence
"Girls"	2025	—	—	—	—	—	—	—	—	—		Girl Violence
"Cherry"	2025	—	—	—	—	—	—	—	—	—		Non-album single
"—" denotes a recording that did not chart or was not released in that territory.

==== As featured artist ====
Title	Year	Peak chart position	Album
Title	Year	NZ Hot	Album
"Pieces of Us" (Mark Ronson featuring King Princess)	2019	24	Late Night Feelings

==== Promotional singles ====
List of singles, showing year released and album name
Title	Year	Album
"Femme Fatale" (RISE Recording)	2018	Non-album singles
"I Know" (RISE Recording) (featuring Fiona Apple)	2019	Non-album singles
"Happy Together" (with Mark Ronson)	2019	Non-album singles
"Monster"	2020	Adventure Time: Distant Lands – Obsidian (Original Soundtrack) [Deluxe Edition]
"There She Goes Again"	2021	I'll Be Your Mirror: A Tribute to The Velvet Underground & Nico

=== Other charted songs ===
Title	Year	Peak chart position		Album
Title	Year	US Rock	NZ Hot	Album
"Fantastic"	2024	27	14	Arcane League of Legends: Season 2

=== Music videos ===
Title	Year	Director
"1950"	2018	Clare Gillen
"Talia"	2018	Clare Gillen
"Make My Bed"	2018	Mikey Alfred
"Holy"	2018	Clare Gillen and Scott Ross
"Upper West Side"	2018	Clare Gillen
"Pussy Is God"	2018	Clare Gillen
"Cheap Queen"	2019	Symone Ridgell
"Prophet"	2019	Cody Critcheloe
"Hit the Back" (dance video)	2019	Henry Metcalf and Mikaela Straus
"Hit the Back" (live performance)	2019	Josh Goleman
"If You Think It's Love" (live performance)	2019	Josh Goleman
"Homegirl" (live)	2019	Blythe Thomas and Grams
"Ohio"	2020	Cody Critcheloe
"Only Time Makes It Human"	2020	Quinn Wilson
"Pain"	2020	Quinn Wilson
"Little Bother" (live performance)	2022	Terrence O'Connor
"For My Friends"	2022	Nick Harwood
"Too Bad" / "Cursed"	2022	Quinn Wilson
"Let Us Die"	2022	Quinn Wilson

=== Guest appearances ===
Title	Year	Other artists	Album
"Run Me Through" (King Princess Remix)	2018	Perfume Genius	Reshaped EP
"Fell in Love with a Girl"	2019	—N/a	Triple J Like a Version 15

== Awards and nominations ==
In June 2020, in honor of the 50th anniversary of the first LGBTQ pride parade, Queerty named her among the fifty heroes "leading the nation toward equality, acceptance, and dignity for all people".

Year	Organization	Award	Work	Result
2018	BBC	Sound of 2019	Herself	Second
2018	DIY	Class of 2019	Herself	Included
2019	Rolling Stone Germany's; International Music Award	Beginner	Herself	Nominated
2020	GLAAD Media Award	Outstanding Music Artist	Cheap Queen	Nominated
