= Mia Yamamoto =

Japanese American attorney

Mia F Yamamoto
- Born: September 1943 (age 82–83); Arizona
- Occupation: Lawyer
- Partner: Kimberlee Tellez (m. 2015)
- Military career
- Allegiance: United States
- Branch: United States Army
- Service years: 1966-1968
- Conflicts: Vietnam War
- Awards: National Defense Service Medal; Army Commendation Medal

Mia F Yamamoto (born September 1943) is a Los Angeles-based criminal defense attorney and civil rights activist. Yamamoto is a transgender woman of Japanese American descent, born in the Poston War Relocation Center during World War II.

== Personal life ==
Yamamoto was born in September 1943. She was born in the Poston War Relocation Center during World War II due to her parents being forced into interment camps due to Executive Order 9066.

Yamamoto fought in the Vietnam War for two years, earning both the National Defense Service Medal and the Army Commendation Medal. Seeing similarities in the treatment of Vietnamese people to the abuses of Japanese Americans during World War II, Yamamoto became opposed to the war efforts.

After serving, Yamamoto attended UCLA's School of Law, where she co-founded the Asian Pacific Islander Law Student Association (APILSA). She married Kimberlee Tellez on September 2, 2015.

== Career ==
Yamamoto was appointed to serve on the California Judicial Council Task Forces on Jury Improvement and on Fairness and Access in the Courts by the Chief Justice of the California Supreme Court. Yamamoto served as President of the California Attorneys for Criminal Justice in 2001.

Yamamoto is the recipient of the Rainbow Key Award by the City of West Hollywood, the Liberty Award by Lambda Legal, and the Harvey Milk Legacy Award by Christopher Street West/LA Pride. She has also been honored by API Equality and the Los Angeles County Human Relations Commission for her advocacy on behalf of the LGBT community. She has received honors from the Criminal Courts Bar Association, National Lawyers Guild, and the Women Lawyers Association of Los Angeles.
