= Rule No. 9 =

Rule No. 9 (also simply Rule 9) was a city ordinance in Los Angeles, California, which made it illegal for performers to "impersonate by means of costume or dress a person of the opposite sex" without a special permit from the Los Angeles Board of Police Commissioners. Enforced in 1967, this outlawed cross-dressing and drag, and effectively criminalised transgender performers. It was notably used to prevent transgender dancer Sir Lady Java from performing.

== Background ==
In Los Angeles, cross-dressing and any form of public gender non-conformity had been outlawed since 1898 under Municipal Ordinance 5022. The Ordinance was amended in 1922 to allow a fine of $500 and 6 months in jail to be given to those in violation of the order. In 1940, the Board of Police Commissioners developed what would later become Rule No. 9 by requiring bar owners to get written permission from the Commission in order to host cross-dressing performers. The text of Rule No. 9 stated:

No entertainment shall be conducted in which any performer impersonates by means of costume or dress a person of the opposite sex, unless by special permit issued by the Board of Police Commissioners.

Performers had to be wearing at least three items of 'properly gendered' clothing to avoid violating the ordinance.

== Use against Sir Lady Java ==
Sir Lady Java was a transgender entertainer and go-go dancer who became famous for her impersonation of Lena Horne. In September 1967, she was set to begin performing at the Redd Foxx, (Note: Polk calls the club Redd's Place, but most other sources refer to it as the Redd Foxx Club.) a club on La Cienaga run by Redd Foxx. LAPD officers told the club's management to cancel Java's performance, invoking Rule No. 9, but it went ahead as scheduled. The police threatened to arrest the owner or revoke the bar's liquor license if she was allowed to perform again. The club applied for a permit in October 1967 but was refused.

Java picketed the club, arguing the ordinance violated her right to work and challenged it in court with the ACLU. At the time, California's anti-masquerading law had already been declared unconstitutional, meaning that the acts Rule No. 9 prevented from being on stage were legal on the streets.

The courts ruled that only club or bar owners could sue the police department, but Java and the ACLU could not find anyone willing to join the suit. Rule No. 9 was struck down as part of a decision by the California Supreme Court in 1969 where a different cabaret law was challenged and defeated.

== See also ==
- History of cross-dressing
- LGBT history in California
