= Sir Lady Java =

American transgender rights activist and entertainer (1942–2024)

- Sir Lady Java, circa 1970
- Born: August 20, 1942; New Orleans, Louisiana, U.S.
- Died: November 16, 2024 (aged 82); Los Angeles, California, U.S.
- Other name: Lady Java
- Occupations: Drag queen, actress, exotic dancer, comedian, actress
- Years active: 1960s–1970s

Sir Lady Java (August 20, 1942 – November 16, 2024), also known simply as Lady Java, was an American transgender rights activist, exotic dancer, singer, comedian, and actress. Active on stage, television, radio and film from the mid-1960s to 1970s, she was a popular and influential personality in the Los Angeles-area African-American LGBTQ community.

== Biography ==
=== Early life ===
Born in New Orleans, Louisiana, on August 20, 1942, Java transitioned at a young age with the support of her mother, and began singing and dancing in local nightclubs.

=== Career and legal battle ===
Sir Lady moved to Los Angeles, California, where in the mid-1960s she met and befriended Little Richard; they remained close for decades. By 1965, she had become a mainstay of the nightclub circuit, where she was associated with such figures as Redd Foxx, Sammy Davis Jr., Richard Pryor, Flip Wilson, Rudy Ray Moore, LaWanda Page, and Don Rickles. Lady Java cited Lena Horne, Mae West, and Josephine Baker as inspirations for her performances, which involved dancing, impersonations, singing, and comedy. She was frequently featured in such magazines as Jet, HEP, the LA Advocate, and Variety.

In the early fall of 1967, after a successful two-week engagement at Redd Foxx's club which Java was seeking to extend, the Los Angeles Police Department began shutting down the now-famous Java's performances, citing Rule Number 9, a local ordinance prohibiting the "impersonation by means of costume or dress a person of the opposite sex", and threatening to fine clubs that hosted her. In response, Java picketed Redd Foxx's club on October 21 and partnered with the American Civil Liberties Union in a bid to overturn the rule. The court rejected Java's case with the ACLU, stipulating that only club owners could sue. Rule Number 9 ultimately was struck down after a separate dispute in 1969.

In 1978, Java performed with Lena Horne at a birthday party for nightclub owner and columnist Gertrude Gipson.

=== Later years ===
From the 1980s, Java kept a lower public profile. After retiring from performance and recovering from a stroke, she made a limited return to public life, appearing locally in southern California and giving interviews. In June 2016, she was a guest of honor at the 18th annual Trans Pride L.A. festival alongside CeCe McDonald. Java also participated in the 2022 Los Angeles Pride Parade as Community Grand Marshal. Java has been recognized as a trailblazer.

=== Death ===
Java died in Los Angeles on the evening of November 16, 2024, at the age of 82.

== Filmography ==
Year	Film	Role	Notes
1976	The Human Tornado	Self	In 1976, Java portrayed herself in the Dolemite sequel The Human Tornado.

== Awards and honors ==
- 1971 – Guest of honor, Alpha Chapter (Los Angeles) of the Full Personality Expression
- 2016 – Guest of honor, 18th Annual Trans Pride L.A.
