= Rule of nine (linguistics) =

The rule of nine (Ukrainian: Правило дев'ятки) is a orthographic rule of the Ukrainian language, which prohibits writing the letter "i" in loanwords after nine consonants (д, т, з, с, ц, ж, ш, ч, and р) if the next letter is a consonant (except for "й"). For example, the loanwords сигнал, динамо, режим, дизель, зиґзаґ, and принтер are written with the letter "и", rather than writing сігнал, дінамо, режім, дізель, зіґзаґ, and прінтер.

However, if the "i" in a loanword is followed by a vowel, then the rule of nine does not apply. For example, the loanwords діадема, діоптрія, тіофен, станція, адажіо, and Чіо-чіо-сан are written with the letter "i". Additionally, the letter "i" is used after these nine consonants if it appears at the end of an uninflected loanword, such as колібрі, парі, фрі, and таксі, though таксист is an exception to this rule.

The current Ukrainian spelling lists the following exception to the rule of nine:

З «и», а не з «і» пишуться також слова церковного вжитку: диякон, єпископ, єпитимія, єпитрахиль, камилавка, митра, митрополит, християнство тощо.
Words of ecclesiastical use are also written with "и" rather than "і": диякон, єпископ, єпитимія, єпитрахиль, камилавка, митра, митрополит, християнство, and so on.

However, the 1999 Orthographic Dictionary of the Ukrainian language does not include this exception for church-related loanwords, such as архієпископ (archbishop), архієрей (bishop), архімандрит (archimandrite), клір (clergy), клірик (cleric).

Furthermore, loanwords assimilated into the Ukrainian language are often written according to their pronunciation, rather than necessarily following the rule of nine, such as бурмистер (but бургомістр), вимпел, єхидна, імбир, кипарис, and лиман.

== History ==
The rule of nine for spelling words of foreign language origin was first formulated in 1913 by the authors of the grammar of the Ruthenian language, Stepan Smal-Stotsky and Theodor Gartner, modeled on a similar rule for the Polish language.

The 1993 edition of the Ukrainian Spelling Book, which resembles previous editions and is still in force, extended the rule of nine to the proper names of foreign locations, such as Argentina, Chile, and Syria. The 1993 edition also extended the rule of nine to the words бравісимо, фортисимо, and піанісимо.

== Bibliography ==
- Український правопис. § 90 (in Ukrainian)
- «Дев'ятки» правило / Енциклопедія «Українська мова». — К., 2000. — С. 123. (in Ukrainian)
- Олена Гузар. Правописний стандарт української мови: історія та реалії. Вісник Львів. університету. Серія філол. 2004. Вип. 34. Ч.ІІ. С.501-506 (in Ukrainian)
- Вік живи, вік перевчайся — неграмотним умреш. Олекса Негребецький «Україна молода» 2001.01.25 (in Ukrainian)
- Проєкт Правопису 1999 р. (in Ukrainian)
- Літери и та і в іншомовних загальних назвах. Термінологічно-правописний порадник для богословів та редакторів богословських текстів (in Ukrainian)
