= Michaela Mendelsohn =

Michaela Ivri Mendelsohn is the founder of TransCanWork, which connects trans job seekers to businesses that will welcome them.

Mendelsohn worked extensively towards the development of Laverne Cox's character in Orange is the New Black. Mendelsohn is the CEO of various El Pollo Loco restaurants on the west coast. As an LGBTQ activist, she services on the board of directors at the Trevor Project, and was featured on the cover of the Los Angeles LGBTQ Vanguard Magazine. She was the first transgender contestant in the Ms. Senior California Pageant. Due to her work, she was named the grand marshal of 2018 Los Angeles Pride.
