= Let Us Die (film) =

Documentary film

- Directed by: Jason Whitely; Taylor Lumsden
- Written by: Jason Whitely
- Produced by: Jason Whitely; Taylor Lumsden; Timothy A. Mallad
- Starring: Jane Seymour; Timothy A. Mallad; Frank Pringham
- Narrated by: Kathi Stock (voice of Olga Holzapfel)
- Release date: 2022

Let Us Die is a 2022 documentary film based on letters found hidden inside an antique desk as a German family contemplates suicide during World War II rather than enduring repeated atrocities committed by Russian soldiers. The film, directed by WFAA reporter Jason Whitely, premiered at the Dallas International Film Festival in October 2022.

The documentary was inspired by a collection of old letters discovered by Dallas nonprofit executive Tim Mallad, who, as a young man, found them hidden inside a secret compartment of an antique desk that he purchased for $25 at an estate sale.

The letters detail the decision by 13-year-old Ursula Weiss, who lived with her parents in Neustrelitz, Germany, to die by suicide rather than let soldiers rape her again in the closing days of World War II. The family's last conversation, preserved word-for-word in the letters, recounts Ursula begging her father to enact their suicide-by-cyanide pact before Soviet soldiers could return to sexually abuse her again.

Mallad was encouraged to share the story behind the letters by actress Jane Seymour, who appears in the documentary.

== Awards ==
Let Us Die received a 2024 Lone Star EMMY Award in the Documentary category from the National Academy of Television Arts & Sciences Lone Star Chapter.

In 2024, Let Us Die received a regional Edward R. Murrow Award from the Radio Television Digital News Association.

Let Us Die received the 2023 Silver Award for Storytelling from the Headliners Foundation in Austin, Texas.
