= 1950 (song) =

2018 debut single by King Princess

Single by King Princess

from the EP Make My Bed
- Released: February 23, 2018
- Recorded: 2017
- Genre: Electropop
- Length: 3:27
- Label: Columbia; Zelig
- Songwriters: Mikaela Straus; Nick Long
- Producers: King Princess; Mike Malchicoff

King Princess singles chronology
"1950" (2018)	"Talia" (2018)

Music video
- "1950" on YouTube

"1950" is the debut single recorded by American singer-songwriter King Princess. It was released on February 23, 2018, by Zelig Recordings as the lead single from her debut EP, titled Make My Bed. "1950" is a tribute to the 1952 novel The Price of Salt by Patricia Highsmith. The song was performed on The Late Show with Stephen Colbert and Saturday Night Live on November 8 and November 23, 2019, alongside her other single "Hit the Back".

== Music video ==
The music video and the single were both released on February 23, 2018. The video was directed by Clare Gillen. As of July 2023, it has over 21 million views on YouTube.

== Personnel ==
Credits adapted from Tidal.

- King Princess – vocals, songwriting, production, programming, bass
- Mike Malchicoff – production
- Nick Long – songwriting
- Dave Kutch – mastering engineer
- Mike Malchicoff – recording engineer, mixing engineer
- Tommy Brenneck – mixing engineer

== Charts ==
Chart performance for "1950"
Chart (2018)	Peak position
Australia (ARIA)	25
Austria (Ö3 Austria Top 40)	75
Belgium (Ultratop 50 Flanders)	48
Canada Hot 100 (Billboard)	82
Netherlands (Single Top 100)	83
Sweden (Sverigetopplistan)	87
Switzerland (Schweizer Hitparade)	94
US Adult Alternative Airplay (Billboard)	25
US Alternative Airplay (Billboard)	22
US Rock & Alternative Airplay (Billboard)	29

== Certifications ==
Certifications for "1950"
Region	Certification	Certified units/sales
Australia (ARIA)	Gold	35,000^{‡}
Canada (Music Canada)	2× Platinum	160,000^{‡}
Denmark (IFPI Danmark)	Gold	45,000^{‡}
New Zealand (RMNZ)	2× Platinum	60,000^{‡}
United Kingdom (BPI)	Gold	400,000^{‡}
United States (RIAA)	Platinum	1,000,000^{‡}
^{‡} Sales+streaming figures based on certification alone.

== Release history ==
Release dates and formats for "1950"
Region	Date	Format	Label
Various	February 23, 2018	Digital download; streaming	Zelig; Columbia

== In other media ==
The 2020 Academy Award-winning animated short If Anything Happens I Love You featured the song.
