= Only Time Makes It Human =

2020 single by King Princess

Single by King Princess
- Released: October 16, 2020
- Genre: Dance-pop; new wave
- Length: 3:24
- Label: Zelig
- Songwriters: Mikaela Straus; Nick Long
- Producers: King Princess; Mike Malchikoff

King Princess singles chronology
"Ohio" (2020)	"Only Time Makes It Human" (2020)	"Pain" (2020)

Music video
- "Only Time Makes It Human" on YouTube

"Only Time Makes It Human" is a song by American singer-songwriter King Princess, released on October 16, 2020. The song sees Straus delving into the dance-pop genre, and described as "a 21st century take on Kylie Minogue's '00s club mainstay "Can't Get You Out of My Head". It is a break-up song about unrequited love and the "healing power of time". The song's official music video features Straus as a "crying 3D avatar of herself" that Billboard called "trippy" and "far from anything you would have expected from her."

== Critical reception ==
"Only Time Makes It Human" was included on Billboard's list of the best LGBTQ songs of 2020.

== Music video ==
The music video and the single were both released on October 16, 2020. The video was directed by Quinn Wilson. As of December 2023, it has over 1 million views on YouTube.

== Track listing ==
Digital download

1. "Only Time Makes It Human" – 3:24

Digital download – remix EP

1. "Only Time Makes It Human" (Kitty Cash remix) – 3:08
2. "Only Time Makes It Human" (Yoseppi remix) – 3:42
3. "Only Time Makes It Human" (The Blessed Madonna remix) – 3:43

== Personnel ==
Credits adapted from Tidal.

- King Princess – lead and background vocals, songwriting, production, guitar, synthesizer
- Nick Long – songwriting
- Mike Malchicoff – production, synthesizer, recording engineer
- Mark Ronson – co-production, guitar, recording engineer
- Jonah Feingold – guitar
- Chris Athens – mastering engineer
- Josh Gudwin – mixing engineer
- "Diamond" Dave Huffman – assistant engineer

== Charts ==
Chart (2020)	Peak position
New Zealand Hot Singles (RMNZ)	33
