= Gertrude Gipson =

African-American civil rights activist

- Born: Gertrude Estelle Lomax; July 5, 1923; Ocean City, New Jersey
- Died: May 25, 1999; Los Angeles, California
- Education: Los Angeles City College
- Occupation(s): Columnist, editor, radio host, civil rights activist, nightclub owner
- Years active: 1950s–1999
- Children: Revė Gipson, Shontė Gertrude Penland
- Website: www.regalettes.org

Gertrude Gipson Penland was an African-American syndicated columnist, editor, nightclub owner, publicist, and civil rights activist.

== Early life ==
Born Gertrude Estelle Lomax in Ocean City, New Jersey, in July, 1923, a Cancerian, she moved to Los Angeles as a child. Not much is known about Gipson's early years as she kept her birth date and age secret. She attended Los Angeles City College.

== Career ==
After graduating college, she married journalist J.T. Gipson and started work as a columnist and entertainment editor for the California Eagle, one of the earliest African-American newspapers. She achieved more success in the same position afterwards, at the Los Angeles Sentinel, where she remained for more than 30 years. Gipson's Hollywood column, Gertrude Gipson’s Candid Comments, was widely syndicated, featuring in around 120 African-American newspapers. She also contributed to the Pittsburgh Courier and Sepia Magazine.

In 1958, Gipson founded a social club and charity organization called the Regalettes.

From the 1950s to the 70s, she owned a nightclub in Los Angeles, initially co-owning with her husband Elledge Penland. She worked and associated with performers such as Richard Pryor, Sir Lady Java, Lena Horne, Little Richard, Sam Cooke, and Bill Cosby. Elledge Penland died in 1968.

Later, Gipson was appointed to the California Motion Picture Development Council by Governor Jerry Brown, a first for an African-American woman, also serving on the Los Angeles Film Advisory Commission. Gipson also had a daily talk show covering civil rights and work opportunities in Hollywood.

Gipson's 1978 birthday party, attended by many celebrities including Sir Lady Java and Lena Horne, was featured in Jet.

== Death ==
Gipson died of pneumonia in Los Angeles on May 25, 1999. Her funeral was attended by many celebrities and politicians, including Los Angeles County District Attorney Gil Garcetti, L.A. County Supervisor Yvonne Brathwaite Burke, Representative Maxine Waters, City Attorney James Hahn, Diane Watson, Barbara Boudreaux, actors Sidney Poitier and Marla Gibbs, and singers Nancy Wilson, Lou Rawls, Linda Hopkins, Ernie Andrews, Howard Hewett, and Frankie Beverly.

She is survived by a brother, Randolph Lomax, and her daughters Revė Gipson and Shontė Penland. Gipson's final resting place is Inglewood Park Cemetery in Inglewood, California.

== Honors and awards ==
- 1980 Image Award, NAACP
- Best Entertainment Section, National Newspaper Publishers Association
- 1985 Woman of the Year, National Association of Media Women
- Women for Good Government Award
- Los Angeles Delta Sigma Theta sorority Award
- Sugar Ray Robinson Foundation Youth Award
