= Vera Jackson =

American photographer (1911–1999)

Vera Ruth Jackson
- Born: July 21, 1911; Wichita, Kansas
- Died: January 25, 1999 (aged 86); Corona, California, U.S.
- Education: California State University, Los Angeles; University of Southern California
- Occupations: Photographer, Teacher
- Spouse(s): Vernon D. Jackson (1907–1983), m. 1931
- Children: 2 sons, Kerry and Kendall

Vera Jackson (July 21, 1911 – January 25, 1999) was a "pioneer woman photographer in the black press". She photographed African-American social life and celebrity culture in 1930s and 1940s Los Angeles. Noted photographic subjects included major league baseball player Jackie Robinson, educator Mary McLeod Bethune, and actresses Dorothy Dandridge, Hattie McDaniel and Lena Horne.

== Biography ==
Vera Jackson was born Otis Theda Ruth in Wichita, Kansas on July 21, 1911, and was raised in Corona, California. She graduated from Corona High School in 1930, and married Vernon Jackson in 1931.

Jackson was a freelance photographer with the California Eagle. Editor Charlotta Bass later hired her as a staff photographer and often paired her to work with society editor Jessie Mae Brown (later Jessie Brown Beavers) until Brown left for the Los Angeles Sentinel.

When Jackson left the California Eagle, she earned her B.A. in 1952 from Los Angeles State College and her master's degree in 1954 from the University of Southern California in education. She became a Los Angeles Unified School District teacher and retired in 1976 after 25 years of teaching.

During her teaching career, Jackson continued with freelance photography. Her work has been exhibited at the UCLA Gallery, the Riverside Art Museum, the Black Gallery of Los Angeles, and the National Museum of Women in the Arts, as well as the Los Angeles Country Public Library, the Afro-American Museum of History and Culture in Los Angeles and the Museum of Art in San Francisco.

Jackson died on January 25, 1999, at the age of 88.

== Exhibitions ==
Year	Title	Location	Notes
2000	The Great Migration: The Evolution of African American Art, 1790-1945	Taft Museum of Art, Cincinnati, OH	Forty-nine pieces in group exhibition including works by Vera Jackson, Mary Edmonia Lewis, Geneva Higgins McGee, James Presley Ball Jr., Edward Bannister, Romare Bearden, Eldzier Cortor, Jacob Lawrence, Hughie Lee-Smith, Norman Lewis, Gordon Parks, Marion Perkins, Elijah Pierce, Horace Pippin, Henry Ossawa Tanner, Dox Thrash, and James Van Der Zee. 25-page catalog.
1997	A History of Women Photographers	Sites included the Stephen Schwartzman Gallery, New York Public Library, Akron Art Museum, Santa Barbara Art Museum, National Museum of Women in the Arts, Washington DC.	First large-scale exhibition featuring women's achievements in photography. Works from 219 women photographers. Vera Jackson's photograph features a 1948 civil rights protest.
1983	The Tradition Continues: California Black Photographers	California African American Museum (as Museum of Afro-American History and Culture), Los Angeles, CA.	Exhibit featured works by Vera Jackson, Harry Adams, Fred Cooper, Jack Davis, Bill Doggett, Gil Garner, and Howard Lee Morehead. 38-page catalog with text by Lonnie G. Bunche and Roland Charles.

== Collections ==
- Akron Art Museum A Vera Jackson photograph was also included in an Akron Art Museum exhibit A History of Women Photographers.
- Charlotta Bass & California Eagle Photograph Collection, 1870–1960, USC
- Vera Jackson Archive, Tom and Ethel Bradley Center, California State University, Northridge
