= Leon H. Washington Jr. =

American newspaper publisher

- Born: April 15, 1907; Kansas City, Kansas, U.S.
- Died: June 17, 1974 (aged 67); Pasadena, California, U.S.
- Education: Washburn University
- Occupation: Publisher
- Spouse: Ruth Brumell

Leon H. Washington Jr. (April 15, 1907 – June 17, 1974) was an American newspaper publisher. He was the founder and first publisher of the Los Angeles Sentinel, an African-American newspaper in Los Angeles, California.

== Early life ==
Born in Kansas City, Kansas on April 15, 1907, to Leon and Blanche Washington, Leon H. Washington Jr. was the only son of three children, alongside his sisters Juanita and Barbara Washington. Leon became an iconic figure in the African American fight for equality in the twentieth century through his Los Angeles-based newspaper, The Sentinel. Washington attended Summer High School from 1921 to 1925 before attending Washburn University in Topeka, Kansas. After graduating from Washburn, Washington began his first job as an independent clothes salesman.

Civil rights attorney and cousin of Washington, Loren Miller urged him to move to Los Angeles where he practiced and resided. In 1930, Leon Washington moved to Los Angeles, California from Kansas City, Kansas. Miller connected him with Charlotta Bass, the editor and owner of the California Eagle, the longest-running and most circulated and successful African American newspaper in California at the time. Washington's cousin, Miller, also owned the California Eagle briefly. Washington spent three years working for the California Eagle before leaving to begin his own newspaper.

== Personal life ==
In 1940, Washington married one of the Sentinel’s photographers, Ruth Brumell. After almost a decade of marriage, he began to experience numerous health problems and eventually had a stroke, leaving him incapable of performing his job alone. Following his health problems, Washington looked to his wife to help manage his duties in the paper business and promoted her to the assistant publisher and business manager of the Sentinel. The duo worked diligently together for the remaining years of Washington's life until he died on June 17, 1974, at the age of 67. The widowed Ruth carried on the legacy of her husband for almost 17 years after her husband's death, serving as the editor and publisher of the paper.

Today, the city of Los Angeles celebrates the life of Leon H. Washington through the dedication of a Los Angeles Public Library branch in his name as well as a Los Angeles County park. The park, located almost ten miles from The Sentinel’s headquarters, is home to The Drew League, a program that is known for attracting the NBA's best players such as Lebron James, Kobe Bryant, Kevin Durant, Shannon Brown, Amar’e Stoudamire, James Harden, Matt Barnes, and Trevor Ariza who come by the park to spend time with and enrich their communities, a goal to which Leon Washington dedicated his own life. His dedication is shown through the continuation of The Sentinel today, which now boasts a readership of over 125,000.

== Career ==
In 1930 Washington moved to Los Angeles, California by recommendation of his cousin, civil rights attorney Loren Miller, who referred Washington to editor-owner of The California Eagle. At the time, The California Eagle was the longest-running and most circulated newspaper in the state. Washington became one of the newspaper's advertising salesmen. Three years later, Washington left this position and started The Eastside Shopper, his first newspaper. This free circulation newspaper was most popular in Los Angeles's Central Avenue district. After a year of publication, the paper's circulation had then reached the point where Washington could afford to change the name to the Los Angeles Sentinel and become subscription-based. The Sentinel would quickly grow to rival The California Eagle.

Washington directed the newspaper and its content toward African American communities in this area. Within a year, the newspaper became successful enough for Washington to afford to change the title to the Los Angeles Sentinel. Along with the name change, the paper became a subscription-based publication. In 1972, the newspaper reached its highest circulation peak at 39,277 people with 50 employees in The Sentinel headquarters, which moved from the corner of Central Avenue and E. 43rd Street in Los Angeles to Crenshaw Boulevard in Los Angeles. Friends of Washington highlighted the authenticity of his articles and the newspaper as a whole, noting the prominence of his personality in each edition. One friend shared that Washington, “epitomized ‘personalized’ journalism.” Today, the Sentinel is the largest, most popular black newspaper in the West.

Washington used the Sentinel to advocate for economic reform as a way to reduce inequality in the United States. He encouraged his African American audience to become entrepreneurs just as he had, to venture out and find the success he had found. Washington advertised the idea of peaceful protests and nonviolent demonstrations to fight discrimination in his newspaper. Washington used The Sentinel as a “potent vehicle to gain respect for the Black community from the larger society.” He details a series of peaceful protests against white shop owners operating in Black communities refusing to hire Black workers in which he brings back the 1930s boycott slogan, “Don’t Spend Your Money Where You Can’t Work.” Amidst one peaceful demonstration turned wrong, Washington was wrongly arrested and jailed by the Los Angeles Police Department, which only gained him more admiration from the Black community. His leadership during and dedication to this campaign earned him the title “Colonel '' from Kentucky Governor Bert Combs. Washington also went on to become the first African American to serve on the Board of Directors of the California News Publisher's Association.

Washington continued to work as the publisher for the paper until he died in 1974. During his tenure, the Sentinel saw a peak circulation of 39,277 and Washington had built a staff of 50. Upon his death, his widow, Ruth, took over in his position and worked the job until she also died in 1990.
