= Calvin Hicks (photographer) =

African-American photographer (1941–2012)

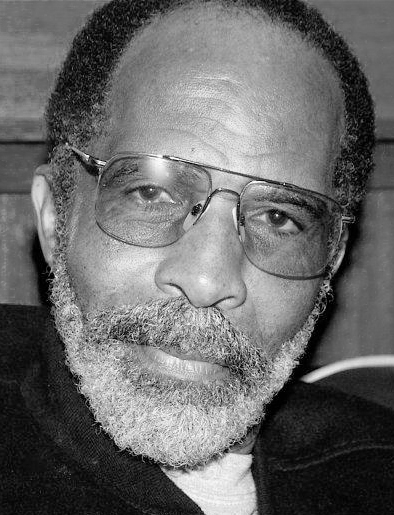
- Born: Clavin Robert Hicks; March 19, 1941; Mount Carbon, West Virginia, U.S.
- Died: May 20, 2012 (aged 71); Los Angeles, California, U.S.
- Education: West Virginia State College
- Known for: Photography
- Notable work: Figure Study #3 (Nude), 1974
- Spouses: Linda McCormick (m. 1965) Joyce Elaine (m. 2006–2012)
- Children: Daughters Sheli and Elizabeth

Calvin Robert Hicks (1941–2012) was an African American photographer and gallerist, best known for founding The Black Photographers of California and its associated exhibition space, the Black Gallery, in Los Angeles, as well as for his classical nude portraiture from the 1970s.

== Early life ==
Calvin Hicks was born to a coal mining family in Mount Carbon, West Virginia, in 1941. He attended school in West Virginia through college when he earned a degree in art education from West Virginia State College in 1965.

After college, Hicks worked as an art teacher at Herbert Hoover High School until 1968, when he, his wife, and their two daughters moved to Los Angeles, where Hicks worked as a county parole officer for forty years.

== Photographic career ==
Hicks had been a photographer since he received his first camera, a box camera, in elementary school, and in Los Angeles, he continued to take photos and paint. He also continued to study art at the Inner City Cultural Center, the Los Angeles Trade-Technical College, and from 1984 to 1986, the Otis Art Institute.

Hicks was also a member of the Bunker Hill Arts League, along with friends Donald Bernard and Willie Middlebrook, and from 1980–1984 he exhibited his work there. Together with Bernard and Middlebrook, as well as Donald Anton and Andy Garcia, Hicks started several gallery spaces in Los Angeles in the 1980s, including the Visionist Gallery and a combined darkroom and studio space in Inglewood, California.

Hicks’ collected work consists of fine art photography, natural compositions, and several long-running bodies of work depicting public spaces and events in Los Angeles, especially Venice Beach and community events like the Central Avenue Jazz Festival.

The Calvin Hicks Collection consists of over 2,800 images and is housed at the Tom & Ethel Bradley Center in the University Library at California State University, Northridge.

== The Black Gallery ==
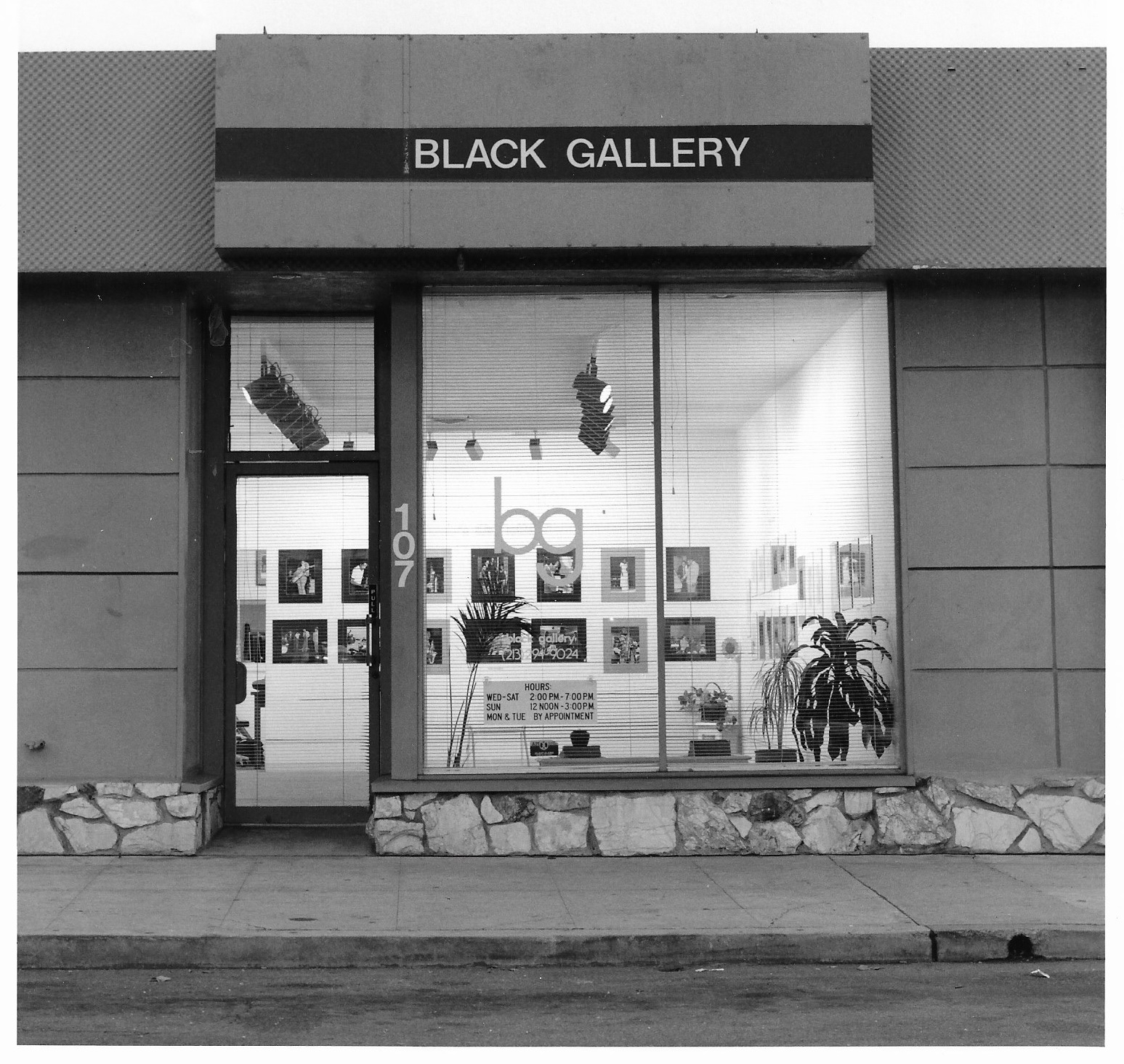
The Black Gallery (1984–1998), dedicated exhibition space for African American photographers, located at 107 Santa Barbara Plaza, Los Angeles, CA.

In 1984, after struggling to find spaces willing to exhibit black artists, Hicks co-founded the Black Photographers of California, a nonprofit educational institution for emerging and established African American Photographers. Sponsored by that organization, Hicks and co-founders Roland Charles, Donald Bernard, and Gil Garner started the Black Gallery in Santa Barbara Plaza, now Marlton Square. Supported by grants and donations, the gallery curated and encouraged black photographers. Hicks stated that the Black Gallery was "the first gallery in the black community dedicated to black photography."

The gallery served as an incubator for black photographers, offering workshops and slide sharing, as well as a meeting place and coffee house for other events. Hicks and his co-founders were part of a burgeoning group of black gallerists in Los Angeles, like brothers Dale and Alonzo Davis of Brockman Gallery, credited with the first significant gallery run by and for black artists.

After the Black Gallery closed in 1998, its archives, including over 1,500 of Hicks’ photographs, were donated to the Tom & Ethel Bradley Center at the University Library at California State University, Northridge.

== Selected exhibitions ==
Hicks’ photographs were included in several local and national exhibitions.

- Five Photographers, a group show with Hicks, Donald Bernard, Ronald Corbin, Gilbert Fernandez and Monticello Miller, sponsored by the Bunker Hills Art League at the Ennis Brown House in Hollywood, California, on 16 May 1983.
- Olympic Pretensions, a group show with Hicks, Donald Bernard, Valena Dismukes, Gil Garner, Bernadette Gibson, and Willie Middlebrook at the Los Angeles Photography Center, August - September 1984.
- The Legacy Continues: Black Photographers, at the City Hall Bridge Gallery in Los Angeles, February 1986. Featured works by Los Angeles area photographers Hicks, Jack Davis, James Jeffrey, David Healey, David Leonard Perry, and Harry Adams.
- Roe Anne White, Calvin Hicks: Venice Visuals — People and Paradox, at the Black Gallery in Los Angeles, April 1987.
- A Day in the Life of Black Los Angeles, a show of 120 photographs taken on Martin Luther King Day in 1988, at the Museum of African-American Art in Los Angeles, February 1988, and thereafter at the Black Gallery in Los Angeles. The exhibit also traveled to the Black-Art Gallery, London, England, July 12 - Aug 10, 1990.
- Life in a Day of Black L.A., a traveling companion exhibit to the book, which began at the UCLA Extension Design Center in Santa Monica, CA on December 6, 1992, then moving to the California African-American Museum in April, 1993, before continuing on a nationwide tour.
- Nudes: Classic & Conceptual, a group show at the Black Gallery, Los Angeles, September–October 1989. Featured photographers included Hicks, James Jeffrey, Diana Edwardson, Sandra Ramirez, Roland Charles and Willie Middlebrook.
- Contemporary African American Photography, a group exhibit curated by Willie Middlebrook at the Los Angeles Photography Center, 9 January - 25 February 1990.
- A multimedia collaboration with poet Saundra Sharp at the Barnsdall Park Gallery Theater in Los Angeles, on 11 July 1991.
- Black Photographers, a group show at Cal State University Fine Arts Gallery in Los Angeles, 1–23 February 1998. Works by Hicks, Darius Anthony, Nathanial Bellamy, Bob Douglas, Ron Wilkins and others were featured.
- Identity & Affirmation: Post-War African-American Photography, an exhibit at California State University, Northridge, as part of the Pacific Standard Time: Art in L.A., 1945–1980, 23 October 23–10 December 2011. Photographers featured in the exhibit included Hicks, Roland Charles, Guy Crowder, Jack Davis, Bob Douglas, Joe Flowers, Maxie Floyd, Bob Moore, and Charles Williams.

== Selected bibliography ==
Hicks’ photographs were published in several books, including:

- Willis, Deborah (1989), An illustrated bio-bibliography of Black photographers, 1940-1988, Garland, OCLC 1008051617
- Sharp, Saundra Pearl (1991), Typing in the Dark, Harlem River Press, OCLC 24328361 The cover photograph features one of Calvin Hicks' nudes, Figure Study #3, 1974. Other photographs are by Adelle Hodge, Nathaniel Bellamy and Gerald Cyrus.
- Charles, Roland; Igus, Toyomi (1992), Life in a day of Black L.A: the way we see it: L.A.'s Black photographers present a new perspective on their city., University of California, Los Angeles. Center for Afro-American Studies, ISBN 9780934934398, OCLC 1001920718 Photographers featured in this book included Cedric Adams, Nathaniel Bellamy, Roland Charles, Don Cropper, Calvin Hicks, James Jeffries, Mike Jones, Rod Lyons, Willie Middlebrook, Akili Casundria Ramsess, and Karen Kennedy.
- Willis, Deborah (2000), Reflections in Black: A History of Black Photographers, 1840 to the Present, W.W. Norton, ISBN 9780393322804, OCLC 248504242

== Death ==
Hicks passed from complications of cancer on May 20, 2012. He died fifteen days after the passing of fellow friend and photographer Willie Middlebrook. Hicks' final instructions was for family and friends to celebrate his life with "some Miles, Monk, Mozart, and a glass of wine."
