= Roland Charles =

African-American photographer (1938–2000)

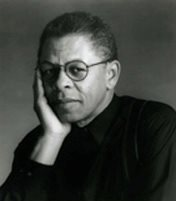
- Roland Charles in the office of The Black Gallery, Los Angeles CA
- Born: August 31, 1938; New Orleans, Louisiana, U.S.
- Died: May 26, 2000 (aged 61); Los Angeles, California, U.S.
- Known for: Photography
- Notable work: The Shine Man (1968), Railroad Tracks (1974), Rosa Parks in Los Angeles (1983), Brixton Station, London (1993)
- Spouse: deBorah Charles
- Children: Daughter, Roshawn Hawley

Roland Charles (August 31, 1938 – May 26, 2000) was an African-American photographer and gallerist, best known for co-founding The Black Photographers of California and its associated exhibition space, the Black Gallery, in Los Angeles, among the first institutions by and for black photographers.

== Early life and education ==
Roland Charles was born in Louisiana in 1938. He moved to a community known as Bobtown (near Houma, Louisiana) as a child, and lived there until he graduated from high school. He served in the Air Force, and then moved to California in the early 1960s, where he worked in the aerospace industry. After a friend gave him a camera as a gift, he became a full-time freelance photographer in 1971, securing work on music album covers and with gossip reporter Rona Barrett.

Charles earned a bachelor's degree in Communications from Windsor University and studied television production and photography at Otis College of Art and Design, Los Angeles Trade-Technical College, and the University of Southern California.

== Photographic career ==
In November 1983, Charles organized a show at the California Museum of Afro-American History and Culture in Exposition Park, called The Tradition Continues: California Black Photographers. It was a major exhibit featuring seven pioneering California photographers and 40 contemporary ones, including Frank Herman Cloud, Vera Jackson, Harry Adams, Jack Davis, Fred Cooper, and Howard Morehead.

As a gallerist and photographer, Charles had an appreciation for the mix of utilitarian and fine art photography produced by many black photographers of his era, such as the newspaper photography of prolific black press photographer Harry Adams, whom Charles was acquainted with.

Charles also expressed appreciation for the fundamental craft of photography — in discussing a double-exposed photograph of his daughter dancing in the Los Angeles Times, he said, “when I think of this photograph, I think of poetry in motion.”

In 1988, Roland Charles and Thomas L. Wright curated a show at the Museum of African American Art in Los Angeles called A Day in the Life of Black Los Angeles, which displayed 120 photographs taken by black photographers on Martin Luther King Day of that year. After the success of this exhibit, Charles embarked on a book project, Life in a Day of Black L.A., which would feature commissioned photographs from ten local black photographers. The project would, he hoped, "fill the void in the projection of black culture."

In 1992, to coincide with the release of the book, Charles organized an exhibit called Life in a Day of Black Los Angeles: The Way We See It. The images, displayed at the Museum of African-American Art and then as a traveling exhibit, were intended to show black life across the spectrum of black social experience, and specifically sought to address what Charles and co-editor Toyomi Igus described as the misrepresentation of black culture in the media. The images in the show drew from communities across Los Angeles county, including Pasadena, Watts, and Beverly Hills.

As Charles was finalizing the book, the Los Angeles Riots occurred, and the project was amended to include numerous images from that event and its aftermath. “We were right in the book’s final selection process when the ‘epilogue’ happened,” Charles told the L.A. Times.

Following the Los Angeles Riots, Charles was active as both a photographer and curator in a number of events and retrospective exhibitions about the event. His photograph "Going to the Dogs" was called “the most powerful image” in the first major show after the event, at the Louis Stern Galleries in Beverly Hills.

Charles' dedication to a fair depiction of black life could be seen in his participation in the controversy around the Whitney Museum’s 1995 show, “Black Male: Representations of Masculinity in Contemporary American Art.” The show spurred a series of counter-exhibits called “African American Representations of Masculinity,” led by a group of black artists in Los Angeles including Charles. Interviewed by LA Weekly, Charles said that he hoped to humanize black men and dispel fear with his images, and said: "Since Birth of a Nation, we’ve had an image problem."

Charles' work was included in the 2025 exhibition Photography and the Black Arts Movement, 1955–1985 at the National Gallery of Art.

== The Black Gallery ==
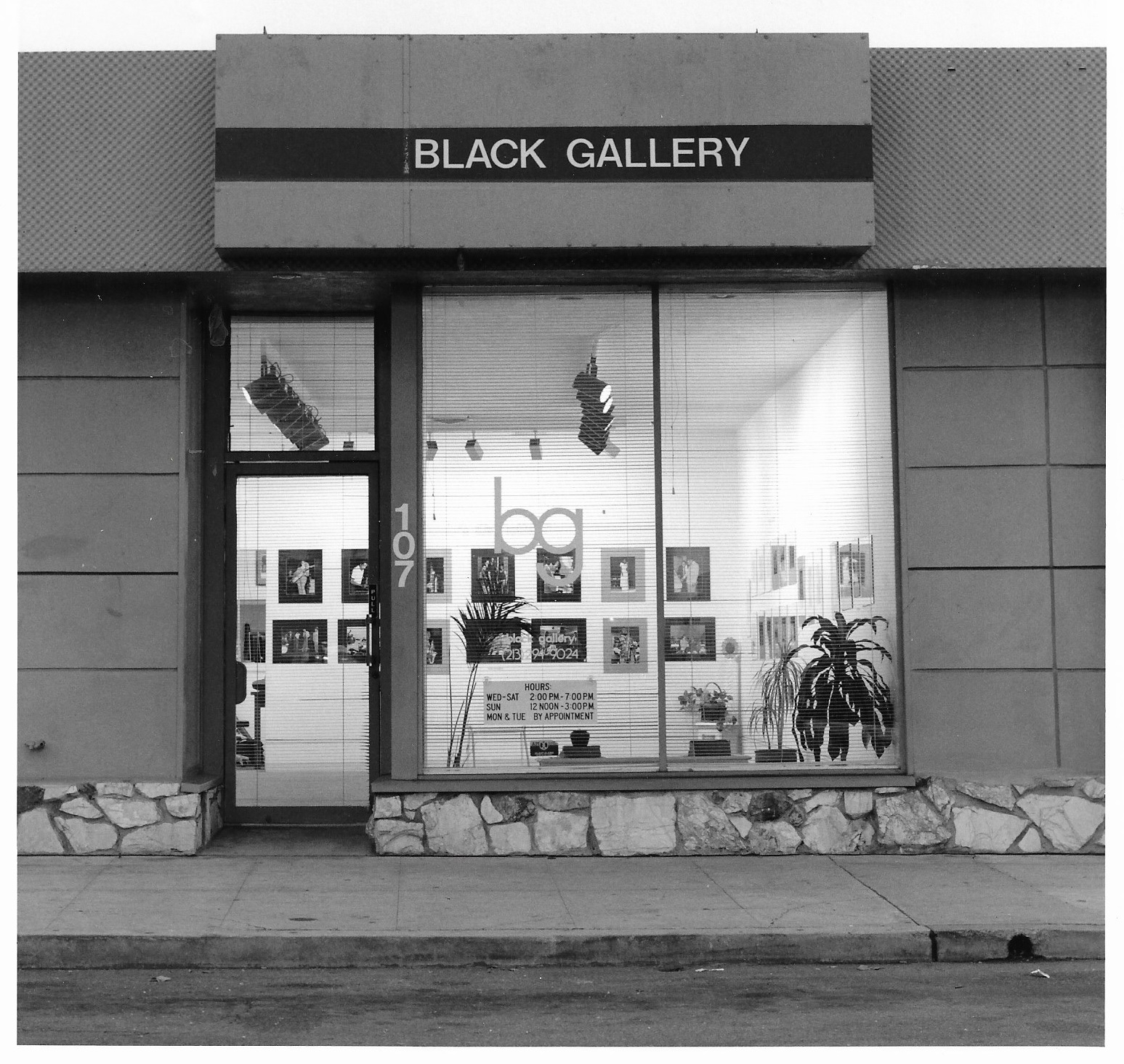
The Black Gallery (1984-1998), dedicated exhibition space for African American photographers, located at 107 Santa Barbara Plaza, Los Angeles, CA.

The success of the show led Charles to help found the Black Photographers of California, a nonprofit educational institution for emerging and established African American Photographers. Sponsored by that organization, Charles and co-founders Calvin Hicks, Donald Bernard, and Gil Garner started the Black Gallery in Santa Barbara Plaza, now Marlton Square. Supported by grants and donations, the gallery curated and encouraged black photographers. Charles later said, “L.A. is very rich visually, but most images that are supposed to represent it are not done by people in the community.” Hicks stated that the Black Gallery was “the first gallery in the black community dedicated to black photography.”

The gallery served as an incubator for black photographers, offering workshops and slide sharing, as well as a meeting place and coffee house for other events. Charles and his co-founders were part of a burgeoning group of black gallerists in Los Angeles, like Dale and Alonzo Davis of Brockman Gallery, who are credited with the first major gallery run by and for black artists.

The cooperation among these galleries and the community of black artists in Los Angeles had given rise to a thriving art scene by the 1970s, and it was into this scene that Charles arrived as a curator in the 1980s. “The cooperation among the galleries has created a bond, a new kind of spirit and a camaraderie,” Charles told the L.A. Times in 1985.

Charles and the other co-founders of the Black Gallery wanted to foster and promote a range of black creative expression, focused on a nuanced depiction of black life in America that pushed back against stereotypes and visual tropes. Charles told an interviewer: "Growing up in New Orleans, the only images of blacks that I saw were sharecroppers. I didn't know we had a history and culture above and beyond that.”

In the 1990s, Charles and the Black Gallery struggled with vandalism, and had windows in their gallery broken many times. This led Charles to initiate a variety of community outreach and school programs aimed at emphasizing the value of art in the community.

The Black Gallery closed in 1998 and its archives were donated to the Tom and Ethel Bradley Center at California State University, Northridge.

== Selected exhibitions ==
Charles's photographs were included in several local and national exhibitions.

- Jazz Photography: M. Hanks Gallery Celebrates Black History Month, a group exhibit of photographs by Ray Avery, Bob Douglas and Roland Charles at the M. Hanks Gallery in Los Angeles, March 1991.
- “What Happened” in L.A.: Civil Disturbance: L.A. 1992, a group exhibit at the Louis Stern Galleries in Beverly Hills, California, in October 1992.
- Human Breath, a group show at the Korean Cultural Center, Los Angeles, in January 1996.
- Los Angeles: Then and Now, a group exhibit at the Los Angeles Central Library in 1994. Photographs by Laura Aguilar, Roland Charles, Irene Fertik, Claire Henze, Peter Kelly, Christian Morland, and William Reagh documented 25 years in Los Angeles.
- African American Representation of Masculinity, a group exhibition organized by curator Cecil Fergerson and a group of black artists calling themselves the Coalition for the Survival of Community Arts. The group formed in response New York’s Whitney Museum exhibit “Black Male: Representations of Masculinity in Contemporary American Art” curated by Thelma Golden. The central question the coalition asked is “Can black American reclaim control of its image?” Sixty-seven artists participated including Roland Charles, Mark Greenfield, John Outterbridge, and Pat Ward Williams. The exhibition was presented throughout 1995 at the William Grant Still Arts Center, the Museum of African-American Art, and the Watts Towers Arts Center.
- Five African-American Artists Working In L.A. Today, at the Downey Museum of Art in Downey, from ? to March 2, 1997. Cecil Fergerson curated the exhibit. The five artists included Cedric Adams, Roland Charles, Charles Dickson, Varnette Honeywood and Elliot Pinkney.
- Black Photographers of Los Angeles, a panel discussion and slideshow at the Getty Center with Roland Charles, Don Cropper, Jack Davis and Bob Douglas, November 11, 1998.
- Contemplating the Millennium, a group show at the Mount San Jacinto College Fine Arts Gallery, January–February 1999. Artists included Cedric Adams, Dale Brockman, Roland Charles, Leah M. Doyle, Juanita Cole Howard, Keba Konte, Dominique Moody, Elliot Pinkney and Rufus Shoddy.
- Fade (1990-2003), a survey of African-American artists in Los Angeles from the Great Depression to the Present, at Cal State Los Angeles Luckman Gallery and the Craft and Folk Art Museum, Los Angeles, February 2004.
- Identity & Affirmation: Post-War African-American Photography, an exhibit at California State University Northridge, as part of the Pacific Standard Time: Art in L.A., 1945–1980, October 23–December 10, 2011. Photographers featured in the exhibit included Roland Charles, Guy Crowder, Jack Davis, Bob Douglas, Joe Flowers, Maxie Floyd, Calvin Hicks, Bob Moore, and Charles Williams.
- V.A.R.I.O.U.S. Media INK Visionary Artists Showcase & Networking Events 1980-1983 Roland Charles exhibited multiple times in this Interactive Artists Showcase at the LA Department of Water and Power’s theater @ 100 No. Hope Street and at equity waiver theaters all over LA County. His participation in bringing a donated projection screen we strapped to the roof of his car was invaluable to the audiences who attended the showcases to be inspired and participate in presenting their art and photography. He was a good friend who just crossed my mind.

== Selected exhibits as curator ==
- A Day in the Life of Black Los Angeles, an exhibit of 120 photographs taken on Martin Luther King Day in 1988, at the Museum of African-American Art in Los Angeles, co-curated with Thomas L. Wright, February 1988. Ten photographers were featured including Nathaniel Bellamy, Don Cropper, Calvin Hicks, James Jeffrey and Karen Kennedy.
- Nudes: Classic & Conceptual, a group show at the Black Gallery, Los Angeles, September–October 1989. Featured photographers included Diana Edwardson, Calvin Hicks, James Jeffrey, Sandra Ramirez, Willie Middlebrook and Roland Charles.
- Life in a Day of Black L.A., a traveling companion exhibit to the book, which began at the UCLA Extension Design Center in Santa Monica, CA on December 6, 1992, then moving to the California African-American Museum in April 1993, before continuing on a nationwide tour. Participating artists included Roland Charles, Nathaniel Bellamy, Don Cropper, Calvin Hicks, James Jeffrey, Mike Jones, Karen Kennedy, Rod Lyons, Willie Middlebrook, and Akili-Casundria Ramsess.
- Crossing L.A.: The Visual Arts, a group exhibit at the Museum of African-American Art in Los Angeles in August, 1993.
- After Apartheid: In Search of a Black Middle Class: South Africa, a show of photographs by David Lurie, at the Los Angeles Photography Center in April, 1994, and at Cypress College, in Cypress, California, Nov-Dec, 1994.
- Collaborations, a joint exhibit of 25 black artists and Korean-American artists in Koreatown and South Central Los Angeles, co-curated with Julie Sim-Edwards following the 1992 Los Angeles Riots. April 1995. Participating artists included Byong Ok Min and Gary Williams.
- African American Representations of Masculinity, a show of photography by and about African American men, curated with Donald Bernard and Willie Robert Middlebrook, at the Watts Towers Arts Center in Los Angeles, May–June 1995.
- Bobtown: The Legacy of Robert Celestin, a 25-year retrospective of life in a 100-year-old Black rural community, founded in South Louisiana by Charles' great grandfather, Robert Celestin. Bobtown has been exhibited at the Terrebonne Museum and galleries at Dillard University and Nicholls State University.

== Bibliography ==
Charles’ photographs were published in several books, including:

- Charles, Roland; Igus, Toyomi (1992), Life in a Day of Black L.A: the way we see it: L.A.'s Black photographers present a new perspective on their city., University of California, Los Angeles. Center for Afro-American Studies, ISBN 9780934934398, OCLC 1001920718 Photographers featured in this book included Cedric Adams, Nathaniel Bellamy, Roland Charles, Don Cropper, Calvin Hicks, James Jeffries, Mike Jones, Rod Lyons, Willie Middlebrook, Akili Casundria Ramsess, and Karen Kennedy.
- Willis, Deborah; Williams, Carla (2002), The Black Female Body: A Photographic History, Temple University Press, ISBN 9781566399289, OCLC 919982354 Selected photographs by Charles are included.
- Von Blum, Paul (2004), Resistance, Dignity, and Pride: African American Artists in Los Angeles, The Regents of the University of California, ISBN 9780934934466, OCLC 760404532 Sixteen profiles and images from noted Black artists including Ernie Barnes, Lavialle Campbell, Varnette Honeywood, Samella Lewis, Willie Middlebrook, John Outterbridge, William Pajaud, Elliot Pinkney, Ramsess, Sandra Rowe, Betye Saar, Alison Saar, C. Ian White, Pat Ward Williams, Richard Wyatt, and Roland Charles. Charles’ photograph, Cecil Fergerson, the Community Curator (1994) is featured on the book’s cover.
- Charles, Roland; McNeil, Dee Dee (2009), Haiku in my Neighborhood, M. Hanks Gallery, ISBN 9780982181010, OCLC 665178915 50 haiku poems written by jazz singer and songwriter Dee Dee McNeil with photographs by Charles.

== Collections ==
Charles’s photographs are included in collections at the California African American Museum, The Schomburg Center for Research in Black Culture, and The Getty Center for the History of Arts and The Humanities. The collected archives of the Black Photographers of California, including over 50,000 photographs taken by Charles, are housed at the Tom & Ethel Bradley Center in the University Library at California State University, Northridge.

Interviews that Charles conducted with other Black photographers are also stored in the archives of the Bradley Center.

== Death ==
Roland Charles died of complications from a heart attack on May 26, 2000. After his death, his wife, deBorah Charles, curated several exhibits of his work, and published a book of his photographs.
