= 1926 United States Senate election in Kansas =

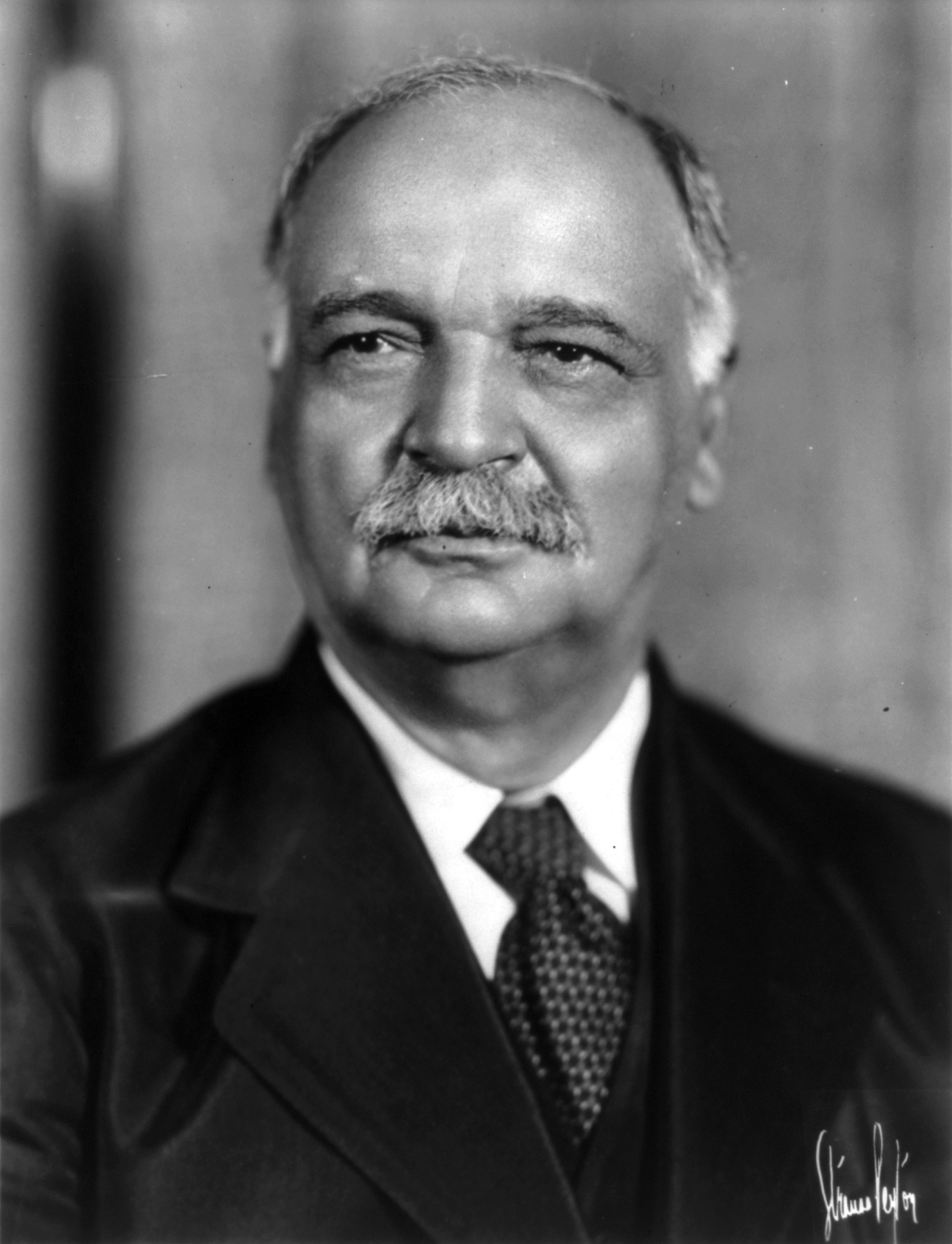

Nominee	Charles Curtis	Charles Stephens
Party	Republican	Democratic
Popular vote	308,222	168,446
Percentage	63.57%	34.74%
- County results Curtis: 50–60% 60–70% 70–80% Stephens: 40–50% 50–60%
U.S. senator before election
Charles Curtis
Republican
Elected U.S. senator
Charles Curtis
Republican

The 1926 United States Senate election in Kansas was held on November 2, 1926. Incumbent Republican Senator Charles Curtis ran for re-election to his third consecutive term and his fourth term overall. In the Republican primary, he defeated Nick Chiles, who was the editor of the Topeka Plaindealer and the first black U.S. Senate candidates following the adoption of the direct election of U.S. senators pursuant to the 17th Amendment to the U.S. Constitution. In the general election, Curtis faced Democratic Party nominee Charles Stephens, who was an attorney. Curtis overwhelmingly defeated Stephens to win re-election. Two years into Curtis's term, he was nominated at the 1928 Republican National Convention as presidential nominee Herbert Hoover's running mate, and, following his election as Vice President, a special election would be held in 1930 to fill out the remaining four years in his term.

== Democratic primary ==
=== Candidates ===
- Charles Stephens, Columbus attorney
- George McGill, former Sedgwick County Attorney

=== Results ===
Democratic primary results
Party	Candidate	Votes	%
Democratic	Charles Stephens	28,823	53.20%
Democratic	George McGill	25,360	46.80%
Total votes		54,183	100.00%

== Republican primary ==
=== Candidates ===
Nick Chiles, Curtis's primary opponent

- Charles Curtis, incumbent U.S. senator
- Nick Chiles, editor of the Topeka Plaindealer

=== Results ===
Republican primary results
Party	Candidate	Votes	%
Republican	Charles Curtis (inc.)	185,964	85.61%
Republican	Nick Chiles	31,253	14.39%
Total votes		217,217	100.00%

== Socialist primary ==
=== Candidates ===
- M. L. Phillips, McDonald farmer

=== Results ===
Socialist primary results
Party	Candidate	Votes	%
Socialist	M. L. Phillips	160	100.00%
Total votes		160	100.00%

== General election ==
=== Results ===
1926 United States Senate election in Kansas
Party	Candidate	Votes	%	±%
Republican	Charles Curtis (inc.)	308,222	63.57%	−0.45%
Democratic	Charles Stephens	168,446	34.74%	+1.38%
Socialist	M. L. Phillips	8,208	1.69%	−0.93%
Write-in		2	0.00%	—
Majority		139,776	28.83%	−1.83%
Total votes		484,878	100.00%	
Republican hold				

== See also ==
- 1926 United States Senate elections
