= Tankard (surname) =

Tankard is a surname. Notable people with the surname include:

- Ben Tankard (born 1964), American sportsman and musician
- James W. Tankard, Jr. (1941–2005), American non-fiction writer
- Jeremy Tankard, British type designer
- John Tankard (died 1343), Irish bishop
- Meryl Tankard (born 1955), Australian dancer and choreographer

== See also ==
- Tankard (disambiguation)
