= Allissa Richardson =

American journalism scholar and author

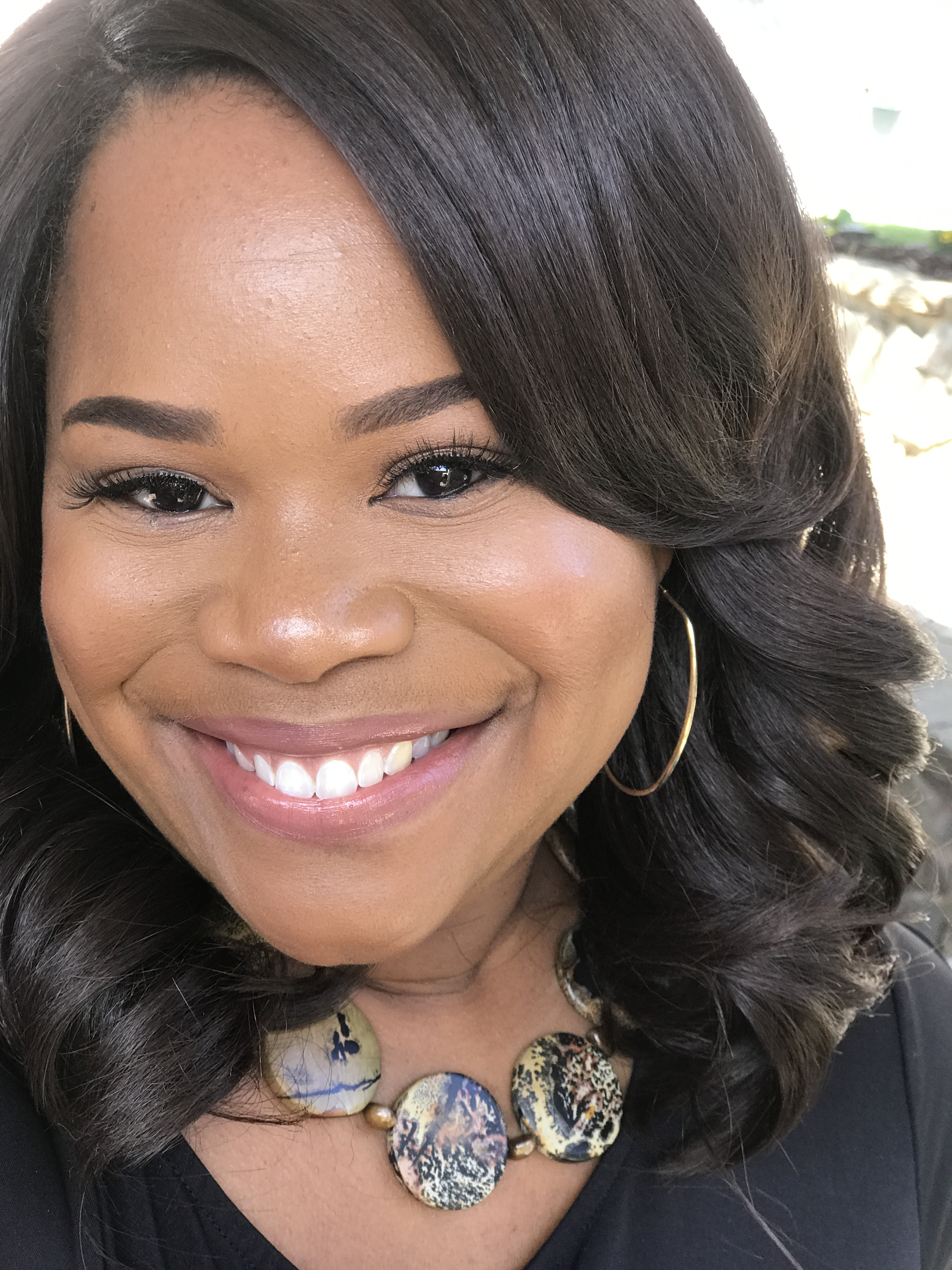
- Born: Allissa V. Richardson; Washington, D.C.
- Education: Xavier University of Louisiana; Northwestern University; University of Maryland
- Occupations: Journalism scholar, author, professor
- Website: www.allissavrichardson.com

Allissa V. Richardson is an American journalism scholar, author, and former journalist. She is an associate professor of journalism and communication at the USC Annenberg School for Communication and Journalism and director of the Charlotta Bass Journalism and Justice Lab.

Her research examines race, journalism, mobile and social media, digital witnessing, and the use of emerging technologies in journalism.

Richardson is the author of Bearing Witness While Black: African Americans, Smartphones, and the New Protest #Journalism, published by Oxford University Press in 2020. The book examines how Black witnesses have used smartphones and social media to document racial injustice and situates those practices within a longer history of African American journalism and testimony.

Her scholarship develops the concept of Black witnessing, a framework for understanding Black testimonial and journalistic practices in relation to race, media, power, and collective memory.

== Education ==
Richardson earned a Bachelor of Science in biology from Xavier University of Louisiana, a master's degree in journalism from Northwestern University's Medill School of Journalism, and a PhD in journalism studies from the University of Maryland, College Park.

Her doctoral research examined Black mobile journalists and activists who used smartphones and social media to document the Black Lives Matter movement. The research later formed part of the basis for Bearing Witness While Black.

== Career ==
Richardson began her professional career in journalism and worked for publications including Jet. She later entered journalism education, teaching at Morgan State University and Bowie State University before joining the University of Southern California.

At Morgan State University, Richardson launched and directed the Morgan MOJO Lab, an instructional initiative centered on mobile journalism. Students in the lab learned to report using mobile devices.

Richardson later joined the faculty of the University of Southern California's Annenberg School for Communication and Journalism. She holds appointments in journalism and communication and directs the Charlotta Bass Journalism and Justice Lab.

Richardson has held fellowships at Harvard University's Nieman Foundation for Journalism, the Berkman Klein Center for Internet & Society, and the Carr Center for Human Rights Policy at Harvard Kennedy School. In 2014, she was selected as a visiting fellow at the Nieman Foundation, where she worked on developing a mobile journalism massive open online course.

== Research ==
Richardson's scholarship focuses on the ways Black communities use media technologies to document events, produce counter-narratives, and challenge established journalistic accounts.

Her article "Bearing Witness While Black: Theorizing African American Mobile Journalism after Ferguson" examined Black citizen journalists' use of smartphones and social media in the period following the killing of Michael Brown in Ferguson, Missouri.

Her book Bearing Witness While Black expands that framework by placing smartphone documentation within a longer history of Black testimonial and journalistic practices, including slave narratives, the Black press, civil-rights-era media, and contemporary documentation of police violence.

A review in Boom California described Richardson's concept of Black witnessing as a framework that connects contemporary smartphone documentation to longer traditions of Black truth-telling, political struggle, and the production of counter-narratives about race and power.

Richardson has also written and spoken about the ethical consequences of repeatedly circulating images of anti-Black violence. In a 2020 interview with The Guardian, she discussed the role of smartphones in documenting police brutality as well as the ethical implications of sharing graphic images of Black death.

== Bearing Witness While Black ==
Oxford University Press published Bearing Witness While Black: African Americans, Smartphones, and the New Protest #Journalism in 2020.

The book draws on interviews with 15 mobile journalist-activists and examines smartphones, social media, protest journalism, and visual culture in the Black Lives Matter era.

The book received honors from the National Association of Black Journalists, the Association for Education in Journalism and Mass Communication, and the International Journal of Press/Politics.

== Selected works ==
- Richardson, Allissa V. (2017). "Bearing Witness While Black: Theorizing African American Mobile Journalism after Ferguson". Digital Journalism. 5 (6): 673–698. doi:10.1080/21670811.2016.1193818.
- Richardson, Allissa V. (2020). Bearing Witness While Black: African Americans, Smartphones, and the New Protest #Journalism. Oxford University Press. doi:10.1093/oso/9780190935528.001.0001.

== Selected honors ==
- 2012 – Journalism Educator of the Year, National Association of Black Journalists.
- 2014 – Nieman Foundation Visiting Journalism Fellow, Harvard University.
- 2020 – Outstanding Book of the Year, National Association of Black Journalists.
- 2020 – Kappa Tau Alpha/Frank Luther Mott Book of the Year Award, Association for Education in Journalism and Mass Communication.
- 2021 – Tankard Book Award, Association for Education in Journalism and Mass Communication.
- 2021 – Hazel Gaudet-Erskine Best Book Award, International Journal of Press/Politics.
