= Calvin Hicks =

Calvin Hicks may refer to:

- Calvin Hicks (journalist) (1933–2013), African-American journalist, activist, editor, and music educator
- Calvin Hicks (photographer) (1941–2012), African-American photographer and gallerist
