= The Vindicator (Kansas newspaper) =

- Type: Weekly newspaper
- Format: Print
- Founded: December 17, 1904?
- Ceased publication: November 2, 1906?
- Language: English
- Headquarters: Coffeyville, Kansas, United States
- City: Coffeyville, Kansas
- Country: United States
- OCLC number: 12257304

The Vindicator was a weekly African American newspaper published in Coffeyville, Kansas, from 1904 to 1906. It carried political editorials and commentary on race, civil rights, school segregation, and electoral politics. The newspaper has been cited in academic research on Black press opposition to school segregation legislation passed in Kansas in 1905.

== History ==
The Vindicator began publication on December 17, 1904. It was issued weekly, and surviving issues show that it remained in print through at least November 2, 1906.

In 1905, the Kansas legislature debated legislation permitting school segregation in certain cities, directly affecting the African American community of Kansas City, Kansas. The Vindicator published editorials opposing the campaign, alongside similar coverage in the Topeka Plaindealer and the American Citizen. In its February 17, 1905 issue, it rejected claims that white students had driven the segregation agitation, blaming parents, school officials, and party figures instead. The following week it at times criticized legislators by name and reported allegations that pro-segregation telegrams to Governor Edward W. Hoch had been padded with fictitious names.

== Content ==
Surviving issues show that the newspaper at times named legislators and criticized political figures directly on questions of race, civil rights, and electoral politics. The November 2, 1906 front page carried the headline "The Negroes Must Not Help Turn Kansas Over to Southern Democracy."

== Archival status ==
The Vindicator survives in digital archives across several institutions. The Kansas State Historical Society holds approximately 577 searchable pages from 1904 to 1906. The Library of Congress lists database coverage from December 17, 1904 to February 9, 1906. The University of Illinois Urbana-Champaign newspaper database lists the title as available online for 1904 to 1906. Additional issues are accessible through GenealogyBank and Newspapers.com.
