= Victorine Spears Kinloch =

African American suffragist (1885–1951)

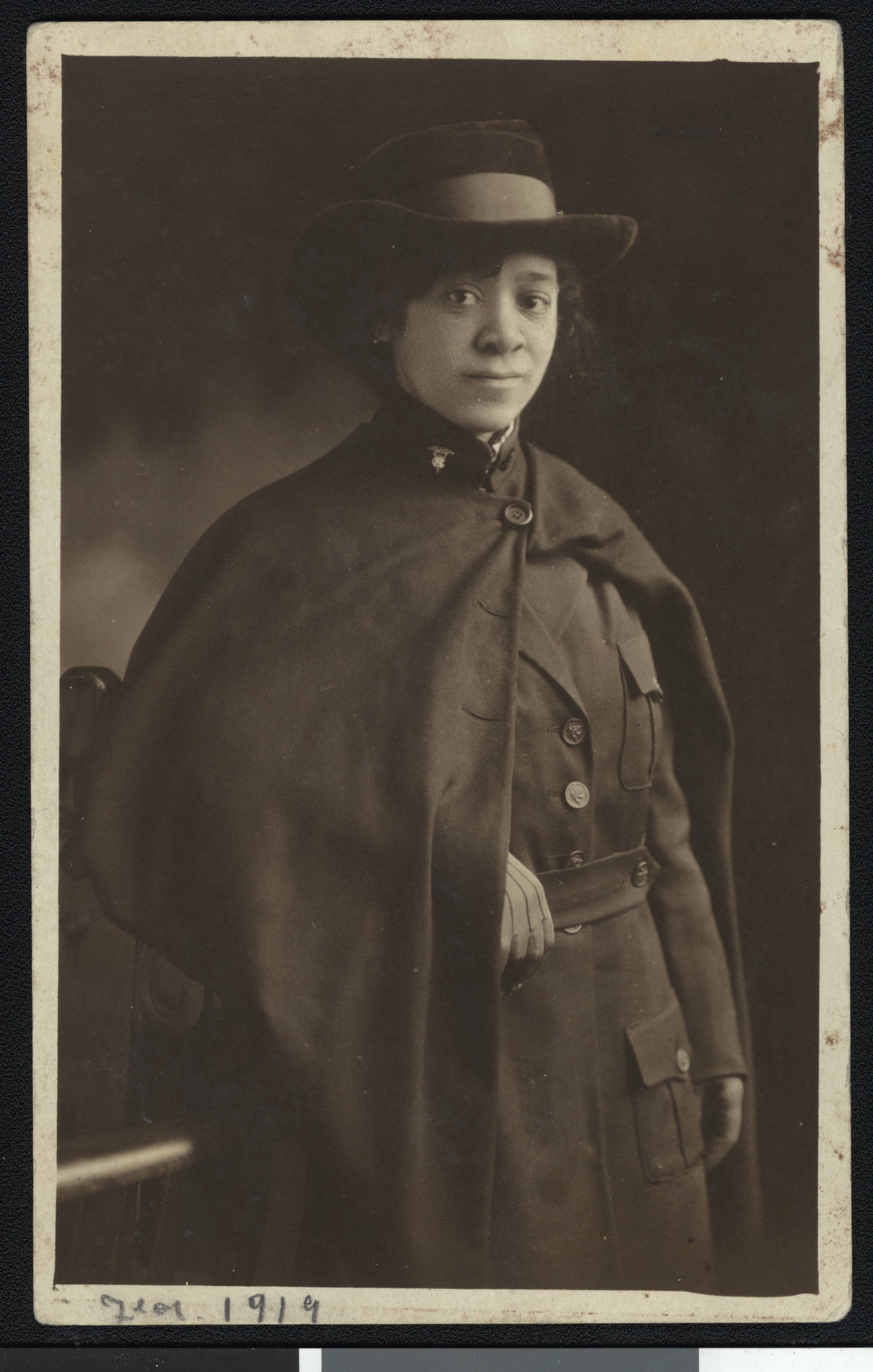
- Kinloch in 1919
- Born: 1885; South Carolina, US
- Died: October 25, 1951 (aged 65–66); New York City, US
- Spouse: James Alexander Kinloch
- Children: 1

Victorine Spears Kinloch (1885 - 1951) was an African-American suffragist who lived and worked in Rhode Island, New York, and California. Her sister Charlotta Bass is well known for her civil rights activities in Los Angeles.

== Biography ==
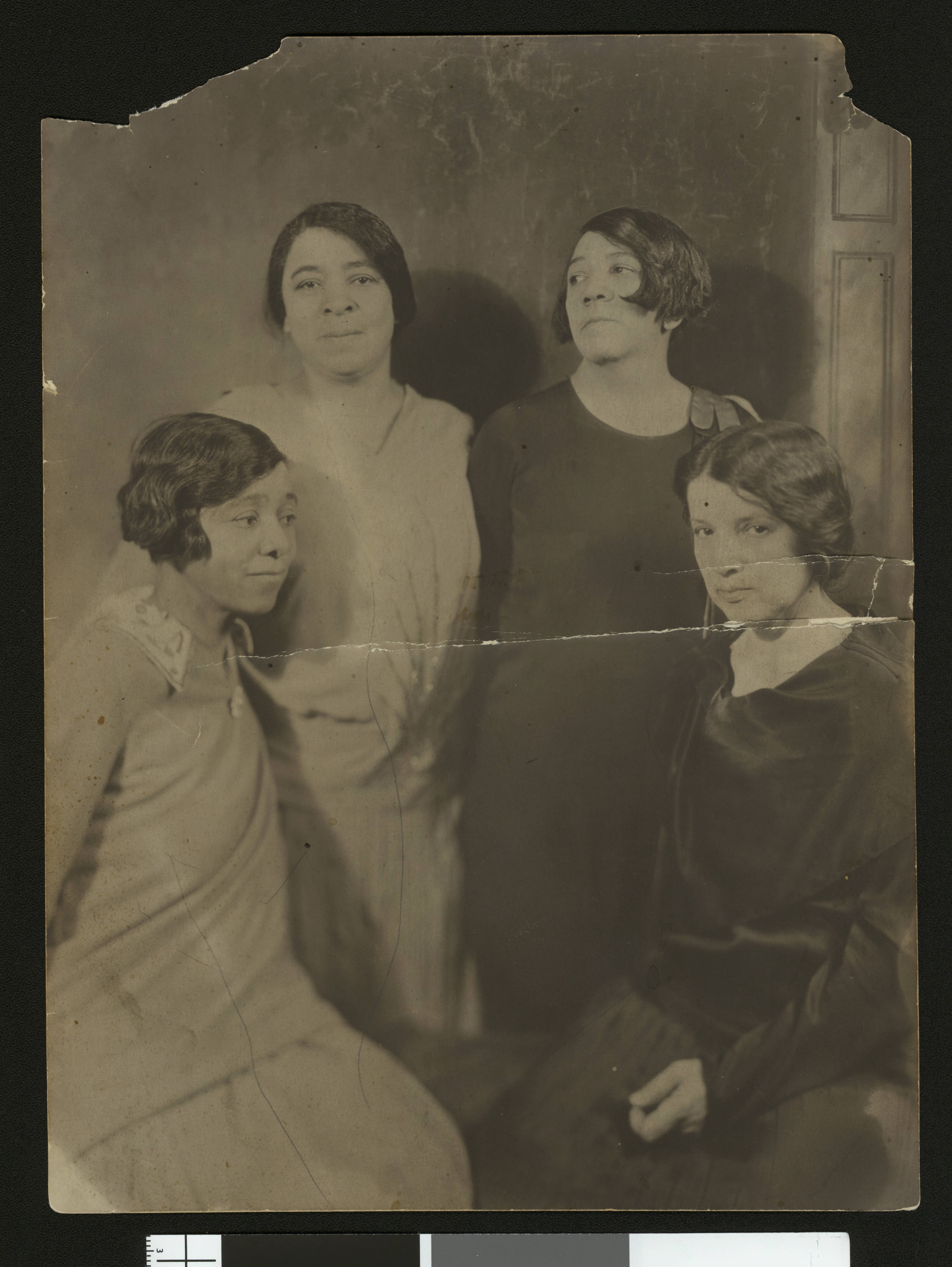
Charlotta Bass and three women, circa 1901/1910. Photograph of Charlotta Bass, second from left, and her sister, Victorine Spears Kinloch, left. The other two women may be Bass's other sisters, Lillian and Lena.

Victorine Spears was born in 1885 in South Carolina. Her parents were Hiram and Kate Spears, a prominent Black couple in the area. She and her sister Charlotta Bass were among the eleven children in the family.

As a young woman, she moved from South Carolina to Providence, RI, with her sister Charlotta. They lived with their brother Ellis Spears.

=== Suffrage activism ===
In 1916, Kinloch signed the Resolution of the RI Union Colored Women's Clubs Supporting the Federal Woman Suffrage Amendment. Her signature joined those of other Black women including Mary E. Jackson.

She moved from Rhode Island to New York, New York around 1920. In New York, she worked as a dressmaker in a private shop and her husband Kinloch made cigars.

She lived in New York until at least 1940. She was likely part of the NAACP, and highly involved in her community. She supported community efforts like fundraising for a Flood Relief Committee. She was part of the New Englanders club and planned or sponsored their events, and an officer of the Harlem Housewives League.

She moved to California with her son John and husband James, settling near her sister Charlotta Bass. Bass owned and operated the California Eagle, the first Black woman-owned newspaper in America. Bass did not have children and intended for her nephew John Kinloch to take over the paper when she retired. However, Kinloch died in Germany during World War II.

=== Marriage and children ===
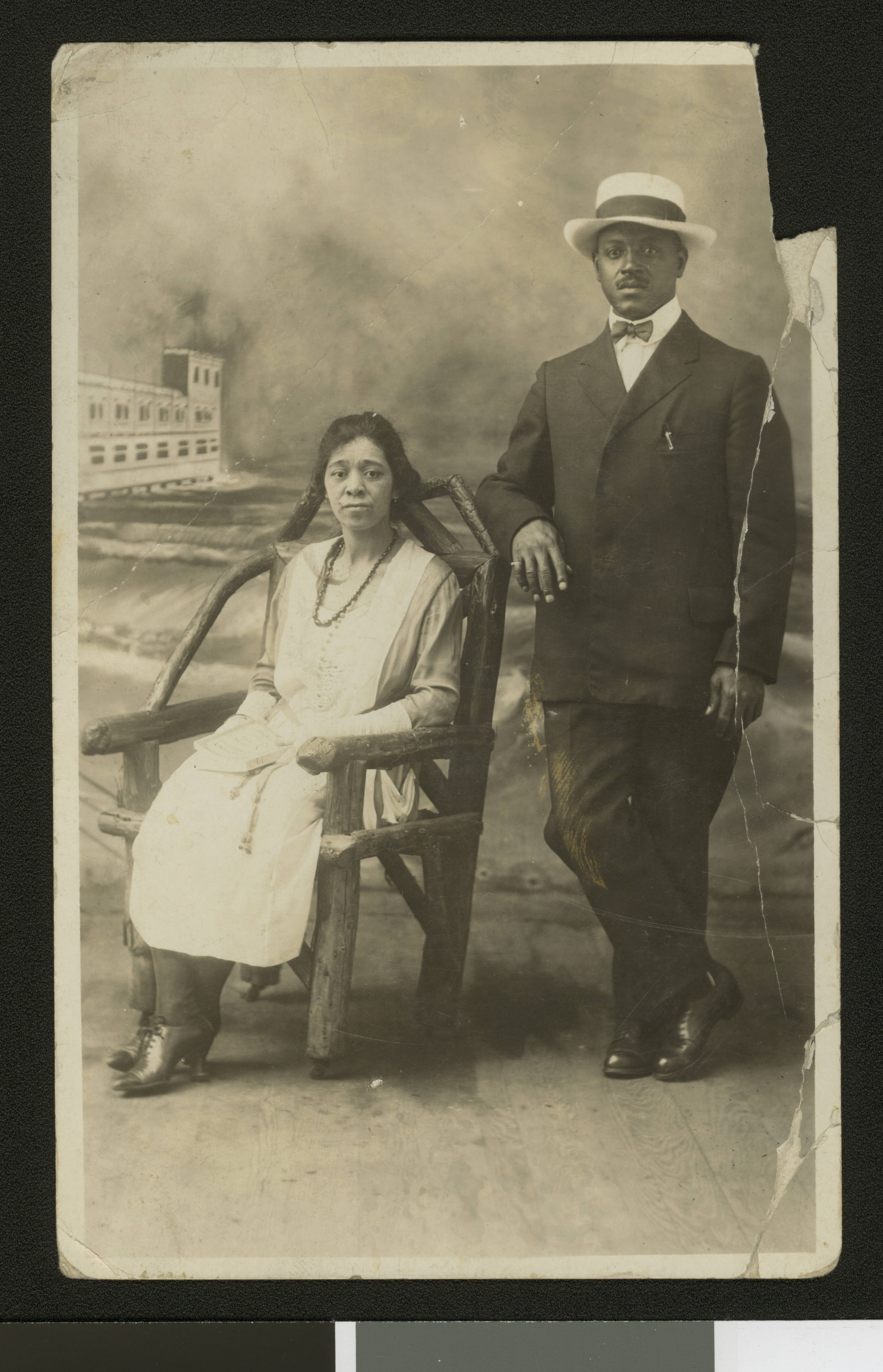
Victorine Spears Kinloch and Alexander Kinloch (?), July 12, 1920, Atlantic City

In 1921, she married James Alexander Kinloch in New York. Their son, John Spears Kinloch, was born that same year.

Her son John Kinloch worked for his aunt Bass before he joined the military. He died in Germany on April 3, 1945, during WWII.

=== Death and legacy ===
Victorine Spears Kinloch died on October 25, 1951, in New York City.

She predeceased her son. His remaining insurance policy passed to Charlotta Bass.

== See also ==
- African-American women's suffrage movement
- Black suffrage in the United States
- California Eagle
- Charlotta Bass
- Women's suffrage in California
- Women's suffrage in Rhode Island
