= Tankard (disambiguation) =

A tankard is a form of drinkware.

Tankard or The Tankard may also refer to:

- Tankard (surname), including a list of people with the surname
- Tankard (band), a German thrash metal band
  - The Tankard (album), a 1995 album by the band
- Tankard Inn, a public house in Rufforth, City of York, England
- The Tankard, the name of several Canadian men's provincial curling championships:
  - Alberta Tankard, now known as the Boston Pizza Cup
  - Labatt Tankard (Manitoba), now known as the Viterra Championship
  - New Brunswick Tankard
  - Newfoundland and Labrador Tankard
  - Nova Scotia Tankard
  - Ontario Tankard
  - PEI Tankard
  - Quebec Tankard
  - SaskTel Tankard (Saskatchewan)
