= Thelma Chiles Taylor =

American editor

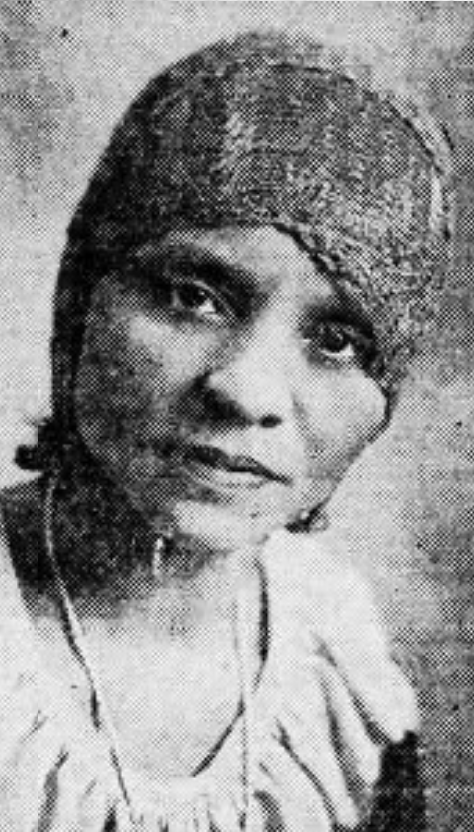
- Thelma Chiles Taylor, from a 1930 newspaper
- Born: Thelma Ida May Mercer Chiles; December 7, 1900; Topeka, Kansas, U.S.
- Died: May 30, 1984 (aged 83); Wahiawa, Hawaii, U.S.
- Other name: Thelma Chiles Lee
- Occupations: Editor, poet, educator, publisher

Thelma Ida May Mercer Chiles Taylor Lee (December 7, 1900 – May 30, 1984) was an American newspaper editor, journalist, poet, librarian, and educator. She was editor and owner of the Topeka Plaindealer, a weekly newspaper serving Black communities in Kansas, Colorado, Oklahoma, and Missouri, from 1930 to 1932.

== Early life and education ==
Chiles's father, Nick Chiles, c. 1901

Chiles was born in Topeka, Kansas, the daughter of Nick Chiles and Minnie Elizabeth Morris Chiles. She graduated from the University of Michigan in 1923. She was a member of the Delta Sigma Theta sorority.

== Career ==
Taylor taught school in Gary, Indiana, and Chicago after college, and was a librarian at Virginia State College. She took over as editor and owner of the weekly Topeka Plaindealer in 1930, after her father died. She wrote an editorial supporting senator Henry J. Allen, a fellow newspaper owner.

In 1932 Taylor was appointed librarian of the Kansas Vocational School, and she wrote "State Capitol News", a column for The Kansas City American newspaper, on events on Topeka, including an appearance by Langston Hughes. She was vice-president of the Kansas Jeffersonian League in 1933. She spoke at a meeting of the C.M.E. Church council in 1935. In 1942 she lived in Kansas City, Missouri, and sponsored a women's book club and a bridge club. In 1945, she was a member of group representing Black women's organizations when it confronted Omar Bradley about racial segregation in veterans' hospitals.

Taylor was a member of the National Council of Negro Women and the National Negro Press Association. She also wrote and published poetry. Later in life, she worked as an education services officer at Wheeler Army Airfield in Honolulu.

== Personal life ==
Chiles married lawyer Euclid L. Taylor in 1924. They had a son, Nicholas, and divorced by 1930. She married newspaperman Davis Lee in 1936. She died in 1984, at the age of 83, in Wahiawā, Hawaii.
