= Guy Crowder =

American photographer (1940–2011)

- Born: Guy Rochester Crowder; 1940; Beaumont, Texas, U.S.
- Died: October 30, 2011 (aged 70–71); Riverside, California, U.S.
- Education: Los Angeles Harbor College; Los Angeles Trade–Technical College
- Occupation: Photographer
- Spouse: Patricia
- Children: 1

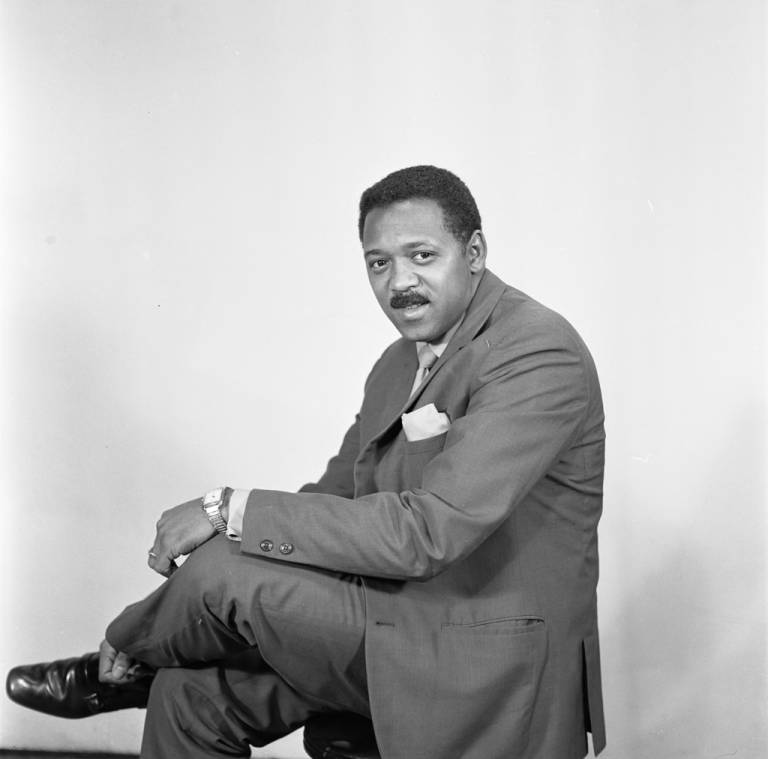
Guy Crowder Self Portrait

Guy Rochester Crowder (1940–2011) was an African-American photographer whose work appeared in many publications including the Los Angeles Sentinel. He was the first staff photographer for the Los Angeles County Board of Supervisors and the first African-American to work for that agency.

== Early life ==
Born in 1940 in Beaumont, Texas, Crowder moved with his family to Los Angeles in 1945. He graduated from high school in Compton, California and joined the Marine Corps Reserve, where he served from 1957 to 1963. Crowder also studied at Los Angeles Harbor College and Los Angeles Trade–Technical College.

== Career ==
Crowder started his career as a freelance photographer taking pictures of community events, since he was unable to find a job with one of the mainstream newspapers in Los Angeles due to his race. He built up a successful business, and developed a reputation and connections with prominent community members and politicians including Mervin Dymally, Jesse Unruh, and Kenneth Hahn. In 1974 he took a position with the Los Angeles Board of Supervisors as staff photographer, thus making him the first African-American to work for this government agency. Among the subjects of his photography over the years were Sammy Davis Jr., Michael Jackson, Ray Charles, Magic Johnson, Thurgood Marshall, Coretta Scott King, and Wynton Marsalis. Jet Magazine editor Aldore Collier said about Crowder, “His works vividly demonstrate the diversity, hope, sorrow and joy that is the Black community of Los Angeles.” At Crowder's funeral, Los Angeles Sentinel publisher Danny Bakewell stated that "Guy Crowder will be remembered as being one of the most talented and phenomenal Black photojournalists of our time. Not only will he be missed for his work, but for being an extraordinary person and the legacy he leaves with this city.”

== Personal life ==
Crowder was married to his wife Patricia for 51 years, and had one child, Reginald Crowder.

== Exhibitions ==
- Camera and Community: A Celebration by Guy R. Crowder(1993). California State University, Northridge.
- Black Life: Images of Resistance and Resilience in Southern California (2019). The San Diego Museum of Art. August 24, 2019 – December 1, 2019.

== Death and legacy ==
Crowder died of pneumonia and complications from a stroke on October 30, 2011, in Riverside, California. His photographic archive, which includes over 400,000 images, is preserved by the Tom and Ethel Bradley Center in the University Library Special Collections and Archives at California State University, Northridge.
