= John J. Neimore =

African-American publisher and editor

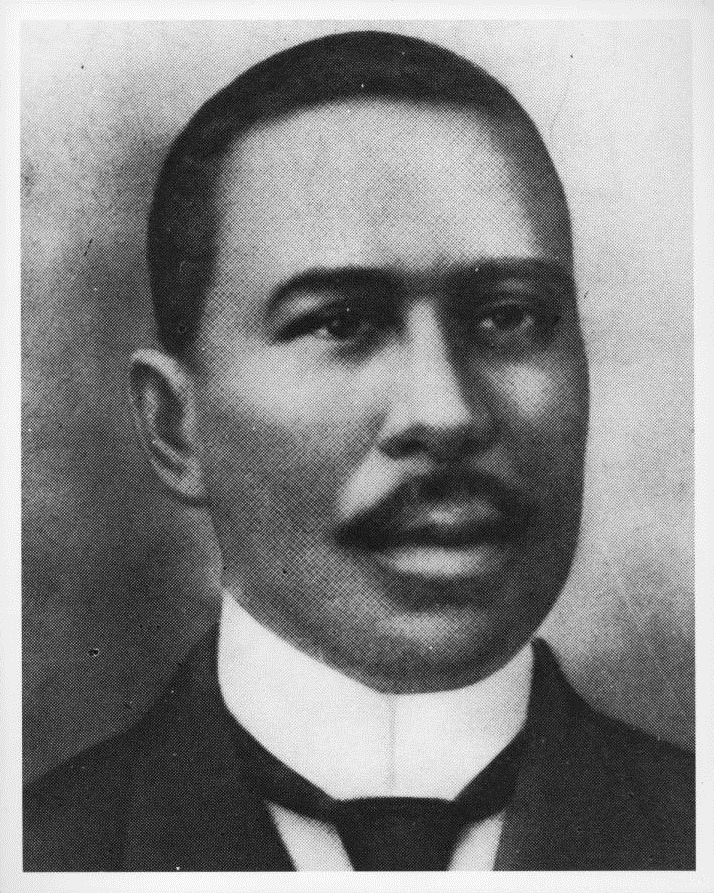
- John J. Neimore, circa 1901/1910, Los Angeles
- Born: John James Neimore; February 23, 1862; Washington County, Texas, U.S.
- Died: March 9, 1912 (aged 50); Los Angeles, California, U.S.
- Resting place: Angelus-Rosedale Cemetery
- Occupation(s): Newspaper publisher and editor
- Years active: 1879–1912
- Known for: Founding one of the first and oldest long-running African-American newspapers in California; Appointing a woman as his successor at The California Eagle
- Notable work: The California Eagle
- Successor: Charlotta Bass
- Spouse: Ida Lewis Neimore
- Children: 1

John James Neimore (February 23, 1862 – March 9, 1912) was a publisher and editor, who founded The California Eagle, the oldest African-American newspaper in the Western US. He appointed Charlotta Bass as his successor upon his death, making her one of the first African-American women to operate a newspaper.

== Publisher ==
Shortly after arriving in California from Texas, Neimore founded an African American newspaper entitled, The Owl in 1879. The weekly newspaper was short-lived, but Neimore joined forces with newspapermen Thomas Pearson and William Sampson to work on The Weekly Observer. He eventually left the Observer to found another newspaper, The Advocate, where he used his Republican political influence to discuss the issues facing African-American livelihood, including race relations and politics. From 1892 to 1895, he published the Southern California Guide. Soon after, he established The Eagle. The California Publishing Bureau and Investment Company published "The Eagle" with Neimore as the president and John Wesley Coleman the acting secretary. In 1912, the newspaper was renamed the California Eagle.

== Background ==
John James Neimore was born in Washington County, Texas circa 1862 to a farmer Daniel Neimore and his wife Susan Neimore. He was one of three children including sisters Henrietta Neimore Nunn and Mahilda Neimore Butler. In his late teens, he travelled west to Los Angeles, California and founded African-American newspaper, The Owl. As one of its first members, Neimore was a prominent figure in the historic Missionary Society Second Baptist Church, which was founded in Los Angeles in 1885.

== Marriage and family ==
On February 19, 1890, Neimore married Ida Neimore (née Lewis) in Los Angeles, California. Later that year on November 10, they had a daughter, Bessie Luretta Neimore. His 3rd great niece is Mignon Gould, an online publisher who launched one of the first virtual internship programs through the publication, The Chic Spy; as well as founded the observance Chic Spy Day, to celebrate the style of on-screen spies. Gould is a direct descendant of Neimore's sister, Henrietta Neimore Nunn.

== Legacy ==
Neimore founded one of the first African-American newspapers in California as a teenager, running the paper for more than three decades. He appointed Charlotta Bass as his successor upon his death, making her the first African-American woman to own a newspaper. Neimore established the original publication The Owl, to help newly arrived African-Americans adapt to life in Los Angeles. The newspaper contained information about housing, jobs and news items relevant to the African-American community. Charlotta Bass took a job selling subscriptions to the newspaper in 1910 and Neimore became her mentor. In 1912, Neimore was in very poor health. When he died, Bass took control of the newspaper and ran the California Eagle until she retired in 1951.
