= Charlotta Bass =

American politician and newspaper publisher

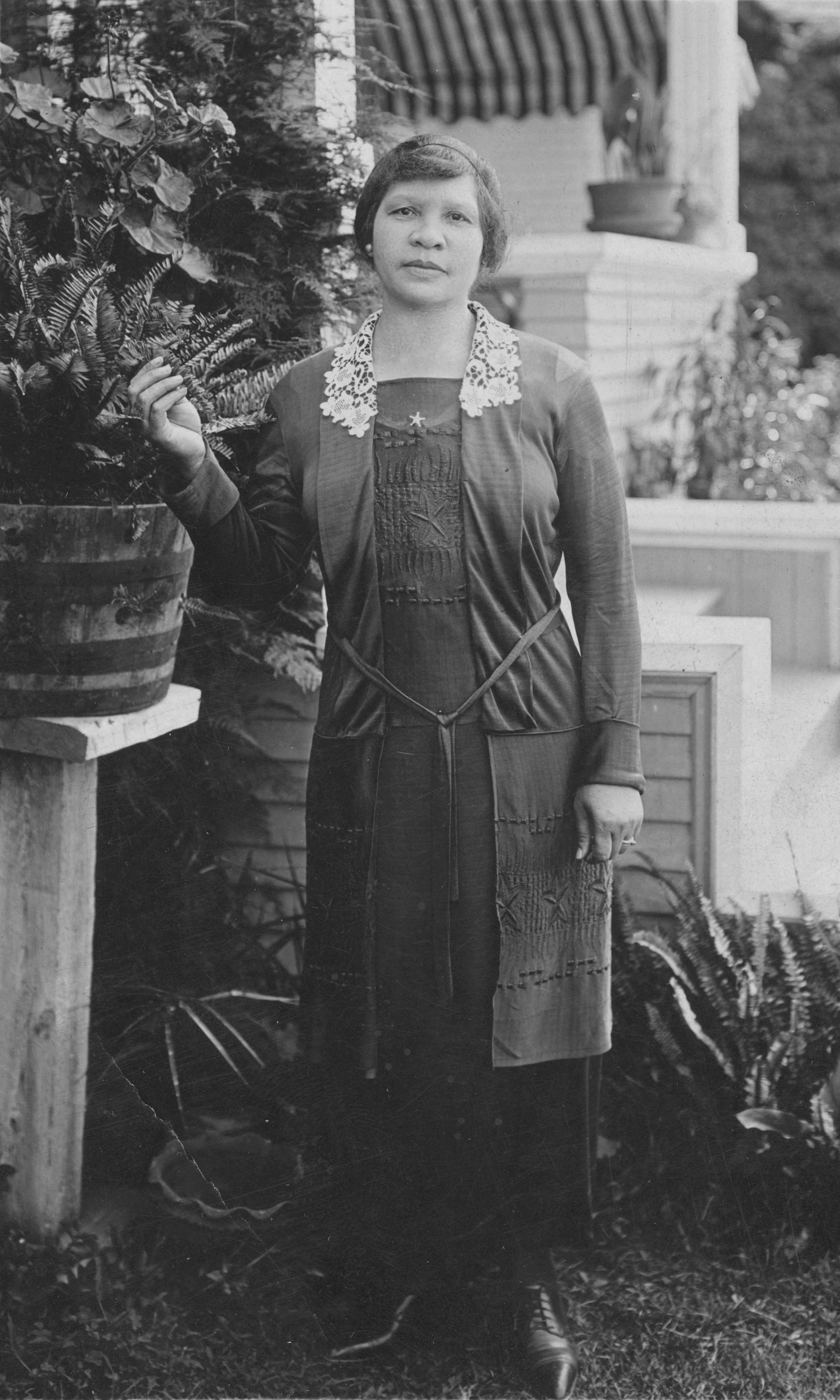
- Bass c. 1901–1910
- Born: Charlotta Amanda Spears; February 14, 1874; Sumter, South Carolina, or Little Compton, Rhode Island, U.S.
- Died: April 12, 1969 (aged 95); Los Angeles, California, U.S.
- Resting place: Evergreen Cemetery, East Los Angeles, California
- Occupations: educator, newspaper publisher/editor, and civil rights activist
- Known for: first African-American woman to own and operate a newspaper in the United States; first African-American woman nominated for Vice President
- Spouse: Joseph Bass

Charlotta Amanda Spears Bass (February 14, 1874 – April 12, 1969) was an American educator, newspaper publisher-editor, and civil rights activist. She also focused on various other issues such as housing rights, voting rights, and labor rights, as well as police brutality and harassment. Bass is believed to be the first African-American woman to own and operate a newspaper in the United States; she published the California Eagle from 1912 until 1951. In 1952, Bass became the first African-American woman nominated for Vice President, as a candidate of the Progressive Party.

Due to her activities, Bass was repeatedly accused of being part of the Communist Party, for which there was no evidence and which Bass herself repeatedly denied. She was monitored by the FBI, who continued to view her as a potential security threat until she was in her nineties.

== Background ==
Charlotta Amanda Spears was born on February 14, 1874, to Hiram and Kate Spears. Some sources give her birthplace as in Sumter, South Carolina, while other sources suggest she was born in Little Compton, Rhode Island. She was the sixth child of eleven. Her sister was Victorine Spears Kinloch. She received an education from public schools and one semester at Pembroke College in Brown University. When she was twenty years old, she moved to live with her brother Ellis in Providence, Rhode Island, where she worked selling subscriptions for the Providence Watchman, a local Black newspaper. Spears worked for the Providence Watchman for about ten years.

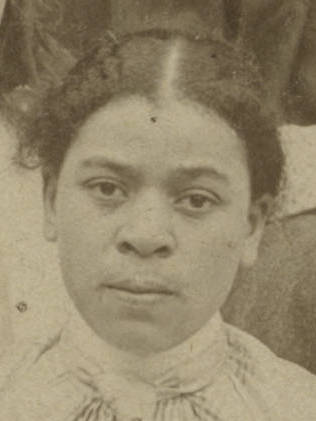
Charlotta Bass, from her high school class photo, Providence, Rhode Island, 1890s

She moved to California at age 36 for her health and ended up working at the California Eagle. Her first job at the California Eagle consisted of selling subscriptions. When its founder John Neimore died, she assumed the role of editor for the paper. She later became the owner of the California Eagle after purchasing it in auction for fifty dollars. At this time she took courses at Columbia University and University of California. In 1912, a new editor, Joseph Blackburn Bass, joined the Eagle. Bass had worked at the predecessor of the Topeka Plaindealer and established a newspaper in Montana. He shared his concern with Spears about the injustice and racial discrimination in society.

Spears married Joseph Bass and they ran the Eagle together. She had no children.

== California Eagle ==
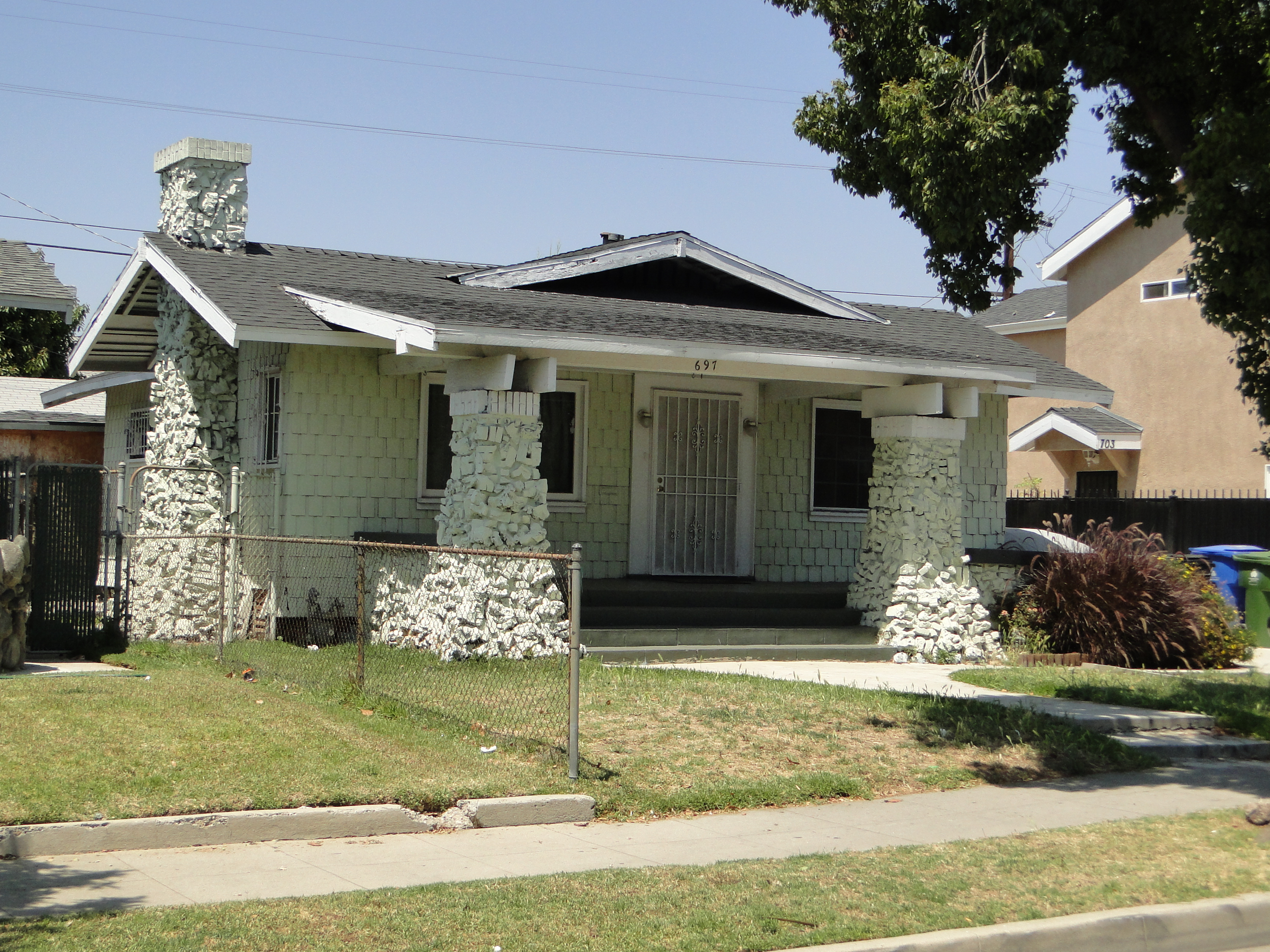
Charlotta Bass lived in the 52nd Place Historic District during the 1930s.

The Eagle, as it was first called, developed a large black readership. By 1925, the Eagle employed a staff of twelve and published twenty pages a week. The Eagle's circulation of 60,000 made it the largest African-American newspaper on the West Coast.

When the editor John J. Neimore became ill, he turned the operations of the Eagle over to Spears. After Neimore's death, "it turned out, this Black-founded newspaper was owned by a white man, who offered his support only if [Spears] would become his 'sweetheart.' 'Get out, you dirty dog!' she told him. She borrowed $50 from a local store owner to purchase the deed." She renamed the newspaper company to the California Eagle due to increasing social and political issues.

Her purpose for the California Eagle was to write about the wrongs of society. The newspaper served as a source of both information and inspiration for the black community, which was often ignored or negatively portrayed by the predominant white press. As publisher, Bass was committed to producing a quality periodical. In her weekly column "On the Sidewalk", begun in 1927, she drew attention to unjust social and political conditions for all Los Angeles minority communities and campaigned vigorously for reform.

The Eagle is credited as pioneering multi-ethnic politics, advocating Asian-American and Mexican-American civil rights in the 1940s, especially during World War II. Most Japanese Americans were relocated from the West Coast to interior detention camps after the attack on Pearl Harbor and fears about security. The California Eagle, along with other African-American presses, were under investigation by the Office of the Secretary of War, who viewed it as a threat to national security. The Department of Justice interrogated Bass in 1942 over claims that the paper was funded by Japan and Germany, fearing that criticism of the US was motivated by enemy alliances.

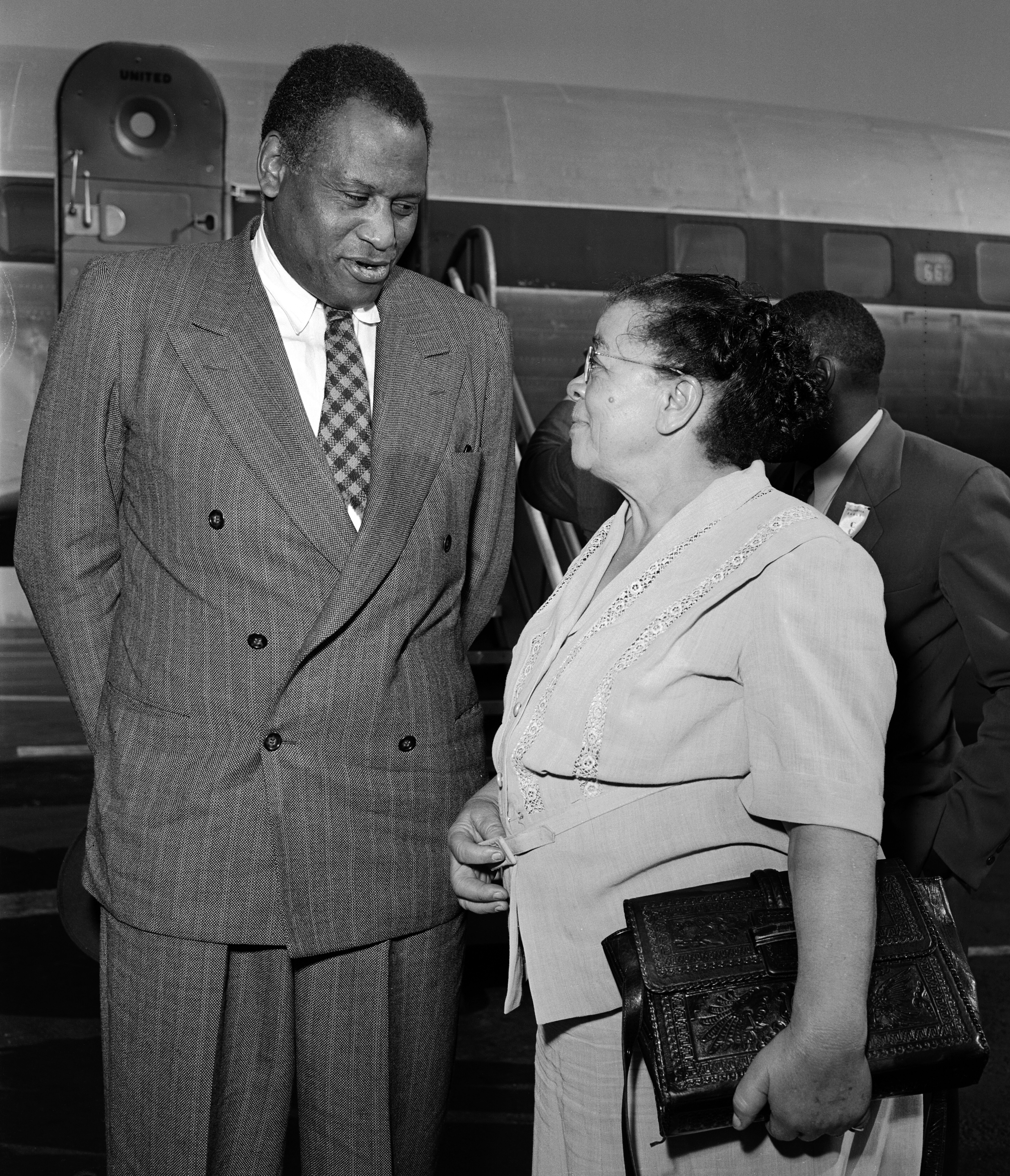
Bass and Paul Robeson, Los Angeles, 1949

Bass published the California Eagle from 1912 until 1951. Bass and her husband combated such issues as the derogatory images of African Americans in D. W. Griffith's film, The Birth of a Nation (released in 1915); Los Angeles' discriminatory hiring practices; the revival of the Ku Klux Klan; police brutality; and restrictive housing covenants. As she exposed the KKK, Bass received threatening phone calls. At one point she was confronted by eight men robed in white, whom she scared off after displaying a firearm. She was unsuccessfully sued for libel by Klan leader G.W. Price after Bass published a letter from the Klan which detailed its plans to exterminate black leaders.

The Basses championed the black soldiers of the Twenty-Fourth Infantry who were unjustly convicted and sentenced in the 1917 Houston race riot. They also later covered the case and supported the "Scottsboro Boys," nine young men who were framed and convicted of rape in Scottsboro, Alabama, in 1931.

In 1934, Joseph Bass died and Charlotta Bass assumed control of the paper. During this time period the California Eagle, along with other African-American presses, were under investigation by the Office of the Secretary of War, who viewed it as a threat to national security. They were suspicious of the Communist Party's attempts to build an alliance with African Americans by supporting their activism in civil rights.

Following US entry into World War II after the Japanese attack on Pearl Harbor, the Department of Justice interrogated Bass in 1942 over claims that the paper was funded by the Axis nations of Japan and Germany. The FBI continued to monitor Bass, as they deemed her actions advocating for the Communist Party despite a lack of evidence and Bass herself denying any assertions of the kind. In 1943, the Department of Justice was asked by the Post Office Department to revoke her mailing permit. The Post Office Department argued that the newspaper could not be mailed due to sensitive and illegal material within the paper. Bass again won the case, and the Department of Justice said her mailing permit would not be revoked.

Bass continued to use the paper as a way of raising awareness of various issues facing African-Americans and other minorities. For example, she wrote about restrictive covenants in housing. The United States Supreme Court found these to be unconstitutional in 1948.

Bass had no children, and she intended to pass on the paper to her nephew, John Kinloch, son of her sister Victorine Spears Kinloch. He lived with Bass in Los Angeles and worked as a reporter and editor for the California Eagle. He joined the military to serve in World War II; he was killed in Germany on April 3, 1945, in the last weeks of the war. His mother was his life insurance beneficiary, and when she died, the policy passed to Bass.

Bass continued to run the California Eagle on her own until selling it in 1951 and moving to New York City. There she focused on politics. In the postwar period, with the beginning of the Cold War between the US and the Soviet Union, her activism and political activities continued to arouse FBI and other official suspicions that she was a communist. She continued to deny this assertion.

== Political activities ==
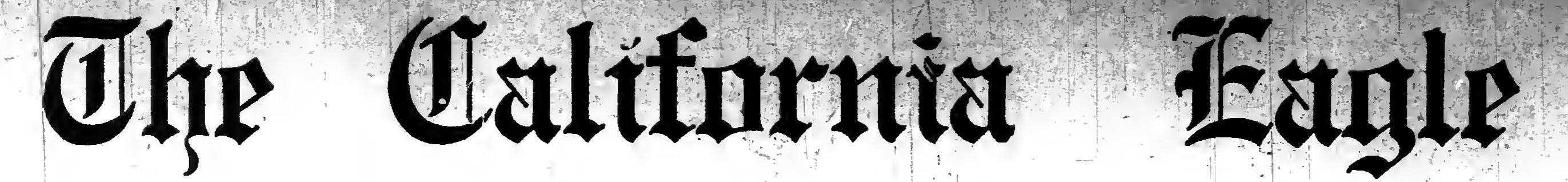
1916 Nameplate of California Eagle

During the 1920s, Bass became co-president of the Los Angeles chapter of the Universal Negro Improvement Association, founded by Marcus Garvey. Bass formed the Home Protective Association to defeat housing covenants in all-white neighborhoods. She helped found the Industrial Business Council, which fought discrimination in employment practices and encouraged black people to go into business. As editor and publisher of the California Eagle, the oldest black newspaper on the West Coast, Bass fought against restrictive covenants in housing and segregated schools in Los Angeles. She campaigned to end job discrimination at the Los Angeles General Hospital, the Los Angeles Rapid Transit Company, the Southern Telephone Company, and the Boulder Canyon Project.

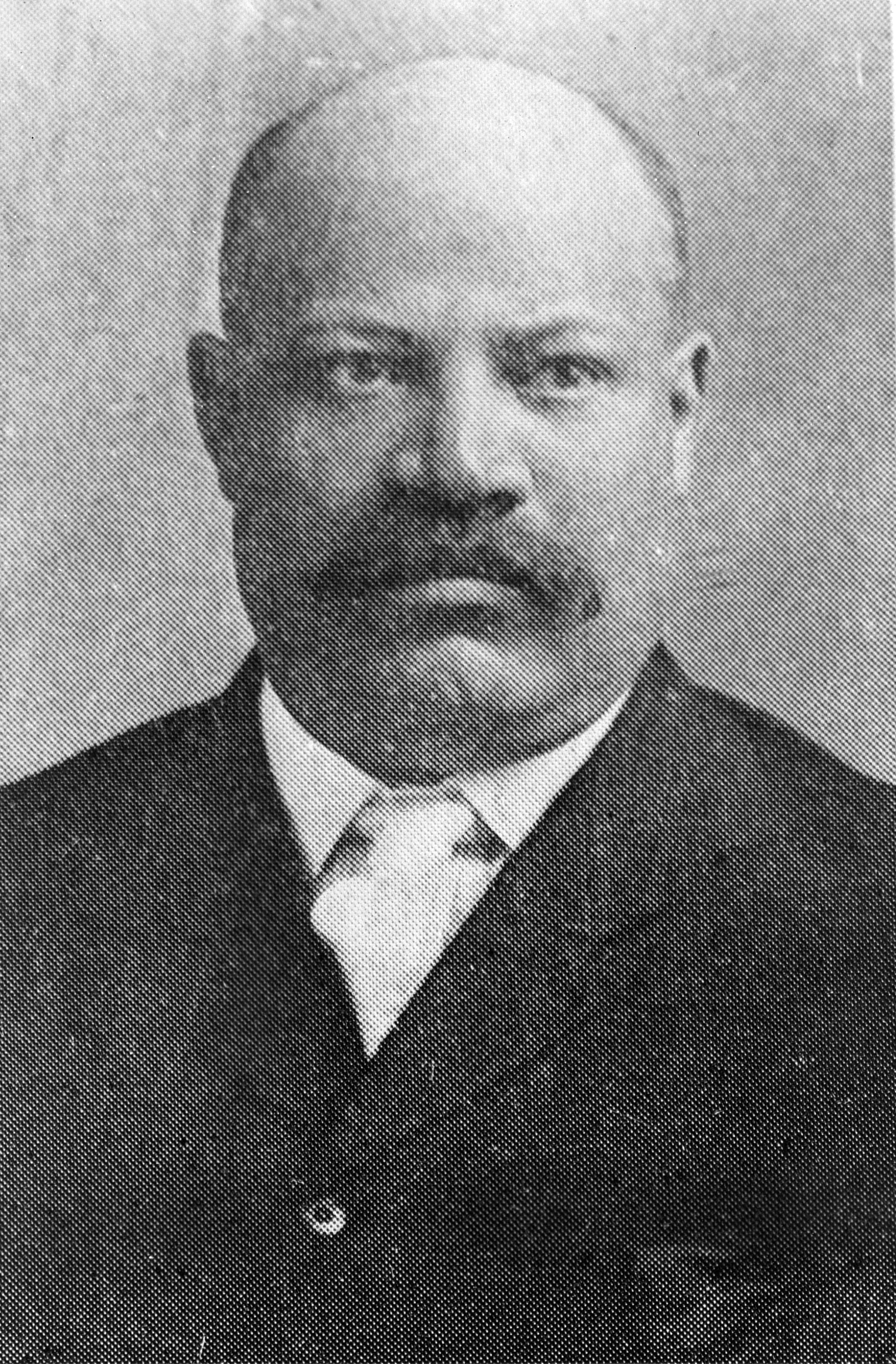
Joseph Blackburn Bass

During the Great Depression of the 1930s, she continued to encourage black businesses with the campaign known as "Don't Buy Where You Can't Work". A longtime Republican, she voted for President Franklin D. Roosevelt, a Democrat, in 1936.

As a leader of both the NAACP and the UNIA, Bass spanned the divide between integrationist and separatist black politics. She was the director of the Youth Movement of the NAACP. It had 200 members, including some actors and actresses, such as Lena Horne, Hattie McDaniel, and Louise Beavers.

In 1940, the Republican Party chose Bass as western regional director for Wendell Willkie's presidential campaign. Three years later, she became the first African-American grand jury member for the Los Angeles County Court. Also in 1943, Bass led a group of black leaders to the office of the Mayor of Los Angeles, Fletcher Bowron. They demanded an expansion of the Mayor's Committee on American Unity, more public mass meetings to promote interracial unity, and an end to the discriminatory hiring practices of the privately owned Los Angeles Railway Company. The mayor listened, but agreed to do no more than to expand his committee. Then later in the 1940s, Bass left the Republican Party and joined the Progressive Party because she believed neither of the major parties was committed to civil rights.

Bass also ran for the Los Angeles City Council in the 1940s using the song-title slogan “Don't Fence Me In” to highlight her condemnation of housing discrimination.

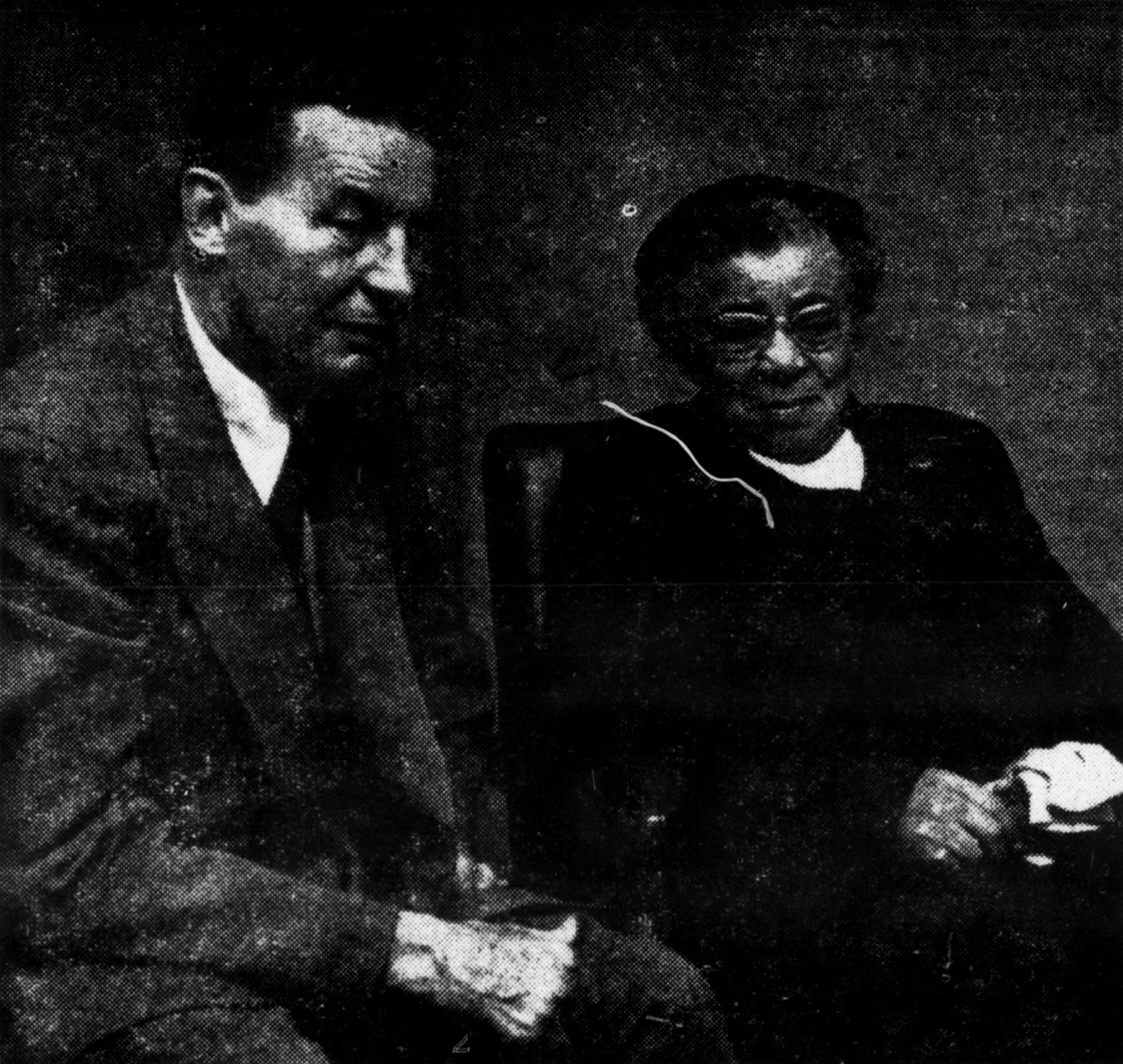
Bass with her running mate, Vincent Hallinan, 1952

Bass served in 1952 as the National Chairman of the Sojourners for Truth and Justice, an organization of black women set up to protest racial violence in the South. That year, she was nominated for vice president of the United States by the Progressive Party. She was the running mate of lawyer Vincent Hallinan. Bass became the first African-American woman to run for vice president of the United States. Her platform called for civil rights, women's rights, an end to the Korean War, and peace with the Soviet Union. Bass's slogan during the vice presidential campaign was, "Win or lose, we win by raising the issues." She was endorsed by Paul Robeson, W.E.B. DuBois and Ada B. Jackson in campaign material during her run. She began the campaign on her own as Hallinan served out a six-month contempt of court sentence arising from his legal defense of union leader Harry Bridges.

Bass worked on issues that also attracted Luisa Moreno, who was active in Afro-Chicano politics in Los Angeles during the 1930s-1950. No record shows that the two women ever met, but in 1943 both served on the Sleepy Lagoon Defense Committee, a multiracial group that fought for the release of several Chicanos convicted of murder by an all-white jury making Bass and Moreno part of the same "constellation" of struggle.

Bass wrote her last column for the California Eagle on April 26, 1951, and sold the paper soon after. Considering the sum of her career as she was completing her autobiography, Forty Years (1960), Bass wrote:

It has been a good life that I have had, through a very hard one, but I know the future will be even better, And as I think back I know that is the only kind of life: In serving one's fellow man one serves himself best ...

In 1966, Bass had a stroke and afterwards retired to a Los Angeles nursing home. In 1967, at age ninety-one the FBI still classified Charlotta Bass as a potential security threat.

During her years of retirement, she maintained a library in her garage for the young people in her neighborhood. It was a continuation of her long fight to give all people opportunities and education. She died in Los Angeles on April 12, 1969, from a cerebral hemorrhage. She is buried alongside her husband in Evergreen Cemetery, Boyle Heights, East Los Angeles, California. The grave marker only names her husband.

== Inter-racial political activities ==
Gaye Johnson's essay Constellations of Struggle (2008) examines Charlotta Bass and Luisa Moreno's significance on political activism and how it relates to the history of struggle communities of color have faced. Both Bass and Moreno shared a "mutual struggle" and were active in fighting for civil rights through organizations together and through their own pursuits. Bass primarily focused on the African American community and Luisa Moreno on the Chicano community but both supported a variety of civil rights. Both women were active in the Sleepy Lagoon Defense Committee, labor rights, and civil rights throughout their lives. Both women also used a technique of influencing one community at a time, employing antiracist activism, and bringing awareness.

Through the California Eagle, Bass was able to have readers recognize the struggles of communities of color. Even when Bass was faced with her own struggles with United States officials she used it as opportunities to further the influence of her paper. This can be seen after her detainment by United States officials caused her to miss her flight to China for a conference, where afterwards she continued to work on the next issue of the paper. Charlotta Bass was able to strengthen the community by pointing out the issues in Los Angeles, bringing the African American community together. With the strategy of one community at a time she was able to publicize the unequal treatment in a majority of issues from housing to police brutality. Through the newspaper she was able reverse the long used tactic of blaming people of color to shift the blame onto white officials who were responsible for the unequal treatment continued to be perpetuated in various areas such as housing and police brutality.

Gaye Johnson's book Spaces of Conflict, Sounds of Solidarity (2013) furthers this concept of "constellations of struggle" by looking at the "history of resistance" where communities have fought back and how they have reclaimed space. The work of Charlotta Bass and Luisa Moreno represents an interracial struggle and moments of solidarity. These moments of solidarity between African Americans and Mexicans was a way of reclaiming space through not only political means but through leisure spaces like music. When communities of color were violently attacked by whites it brought these communities together to further resist by unifying their forces together.

The California Eagle was utilized as a tool to change the communities ideology by challenging the police even comparing their tactics to Hitler's tactics, challenging the assumption criminal behavior was biological in people of color, and linked fascism to racism. The California Eagle was a way of reaching global attention to the issues of people of color. Charlotta Bass was able to promote the creation of "spatial entitlement" by bringing communities together through her work with organizations and the newspaper.

== Legacy ==
Bass is remembered for using the California Eagle as a platform for civil rights advocacy and for challenging discrimination in housing, employment, education and policing. As the newspaper's editor and publisher, she used the Black press to document conditions affecting African Americans and other marginalized communities in Los Angeles and to advocate for political and social reform.

Her political career also made her a national figure. In 1952, Bass became the first African American woman nominated for vice president of the United States, running with Vincent Hallinan on the Progressive Party ticket. Her journalism and political activism have subsequently been studied as part of the history of the Black press, civil-rights organizing and interracial political movements in twentieth-century Los Angeles.

In 2022, the USC Annenberg School for Communication and Journalism established the Charlotta Bass Journalism & Justice Lab in her honor. Founded by journalism scholar Allissa Richardson, the research and teaching center preserves and studies Black media and the work of journalists, activists and social-change figures, particularly in the western United States. The Root reported at the Lab's launch that it was named for Bass because of her role as a pioneering Black newspaper publisher and political figure and because its work was intended to carry forward her legacy of journalism and social advocacy.

The Lab has developed archival, oral-history and journalism projects inspired by Bass's use of media as a vehicle for social change. Its programs include the Second Draft Project, an interactive oral-history initiative that documents the experiences of Black Americans connected to major events in civil-rights and social-justice history. The Los Angeles Sentinel described the Lab's work as combining journalism, technology and the preservation of Black history while continuing Bass's commitment to journalism and social justice.

In 2023, Los Angeles City Councilmember Curren Price proclaimed February 14, Bass's birthday, as Charlotta Bass Day in Los Angeles. The Bass Lab subsequently made Charlotta Bass Day an annual public program at USC, using the observance to present journalism, oral-history and public-history projects connected to Black media and civil rights.

Preceded by Glen H. Taylor	Progressive Party nominee for Vice President of the United States; 1952	Succeeded by (None)
