= Willie Middlebrook =

English cricketer

Willie Middlebrook (23 May 1858 – 26 April 1919) was an English first-class cricketer, who played seventeen matches for Yorkshire County Cricket Club in 1888 and 1889. He also appeared for Lord Hawke's XI (1889) and Louis Hall's Yorkshire XI (1891) in other first-class games.

Middlebrook was born in Morley, West Yorkshire, and was a right arm fast bowler. He took 54 wickets in all matches at 19.83, with a best of 5 for 59 against Cambridge University, his only five wicket haul. He scored 96 runs at 4.36, with a best of 19 not out, also against Cambridge University. He also took 20 catches in the field.

He died in April 1919, at the age of 60, in Morley.
