= Danny Bakewell =

American civil rights activist and entrepreneur

Danny Joseph Bakewell (born 1946) is an American civil rights activist, real estate developer and media owner. He is the owner of The Bakewell Company, which includes among its holdings the Los Angeles Sentinel newspaper. He has also served as Chairman of the National Newspaper Publishers Association (NNPA).

== Early life and career ==
Bakewell was born and raised in New Orleans, moving out to Los Angeles in 1967.

Bakewell is the co-founder of the National Black United Fund. He also served as President of The Brotherhood Crusade, a civil rights advocate organization for the Black Los Angeles community, for over 30 years.

Bakewell supported O. J. Simpson during his 1995 trial.

Bakewell runs a real-estate development firm, The Bakewell Company, which is the largest minority-owned on the West Coast. He purchased the Los Angeles Sentinel, the city's oldest and largest Black newspaper, in 2004. In 2005, he started Taste of Soul, a one-day block party in South LA. In 2007, he purchased the New Orleans radio station WBOK. He later sold WBOK to a company owned partly by Wendell Pierce.

Bakewell also served as chairman of the National Newspaper Publishers Association.

Bakewell has been described as an informal power broker in Los Angeles.

In 2025, an intersection in South Los Angeles was named after him.

== Personal life ==
Bakewell and his wife Aline have two adult children and four grandchildren.

Bakewell is Catholic.
