= Harry Adams (photographer) =

American photographer (1918–1985)

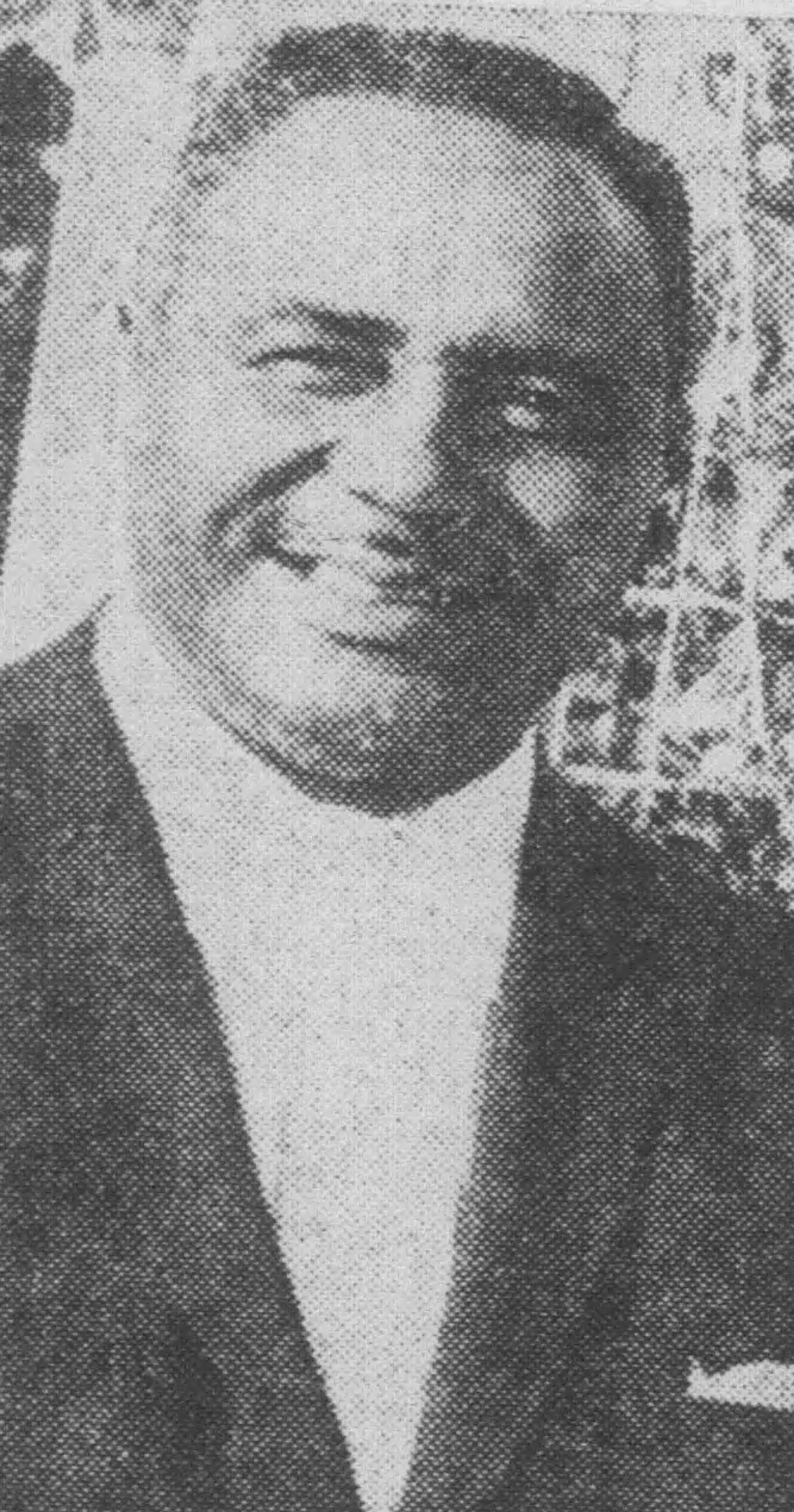
- Adams in 1964
- Born: 1918; Arkansas, U.S.
- Died: 1985 (aged 66–67)
- Education: Moler Barber College

Harry Holden Adams (1918 – 1985) was an African-American photographer who worked for the California Eagle and Los Angeles Sentinel.

== Life and education ==
Adams was born in Arkansas to Hunter Adams and Robbie Lee Evans Adams. The Adams family moved to Santa Ana, California, where they eventually helped establish Johnson Chapel African Methodist Episcopal Church.

Adams attended Santa Ana College, where he studied music and political science. He worked as a janitor for the Santa Ana Recreation and Park Department while attending Whittier College until he was drafted into the Army, serving as a military police officer and eventually sergeant until his discharge from Camp Harahan in 1946.

He moved to Los Angeles, where he graduated from Moler Barber College and became a security guard for the Los Angeles County Sheriff Department. Four years later, in 1950, he attended the California School of Photography and Graphic Design and the Fred Archer School of Photography, where he earned the nickname "One Shot Harry" for his quick work.

He later resigned from the Sheriff's Department to open a barbershop and studio at 4223 Avalon Blvd. He relocated it to 4300 South Central in 1971.

== Personal life ==
Adams married Marjorie Harris Adams in 1939 and had two children, a son, born that same year and a daughter, born in 1941. Adams and Harris divorced, and he married Lorraine Proctor in 1956. Adams died from a heart attack in 1985.

== Work ==
Adams' work was known for being "worklike and of-the-moment" but not dramatic or provocative. The Los Angeles Times said, "His photographs captured everyday life in the city's African-American community. His work also includes images of dignitaries such as Martin Luther King Jr., Malcolm X, a young Tom Bradley, former First Lady Eleanor Roosevelt and many others."

Adams' work was included in the 2025 exhibition Photography and the Black Arts Movement, 1955–1985 at the National Gallery of Art.

== Exhibitions ==
- Black Life: Images of Resistance and Resilience in Southern California. San Diego Museum of Art. August 24, 2019 – December 1, 2019.
- Identity and Affirmation: Post War African-American Photography. California State University, Northridge Art Gallery, Pacific Standard Time: Art in L.A., 1945–1980, September 1–December 10, 2011.
- Harry Adams: Camera & Community. California African American Museum, Los Angeles, California, March–May 1997.

== Collections ==
Photographic collections of Adams' work are held at Yale University and in the Tom and Ethel Bradley Center at California State University, Northridge.
