= The California Eagle =

African American newspaper in Los Angeles

California Eagle
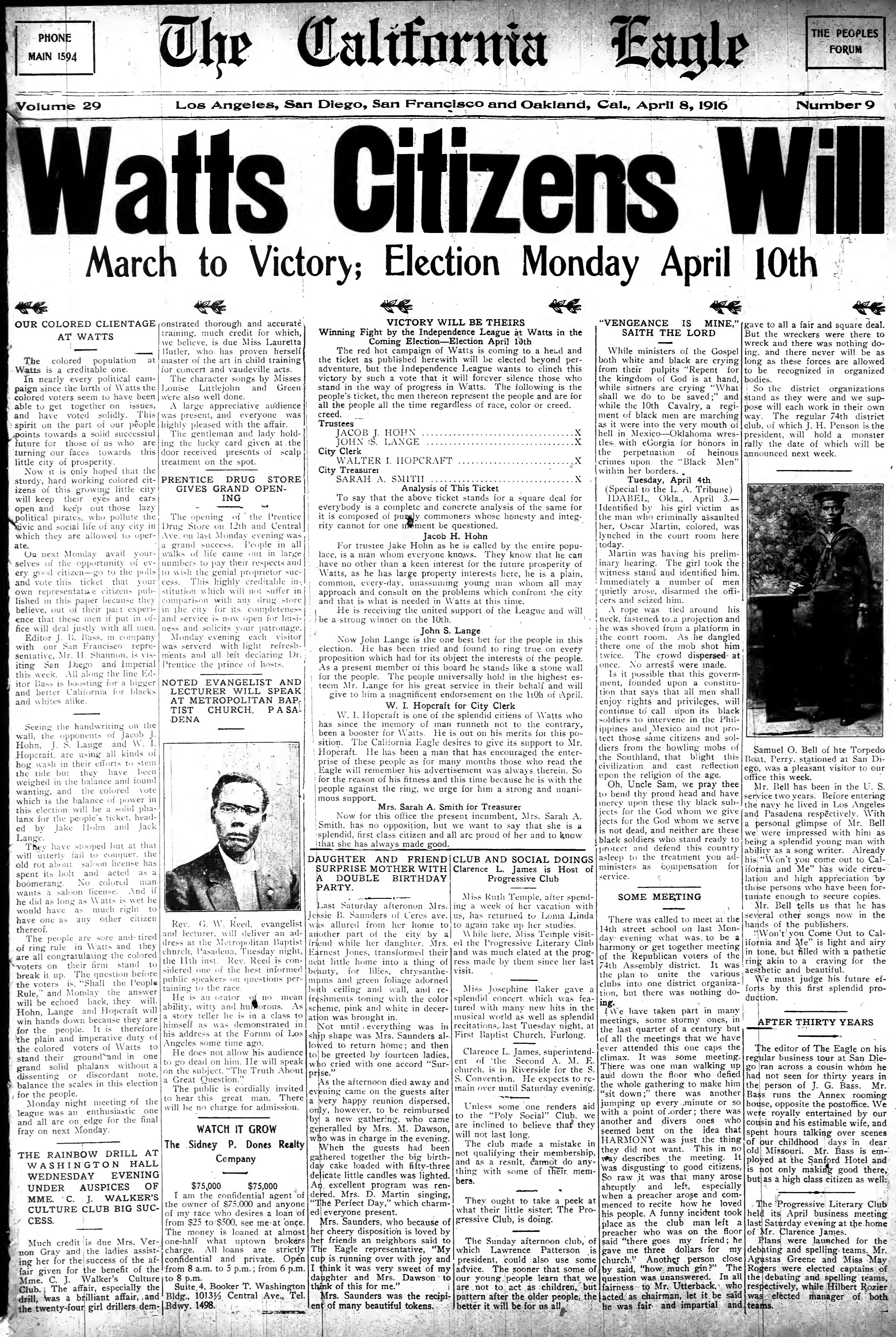
- Front page from 1916
- Type: Weekly newspaper
- Founder: John J. Neimore
- Founded: 1879
- Ceased publication: January 7, 1964
- City: Los Angeles, California
- Country: United States
- OCLC number: 9188894
- Free online archives: archive.org/details/caleagle

The California Eagle (1879–1964) was a newspaper in Los Angeles for African Americans. It was founded as The Owl in 1879 and later renamed Eagle by John J. Neimore. Charlotta Bass became the owner of the paper after Neimore's death in 1912. She owned and operated the paper, renamed the California Eagle, until 1951. Her husband, J. B. Bass, served as editor until his death in 1934. In the 1920s, they increased circulation to 60,000. Bass was also active as a civil rights campaigner in Los Angeles, working to end segregation in jobs, housing and transportation.

The newspaper was next owned for more than a decade by Loren Miller, who had been city editor. He also worked as a civil liberties lawyer and was a leader in the community. After he sold the paper in 1964 to accept an appointment as a judge of the Superior Court of the State of California [i.e., the trial courts] for Los Angeles County, the publication quickly lost ground, and closed that year.

== History ==
Neimore, a staunch Republican founded the newspaper as The Owl in 1879. After Neimore's death in 1912, Charlotta Bass bought the paper and renamed it California Eagle. Her husband, J.B. Bass, was editor until his death in 1934.

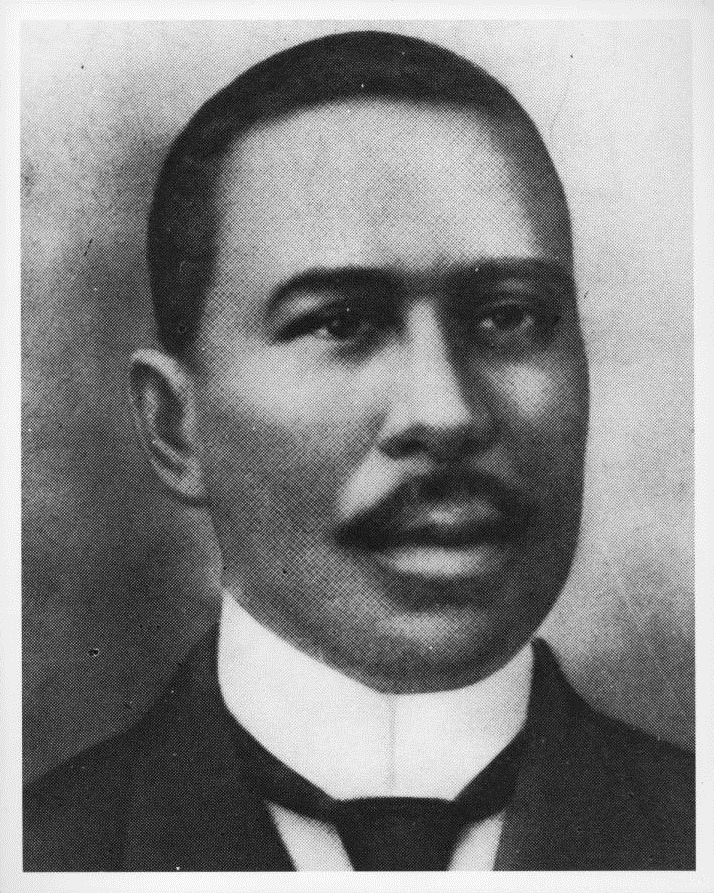
John J. Neimore, founder

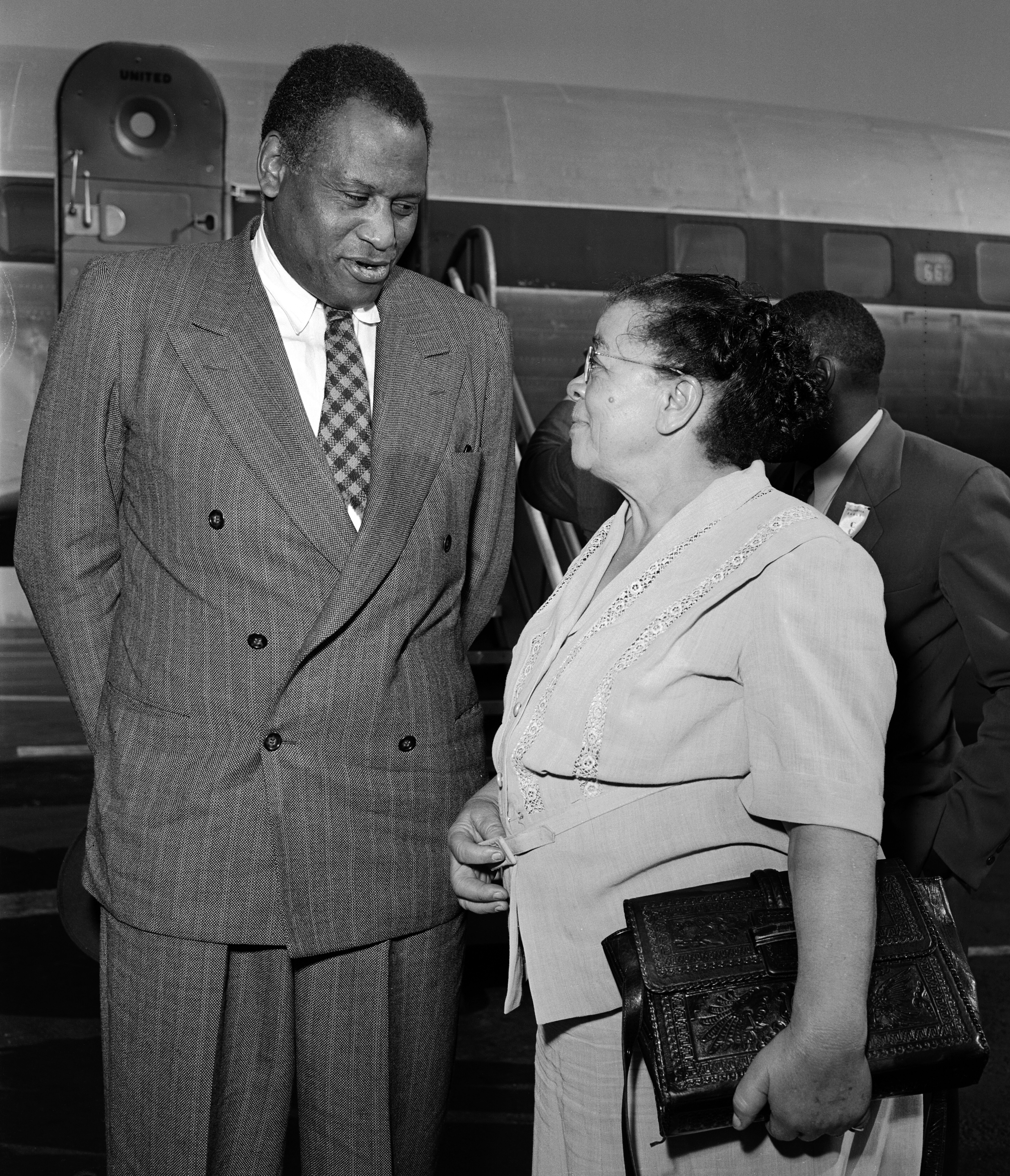
Paul Robeson and Charlotte Bass in Los Angeles, 1949

During the Great Migration, the paper offered information on employment and housing opportunities as well as news stories geared towards the newly arrived migrant population.

By 1925, the newspaper had a circulation of 60,000, the largest of any African-American newspaper in California. Its publishers and editors were active in civil rights, beginning with campaigns for equitable hiring, patronage of black businesses, and an end to segregated facilities and housing.

Bass retired in 1951 and sold the California Eagle to Loren Miller, the former city editor. Miller was a law graduate of Washburn University in Kansas. After he relocated to Los Angeles in 1930, he began writing for the Eagle and eventually became city editor. In 1945, Miller represented Hattie McDaniel and won her case against the "Sugar Hill" restrictive covenant case. He was appointed in 1963 as a judge of the Superior Court [i.e., the trial courts] for Los Angeles County by Governor Edmund "Pat" Brown. In 1963, Miller sold the paper to fourteen local investors in order to accept his appointment as judge. The California Eagle initially increased circulation from 3,000 to 21,000. But within six months the paper had to close; on January 7, 1964, the California Eagle ceased publication after 85 years.

== Platform ==
The California Eagle had the following platform:

- hiring of Negroes as a matter of right, rather than as a concession, in those institutions where their patronage creates a demand for labor;
- increased participation of Negroes in municipal, state, and national government;
- the abolition of enforced segregation and all other artificial barriers to the recognition of true merit;
- patronizing of Negroes by Negroes as a matter of principle;
- more rapid development of those communities in which Negroes live, by cooperation between citizens and those who have business investments in such communities; and
- enthusiastic support for a greater degree of service at the hands of all social, civic, charitable, and religious institutions

== Staff ==
Employees and contributors at The California Eagle in 1957 included:

- Francis Philip Waller Jr., advertising and circulation
- Abie Robinson, city reporting and general news
- Roy Smith, sports reporting
- Calme Russ, office management
- Maggie Hathaway, society reporting and civic/church matters
- Anthony Funches, copy boy, cleaning, circulation/distribution

The offices were located at 4071-4075 South Central Avenue.

== Notable people ==
Several newspaper employees went on to become prominent figures in their own right including:

- T.R.M. Howard: From 1933 to 1935, Howard, then a medical student at Loma Linda University, was the circulation manager. He wrote a regular column entitled "The Negro in the Light of History" (later changed to "Our Fight"). After medical school Howard returned to Mississippi where he became a doctor. By the 1940s and 1950s, he had become one of the wealthiest and most influential Blacks in the state and was a leading civil rights leader. He was later a mentor of Medgar Evers and Fannie Lou Hamer. He played a key role in finding evidence and witnesses in the Emmett Till murder case.
- Robert C. Farrell (born 1936): journalist and member of the Los Angeles City Council, 1974–91
- Vera Jackson (1912–1999), freelance and later staff photographer.
- Jessie Mae Beavers She was Family Section editor of the paper. Later became Family Editor of the Los Angeles Sentinel for 40 years until her death in 1989.
- Adolphus D. Griffin (1868–1916), newspaper editor and publisher in the Pacific Northwest (Portland New Age), California (California Eagle), and Kansas (Topeka Plaindealer) who focused on African-American causes.
