= James W. Tankard Jr. =

James William Tankard Jr. (June 20, 1941 – August 12, 2005), communication scholar, author of The Statistical Pioneers and coauthor of Communication Theories: Origins, Methods, Uses (issued in five editions and translated into six languages).

== Academic career and degrees ==
At the time of his death, Tankard was professor emeritus in the School of Journalism at the University of Texas at Austin, where he served on the faculty for 32 years and held the Jesse H. Jones Professorship in Journalism. Prior to joining the Texas faculty in 1972, he served on the journalism faculties of Temple University and the University of Wisconsin - Madison.

Tankard earned a general science B.S. from Virginia Polytechnic Institute and an M.A. in journalism from the University of North Carolina at Chapel Hill. After working for the Associated Press and the Raleigh Times, he earned his Ph.D. from Stanford University with a dissertation on eye contact as a communication channel.

== Academic publications ==
During his years in academia, Tankard authored or co-authored six books and more than fifty research articles and book chapters. His six books reflect the breadth of his interests and contributions:

- Michael Ryan and James W. Tankard Jr., Basic News Reporting Palo Alto, Calif.: Mayfield, 1977.
- James W. Tankard Jr., The Statistical Pioneers Cambridge, MA: Schenkman Books, 1984.
- T.M. Pasqua, J.K. Buckalew, R.E. Rayfield and James W. Tankard Jr., Mass Media in the Information Age Englewood Cliffs, NJ: Prentice Hall, 1990.
- Werner J. Severin and James W. Tankard Jr., Communication Theories: Origins, Methods, and Uses in the Mass Media 5th ed. New York: Addison Wesley Longman, 2001.
- Pamela J. Shoemaker, James William Tankard Jr., Dominic L. Lasorsa, How To Build Social Science Theories Thousand Oaks, Calif.: Sage, 2004.
- Michael Ryan and James W. Tankard Jr., Writing for Print and Digital Media New York: McGraw-Hill: 2005.

Tankard also served as the editor of Journalism Monographs from 1988 to 1994.

== Posthumous honors ==
The Association for Education in Journalism and Mass Communication (AEJMC), the national association of journalism and mass communication scholars and media professionals to which Tankard devoted much of his professional life, posthumously honored him as the 2006 recipient of the Eleanor Blum Distinguished Service to Research Award. This award, created in 1980 to recognize a person who has devoted a substantial part of his or her career to promoting research in mass communication, is so selective that it has only been given ten times during the past 25 years.

AEJMC's board of directors also established the James W. Tankard Jr. Book Award, an annual book competition, to honor him and recognize books published by AEJMC members. The winner of the inaugural (2007) Tankard Book Award was The African American Newspaper: Voice of Freedom, by Patrick S. Washburn and published by Northwestern University Press.
