= Los Angeles Sentinel =

Weekly African-American newspaper in Los Angeles, California

- Type: Weekly newspaper
- Format: Broadsheet
- Owner: Independent
- Founder: Leon H. Washington Jr.
- Publisher: Danny J. Bakewell
- Founded: 1933; 93 years ago
- Headquarters: 3800 S. Crenshaw Blvd; Los Angeles, California 90008; United States
- Website: lasentinel.net

The Los Angeles Sentinel is a weekly African-American owned newspaper published in Los Angeles, California. The paper boasted of reaching 125,000 readers as of 2004, making it one of the oldest, largest and most influential African-American newspapers in the Western United States. The Sentinel was also noted for their coverage of the changing African-American daily life experience in the post-1992 Los Angeles Riots era.

The Sentinel was founded in 1933 by Leon H. Washington Jr. for Black readers. Since that time, the newspaper has been considered a staple of Black life in Los Angeles. The paper mainly focuses on and thus enjoys most of its circulation in the predominantly African-American neighborhoods of South Los Angeles, Inglewood and Compton. The office is on Crenshaw Boulevard with commercial corridor in the Hyde Park neighborhood which is known as "the heart of African American commerce in Los Angeles".

On March 17, 2004, the Sentinel was purchased and came under the direction of real estate developer and community activist Danny Bakewell. He planned to provide the diversity of thought that exists among African Americans with opinion columns and editorials. He also wanted to cover business and reach young people.

== Notable people ==
- Larry Aubry, columnist, activist, known as the "conscience of Black LA"
- David Glenn Brown (born 1954) award-winning political cartoonist, educator and publisher. NAACP Image Award 2009. Sentinel political cartoonist 2003–present
- Robert C. Farrell (born 1936), journalist and member of the Los Angeles City Council, 1974–91
- Gertrude Gipson, editor and columnist
- Booker Griffin, columnist
- Patricia "Pat" Newman (1935–1981) journalist, hostess of Pat's Points Sunday morning talk show, community activist, feminist.
- Brad Pye Jr. (born 1931), sports and managing editor city editor, columnist (Prying Pye), radio sports broadcast journalist.
