= Topeka Plaindealer =

African American newspaper in Kansas, US

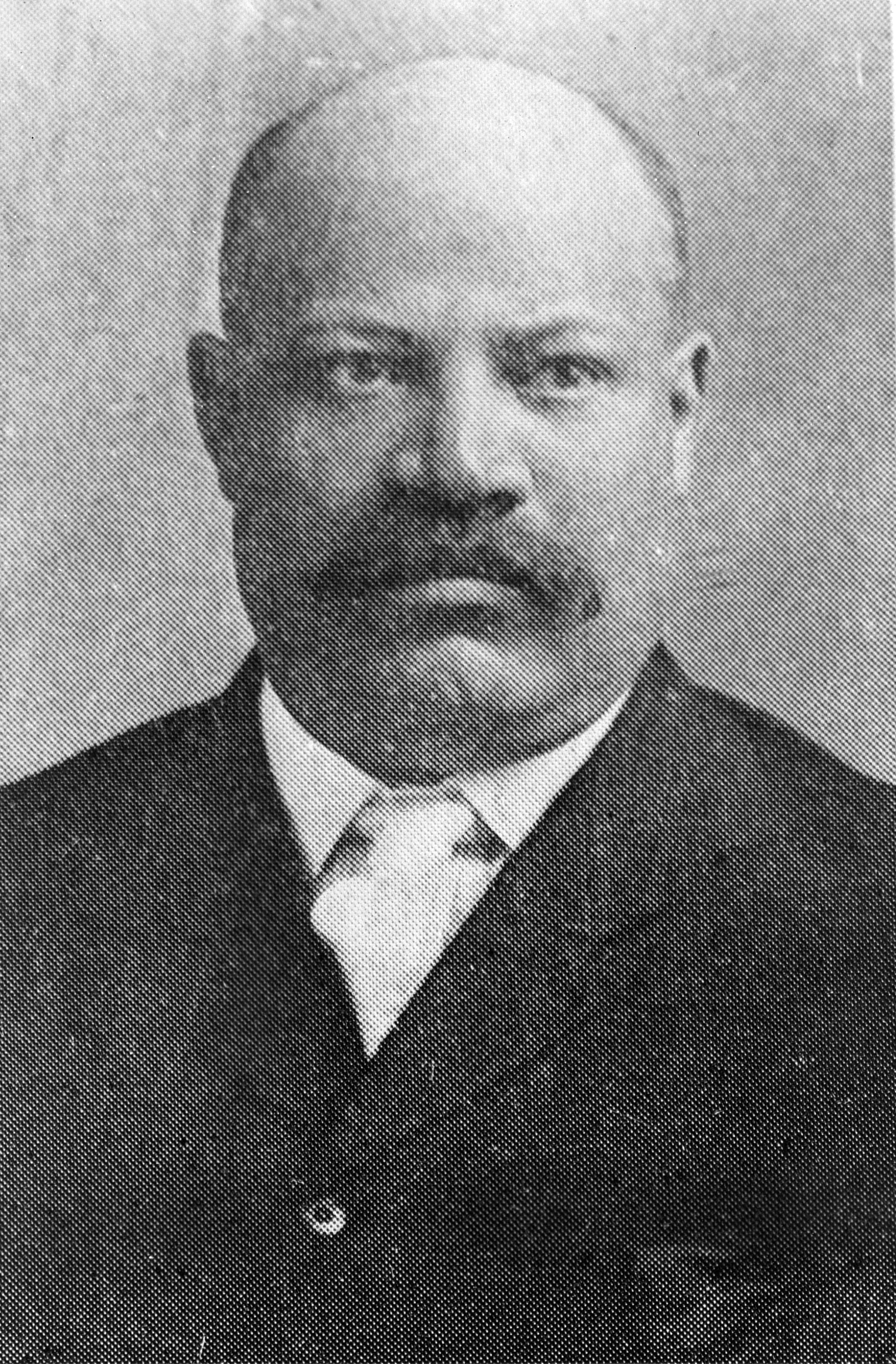
Joseph Blackburn Bass

Nick Chiles

The Topeka Plaindealer was a newspaper in Topeka, Kansas serving its African American community. It was founded as the Topeka Call by Will Pope. Joseph Blackburn Bass worked at it. It was purchased in 1899 by Nick Chiles who continued as its editor and publisher during his lifetime. He died in 1929, and his daughter Thelma Chiles Taylor became the paper's owner and editor. The paper continued until 1958. According to a historian reporting in the Topeka Capital-Journal it became the bestselling African American newspaper west of the Mississippi River.

== See also ==
- List of African-American newspapers and media outlets
- African American newspapers
