= Tropical Bowl =

Tropical Bowl is the name of two unrelated college football bowl games from different eras:

- Tropical Bowl (HBCUs), played in Jacksonville, Florida, during December from 1951 to 1953
- Tropical Bowl (all-star game), played in Florida during January since 2016
