= Etta Moten Barnett =

American singer, actress, activist (1901–2004)

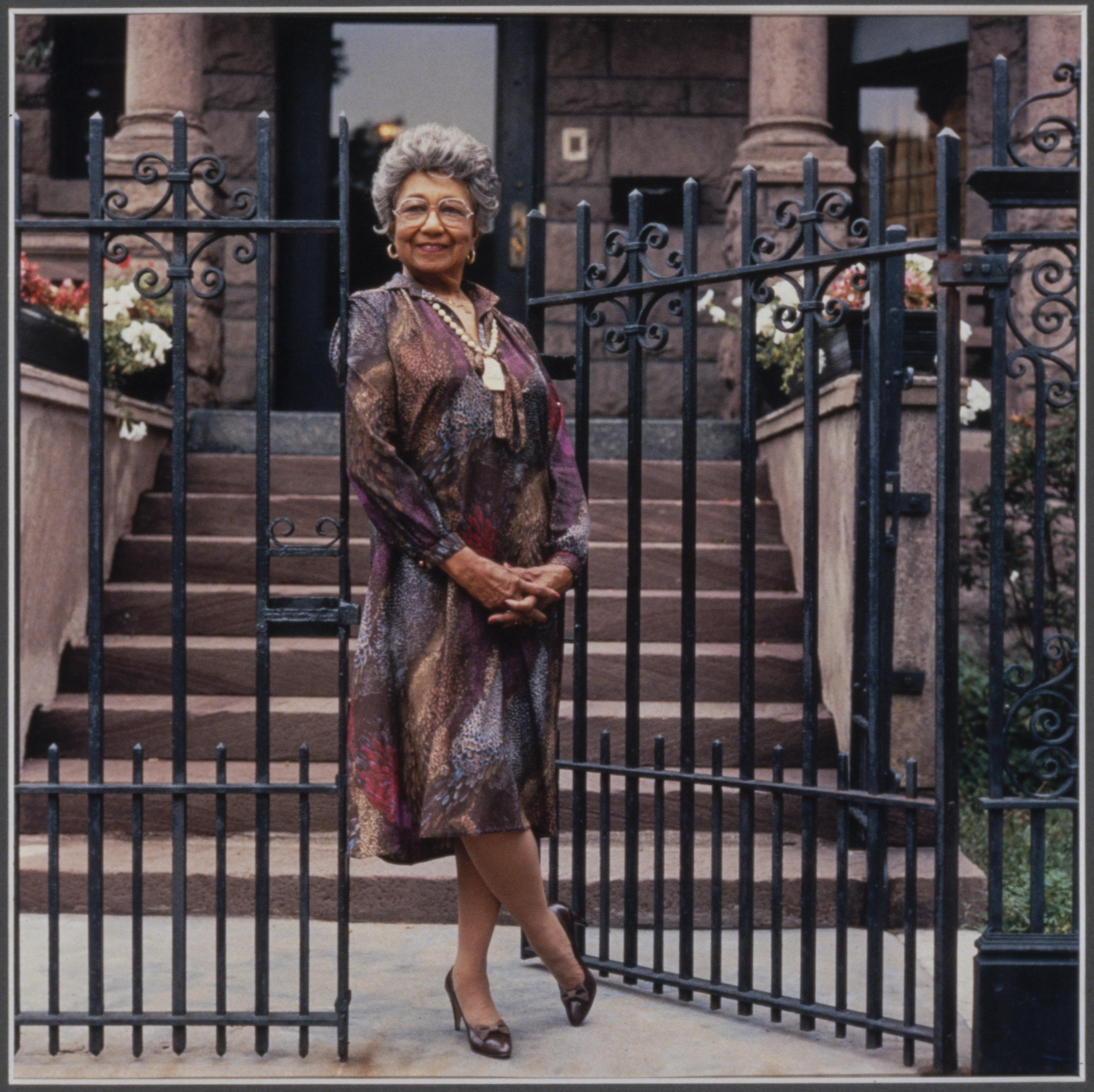
- Born: November 5, 1901; Weimar, Texas, U.S.
- Died: January 2, 2004 (aged 102); Chicago, Illinois, U.S.
- Occupations: Actress, singer, U.S. cultural representative in Africa
- Years active: 1929–1952
- Spouses: Curtis Brooks (m. c. 1918; div. 1924); Claude Albert Barnett (m. 1934; died 1967)
- Children: 3

Etta Moten Barnett (November 5, 1901 – January 2, 2004) was an American actress and contralto vocalist, who was identified with her signature role of "Bess" in Porgy and Bess. She created new roles for African-American women on stage and screen. After her performing career, Barnett was active in Chicago as a major philanthropist and civic activist, raising funds for and supporting cultural, social, and church institutions. She also hosted a radio program in Chicago and represented the United States in several official delegations to nations in Africa.

== Life and career ==
=== Early years ===
Etta Moten was born in Weimar, Texas, the only child of a Methodist minister, Rev. Freeman F. Moten, and a teacher, his wife, Ida Norman Moten. She started singing as a child in the church choir.

Moten's family put great importance on education, as her parents made sure she was enrolled in good schools no matter where they moved. Moten attended Paul Quinn College's secondary school in Waco, Texas. She then attended Western University, a historically black college (HBCU) in Quindaro, Kansas, where she studied music. To pay her tuition, she joined a quartet on Topeka's WREN radio, performed on the Chautauqua circuit, and spent summers with the Jackson Jubilee Singers. She completed her education at the University of Kansas, where she earned a B.A. in voice and drama in 1931. She became the first student to present a recital in the campus's newly constructed Hoch Auditorium. Moten became a member of Alpha Kappa Alpha sorority.

=== Career ===
Moten Barnett's first job began at Lincoln University. She received a teaching contract, which was short-lived when her father informed her that she would be moving to New York. Moten moved to New York City, where she first performed as a soloist with the Eva Jessye Choir. Jessye was a groundbreaking collaborator with Virgil Thomson and George Gershwin. In 1931, she performed in Fast and Furious, a musical revue written by Zora Neale Hurston. Moten was cast in the Broadway show Zombie.

She performed in two musical films released in 1933: Flying Down to Rio (singing "The Carioca") and a more substantial role as a war widow in the Busby Berkeley musical Gold Diggers of 1933 (singing the emotive "My Forgotten Man" with Joan Blondell). Also in 1933, she dubbed the singing of Theresa Harris in Professional Sweetheart.

Up until this point, the representation of black women in movies was limited to maids or nannies (the Mammy archetype). Moten made a breakthrough with her roles in these movies and is generally recognized as the first black woman to do so.

On January 31, 1934, Moten became the first African American to perform at the White House in the 20th century, the first in over 50 years since Marie Selika Williams performed for President Rutherford B. Hayes and First Lady Lucy Webb Hayes in 1878. Moten performed "The Forgotten Man" from her movie Gold Diggers of 1933 for President Franklin Delano Roosevelt at his birthday celebration. The song echoed Roosevelt's campaign promise that he would remember the "forgotten man".

Moten Barnett crossed over decades before that music-industry phrase existed. Disturbed by subtle but persistent racial discrimination, she persevered, believing she had to be "twice as good to get anywhere at all".

Gershwin discussed her singing the part of Bess in his new work Porgy and Bess, which he had written with her in mind. She was concerned about trying a role above her natural range of contralto. In the 1942 revival, the part of Bess was rewritten. She did accept the role of Bess, but she would not sing the word "nigger", which Ira Gershwin subsequently removed from the libretto. Through her performances on Broadway and with the national touring company until 1945, she captured Bess as her signature role.

She stopped performing in 1952 owing to vocal problems after doctors found a cyst on her vocal cords that required surgery. After her husband, Claude Barnett, died in 1967, she lived in Chicago, where she became active in the National Council of Negro Women, the Chicago Lyric Opera, and the Field Museum. She was also active in the DuSable Museum and the South Side Community Art Center.

In addition to activities with civic organizations, Moten Barnett served as a board member of both The Links, a service organization for African-American women, and her sorority, Alpha Kappa Alpha. She was also active in International Women's Year activities and events in the 1980s.

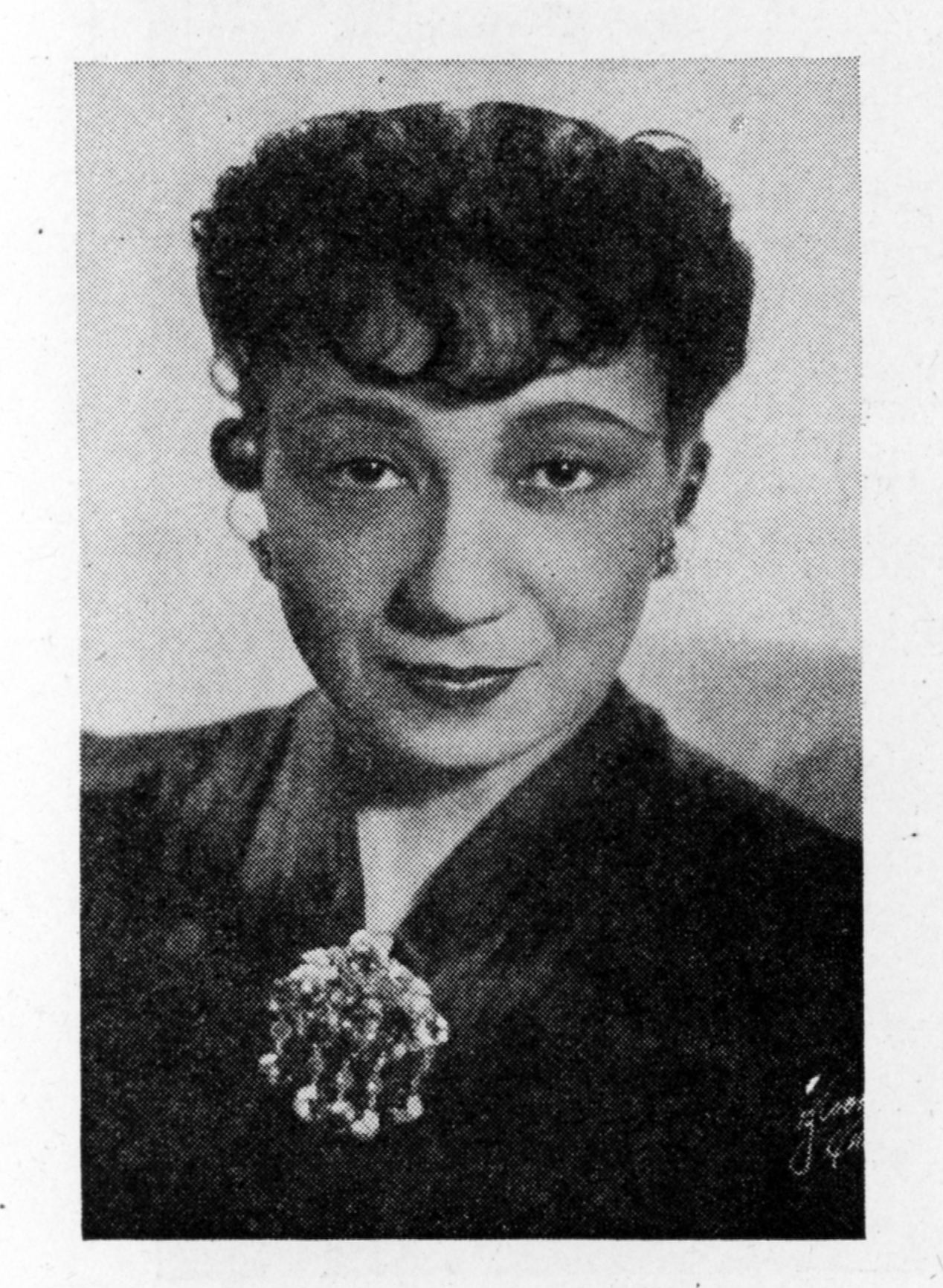
Moten Barnett in 1936

== Cultural missions ==
In the 1950s and 1960s, Moten Barnett hosted a radio show in Chicago called I Remember When. Dozens of recordings of I Remember When are available at the Library of Congress and the Schomburg Library in New York City. According to historian Angela Tate, Moten Barnett's program, which covered a wide range of cultural issues, was perhaps the first "Black woman’s radio broadcast created for Black listeners that also had a broader audience."

The United States government appointed her to be a representative on cultural missions to ten African nations. Etta's marriage to Claude Barnett allowed her to travel to Africa. Claude, as the head of the Associated Negro Press, along with Etta and other members of the organization visited the continent frequently to gain African news information for the ANP to include in their issues. On March 6, 1957, Moten Barnett interviewed Dr. Martin Luther King Jr. in Accra, Ghana, where they were both attending the celebration of Ghana's independence from Great Britain—she as the wife of Claude Barnett, a prominent member of the official U.S. delegation headed by Vice President Richard Nixon, and King, fresh from the Montgomery Bus Boycott, as a man interested in the liberation of oppressed people globally, but with no official place in Ghana's Independence Day festivities. The recording of this conversation, conducted in a Ghanaian radio studio where Moten Barnett was gathering recordings for her Chicago broadcasts, is also available at the Library of Congress and the Schomburg Library.

== Personal life ==
About 1918, she married Curtis Brooks, who had been a teacher of hers in high school. They had three daughters: Sue, Gladys, and Etta Vee, but divorced after six years of marriage.

In 1934, while living and working in New York, Moten married a second time, to Claude Albert Barnett, the head of the Associated Negro Press in Chicago. The two were happily married for 33 years, until he died in 1967.

Etta Moten Barnett died of pancreatic cancer at Chicago's Mercy Hospital in 2004, aged 102.

== Legacy and honors ==
- 1943 – University of Kansas, citation of merit
- 1958 – National Association of Business and Professional Women, citation for service
- 1973 – African Center of Atlanta University, citation for contributions to Afro-American music
- 1974 – WAIT, citation for contributions to the City of Chicago
- 1979 – Inducted into Black Filmmakers Hall of Fame, noted as: Actress, Concert Artist
- 1983 – Candace Award from the National Coalition of 100 Black Women
- 1988 – African American Institute citation for service to Africa
- 1993 – Order of Lincoln from the State of Illinois
- 2001 – Inducted into the Emily Taylor Center for Women and Gender Equity, University of Kansas

=== Honoris causa degrees ===
- 1976 – Atlanta University
- 1983 – Spelman College
- 1987 – University of Illinois
- 1989 – Lincoln University (Pennsylvania)
- 1989 – North Carolina Central University

== Work ==
=== Stage ===
- Fast and Furious, musical revue (1931)
- Zombie, a play (1932)
- Porgy and Bess, musical revival (1943)
- Lysistrata, Aristophanes' comedy, with an all-black cast (1946)

=== Filmography ===
- Ladies They Talk About (1933) as Singing Inmate (voice, uncredited)
- Gold Diggers of 1933 (1933) as "Remember My Forgotten Man" Singer (uncredited)
- Bombshell (1933) as Singer (scenes deleted)
- Flying Down to Rio (1933) as The Colored Singer
- Professional Sweetheart (1933) (dubbed singing voice for Theresa Harris)
- Operator 13 (1934) as Slave at Medicine Show (uncredited)
- The Green Pastures (1936) as Angel (uncredited)
- A Day at the Races (1937) as Black Singer (uncredited)
- Born to Sing (1942) as Soloist – "Ballad for Americans" (uncredited) (final film role)
