= 1951 Southern Jaguars football team =

American college football season

1951 Southern Jaguars football
- Conference: Southwestern Athletic Conference
- Record: 5–4–2 (4–1–2 SWAC)
- Head coach: Ace Mumford (16th season)
- Home stadium: Memorial Stadium

1951 Southwestern Athletic Conference football standings
	Conf.					Overall
Team	W		L		T	W		L		T
No. 4 Prairie View A&M $	6	–	1	–	0	9	–	1	–	0
No. 17 Texas College	4	–	1	–	2	5	–	3	–	2
No. 21 Southern	4	–	1	–	2	5	–	4	–	2
No. 20 Arkansas AM&N	4	–	2	–	1	5	–	4	–	1
Langston	4	–	3	–	0	4	–	5	–	0
Wiley	2	–	4	–	1	3	–	5	–	1
Samuel Huston	1	–	6	–	0	1	–	8	–	0
Bishop	0	–	7	–	0	0	–	9	–	0
$ – Conference champion; Rankings from Associated Negro Press

The 1951 Southern Jaguars football team represented Southern University as a member of the Southwestern Athletic Conference (SWAC) during the 1951 college football season. In their 16th season under head coach Ace Mumford, the Jaguars compiled an overall record of 5–4–2 with a mark of 4–1–2 in conference play, tying for second place in the SWAC.

== Schedule ==
Date	Time	Opponent	Site	Result	Attendance	Source
September 22		Texas Southern*	Baton Rouge, LA	W 25–0		
September 29		Alcorn A&M*	Memorial Stadium; Baton Rouge, LA	L 13–19	6,000–8,500	
October 6	8:15 p.m.	at Samuel Huston	Anderson High Stadium; Austin, TX	W 67–0		
October 13	8:00 p.m.	Arkansas AM&N	Memorial Stadium; Baton Rouge, LA	T 7–7		
October 20	2:00 p.m.	at Langston	Anderson Field; Langston, OK	L 2–6		
October 27		Texas College	Baton Rouge, LA	T 7–7	3,000	
November 3		vs. Bishop	Longview, TX	W 42–0		
November 10		Wiley^{†}	Memorial Stadium; Baton Rouge, LA	W 24–21		
November 17	1:30 p.m.	at Florida A&M*	Bragg Stadium; Tallahassee, FL	L 6–36	6,000	
November 24	8:00 p.m.	Prairie View A&M	Memorial Stadium; Baton Rouge, LA	W 13–0		
December 1		at Xavier (LA)*	Xavier Stadium; New Orleans, LA (Pelican State Classic)	L 8–22	12,000	
*Non-conference game; ^{†}Homecoming; All times are in Central time
