= 1951 Langston Lions football team =

American college football season

1951 Langston Lions football
- Conference: Southwestern Athletic Conference
- Record: 4–5 (4–3 SWAC)
- Head coach: Caesar Felton Gayles (21st season)
- Home stadium: Anderson Field

1951 Southwestern Athletic Conference football standings
	Conf.					Overall
Team	W		L		T	W		L		T
No. 4 Prairie View A&M $	6	–	1	–	0	9	–	1	–	0
No. 17 Texas College	4	–	1	–	2	5	–	3	–	2
No. 21 Southern	4	–	1	–	2	5	–	4	–	2
No. 20 Arkansas AM&N	4	–	2	–	1	5	–	4	–	1
Langston	4	–	3	–	0	4	–	5	–	0
Wiley	2	–	4	–	1	3	–	5	–	1
Samuel Huston	1	–	6	–	0	1	–	8	–	0
Bishop	0	–	7	–	0	0	–	9	–	0
$ – Conference champion; Rankings from Associated Negro Press

The 1951 Langston Lions football team represented Langston University as a member of the Southwestern Athletic Conference (SWAC) during the 1951 college football season. In their 21st season under head coach Caesar Felton Gayles, the Lions compiled an overall record of 4–5 with a mark of 4–3 in conference play, placing fifth in the SWAC.

== Schedule ==
Date	Time	Opponent	Site	Result	Attendance	Source
September 22		at Bishop	Marshall, TX	W 12–0		
September 29	2:00 p.m.	Tennessee A&I*	Anderson Field; Langston, OK	L 2–28	3,000	
October 6		at Lincoln (MO)*	Lincoln Field; Jefferson City, MO	L 0–19		
October 13	8:00 p.m.	vs. Texas College	Dal-Hi Stadium; Dallas, TX (Texhoma Classic)	L 18–19	7,000	
October 20	2:00 p.m.	Southern	Anderson Field; Langston, OK	W 6–2		
October 29		vs. Samuel Huston	San Antonio, TX	W 18–0		
November 3		Wiley	Langston, OK	W 7–2	5,000	
November 10		at Arkansas AM&N	Pumphrey Stadium; Pine Bluff, AR	L 18–19	3,500	
November 17		at Prairie View A&M	Blackshear Field; Prairie View, TX	L 0–25	10,000	
*Non-conference game; All times are in Central time
