= 1951 Bishop Tigers football team =

American college football season

1951 Bishop Tigers football
- Conference: Southwestern Athletic Conference
- Record: 0–9 (0–7 SWAC)
- Head coach: Leo S. Brinkley (1st season)
- Home stadium: Tiger Field

1951 Southwestern Athletic Conference football standings
	Conf.					Overall
Team	W		L		T	W		L		T
No. 4 Prairie View A&M $	6	–	1	–	0	9	–	1	–	0
No. 17 Texas College	4	–	1	–	2	5	–	3	–	2
No. 21 Southern	4	–	1	–	2	5	–	4	–	2
No. 20 Arkansas AM&N	4	–	2	–	1	5	–	4	–	1
Langston	4	–	3	–	0	4	–	5	–	0
Wiley	2	–	4	–	1	3	–	5	–	1
Samuel Huston	1	–	6	–	0	1	–	8	–	0
Bishop	0	–	7	–	0	0	–	9	–	0
$ – Conference champion; Rankings from Associated Negro Press

The 1951 Bishop Tigers football team represented Bishop College as a member of the Southwestern Athletic Conference (SWAC) during the 1951 college football season. In their first and only season under head coach Leo S. Brinkley, the Tigers compiled an overall record of 0–9 with a mark of 0–7 in conference play, placing last out of eight teams in the SWAC.

== Schedule ==
Date	Time	Opponent	Site	Result	Attendance	Source
September 22		Langston	Marshall, TX	L 0–12		
September 29		vs. Prairie View A&M	Port Arthur, TX	L 0–72	4,500	
October 13		Samuel Huston		L 6–13		
October 20	2:15 p.m.	Arkansas AM&N^{†}	Tiger Field; Marshall, TX	L 0–37	5,000	
October 27	2:00 p.m.	at Wiley	Wiley Stadium; Marshall, TX	L 0–14		
November 3		vs. Southern	Longview, TX	L 0–42		
November 10	2:30 p.m.	at Texas College	Steer Stadium; Tyler, TX	L 0–63		
November 24		vs. Texas Southern*	Farrington Field; Fort Worth, TX	L 0–46	900	
December 1	8:00 p.m.	vs. Grambling*	State Fair Stadium; Shreveport, LA	L 0–52 or 0–56		
*Non-conference game; ^{†}Homecoming; All times are in Central time
