= 1951 Morris Brown Wolverines football team =

American college football season

1951 Morris Brown Wolverines football

Black college national champion SIAC champion

Tropical Bowl, W 21–0 vs. Alcorn A&M
- Conference: Southern Intercollegiate Athletic Conference
- Record: 10–1 (8–0 SIAC)
- Head coach: Edward Clemons (2nd season)
- Home stadium: Herndon Stadium

1951 Southern Intercollegiate Athletic Conference football standings
	Conf.					Overall
Team	W		L		T	W		L		T
No. 2 Morris Brown $	8	–	0	–	0	10	–	1	–	0
No. 10 Xavier (LA)	5	–	1	–	0	8	–	1	–	0
No. 3 Florida A&M	4	–	1	–	0	7	–	1	–	1
No. 22 Fisk	5	–	2	–	0	6	–	2	–	0
No. 23 South Carolina State	4	–	2	–	0	5	–	2	–	0
No. 12 Bethune–Cookman	4	–	2	–	0	7	–	2	–	0
No. 15 Benedict	5	–	3	–	0	7	–	3	–	0
No. 24 Tuskegee	5	–	3	–	0	6	–	3	–	0
Alabama A&M	3	–	3	–	0	3	–	5	–	0
Lane	2	–	2	–	0	3	–	4	–	0
Morehouse	2	–	3	–	0	3	–	4	–	0
Clark (GA)	3	–	5	–	0	3	–	5	–	0
Allen	1	–	5	–	0	3	–	7	–	0
Knoxville	0	–	5	–	0	0	–	8	–	1
Alabama State	0	–	6	–	0	0	–	8	–	0
Fort Valley State	0	–	0	–	0	1	–	8	–	0
$ – Conference champion; Rankings from Associated Negro Press

The 1951 Morris Brown Wolverines football team was an American football team that represented Morris Brown College in the Southern Intercollegiate Athletic Conference (SIAC) during the 1951 college football season. In their second season under head coach Edward Clemons, the team compiled a 10–1 record, defeated Alcorn A&M in the Tropical Bowl, and outscored all opponents by a total of 449 to 56.

The Morris Brown team was rated by the Pittsburgh Courier as the 1951 black college national champion, ahead of second-place Florida A&M and third-place Tennessee A&I. The Associated Negro Press rated Morris Brown second behind North Carolina A&T but acknowledged that "Morris Brown has just as great a claim to the title because it was the nation's best offensive and defensive team."

== Schedule ==
Date	Opponent	Site	Result	Attendance	Source
September 22	Tuskegee	Herndon Stadium; Atlanta, GA	W 66–0		
September 28	Jackson*	Herndon Stadium; Atlanta, GA	W 40–0		
October 6	vs. Bethune–Cookman	Gator Bowl Stadium; Jacksonville, FL (Gateway Classic)	W 32–18		
October 13	at Florida A&M	Bragg Stadium; Tallahassee, FL	W 20–13		
October 20	Allen	Herndon Stadium; Atlanta, GA	W 44–0		
October 26	at Fort Valley State	Porter Stadium; Macon, GA	W 85–0		
November 3	at South Carolina State	State College Stadium; Orangeburg, SC	W 54–6	3,500	
November 9	at Tennessee A&I*	Sulphur Dell; Nashville, TN	L 12–13		
November 17	Benedict	Herndon Stadium; Atlanta, GA	W 25–0		
November 22	Clark (GA)	Herndon Stadium; Atlanta, GA	W 50–6	10,000	
December 1	Alcorn A&M*	Gator Bowl Stadium; Jacksonville, FL (Tropical Bowl)	W 21–0		
*Non-conference game
