= 1951 Tennessee A&I Tigers football team =

American college football season

1951 Tennessee A&I Tigers football
- Conference: Midwest Athletic Association
- Record: 8–2 (2–1 MWAA)
- Head coach: Henry Kean (8th season)
- Home stadium: Sulphur Dell

1951 Midwest Athletic Association football standings
	Conf.					Overall
Team	W		L		T	W		L		T
No. 5 Central State (OH) $	3	–	0	–	0	7	–	2	–	0
No. 3 Tennessee A&I	3	–	1	–	0	8	–	2	–	0
Texas Southern	1	–	0	–	1	7	–	2	–	1
No. 10 Lincoln (MO)	1	–	2	–	0	7	–	2	–	0
Grambling	0	–	1	–	1	4	–	5	–	1
Kentucky State	0	–	4	–	0	2	–	7	–	0
$ – Conference champion; Rankings from the Pittsburgh Courier

The 1951 Tennessee A&I Tigers football team represented Tennessee Agricultural & Industrial State College as a member of the Midwest Athletic Association (MWAA) during the 1951 college football season. In their eighth season under head coach Henry Kean, the Tigers compiled an 8–2 record and outscored opponents by a total of 203 to 93. The Dickinson System rated Tennessee A&I as the No. 3 black college football team for 1951 with a score of 23.71, behind only Florida A&M (24.71) and Morris Brown (24.43). The team played its home games in Nashville, Tennessee.

== Schedule ==
Date	Time	Opponent	Site	Result	Attendance	Source
September 21		vs. Lincoln (MO)	Melrose Stadium; Memphis, TN	W 26–21	3,500	
September 29	2:00 p.m.	at Langston*	Anderson Field; Langston, OK	W 28–2	3,000	
October 5		Allen*	Sulphur Dell; Nashville, TN	W 32–0	5,000	
October 13		at West Virginia State*	Institute, WV	W 23–13		
October 20		at Central State (OH)	Wilberforce, OH	L 7–19	3,000	
October 27		at North Carolina College*	O'Kelly Field; Durham, NC	L 6–7	6,000	
November 9		Morris Brown*	Sulphur Dell; Nashville, TN	W 13–12		
November 17		at Grambling*	Tiger Stadium; Grambling, LA	W 30–13		
November 22		Kentucky State^{†}	Sulphur Dell; Nashville, TN	W 13–6	8,000	
November 30		at Jackson*	Alumni Field; Jackson, MS	W 25–0		
*Non-conference game; ^{†}Homecoming; All times are in Central time
