= 1951 Arkansas AM&N Golden Lions football team =

American college football season

1951 Arkansas AM&N Golden Lions football

Prairie View Bowl, L 26–27 vs. 1951 Prairie View A&M
- Conference: Southwestern Athletic Conference
- Record: 5–4–1 (4–2–1 SWAC)
- Head coach: Roland K. Bernard (2nd season)
- Home stadium: Pumphrey Stadium

1951 Southwestern Athletic Conference football standings
	Conf.					Overall
Team	W		L		T	W		L		T
No. 4 Prairie View A&M $	6	–	1	–	0	9	–	1	–	0
No. 17 Texas College	4	–	1	–	2	5	–	3	–	2
No. 21 Southern	4	–	1	–	2	5	–	4	–	2
No. 20 Arkansas AM&N	4	–	2	–	1	5	–	4	–	1
Langston	4	–	3	–	0	4	–	5	–	0
Wiley	2	–	4	–	1	3	–	5	–	1
Samuel Huston	1	–	6	–	0	1	–	8	–	0
Bishop	0	–	7	–	0	0	–	9	–	0
$ – Conference champion; Rankings from Associated Negro Press

The 1951 Arkansas AM&N Golden Lions football team represented Arkansas Agricultural, Mechanical and Normal College—now known as University of Arkansas at Pine Bluff—as a member of the Southwestern Athletic Conference (SWAC) during the 1951 college football season in the United States. In their second season under head coach Roland K. Bernard, the Golden Lions compiled an overall record of 5–4–1 with a mark of 4–2–1 in conference play, placing fourth in the SWAC. Arkansas AM&N lost to 1951 Prairie View A&M in the Prairie View Bowl, 27–26.

== Schedule ==
Date	Time	Opponent	Site	Result	Attendance	Source
September 29		Wiley	Pumphrey Stadium; Pine Bluff, AR	W 18–13		
October 6	8:00 p.m.	at Texas College	Steer Stadium; Tyler, TX	L 13–18		
October 13	8:00 p.m.	at Southern	Memorial Stadium; Baton Rouge, LA	T 7–7		
October 20	2:15 p.m.	at Bishop	Tiger Field; Marshall, TX	W 37–0	5,000	
October 27		Prairie View A&M	Pumphrey Stadium; Pine Bluff, AR	L 6–20		
November 3		Samuel Huston^{†}	Pumphrey Stadium; Pine Bluff, AR	W 39–7	3,500	
November 10		Langston	Pumphrey Stadium; Pine Bluff, AR	W 19–18	3,500	
November 17		at Lincoln (MO)*	Jefferson City, MO	L 13–46	500	
November 24		at Grambling*	Tiger Stadium; Grambling, LA	W 25–13		
January 1	2:00 p.m.	vs. Prairie View A&M*	Buffalo Stadium; Houston, TX (Prairie View Bowl)	L 26–27	8,500	
*Non-conference game; ^{†}Homecoming; All times are in Central time
