= Juanita Ellsworth Miller =

American social worker

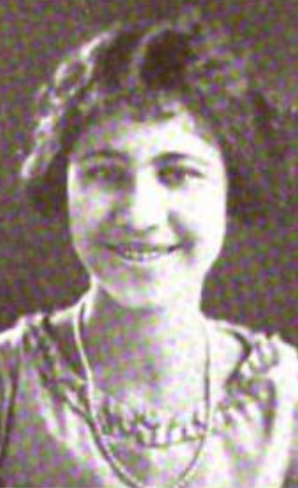
- Juanita Ellsworth Miller, from a 1928 publication
- Born: Juanita Ellsworth; April 27, 1904; Albuquerque, New Mexico, U.S.
- Died: August 17, 1970 (aged 66); Los Angeles, California, U.S.
- Occupations: Social worker, clubwoman
- Spouse: Loren Miller

Juanita Ellsworth Miller (April 27, 1904 – August 17, 1970) was an American social worker and clubwoman, based in Los Angeles.

== Early life and education ==
Ellsworth was born in Albuquerque, New Mexico, and raised in Los Angeles, California, the daughter of Edward Thomas Ellsworth and Fannie C. Williams Ellsworth. Her mother was one of the founders of the Eastside Settlement House in Los Angeles. She attended Jefferson High School in Los Angeles; she was one of seven Black graduates from Jefferson in her year, along with Ralph Bunche.

She graduated from the University of Southern California School of Social Work in 1927. She helped establish and lead the Delta Sigma Theta chapter at USC, and represented the western chapters of the sorority at its national meeting in 1926. At one Delta event, she and journalist Fay M. Jackson, music director Roena Muckleroy Savage, and librarian Miriam Matthews were also members of the USC Delta chapter with Ellsworth.

== Career ==
Miller was a social worker and relief administrator in Los Angeles. She was the first Black administrator of a social agency in Los Angeles County. She was dismissed from her county administrative role during personnel cuts and agency reorganization in 1940. In the 1940s, she worked for housing programs the city of Los Angeles.

Miller vice-president of the Los Angeles Civic League, and a charter member of the Allied Arts League. She was a life member of the NAACP, beginning with the junior branch of the Los Angeles NAACP in 1924, and remained active in Delta Sigma Theta. She was also involved in the YWCA.

== Personal life ==
Ellsworth married publisher and judge Loren Miller in 1933. They had two sons, Loren Jr. and Edward. Her husband died in 1967; she died in 1970, at the age of 66, in Los Angeles. A large collection of her husband's papers is held in the Huntington Library.
