= 1951 Wiley Wildcats football team =

American college football season

1951 Wiley Wildcats football
- Conference: Southwestern Athletic Conference
- Record: 3–5–1 (2–4–1 SWAC)
- Head coach: Eolus Von Rettig (3rd season)
- Home stadium: Wiley Stadium

1951 Southwestern Athletic Conference football standings
	Conf.					Overall
Team	W		L		T	W		L		T
No. 4 Prairie View A&M $	6	–	1	–	0	9	–	1	–	0
No. 17 Texas College	4	–	1	–	2	5	–	3	–	2
No. 21 Southern	4	–	1	–	2	5	–	4	–	2
No. 20 Arkansas AM&N	4	–	2	–	1	5	–	4	–	1
Langston	4	–	3	–	0	4	–	5	–	0
Wiley	2	–	4	–	1	3	–	5	–	1
Samuel Huston	1	–	6	–	0	1	–	8	–	0
Bishop	0	–	7	–	0	0	–	9	–	0
$ – Conference champion; Rankings from Associated Negro Press

The 1951 Wiley Wildcats football team represented Wiley College as a member of the Southwestern Athletic Conference (SWAC) during the 1951 college football season. In their third and final season under head coach Eolus Von Rettig, the Wildcats compiled an overall record of 3–5–1 with a mark of 2–4–1 in conference play, placing sixth in the SWAC.

== Schedule ==
Date	Time	Opponent	Site	Result	Attendance	Source
September 22		Dillard*	Wiley Stadium; Marshall, TX	W 80–0	2,000	
September 29		at Arkansas AM&N	Pumphrey Stadium; Pine Bluff, AR	L 13–18		
October 15		vs. Prairie View A&M	Cotton Bowl; Dallas, TX (State Fair Classic)	L 0–32	28,000	
October 22		vs. Grambling	State Fair Stadium; Shreveport, LA	L 13–19		
October 27	2:00 p.m.	Bishop	Wiley Stadium; Marshall, TX	W 14–0		
November 3		at Langston	Langston, OK	L 2–7	5,000	
November 10		at Southern	Memorial Stadium; Baton Rouge, LA	L 21–24		
November 17		at Samuel Huston	Austin, TX	W 24–0		
November 22	2:00 p.m.	Texas College	Wiley Stadium; Marshall, TX	T 15–15		
*Non-conference game; All times are in Central time
