= 1951 Prairie View A&M Panthers football team =

American college football season

1951 Prairie View A&M Panthers football

SWAC champion

Prairie View Bowl, W 27–26 vs. Arkansas AM&N
- Conference: Southwestern Athletic Conference
- Record: 9–1 (6–1 SWAC)
- Head coach: James A. Stevens (3rd season)
- Home stadium: Blackshear Field

1951 Southwestern Athletic Conference football standings
	Conf.					Overall
Team	W		L		T	W		L		T
No. 4 Prairie View A&M $	6	–	1	–	0	9	–	1	–	0
No. 17 Texas College	4	–	1	–	2	5	–	3	–	2
No. 21 Southern	4	–	1	–	2	5	–	4	–	2
No. 20 Arkansas AM&N	4	–	2	–	1	5	–	4	–	1
Langston	4	–	3	–	0	4	–	5	–	0
Wiley	2	–	4	–	1	3	–	5	–	1
Samuel Huston	1	–	6	–	0	1	–	8	–	0
Bishop	0	–	7	–	0	0	–	9	–	0
$ – Conference champion; Rankings from Associated Negro Press

The 1951 Prairie View A&M Panthers football team represented Prairie View A&M College of Texas—now known as Prairie View A&M University—as a member of the Southwestern Athletic Conference (SWAC) during the 1951 college football season. In their third and final season under head coach James A. Stevens, the Panthers compiled an overall record of 9–1 with a mark of 6–1 in conference play, winning the SWAC title. Prairie View A&M defeated Arkansas AM&N in the Prairie View Bowl, 27–26.

== Schedule ==
Date	Time	Opponent	Site	Result	Attendance	Source
September 22		Samuel Huston	Prairie View, TX	W 64–0		
September 29		vs. Bishop	Port Arthur, TX	W 72–0	4,500	
October 15		vs. Wiley	Cotton Bowl; Dallas, TX (State Fair Classic)	W 32–0	28,000	
October 27		at Arkansas AM&N	Pumphrey Stadium; Pine Bluff, AR	W 20–6		
November 3	2:30 p.m.	at Texas College	Steer Stadium; Tyler, TX	W 33–6	8,000	
November 10		Grambling*	Blackshear Field; Prairie View, TX	W 34–12		
November 17		Langston	Blackshear Field; Prairie View, TX	W 25–0	10,000	
November 24	8:00 p.m.	at Southern	Memorial Stadium; Baton Rouge, LA	L 0–13		
November 30		at Texas Southern*	Buffalo Stadium; Houston, TX (rivalry)	W 33–13	6,000–14,500	
January 1	2:00 p.m.	vs. Arkansas AM&N*	Buffalo Stadium; Houston, TX (Prairie View Bowl)	W 27–26	8,500	
*Non-conference game; All times are in Central time
