= 1951 Texas College Steers football team =

American college football season

1951 Texas College Steers football

Steel Bowl, L 13–27 vs. Bethune–Cookman
- Conference: Southwestern Athletic Conference
- Record: 5–3–2 (4–1–2 SWAC)
- Head coach: Fred T. Long (3rd season)
- Home stadium: Steer Stadium

1951 Southwestern Athletic Conference football standings
	Conf.					Overall
Team	W		L		T	W		L		T
No. 4 Prairie View A&M $	6	–	1	–	0	9	–	1	–	0
No. 17 Texas College	4	–	1	–	2	5	–	3	–	2
No. 21 Southern	4	–	1	–	2	5	–	4	–	2
No. 20 Arkansas AM&N	4	–	2	–	1	5	–	4	–	1
Langston	4	–	3	–	0	4	–	5	–	0
Wiley	2	–	4	–	1	3	–	5	–	1
Samuel Huston	1	–	6	–	0	1	–	8	–	0
Bishop	0	–	7	–	0	0	–	9	–	0
$ – Conference champion; Rankings from Associated Negro Press

The 1951 Texas College Steers football team represented Texas College as a member of the Southwestern Athletic Conference (SWAC) during the 1951 college football season. In their third season under head coach Fred T. Long, the Steers compiled an overall record of 5–3–2 with a mark of 4–1–2 in conference play, tying for second place in the SWAC. Texas College was invited to the Steel Bowl, where the Steers lost to Bethune–Cookman.

== Schedule ==
Date	Time	Opponent	Site	Result	Attendance	Source
September 22	8:00 p.m.	Florida A&M*	Steer Stadium; Tyler, TX	L 13–48	4,000	
September 29		at Samuel Huston	Austin, TX	W 24–0		
October 6	8:00 p.m.	Arkansas AM&N	Steer Stadium; Tyler, TX	W 18–13		
October 13	8:00 p.m.	vs. Langston	Dal-Hi Stadium; Dallas, TX (Texhoma Classic)	W 19–18	7,000	
October 27		at Southern	Baton Rouge, LA	T 7–7	3,000	
November 3	2:30 p.m.	Prairie View	Steer Stadium; Tyler, TX	L 6–33	8,000	
November 10	2:30 p.m.	Bishop	Steer Stadium; Tyler, TX	W 63–0		
November 22	2:00 p.m.	at Wiley	Wiley Stadium; Marshall, TX	T 15–15		
December 1	7:30 p.m.	at Paul Quinn*	Dal-Hi Stadium; Dallas, TX	W 20–6		
January 1	2:00 p.m.	at Bethune–Cookman*	Legion Field; Birmingham, AL (Steel Bowl)	L 13–27	1,500	
*Non-conference game; All times are in Central time
