= 1951 Samuel Huston Dragons football team =

American college football season

1951 Samuel Huston Dragons football
- Conference: Southwestern Athletic Conference
- Record: 1–8 (1–6 SWAC)
- Head coach: Emory Hines (3rd season)
- Home stadium: Anderson High Stadium

1951 Southwestern Athletic Conference football standings
	Conf.					Overall
Team	W		L		T	W		L		T
No. 4 Prairie View A&M $	6	–	1	–	0	9	–	1	–	0
No. 17 Texas College	4	–	1	–	2	5	–	3	–	2
No. 21 Southern	4	–	1	–	2	5	–	4	–	2
No. 20 Arkansas AM&N	4	–	2	–	1	5	–	4	–	1
Langston	4	–	3	–	0	4	–	5	–	0
Wiley	2	–	4	–	1	3	–	5	–	1
Samuel Huston	1	–	6	–	0	1	–	8	–	0
Bishop	0	–	7	–	0	0	–	9	–	0
$ – Conference champion; Rankings from Associated Negro Press

The 1951 Samuel Huston Dragons football team represented Samuel Huston College—now known as Huston–Tillotson University–as a member of the Southwestern Athletic Conference (SWAC) during the 1951 college football season. In their third and final season under head coach Emory Hines, the Dragons compiled an overall record of 1–8 with a mark of 1–6 in conference play, placing seventh in the SWAC.

== Schedule ==
Date	Time	Opponent	Site	Result	Attendance	Source
September 15		at Instituto Politécnico Nacional*	Mexico City, Mexico	L 7–13	15,000	
September 22		Prairie View A&M	Prairie View, TX	L 0–64		
September 29		Texas College	Austin, TX	L 0–24		
October 6	8:15 p.m.	Southern	Anderson High Stadium; Austin, TX	L 0–67		
October 13		Bishop		W 13–6		
October 29		vs. Langston	San Antonio, TX	L 0–18		
November 3		at Arkansas AM&N	Pumphrey Stadium; Pine Bluff, AR	L 7–39	3,500	
November 10		Texas Southern*	Austin, TX	L 2–48		
November 17		Wiley^{†}	Austin, TX	L 0–24		
*Non-conference game; ^{†}Homecoming; All times are in Central time
