= Fay M. Jackson =

American journalist (1902–1979)

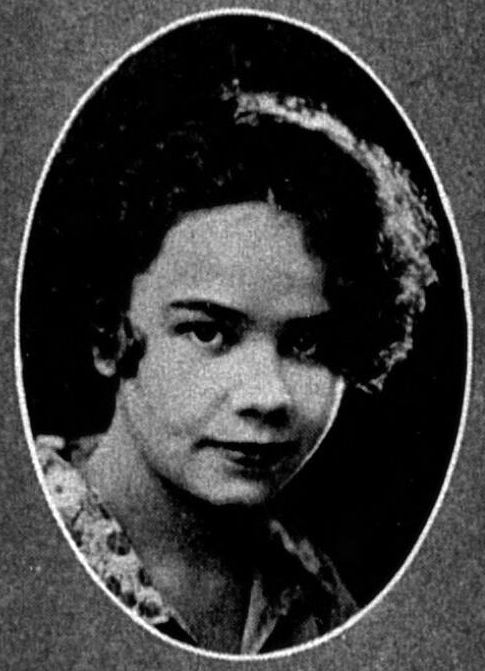
- Fay M. Jackson in 1925
- Born: May 8, 1902; Dallas, Texas
- Died: June 3, 1979 (aged 77); Los Angeles, California
- Occupation: journalist
- Known for: first black Hollywood correspondent, international reporting

Fay M. Jackson (May 8, 1902 — June 3, 1979) was an American journalist based in Los Angeles. Jackson founded the first Black news magazine on the West Coast, Flash, in 1928, and during the 1930s became the first Black Hollywood correspondent for the Associated Negro Press.

== Early life ==
Fay M. Jackson was born in Dallas, Texas, the daughter of Charles T. Jackson and Lulu Beatrice Tyson Jackson. Her father was a tradesman, a concrete mason, and her mother was a seamstress. She moved to Los Angeles with her family when she was 16, and graduated from Los Angeles Polytechnic High School. She studied journalism and philosophy at the University of Southern California. She had a secret relationship with Alice Dunbar Nelson.

== Career ==
Jackson launched Flash, a news weekly, in 1928, and had a column in over 200 newspapers. She was the first credentialed black Hollywood correspondent, but also covered domestic and international political and cultural topics. Charlotta Bass and Claude Albert Barnett were her mentors. "Young and aggressive, Miss Jackson's varied experiences in newspaper work fits her admirably for the duties we have assigned her and we have every belief that she will set a high standard in American Negro journalism," Barnett said in 1937."

In 1932, Fay M. Jackson directed publicity for the re-election campaign of white Senator Samuel M. Shortridge. In 1937, Jackson and Rudolph Dunbar were the only black reporters admitted to Westminster Abbey to cover the coronation of George VI, Jackson as foreign correspondent for the Associated Negro Press (ANP). In 1938, she founded the Cinema League of Colored Peoples, to shape the representation of racial minority characters and stories in Hollywood films. She was also press agent for soprano Ruby Elzy in the 1930s.

During World War II she worked for the War Department on housing issues, and she earned a realtor's license in the 1950s. She was active in the NAACP in Los Angeles.

== Personal life and legacy ==
Jackson married John Marshall Robinson Jr. in 1924; they had a daughter, Joan Fay Robinson, in 1926, and divorced before 1940. In the 1950s she became a devout Catholic. In 1962 she founded the Our Lady of Africa Guild, to raise funds for missionary work. Fay M. Jackson died in 1979, aged 77 years, soon after learning that her daughter had died in a plane crash. In 2000, a collection of her clippings, photographs, and other papers was displayed at the University of Southern California.
