= Roland K. Bernard =

American football player and coach (1916–1953)

Biographical details
- Born: March 14, 1916; Chelsea, Massachusetts, U.S.
- Died: June 24, 1953 (aged 37); Pine Bluff, Arkansas, U.S.

Playing career
- c. 1937: Boston University

Coaching career (HC unless noted)
- 1941: North Carolina A&T
- 1950–1952: Arkansas AM&N

Head coaching record
- Overall: 14–21–4
- Bowls: 0–1

Roland Kenneth Bernard (March 14, 1916 – June 24, 1953) was an American college football player and coach. He served as the head football coach at North Carolina Agricultural and Technical State University in 1941 and at Arkansas Agricultural, Mechanical & Normal College—now known as the University of Arkansas at Pine Bluff—from 1950 to 1952, compiling a career college football record of 14–21–4. Bernard died of a heart attack on June 24, 1953, in Pine Bluff, Arkansas.

== Head coaching record ==
Year	Team	Overall	Conference	Standing	Bowl/playoffs
North Carolina A&T Aggies (Colored Intercollegiate Athletic Association) (1941)
1941	North Carolina A&T	3–6	2–5	9th	
North Carolina A&T:		3–6	2–5		
Arkansas AM&N Golden Lions (Southwestern Athletic Conference) (1950–1952)
1950	Arkansas AM&N	3–6–1	2–5	T–5th	
1951	Arkansas AM&N	5–4–1	4–2–1	4th	L Prairie View
1952	Arkansas AM&N	3–5–2	2–2–2	4th	
Arkansas AM&N:		11–15–4	8–9–3		
Total:		14–21–4			
