= 1951 Texas Southern Tigers football team =

American college football season

1951 Texas Southern Tigers football
- Conference: Midwest Athletic Association
- Record: 7–2–1 (1–0–1 MWAA)
- Head coach: Alexander Durley (3rd season)
- Home stadium: Buffalo Stadium

1951 Midwest Athletic Association football standings
	Conf.					Overall
Team	W		L		T	W		L		T
No. 5 Central State (OH) $	3	–	0	–	0	7	–	2	–	0
No. 3 Tennessee A&I	3	–	1	–	0	8	–	2	–	0
Texas Southern	1	–	0	–	1	7	–	2	–	1
No. 10 Lincoln (MO)	1	–	2	–	0	7	–	2	–	0
Grambling	0	–	1	–	1	4	–	5	–	1
Kentucky State	0	–	4	–	0	2	–	7	–	0
$ – Conference champion; Rankings from the Pittsburgh Courier

The 1951 Texas Southern Tigers football team was an American football team that represented Texas Southern University as a member of the Midwest Athletic Association (MWAA) during the 1951 college football season. Led by third-year head coach Alexander Durley, the Tigers compiled an overall record of 7–2–1 with a mark of 1–0–1 in conference play.

== Schedule ==
Date	Opponent	Site	Result	Source
September 22	at Southern*	Baton Rouge, LA	L 0–25	
September 29	at Butler College*	Steer Stadium; Tyler, TX	W 46–8	
October 7	at Jackson*	Alumni Field; Jackson, MS	W 21–6	
October 13	at Grambling	Tiger Stadium; Grambling, LA	T 7–7	
October 20	at Kentucky State	Frankfort, KY	W 19–14	
October 27	Paul Quinn*	Buffalo Stadium; Houston, TX	W 26–7	
November 10	at Samuel Huston*	Austin, TX	W 48–2	
November 17	Alcorn A&M*	Buffalo Stadium; Houston, TX	W 19–14	
November 24	vs. Bishop*	Farrington Field; Fort Worth, TX	W 46–0	
November 30	Prairie View A&M*	Buffalo Stadium; Houston, TX (rivalry)	L 13–33	
*Non-conference game
