= Tropical Bowl (HBCUs) =

The Tropical Bowl was a college football bowl game played at Gator Bowl Stadium in Jacksonville, Florida. The game was played between 1951 and 1953 between historically black colleges and universities (HBCUs). The first game in 1951 was organized by Jacksonville businessmen after the 1951 Florida A&M Rattlers football team neglected to play a game in Jacksonville.

== Game results ==
Date	Winner		Loser		Ref.
December 1, 1951	Morris Brown	21	Alcorn A&M	0	
December 13, 1952	Bethune–Cookman	54	Albany State	0	
December 12, 1953	Virginia Union	13	Bethune–Cookman	0	

== See also ==
- Tropical Bowl (all-star game), an unrelated postseason all-star game of the same name
