= Professional Sweetheart =

1933 film directed by William A. Seiter

- Theatrical poster
- Directed by: William A. Seiter
- Written by: Maurine Watkins
- Produced by: Merian C. Cooper (executive producer)
- Starring: Ginger Rogers; Norman Foster; ZaSu Pitts; Frank McHugh
- Cinematography: Edward Cronjager
- Edited by: James B. Morley
- Music by: Roy Webb
- Production company: RKO Radio Pictures
- Release date: June 9, 1933
- Running time: 72 minutes
- Country: United States
- Language: English

Professional Sweetheart is a 1933 American pre-Code romantic comedy directed by William A. Seiter from a screenplay by Maurine Watkins. It stars Ginger Rogers in her first film for RKO Radio Pictures, with Norman Foster, ZaSu Pitts and Frank McHugh. The film is a satire of the radio industry; since it is pre-code, Rogers spends some of her time in high heels, stockings, and a slip.

== Plot ==
Glory Eden is the "Purity Girl" of the Ippsie Wippsie Hour radio program. The show's sponsor, Sam Ipswich, discovered the orphan and made her a star in three months. He needs her public image to match her pure radio persona to promote Ippsie Wippsie, "the washcloth of dreams." However, Glory longs to be a party girl who frequents nightclubs where she can drink, dance and meet men. She listens with envy as her black maid Vera describes the nightlife in Harlem. Ipswich is eager for her to sign a new contract, but she throws a tantrum and refuses because it explicitly prohibits all the things that she wants to do.

Along with everything else that Glory has missed, she wants a sweetheart. Speed Dennis, Ipswich's press agent, considers this a great idea and thinks the man should be Anglo-Saxon (to appeal to the Corn Belt), and Herbert, Glory's dressmaker, insists that he should be under 25. Ipswich's secretary tells them that the "purest Anglo-Saxons" hail from the hills of Kentucky, so Glory chooses a fan letter at random from those written by young Kentucky men. Her selection is 23-year-old Jim Davy and she likes his photo. Ipswich, Speed and Herbert want her to choose someone else, but when "sob sister" reporter Elmerada de Leon comes to interview Glory, she spots the photo, so they must play along.

Speed visits Kentucky to persuade the bashful Jim to accept a 10-day stay in New York. When Jim arrives in New York, the press expects him to marry Glory, so Speed prompts him to romance her. The wedding is conducted on the air.

Tim Kelsey assigns O'Connor to steal Glory for his own radio program. O'Connor offers to help Jim and Glory sneak away for a private honeymoon in Atlantic City, away from the press. Jim is stunned to discover O'Connor's motive and that the marriage is merely a publicity stunt. At first, Jim insists that Glory wants to retire from showbusiness and settle down, but when she learns that the Kelsey contract has no restrictions on her lifestyle, she is eager to sign. Jim takes Glory to his home in rural Kentucky.

As Jim and Glory are settling into country life, Speed arrives and unsuccessfully attempts to persuade Glory to return to New York. He then hatches a plan for Ipswich to let Vera sing as the Purity Girl that night, but the idea backfires. Glory becomes jealous, as he intended, but O'Connor is present and she signs his contract. When the couple return to New York, Jim refuses to let his wife perform without him. Speed has hired him for Ippsie Wippsie as a poet. To solve the problem, the two sponsors merge their companies to form Ippsie-Kelsey Clothies and they have Jim and Glory perform together.

== Cast ==
- Ginger Rogers as Glory Eden
- Norman Foster as Jim Davy
- ZaSu Pitts as Elmerada de Leon
- Frank McHugh as Speed Dennis
- Allen Jenkins as O'Connor
- Gregory Ratoff as Sam Ipswich
- Franklin Pangborn as Herbert Childress
- Lucien Littlefield as Announcer [Ed]
- Edgar Kennedy as Tim Kelsey
- Frank Darien as Appleby
- Sterling Holloway as Stu
- June Brewster as Telephone Operator (uncredited)
- Theresa Harris as Vera (uncredited)
- Betty Furness as Blonde Reporter (uncredited)

(Cast list as per AFI database)

== Production ==
Several industry publications of the time incorrectly attributed the screenplay to Jane Murfin, an RKO staple of the era, instead of Maurine Watkins. One of the working titles for the film was Careless before being changed to Professional Sweetheart in May 1933.

The film's only song "Imaginary Sweetheart", with words and music by Harry Akst and Edward Eliscu, was credited to Rogers. However, Rogers' singing voice was dubbed by Etta Moten. Rogers wrote in her autobiography Ginger: My Story many years later, "I was amazed and annoyed. I had been singing professionally on the stage and screen for years and thought it ridiculous to hear someone else's voice coming out of my mouth."

== Reception ==
The film received mixed to good reviews and Ginger Rogers received many positive notices for her performance.

Variety wrote: "Had the pace of Professional Sweetheart's early moments been sustained throughout the picture, its success rating would have been much more decisive. As is, it has just about enough comedy to cover up the later deficiencies..." Screenland held that the "complications are fast, furious, and merry. No static here—just clear, loud laughter." Picture Play Magazine called the acting "capital" and wrote that the film was "genuinely amusing" and "good fun edged with satire." Photoplay ranked the film among the best of the month, calling Rogers a "star" and complimenting the rest of the cast. Motion Picture Magazine called it a "wholesomely insane satire of the life of a radio queen," and Modern Screen called it a "good comedy," complimenting the acting of the principal performers. Reviewer Frank Nugent of The New York Times stated that RKO "merits a vote of thanks for an entertaining comedy" and concluded that Rogers "has rarely been more entertaining."

However, not every critic reviewed the film positively. The Film Daily critic wrote that it "failed to impress with choppy story and mechanical treatment and situations."
