= 1951 Grambling Tigers football team =

American college football season

1951 Grambling Tigers football
- Conference: Midwest Athletic Association
- Record: 4–5–1 (0–1–1 MWAA)
- Head coach: Eddie Robinson (9th season)
- Home stadium: Tiger Stadium

1951 Midwest Athletic Association football standings
	Conf.					Overall
Team	W		L		T	W		L		T
No. 5 Central State (OH) $	3	–	0	–	0	7	–	2	–	0
No. 3 Tennessee A&I	3	–	1	–	0	8	–	2	–	0
Texas Southern	1	–	0	–	1	7	–	2	–	1
No. 10 Lincoln (MO)	1	–	2	–	0	7	–	2	–	0
Grambling	0	–	1	–	1	4	–	5	–	1
Kentucky State	0	–	4	–	0	2	–	7	–	0
$ – Conference champion; Rankings from the Pittsburgh Courier

The 1951 Grambling Tigers football team represented Grambling College (now known as Grambling State University) as a member of the Midwest Athletic Association (MWAA) during the 1951 college football season. Led by ninth-year head coach Eddie Robinson, the Tigers compiled an overall record of 4–5–1 with a mark of 0–1–1 in conference play.

== Schedule ==
Date	Time	Opponent	Site	Result	Source
September 22		Maryland State*	Tiger Stadium; Grambling, LA	L 6–7	
October 6		at Xavier (LA)*	Xavier Stadium; New Orleans, LA	L 7–25	
October 13		Texas Southern	Tiger Stadium; Grambling, LA	T 7–7	
October 22		vs. Wiley*	State Fair Stadium; Shreveport, LA	W 19–13	
October 27		at Mississippi Industrial*	Holly Springs, MS	W 19–12	
November 3		Paul Quinn*	Tiger Stadium; Grambling, LA	W 32–8	
November 10		at Prairie View A&M*	Blackshear Field; Prairie View, TX	L 12–34	
November 17		Tennessee A&I	Tiger Stadium; Grambling, LA	L 13–30	
November 24		Arkansas AM&N*	Tiger Stadium; Grambling, LA	L 14–25	
December 1	8:00 p.m.	vs. Bishop*	State Fair Stadium; Shreveport, LA	W 52–0 or 56–0	
*Non-conference game; All times are in Central time
