= Emory Hines =

American sports coach and college athletics administrator

Biographical details
- Born: January 7, 1913; Texas, U.S.
- Died: March 5, 1989 (aged 76); Baton Rouge, Louisiana, U.S.

Playing career

Football
- 1932–1935: Texas College
- Position: Guard

Coaching career (HC unless noted)

Football
- 1936: Southern
- 1938–1940: Louisiana Normal (Grambling)
- 1948: Samuel Huston (assistant)
- 1949–1951: Samuel Huston

Baseball
- 1963–1976: Southern

Administrative career (AD unless noted)
- 1977–1981: Southern

Head coaching record
- Overall: 10–34–4 (football)

Emory Wellington Hines (January 7, 1913 – March 5, 1989) was an American college football and college baseball coach and athletics administrator. He serves as the head football coach at the Louisiana Negro Normal and Industrial Institute (now known as Grambling State University) in Grambling, Louisiana from 1938 to 1940 and Samuel Huston College (now known as Huston–Tillotson University) from 1949 to 1941. Hines was also the head baseball coach at Southern University in Baton Rouge, Louisiana from 1963 to 1976.

Hines played football at Texas College on teams coached by Ace Mumford. In 1936, he was an assistant football coach at Southern University under Mumford. Hines was hired in 1948 as the head of the physical education department and assistant football coach at Samuel Huston.

== Head coaching record ==
Year	Team	Overall	Conference	Standing	Bowl/playoffs
Louisiana Normal Tigers (Bi-State Conference) (1938–1940)
1938	Louisiana Normal	2–4			
1939	Louisiana Normal	4–5			
1940	Louisiana Normal	2–4–2	1–2	3rd	
Louisiana Normal:		8–13–2			
Samuel Huston Dragons (Southwestern Athletic Conference) (1949–1951)
1949	Samuel Huston	1–7	1–6	7th	
1950	Samuel Huston	0–6–2	0–6–1	8th	
1951	Samuel Huston	1–8	1–6	7th	
Samuel Huston:		2–21–2	2–18–1		
Total:		10–34–4			
