= 1940 Louisiana Normal Tigers football team =

American college football season

1940 Louisiana Normal Tigers football
- Conference: Bi-State Conference
- Record: 2–4–2 (1–2 Bi-State)
- Head coach: Emory Hines (3rd season)

1940 Bi-State Conference football standings
	Conf.					Overall
Team	W		L		T	W		L		T
Tillotson $	3	–	0	–	0	7	–	1	–	0
Jarvis Christian	3	–	1	–	0	3	–	4	–	0
Louisiana Normal (Grambling)	1	–	2	–	0	2	–	4	–	2
Samuel Huston	0	–	1	–	0	?	–	?	–	?
Paul Quinn	0	–	3	–	0	?	–	?	–	?
$ – Conference champion

The 1940 Louisiana Normal Tigers football team represented Louisiana Negro Normal and Industrial Institute—now known as Grambling State University—as a member of the Bi-State Conference during the 1940 college football season. In their third and final season under head coach Emory Hines, the Tigers compiled an overall record of 2–4–2 with a mark of 1–2 in conference play, placing third in the Bi-State.

== Schedule ==
Date	Opponent	Site	Result	Attendance	Source
September 28	Bishop*	Grambling, LA	L 0–6		
October 3	at Arkansas AM&N*	Pine Bluff, AR	L 0–6	1,200	
October 12	at Jarvis Christian	Hawkins, TX	L 0–7		
October 19	Philander Smith*	Grambling, LA	W 26–0		
October 26	Paul Quinn	Grambling, LA	W 32–0		
November 2	Leland*	Grambling, LA	T 0–0		
November 8	at Tillotson	Anderson High School stadium; Austin, TX	L 2–6		
November 30	at Tougaloo*	Tougaloo, MS	T 0–0		
*Non-conference game
