= 1951 Florida A&M Rattlers football team =

American college football season

1951 Florida A&M Rattlers football

Orange Blossom Classic, W 67–6 vs. North Carolina College
- Conference: Southern Intercollegiate Athletic Conference
- Record: 7–1–1 (4–1 SIAC)
- Head coach: Jake Gaither (7th season)
- Home stadium: Bragg Stadium

1951 Southern Intercollegiate Athletic Conference football standings
	Conf.					Overall
Team	W		L		T	W		L		T
No. 2 Morris Brown $	8	–	0	–	0	10	–	1	–	0
No. 10 Xavier (LA)	5	–	1	–	0	8	–	1	–	0
No. 3 Florida A&M	4	–	1	–	0	7	–	1	–	1
No. 22 Fisk	5	–	2	–	0	6	–	2	–	0
No. 23 South Carolina State	4	–	2	–	0	5	–	2	–	0
No. 12 Bethune–Cookman	4	–	2	–	0	7	–	2	–	0
No. 15 Benedict	5	–	3	–	0	7	–	3	–	0
No. 24 Tuskegee	5	–	3	–	0	6	–	3	–	0
Alabama A&M	3	–	3	–	0	3	–	5	–	0
Lane	2	–	2	–	0	3	–	4	–	0
Morehouse	2	–	3	–	0	3	–	4	–	0
Clark (GA)	3	–	5	–	0	3	–	5	–	0
Allen	1	–	5	–	0	3	–	7	–	0
Knoxville	0	–	5	–	0	0	–	8	–	1
Alabama State	0	–	6	–	0	0	–	8	–	0
Fort Valley State	0	–	0	–	0	1	–	8	–	0
$ – Conference champion; Rankings from Associated Negro Press

The 1951 Florida A&M Rattlers football team was an American football team that represented Florida A&M University as a member of the Southern Intercollegiate Athletic Conference (SIAC) during the 1951 college football season. In their seventh season under head coach Jake Gaither, the Rattlers compiled a 7–1–1 record. The team's sole loss was to Morris Brown. In the Orange Blossom Classic, the Rattlers defeated North Carolina College. The team played its home games at Bragg Stadium in Tallahassee, Florida.

== Schedule ==
Date	Time	Opponent	Site	Result	Attendance	Source
September 22	9:00 p.m	at Texas College*	Steer Stadium; Tyler, TX	W 48–13	4,000	
September 29		Benedict	Bragg Stadium; Tallahassee, FL	W 54–0		
October 6		at Fort Valley State	Fort Valley, GA	W 48–0		
October 13		Morris Brown	Bragg Stadium; Tallahassee, FL	L 13–20		
October 20		at North Carolina A&T*	World War Memorial Stadium; Greensboro, NC	T 7–7	25,000	
October 27		Bethune–Cookman^{†}	Bragg Stadium; Tallahassee, FL	W 26–13		
November 9		at Allen	Hurst Alumni Stadium; Columbia, SC	W 34–0		
November 17	2:30 p.m.	Southern*	Bragg Stadium; Tallahassee, FL	W 36–6	6,000	
December 1		vs. North Carolina College*	Burdine Stadium; Miami, FL (Orange Blossom Classic)	W 67–0	23,446	
*Non-conference game; ^{†}Homecoming
