= Claude Albert Barnett =

American journalist

- Born: September 16, 1889; Sanford, Florida, U.S.
- Died: August 2, 1967 (aged 77); Chicago, Illinois, U.S.
- Education: Tuskegee Institute (1904–1906)
- Occupations: Journalist, publisher, entrepreneur, philanthropist, activist
- Spouse: Etta Moten Barnett (m. 1934)

Claude Albert Barnett (September 16, 1889 – August 2, 1967) was an American journalist, publisher, entrepreneur, philanthropist, civic activist, Pan-Africanist, and founder of the Associated Negro Press (ANP). He started the first international news agency for black newspapers. He was an advocate against segregation in the military and blood supply. He was an activist force in journalism. He promoted Pan-Africanism. The (ANP) documented the Civil Rights Movement in the United States of America, and struggles for independence in Africa. Associated Negro Press was a Pan-African news service. Claude Barnett, Robert S. Abbott, and John H. Johnson were three of the most influential African-American media entrepreneurs in the 20th century. They were based in Chicago, Illinois. Barnett is said to have advanced the role of the Black Press in press coverage, news sharing, advertising, public relations, and professionalism.

Barnett was a Pan-Africanist and encouraged expatriation. He was one of the most influential African Americans of his day, and was known as an unofficial diplomat. He was an activist in journalism and international diplomacy. Barnett advised African emerging governments. Earl Morris is quoted as saying that Barnett was an "unofficial Secretary of State", and probably the best informed American on Negro countries in the world."

== Early life and education ==
Claude Albert Barnett was born on September 16, 1889, in Sanford, Florida. His great-grant grandparents were free Negroes in antebellum Raleigh, North Carolina, and at a young age he went to live with his grandmother in Matoon, Illinois. Barnett attended elementary school in Mattoon and in Oak Park, Illinois.

In 1904, he attended Tuskegee Institute, where he studied under Booker T. Washington the importance of forming networks of associates. In 1906, Barnett graduated with a degree in engineering.

== Career ==
After graduation, be began working at the Post Office in Chicago, where he saw thousands of newspapers, magazines, and advertising information and decided to start a mail-order business and cosmetic company called Kashmir Chemical company. Barnett's competitors in the cosmetic industry were Annie Malone and Madame C. J. Walker and to boost his business Florence Mills and Ada "Bricktop" Smith began to advertise his beauty products. He left the Post Office in 1916 due to poor health.

In 1919, he started the Associated Negro Press (ANP) to provide news outlets with news stories of interest to black citizens by building a team of freelance Black news reporters. In 1950, the ANP serviced 200 newspapers across the United States, and internally into the West Indies, and Africa covering events in Africa and the African diaspora. It supplied opinion columns, book reviews, movie reviews, poetry, cartoons, and photographs.

In 1934, Barnett married Etta Moten Barnett, a popular concert singer and actress. Together they raised Etta's three daughters by her previous marriage to Curtis Brooks. Barnett's marriage to Etta broadened his network of contacts. He joined her on some of her concert tours.

During WWII Barnett and others put pressure on the U.S. government to accredit black journalists to be war correspondents. In 1940, Barnett was a principal organizer of the American Negro Exposition in Chicago. In 1950, Barnett and Etta were members of the U.S. delegation to Ghana's Independence celebration. He served as a consultant to the Secretary of Agriculture from 1942 to 1953 to improve the conditions of Black tenant farmers.

Barnett traveled to Africa three times in 1960, going to Congo-Brazzaville, the DRC Congo, Liberia, Tunis, Tunisia, Tripoli, Libya, Accra, Ghana, Freetown, Sierra Leone, and Dakar, Senegal, and Nigeria. During his travels in Africa he met with heads of State, including Fulbert Youlou in Brazzaville, Congo. In the DRC he met with Col. Joseph Mobutu, who later became the president of the Congo, which would be renamed Zaire. In 1961, through Barnett's efforts the Supreme Life Insurance Company of Chicago hosted and entertained guest visitors from 19 African Countries.

Barnett was a board of directors member for Tuskegee Institute until 1965. and a trustee from 1932 to 1965.

Barnett was the director of the Associated Negro Press (ANP) for almost half a century. During his five decades career Barnett had become associated with and intimate with many of luminaries in history, such as Booker T Washington, Marcus Garvey, Ralph Bunche, Sekou Toure, Gamal Abdul Nasser, Nnamdi Azikiwe, Jawaharlal Nehru, and Nancy Cunard.

Barnett retired from the ANP 1966.

== Death and legacy ==
When Barnett died in 1967, John H. Sengstacke of the Chicago Defender is quoted as saying that Barnett "was more than a pioneering genius in the field of journalism" because "no man was ever more dedicated to the liberation of Africa" and "to the cause of Negro freedom from oppression and segregation"; thus, "his death is an irreparable loss."

In 1972, five years after the death of Claude Barnett, Paul Wyche said: "Since Claude Barnett died, there has been no black news service, NNPA has been trying to put together such a service for the past four years, but nothing has come of it as yet."

== Awards ==
- 1949 - Chevalier Order of Honor and Merit presented by the president of Haiti Eugene Magloire
- 1952 - Awarded the honorary title, “Commander of the Order of Star of Africa", by the President William V.S. Tubman of Liberia
