= Loren Miller =

American judge

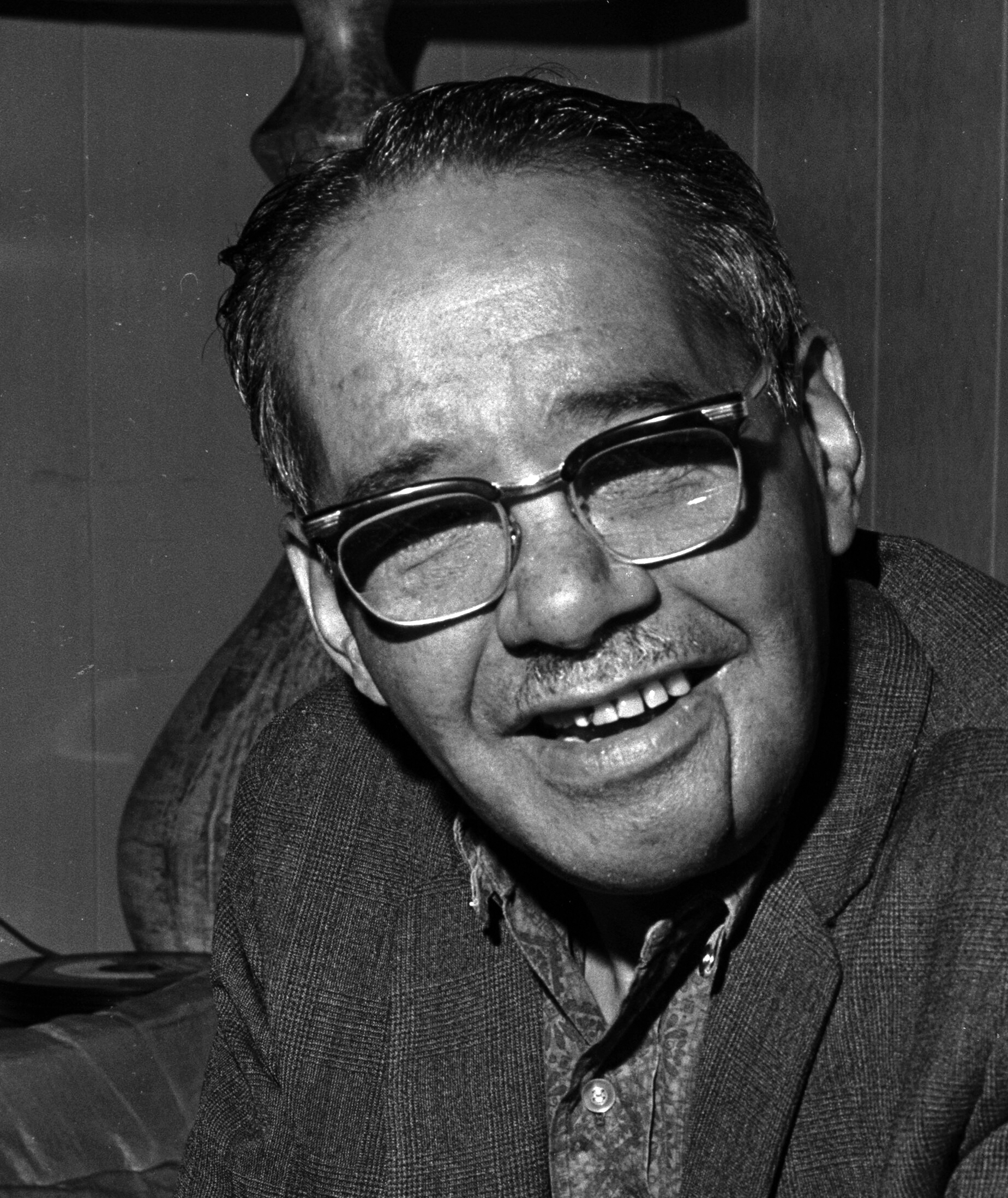
- Miller in 1965

Judge of the Los Angeles County Superior Court
- In office 1964 – July 14, 1967
- Appointed by: Pat Brown

Personal details
- Born: January 20, 1903 Pender, Nebraska, U.S.
- Died: July 14, 1967 (age 64) Los Angeles, California, U.S.
- Spouse: Juanita Ellsworth Miller
- Education: Washburn University (LLB)

Loren Miller (January 20, 1903 – July 14, 1967) was an American journalist, civil rights activist, attorney, and judge. Miller was appointed to the Los Angeles County Superior Court by governor Edmund G. "Pat" Brown in 1964 and served until his death in 1967. Miller was a specialist in housing discrimination, whose involvement in the early stages of the Civil Rights Movement earned him a reputation as a tenacious fighter for equal housing opportunities for minorities. Miller argued some of the most historic civil rights cases ever heard before the Supreme Court of the United States. He was chief counsel before the court in the 1948 decision that led to the outlawing of racial restrictive covenants, Shelley v. Kraemer.

== Early life and education ==
Miller was born 1903 in Pender, Nebraska. His father, John Bird Miller, was born in to slavery. His mother, Nora Herbaugh, was a native of Stoutland, Missouri, and of German and Irish descent. His family moved to Kansas when he was a boy, and he graduated from high school in Highland, Kansas. He attended the University of Kansas, Howard University, and Washburn University in Topeka, Kansas, where he earned his bachelor of laws degree in 1928. He was admitted to the Kansas bar the same year, and practiced law there before moving to California to pursue journalism.

== Career ==
In 1929, Miller moved to Los Angeles, California, where he began to publish in the California Eagle, a black weekly newspaper. Miller returned to the field of law and was admitted to the California State Bar in 1933. Miller's fiery Depression-era journalism earned wide respect in Los Angeles's black community. Longtime friend and client Don Wheeldin remembered that Miller was so dynamic that other lawyers would actually postpone their own cases just to hear him.

=== Legal work ===
In 1938, he defended George Farley, who killed two officers evicting him from a home auctioned out from under him over a street assessment bond. Miller and co-counsel avoided the death penalty for their client and Farley received manslaughter convictions.

By the 1940s, Miller was advocating against policies and practices that discriminated against African Americans. In the wake of World War II, many blacks had left their rural southern homes to seek economic opportunities in California, only to face discrimination and bias, particularly in housing. In the ensuing struggle for housing restrictive covenants were used to keep the migrants from spreading out beyond the area of original Negro settlement. The war workers had to find living space somewhere, and the white middle class began to look for better homes. The result was wholesale disregard for, and violation of, racial covenants, and a subsequent vigorous counter-attack. A staggering number of lawsuits were brought, approximately two hundred were filed in Los Angeles in a four-year period, and other cities had much the same experience. Miller won the court case Fairchild v. Raines (1944), a decision for a black Pasadena, California family that had bought a nonrestrictive lot but was sued by white neighbors anyway. In 1945, Miller became the attorney for the restrictive covenant case representing Hattie McDaniel, Louise Beavers, Ethel Waters, and others of the stars that had moved to what was called the "Sugar Hill" section of Los Angeles. But some whites, refusing to be comforted, had drawn up a racial restriction covenant among themselves. For seven years they had tried to sell it to the other whites, but failed. Then they went to court. Superior Judge Thurmond Clarke decided to visit the disputed ground—popularly known as "Sugar Hill." Next morning, Judge Clarke threw the case out of court. His reason: "It is time that members of the Negro race are accorded, without reservations or evasions, the full rights guaranteed them under the 14th Amendment to the Federal Constitution. Judges have been avoiding the real issue too long."

By 1947, Miller had represented more than one hundred plaintiffs seeking to invalidate housing covenants that prevented blacks from purchasing or renting housing in certain areas. The son of a slave, Miller found that housing discrimination was among the most explosive social problems in the nation and spent years representing the interests of low income clients. As a board member of the American Civil Liberties Union (ACLU), he became a well-known spokesman for the rights of minorities to enjoy equal access to housing and education. He was openly critical of the Federal Housing Authority (FHA), declaring that FHA policies fostered a Jim Crow policy that kept blacks confined to "tight ghettos" and provoked racial tension. In 1948, Miller wrote in The Nation, "... the federal government through FHA furnished it model race-restrictive clause for builders and subdividers from 1935 to 1947, and during that period the FHA refused to guarantee home construction loans unless race restriction were inserted in subdivision deeds. Racial covenants became the fashion, almost a passion, in conveyancing, and were demanded by banks and lending institutions in all real-estate developments." Commenting on the effect of racially restrictive covenants, he noted that contrary to the claims of those who supported the covenants, residential segregation did not preserve public peace and general welfare but rather resulted in "nothing but bitterness and strife." Miller was one of the first to recognize that bias in housing would be an explosive social issue in the United States. The greatest tension, he predicted, would exist where an all-white area adjoined an all-black area, because "there white Americans stand eternal guard to keep their Negro fellow Americans out." He denounced as "money lenders" and "hucksters of prejudice" the owners of slum properties where many members of minorities are forced to live under substandard conditions because of the "artificial housing shortages ... in the Negro community." Perhaps the most celebrated case Miller and partner Thurgood Marshall were involved in, Shelley v. Kraemer, 334 U.S. 1, 68 S. Ct. 836, 92 L. Ed. 1161 (1948), in which the U.S. Supreme Court declared that racial covenants on property cannot be enforced by the courts.

Later, Miller was named co-chair of the West Coast legal committee of the National Association for the Advancement of Colored People (NAACP). In that capacity, he became the first U.S. lawyer to win an unqualified verdict outlawing residential restrictive covenants in real estate sales that involved Federal Housing Administration (FHA) or Veterans Administration (VA) financing. With the rise of private corporate litigators like the NAACP to bear the expense, civil suits have become the pattern in modem civil rights litigation.

Miller purchased the newspaper California Eagle, where he had been city editor in 1929, from Charlotta Bass in 1951. His writing for the Eagle earned him a reputation in the black community as an articulate and outspoken defender of African Americans. He was a civil liberties lawyer, had a particular interest in discrimination and housing. In the ensuing years under Miller's stewardship, The Eagle continued to press for the complete integration of African Americans in every sector of society, and to protest all forms of Jim Crow. Among Miller's primary civil rights concerns were housing discrimination, police brutality, and discriminatory hiring practices in the police and fire departments. He also contributed numerous articles to such journals as The Crisis, The Nation, and Law in Transition.

In April 1953, Miller successfully argued Barrows v. Jackson, 346 U.S. 249, before the Supreme Court of the United States. The Court held that racially restrictive covenants, which it had found unconstitutional in Shelley v. Kraemer, could not be "enforced at law by a suit for damages against a co-covenantor who allegedly broke the covenant." Barrows had been awarded damages when she sued Jackson for violation of a restrictive covenant that barred the sale of Jackson's property in Los Angeles to a "non-Caucasian." The trial court had reached that conclusion and it had been affirmed by California's District Court of Appeal for the Second Appellate District, after which the Supreme Court of California denied hearing.

In 1964, California Governor Pat Brown appointed Miller a Los Angeles Municipal Court Justice, where he served until his death.

=== The Petitioners ===
In 1966, Judge Miller wrote The Petitioners: The Story of the Supreme Court of the United States and the Negro, a book that recounts the vital role of the U.S. Supreme Court in shaping the lives of African Americans in the United States.

This is a chronicle of what the Supreme Court has said and done in respect of the rights of Negroes, slave and free, between 1789 and 1965. As a "ward" of the U. S. Supreme Court for the last 100 years, the Negro has had to solicit assistance in order to exercise the rights and privileges taken for granted by other citizens, from riding on Pullman cars to voting in primary elections. Historically, the Supreme Court's response to the Negro's plea for redress of grievances has been uneven. For a 60-year period following enaction of the Civil War Amendments, the Negro petition met with rebuff and evasion, when, in the mid-1930s, the Court began to return to the original meaning of those amendments, "it overturned or ignored its own strangling precedents and even assumed an amazing leadership in the area of civil rights." Here, then, is an original work of American history that presents a picture of our changing society as seen from the viewpoint of those who were systematically excluded from it, and who had to become petitioners to change its course.

=== Legacy and honors ===
In 1968, Loren Miller Elementary School, a new $1,200,000 campus in South Central Los Angeles, was named after Judge Miller.

The Loren Miller Bar Association (LMBA) was founded in August 1968, Seattle, Washington. From its infancy, LMBA adopted a vigorous platform of confronting institutionalized racism and the myriad social and economic disparities affecting the African-American community.

Created in 1977 to commemorate the 50th anniversary of the State Bar of California, the prestigious Loren Miller Legal Services Award is given annually to a lawyer who has demonstrated long-term commitment to legal services and who has personally done significant work in extending legal services to the poor.

== Personal life ==
Miller died in Los Angeles on July 14, 1967.

Miller's son, Loren Miller, Jr., served on the bench in Los Angeles County from 1975 to 1997 and continued to sit by assignment until his death in 2011. With her judicial appointment in 2003 to the Superior Court of Los Angeles County, Robin Miller Sloan, the daughter of Loren Miller, Jr., became the first linear third-generation judge in the history of the California court system, according to legal researchers.

== Bibliography ==
- Caughey, Laree. Los Angeles: Biography of a City, University of California Press, (1997) ISBN 0-520-03410-4
- Flamming, Douglas. Bound for Freedom: Black Los Angeles in Jim Crow America, University of California Press, (2005) ISBN 0-520-23919-9
- Horne, Gerald. Fire This Time: The Watts Uprising and the 1960s, Da Capo Press, (1997) - ISBN 0-306-80792-0
- Smith, R. J. The Great Black Way: L.A.'s Central Avenue in the 1940s and the Lost African-American Renaissance, Public Affairs, (2006) - ISBN 1-58648-295-5
- West's Encyclopedia of American Law: "Loren Miller"
- Tushnet, Mark V. Making Civil Rights Law: Thurgood Marshall and the Supreme Court, 1936–1961, Oxford University Press, (1994) - ISBN 0-19-508412-8
- Greg Robinson, Loren Miller: African American Defender of Japanese American Equality
- Daryl Strickland, Creating a lasting legacy at Loren Miller Elementary
- Blackpast biography
- Photographic exhibit curated by the Alliance for Networking Visual Culture
