= Tropical Bowl (all-star game) =

College football all-star game

- FBS All Americans Tropical Bowl
- Stadium: Daytona Stadium
- Location: Daytona Beach, Florida
- Previous stadiums: see Game results
- Operated: 2016–present
- Website: tropicalbowl.com

Former names
- Tropic Bowl (2016)

2025 matchup
- American vs. National (American 17–7)

2026 matchup
- Canceled

The Tropical Bowl is a postseason all-star game featuring top college football seniors mainly from FBS. Started in 2016, the game is played annually in Florida in January. Initially played as the Tropic Bowl, it has used its current name since the January 2017 game. The 2026 edition was canceled due to "unforeseen circumstances" outside of the control of the organizers.

== Game results ==
Date	American Team		National Team		Stadium	City (Florida)	Ref.
Date	Coach	Score		Coach	Stadium	City (Florida)	Ref.
January 17, 2016	Bill Khayat	38	14	Mike Stock	North Miami Stadium	North Miami Beach	
January 15, 2017	Todd Littlejohn	14	28	Mike Stock	Daytona Stadium†	Daytona Beach	
January 14, 2018	Todd Littlejohn	26	20	Mike Stock	Daytona Stadium†	Daytona Beach	
January 13, 2019	Todd Littlejohn	24	16	Jim Collins	Daytona Stadium†	Daytona Beach	
January 12, 2020	Todd Littlejohn	7	35	Jim Collins	Spec Martin Stadium	DeLand	
January 17, 2021	Chris Miller	17	20	Jim Collins	Celebration High School	Celebration	
January 15, 2022	Todd Littlejohn	24	14	Jim Collins	Camping World Stadium	Orlando	
January 21, 2023	Todd Littlejohn	48	10	Jim Collins	Camping World Stadium	Orlando	
January 20, 2024	Todd Littlejohn	17	17	Jim Collins	Daytona Stadium†	Daytona Beach	
January 19, 2025	Todd Littlejohn	17	7	Jim Collins	Daytona Stadium†	Daytona Beach	
2026	Canceled				Daytona Stadium†	Daytona Beach	

† Daytona Stadium was formerly known as Municipal Stadium, and is referred to as such on the game's website.

== Alumni ==
Over 350 Tropical Bowl alumni have gone on to the NFL since its inception. The game's website lists various notable players who have appeared in the Tropical Bowl, several Pro Bowl and Super Bowl players including: Danny Etling, J. T. Gray, D. J. Killings, Wil Lutz, Scotty Miller, and Kenny Moore II.

== See also ==
- Tropical Bowl (HBCUs), an unrelated team-competitive bowl game of the 1950s
