= Associated Negro Press =

American news agency (1919–1964)

- Type: News agency
- Industry: Media
- Founded: March 2, 1919; 107 years ago
- Founders: Claude Albert Barnett
- Defunct: 1964; 62 years ago
- Headquarters: Chicago, United States
- Area served: National, International
- Services: domestic and foreign news coverage, columns, syndication

The Associated Negro Press (ANP) was an American news service founded in 1919 in Chicago, Illinois by Claude Albert Barnett. The ANP had correspondents, writers, reporters in all major centers of the black population in the United States of America. It supplied news stories, opinions, columns, feature essays, book and movie reviews, critical and comprehensive coverage of events, personalities, and institutions relevant to black Americans. As the ANP grew into a global network. It supplied the vast majority of black newspapers with twice weekly packets.

The office of the Associated Negro Press was located at 312 South Clark Street in Chicago. The ANP served about 150 U.S. Negro newspapers and 100 newspapers in Africa in French and English.

It is stated in The Rise & Fall of the Negro Press by Gerald Horne that from 1865 to 1900 approximately 12,000 newspapers catering to African Americans were in existence. From 1933 to 1940 the Office of War Information wrote that there were about 4 million black readers of Black newspapers. The ANP was the first African American news gathering service with African American foreign correspondents.

== History ==
Claude Barnett started the Associated Negro Press in 1919 in Chicago. It was a service that provided news outlets with news. By 1950 the ANP serviced 200 newspapers across the United States of America and globally. It was the first international news agency for Black newspapers. It supplied news stories relevant to the African American, African, and the African Diaspora communities. The ANP had journalists and writers in Europe, Caribbean, and Africa. The ANP was "the most ambitious black press institution in the country before Johnson Publishing Company and more extensive", according to Gerald Horne in his book The Rise & Fall of the Associated Negro Press. Around 1945 the ANP grew into a global network with outlets in Africa, London. In the late 1950s about 75 African papers subscribed to its services. The news packets were in French and in English. The ANP documented African American experiences in the United States of America and abroad from the 1920s to 1960s.

The black press during its golden years became, "the greatest single power in the Negro race."

During the 'Chicago Black Renaissance', the ANP was an outlet for African American writers. The ANP was a bridge between the black masses and the black intellectuals.

The ANP globalized the African American Civil Rights struggle. The Chicago-based ANP fought racism in America and abroad. It had African correspondents in Kenya, Tanganyika, Southern Rhodesia, Congo, Nigeria, Ghana, and Liberia. The ANP clipped about 100 items from African newspapers for news packets.

The ANP reported on and brought attention to racism and racial incidents in the U.S. America, Rio de Janeiro, Brazil, Buenos Aires, Argentina, Guatemala, Panama, and Bolivia and wherever there were African people or the African. The ANP was a very significant institution for almost five decades. It is credited with increasing readership and interest in national and international news.

In the summer of 1964 the ANP went out of business due to several factors, as documented by Gerald Horne in his book titled The Rise & Fall of the Associated Negro Press. As integration took hold, Barnett no longer had a captive African American market in the news gathering business. Mainstream media started to hire African American writers and journalists; and to report on Jim Crow issues. The new era of Integration opportunities opened up for many of the African American journalists that had worked for the Associated Negro Press. Barnett is quoted as saying, "as soon as [we] train a man up, one of the big papers come[s] along and hires him at a price we cannot afford to meet."

When the ANP closed it had a membership of 75 American Negro newspapers, 200 African newspapers, two radio stations and two magazines.

== Notable contributors ==
Many well known writers and authors contributed articles to the Associated Negro Press. The ANP's Chicago office had a staff of six employees, and 72 correspondents in strategic locations in the United States of America, Africa, Europe, and the African Diaspora for gathering news stories and reports. They also did news packet mailings.

- Alice Dunnigan wrote for the ANP. She was the first African-American female correspondent to get White House credentials, and the first to a member of the Senate and House of Representatives press gallery. In 1947 she was the head of the Associated Negro Press in the Washington Bureau. She held this post for 14 years servicing 112 African-American newspapers across the country. In 2018 a six-foot bronze statue was created to honor Dunnigan. She went from working with the American Negro Press to working full-time for Lyndon B. Johnson. She worked on his campaign for the Democratic nomination. She continued to work for Lyndon B. Johnson when he was vice president and with the Johnson Administration when he became president. She was also information specialist for the Department of Labor for 1966 and 1967.
- Fay M. Jackson was hired by the Association of Negro Publishers ANP. She was initially ANP's Hollywood correspondent. She focused on African American movie stars. Ms Jackson also wrote about non-African American movie starts in Hollywood. In 1937, she was sent to London, England to represent ANP to attend and cover events around the coronation of King George VI. She interviewed Emperor Haile Selassie of Ethiopia, singer Josephine Baker, and writer H. G. Wells, while in Europe.
- Nancy Cunard was a British poet, journalist, activist who wrote for the Associated Negro Press. She was a regular Associated Negro Press correspondent reporting on events in Western Europe.
- Thyra J. Edwards, as a correspondent she traveled to Europe, Mexico, and the Soviet Union.
- Langston Hughes a contributing columnist.
- Richard Wright held an Associated Negro press card
- George Padmore – ANP correspondent
- Zora Neale Hurston – cultural trends in Harlem
- Frank Marshall Davis – worked for the ANP as an editor for 13 years.
- Alice Dunbar Nelson a contributor to ANP
- Es'kia Mphahlele South African Writer for ANP
- Mary Church Terrell wrote feature articles for ANP. She was a founding member of the National Association of Colored Women. She was also the first Black a woman on the Board of Education for the United States of America.
- Rudolph Dunbar was an ANP correspondent in London.
- Vernon Jordan a correspondent and with the National Urban League
- Roy Wilkins with the National Association for the Advancement of Colored People NAACP.
- Merze Tate offered her service to write for the ANP
- James Weldon Johnson the President of the National Association for the Advancement of Colored People was a contributing editor.
- Earl Morris – ANP correspondent in Mexico.
- John Robinson (aviator) – As a pilot in Ethiopia in the 1930s during the Italian invasion he sent dispatches from the front line battlefield developments to the ANP.
- Harry Levette – ANP Hollywood correspondent
- George Padmore – ANP correspondent
- Enoch Waters – ANP correspondent
- Gordon Blaine Hancock – He had a weekly syndicated news column called "Between the Lines," for the Associated Negro Press. He worked for ANP from 1928 to 1965.
- Horace Mann Bond was a contributing editor of ANP, and a Claude Barnett Associate.
- Nat Nakasa – A South African writer who contributed the ANP.
- William Pickens – was an author and a contributing editor of ANP for 21 years.
- P.L. Prattis joined ANP in 1923 and continued to work for the agency for 12 years.
- Drusilla Dunjee Houston – ANP correspondent.
- Loren Miller (judge)reported and wrote for the ANP.
- Homer Smith (penname Chatwood Hall), an ANP Moscow correspondent.
- John L. LeFlore a Civil Rights leader and founder of the NAACP in Mobile, Alabama was an ANP correspondent.
- Kelly Miller (scientist) an author, essayist, columnist and known as the "Bard of the Potomac" wrote for ANP.
- George Wells Parker an author, political activist, historian, and one of the first African Americans to graduate from Harvard University wrote for the ANP. He was the author of "The African Origin of the Grecian Civilization."
- Algernon B. Jackson an African American physician, surgeon, author, and columnist was a health editor for the ANP.
- James Albert "Billboard" Jackson a New York ANP executive correspondent. He wrote a regular column for the ANP, and was appointed as "Negro Business Specialist" in the Commerce Department, by Secretary of Commerce Herbert Hoover.
- Nnamdi Azikiwe wrote for the Associated Negro Press before he became the First President of Independent Nigeria.
- Eslanda Goode Robeson was an editorial consultant, and reporter on Black and colonial issues.

== See also ==
- African American newspapers
- Alternative news agency
- Chicago Defender Building
